= Rissiam =

Village in Kongoussi Department, Burkina Faso

Rissiam Rissiam-Tang Zougou
- Location in Burkina Faso
- Coordinates: 13°18′N 1°35′W
- Country: Burkina Faso
- Region: Centre-Nord Region
- Province: Bam Province
- Department: Kongoussi Department

Population (2019)
  - Total: 948
- Time zone: UTC+0 (GMT 0)

Rissiam is a village in the Kongoussi Department of Bam Province in northern Burkina Faso.

It is located approximately 20 km southwest of Lake Bam.

A distinguishing feature is a series of soil erosion control measures built from 1989 onwards, that have stabilised gullies in a seasonal river channel, and farmers' fields.

Population
Year	Pop.	±%
1985	1,494	—
2006	1,046	−30.0%
2019	948	−9.4%
