= Ziniaré Department =

Coordinates: 12°34′56″N 1°17′54″W

Ziniaré
- Department
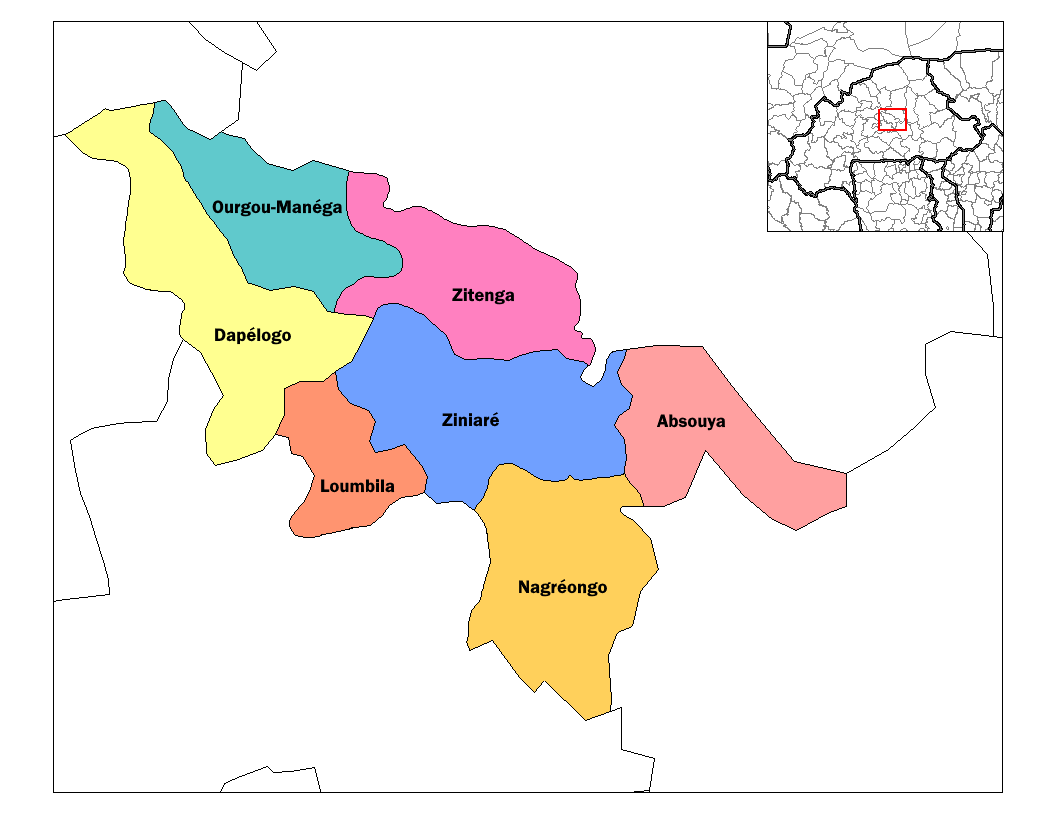
- Ziniaré Department's location in the province
- Country: Burkina Faso
- Province: Oubritenga Province

Area
  - Department: 203 sq mi (526 km^{2})

Population (2019)
  - Department: 88,299
  - Density: 435/sq mi (168/km^{2})
  - Urban: 33,296
- Time zone: UTC+0 (GMT 0)

Ziniaré is a department or commune of Oubritenga Province in northern-central Burkina Faso. Its capital is the town of Ziniaré. According to the 2019 census the department has a total population of 88,299.

== Towns and villages ==
- Ziniaré (33,301 inhabitants) (capital)
- Badnogo (515)
- Bagadogo (1,022)
- Basbedo (939)
- Barkuitenga (1,529)
- Barkoudouba (859)
- Betta (1,265)
- Bissiga Peulh (144)
- Boalin (580)
- Boulba (748)
- Gam-Silimimossé (800)
- Gombogo (642)
- Gombogo-Peulh (188)
- Gonsé (210)
- Gondogo Tandaaga (853)
- Gombogo (1,645)
- Ipala (1,417)
- Kartenga (811)
- Koada-Yarcé (483)
- Koassanga (2,551)
- Kolgondiessé (477)
- Koulgandogo (239)
- Koulgando-peulh (195)
- Ladwenda (873)
- Laongo-yanga (972)
- Matté (906)
- Moutti (1,200)
- Moyargo (618)
- Nabitenga (636)
- Nakamtenga I (749)
- Nakamtenga II (700)
- Namassa (1,105)
- Napamboubou-saalin (415)
- Ouagatenga (515)
- Oubri-Yaoghin (1,465)
- Pilaga peulh (479)
- Rassempoughin (201)
- Sawana (2,095)
- Songpélcé (2,357)
- Tanghin-Gombogo (917)
- Tanghin Goudry (528)
- Tamassa (307)
- Tamissi (959)
- Tambogo Peulh (226)
- Tampougtenga (1,007)
- Tanpoko Peulh (295)
- Taonsgo (1,609)
- Tibin (619)
- Ziga (2,392)
