= Sika =

Sika may refer to:

- Sika (people), an ethnic group in Indonesia
- Sika, Burkina Faso, a village
- Sika, Iran, a village
- Sika, Võru County, a village
- Sika, Rõuge Parish, a village
- Sika language, the language of the Sika people
- Sika deer, a species of deer native to East Asia
- Sika AG, a chemical company based in Switzerland
- Sika Club Beirut, a former association football club in Lebanon
- The proper name of the star HD 181720

== People with the given name ==
- Sika Anoaʻi (born 1945), American Samoan professional wrestler
- Sika Koné (born 2002), Malian women's basketball player
- Sika Manu (born 1987), New Zealand rugby league player

== People with the surname ==
- Jutta Sika (1877–1964), Austrian graphic designer and artist
- Paul Sika (born 1985), Ivorian fashion and advertising photographer, creative director and artist
- Salesi Sika (born 1980), Tongan-American rugby union player
- Seïdou Mama Sika (born 1949), Beninese politician
- Semisi Sika, Tongan politician

== See also ==
- Sikka (disambiguation)
