= Pogoro =

Pogoro may refer to:

- Pogoro, Bam, a village in Bam Province, northern Burkina Faso
- Pogoro-Foulbé, a village in Bam Province, northern Burkina Faso
- Pogoro, Yatenga, a village in Yatenga Province, Burkina Faso
- Pogoro language, a Niger–Congo language of Tanzania, East Africa
- Pogoro people, a people of Tanzania, East Africa
- Pogoro (millipede), a genus of African millipedes in the family Gomphodesmidae
