= Ibi, Burkina Faso =

Village in Rollo Department, Burkina Faso

- Location in Burkina Faso
- Coordinates: 13°29′N 1°46′W
- Country: Burkina Faso
- Region: Centre-Nord Region
- Province: Bam Province
- Department: Rollo Department

Population (2019)
  - Total: 2,381
- Time zone: UTC+0 (GMT 0)

Ibi, Burkina Faso is a village in Rollo Department of Bam Province in northern Burkina Faso, West Africa. As of 2005, the village has a population of 1,374, mostly Mossi peoples. It is accessed by a track from Rollo and is very remote, even by the standards of northern Burkina Faso. There are no vehicles in the village other than mopeds, carts and bicycles and traditional agriculture is the main occupation.

The community is split into two hamlets, old and new Ibi, separated by about 1 km. The village was known for community efforts to build soil and water conservation initiatives in the 1990s, supported by the German PATECORE project, and hosted development workers and researchers.

Population
Year	Pop.	±%
1985	874	—
2006	1,398	+60.0%
2019	2,381	+70.3%
