= Tanga-Pela =

Village in Sabce Department, Burkina Faso

- Country: Burkina Faso
- Region: Centre-Nord Region
- Province: Bam Province
- Department: Sabce Department

Population (2019)
  - Total: 550
- Time zone: +2

Tanga-Pela is a village in the Sabce Department of Bam Province in northern-central Burkina Faso.

Population
Year	Pop.	±%
1985	215	—
2006	540	+151.2%
2019	550	+1.9%
