= Pittenga =

Village in Rouko Department, Burkina Faso

- Interactive map of Pittenga
- Coordinates: 13°12′10″N 1°40′19″W
- Country: Burkina Faso
- Region: Centre-Nord Region
- Province: Bam Province
- Department: Rouko Department

Population (2019)
  - Total: 1,908
- Time zone: +2

Pittenga is a town in the Rouko Department of Bam Province in northern-central Burkina Faso.

Population
Year	Pop.	±%
1985	1,523	—
2006	2,155	+41.5%
2019	1,908	−11.5%
