= Kougsabla =

Village in Sabce Department, Burkina Faso

Coordinates: 13°16′N 1°34′W

Kougsabla Kougoussable
- Interactive map of Kougsabla
- Country: Burkina Faso
- Region: Centre-Nord Region
- Province: Bam Province
- Department: Sabce Department

Population (2019)
  - Total: 2,031
- Time zone: +2

Kougsabla is a town in the Sabce Department of Bam Province in northern-central Burkina Faso.

Population
Year	Pop.	±%
1985	854	—
2006	1,197	+40.2%
2019	2,031	+69.7%
