= Tanguiema =

Village in Kongoussi Department, Burkina Faso

- Location in Burkina Faso
- Coordinates: 13°17′N 1°32′W
- Country: Burkina Faso
- Region: Centre-Nord Region
- Province: Bam Province
- Department: Kongoussi Department

Population (2019)
  - Total: 689
- Time zone: UTC+0 (GMT 0)

Tanguiema is a village in the Kongoussi Department of Bam Province in northern Burkina Faso.

Population
Year	Pop.	±%
1985	155	—
2006	997	+543.2%
2019	689	−30.9%
