= Tontenga =

Village in Guibare Department, Burkina Faso

- Location in Burkina Faso
- Coordinates: 13°6′N 1°40′W
- Country: Burkina Faso
- Region: Centre-Nord Region
- Province: Bam Province
- Department: Guibare Department

Population (2019)
  - Total: 1,690
- Time zone: UTC+0 (GMT 0)

Tontenga is a village in the Guibare Department of Bam Province in northern Burkina Faso.

Population
Year	Pop.	±%
1985	494	—
2006	945	+91.3%
2019	1,690	+78.8%
