= Sargo, Burkina Faso =

Village in Kongoussi Department, Burkina Faso

Sargo
- Location in Burkina Faso
- Coordinates: 13°20′N 1°34′W
- Country: Burkina Faso
- Region: Centre-Nord Region
- Province: Bam Province
- Department: Kongoussi Department

Population (2019)
  - Total: 2,516
- Time zone: UTC+0 (GMT 0)

Sargo is a town in the Kongoussi Department of Bam Province in northern Burkina Faso.

Population
Year	Pop.	±%
1985	1,225	—
2006	1,532	+25.1%
2019	2,516	+64.2%
