= Tamiga-Fulbé =

Village in Nassere Department, Burkina Faso

- Country: Burkina Faso
- Region: Centre-Nord Region
- Province: Bam Province
- Department: Nassere Department

Population (2019)
  - Total: 101
- Time zone: UTC+0 (GMT 0)

Tamiga-Fulbé is a village in the Nassere Department of Bam Province in northern Burkina Faso.

Population
Year	Pop.	±%
2006	85	—
2019 (estimate)	101	+18.8%
