= Fénéguéné =

Village in Nassere Department, Burkina Faso

- Country: Burkina Faso
- Region: Centre-Nord Region
- Province: Bam Province
- Department: Nassere Department

Population (2019)
  - Total: 389
- Time zone: UTC+0 (GMT 0)

Fénéguéné is a village in the Nassere Department of Bam Province in northern Burkina Faso.

Population
Year	Pop.	±%
1985	207	—
2006	328	+58.5%
2019 (estimate)	389	+18.6%
