= Mafoulou =

Village in Sabce Department, Burkina Faso

- Location in Burkina Faso
- Coordinates: 13°13′N 1°22′W
- Country: Burkina Faso
- Region: Centre-Nord Region
- Province: Bam Province
- Department: Sabce Department

Population (2019)
  - Total: 710
- Time zone: +2

Mafoulou is a village in the Sabce Department of Bam Province in northern-central Burkina Faso.

Deposits of antimony have been reported.

Population
Year	Pop.	±%
1985	461	—
2006	578	+25.4%
2019	710	+22.8%
