= Nongsom-Foulbé =

Village in Kongoussi Department, Burkina Faso

- Interactive map of Nongsom-Foulbé
- Coordinates: 13.4417°N 1.6733°W
- Country: Burkina Faso
- Region: Centre-Nord Region
- Province: Bam Province
- Department: Kongoussi Department

Population (2019)
  - Total: 302
- Time zone: UTC+0 (GMT 0)

Nongsom-Foulbé is a village in the Kongoussi Department of Bam Province in northern Burkina Faso.

Population
Year	Pop.	±%
2005	187	—
2019	302	+61.5%
