= Yalka =

Village in Kongoussi Department, Burkina Faso

- Location in Burkina Faso
- Coordinates: 13°30′N 1°33′W
- Country: Burkina Faso
- Region: Centre-Nord Region
- Province: Bam Province
- Department: Kongoussi Department

Population (2019)
  - Total: 2,240
- Time zone: UTC+0 (GMT 0)

Yalka is a village in the Kongoussi Department of Bam Province in northern Burkina Faso. As of 2019, it has a population of 2,240.

Population
Year	Pop.	±%
1985	1,389	—
2005	748	−46.1%
2019	2,240	+199.5%
