= Ouittenga =

Village in Rollo Department, Burkina Faso

- Country: Burkina Faso
- Region: Centre-Nord Region
- Province: Bam Province
- Department: Rollo Department

Population (2019)
  - Total: 824
- Time zone: UTC+0 (GMT 0)

Ouittenga is a village in the Rollo Department of Bam Province in northern Burkina Faso. It has a population of 543.

Population
Year	Pop.	±%
1985	289	—
2005	543	+87.9%
2019	824	+51.7%
