= Zandkom-Peulh =

Village in Sabce Department, Burkina Faso

- Location in Burkina Faso
- Coordinates: 13.1253°N 1.5333°W
- Country: Burkina Faso
- Region: Centre-Nord Region
- Province: Bam Province
- Department: Sabce Department

Population (2019)
  - Total: 431
- Time zone: +2

Zandkom-Peulh is a village in the Sabce Department of Bam Province in northern-central Burkina Faso.

Population
Year	Pop.	±%
1985	323	—
2006	379	+17.3%
2019	431	+13.7%
