= Gondékoubé =

Village in Rollo Department, Burkina Faso

Gondékoubé Gandekoube
- Location in Burkina Faso
- Coordinates: 13°41′N 1°43′W
- Country: Burkina Faso
- Region: Centre-Nord Region
- Province: Bam Province
- Department: Rollo Department

Population (2019)
  - Total: 4,191
- Time zone: UTC+0 (GMT 0)

Gondékoubé is a town in the Rollo Department of Bam Province in northern Burkina Faso.

Population
Year	Pop.	±%
1985	1,915	—
2006	3,721	+94.3%
2019	4,191	+12.6%
