= Koulwéogo =

Village in Rollo Department, Burkina Faso

Koulwéogo Koulouego
- Location in Burkina Faso
- Coordinates: 13°38′N 1°47′W
- Country: Burkina Faso
- Region: Centre-Nord Region
- Province: Bam Province
- Department: Rollo Department

Population (2019)
  - Total: 1,584
- Time zone: UTC+0 (GMT 0)

Koulwéogo is a village in the Rollo Department of Bam Province in northern Burkina Faso.

Population
Year	Pop.	±%
1985	591	—
2006	873	+47.7%
2019	1,584	+81.4%
