= Kora-Foulbé =

Village in Kongoussi Department, Burkina Faso

- Country: Burkina Faso
- Region: Centre-Nord Region
- Province: Bam Province
- Department: Kongoussi Department

Population (2019)
  - Total: 236
- Time zone: UTC+0 (GMT 0)

Kora-Foulbé is a village in the Kongoussi Department of Bam Province in northern Burkina Faso.

Population
| Year | Pop. | ±% |
|---|---|---|
| 2006 | 579 | — |
| 2019 | 236 | −59.2% |
