= Gougré =

Village in Guibare Department, Burkina Faso

- Location in Burkina Faso
- Coordinates: 13°5′N 1°34′W
- Country: Burkina Faso
- Region: Centre-Nord Region
- Province: Bam Province
- Department: Guibare Department

Population (2019)
  - Total: 483
- Time zone: UTC+0 (GMT 0)

Gougré is a village in the Guibare Department of Bam Province in northern Burkina Faso.

Population
Year	Pop.	±%
1985	180	—
2006	361	+100.6%
2019	483	+33.8%
