= Darigma =

Village in Kongoussi Department, Burkina Faso

Darigma Dariguima
- Location in Burkina Faso
- Coordinates: 13°24′N 1°32′W
- Country: Burkina Faso
- Region: Centre-Nord Region
- Province: Bam Province
- Department: Kongoussi Department

Population (2019)
  - Total: 1,429
- Time zone: UTC+0 (GMT 0)

Darigma is a village in the Kongoussi Department of Bam Province in northern Burkina Faso.

Population
| Year | Pop. | ±% |
|---|---|---|
| 1985 | 475 | — |
| 2006 | 760 | +60.0% |
| 2019 | 1,429 | +88.0% |
