= Tangaye =

Tangaye may refer to several places in Burkina Faso:

- Tangaye, Bam
- Tangaye, Gnagna of Gnagna
- Tangaye Department
