= Sillaléba =

Village in Nassere Department, Burkina Faso

Sillaléba Silaleba
- Interactive map of Sillaléba
- Country: Burkina Faso
- Region: Centre-Nord Region
- Province: Bam Province
- Department: Nassere Department

Population (2019)
  - Total: 924
- Time zone: UTC+0 (GMT 0)

Sillaléba is a village in the Nassere Department of Bam Province in northern Burkina Faso.

Population
Year	Pop.	±%
1985	670	—
2006	780	+16.4%
2019 (estimate)	924	+18.5%
