= Lourfa =

Village in Rollo Department, Burkina Faso

Coordinates: 13°32′N 1°37′W

- Interactive map of Lourfa
- Country: Burkina Faso
- Region: Centre-Nord Region
- Province: Bam Province
- Department: Rollo Department

Population (2019)
  - Total: 2,236
- Time zone: UTC+0 (GMT 0)

Lourfa is a town in the Rollo Department of Bam Province in northern Burkina Faso.

Population
| Year | Pop. | ±% |
|---|---|---|
| 1985 | 601 | — |
| 2006 | 1,264 | +110.3% |
| 2019 | 2,236 | +76.9% |
