= Vousnango =

Village in Guibare Department, Burkina Faso

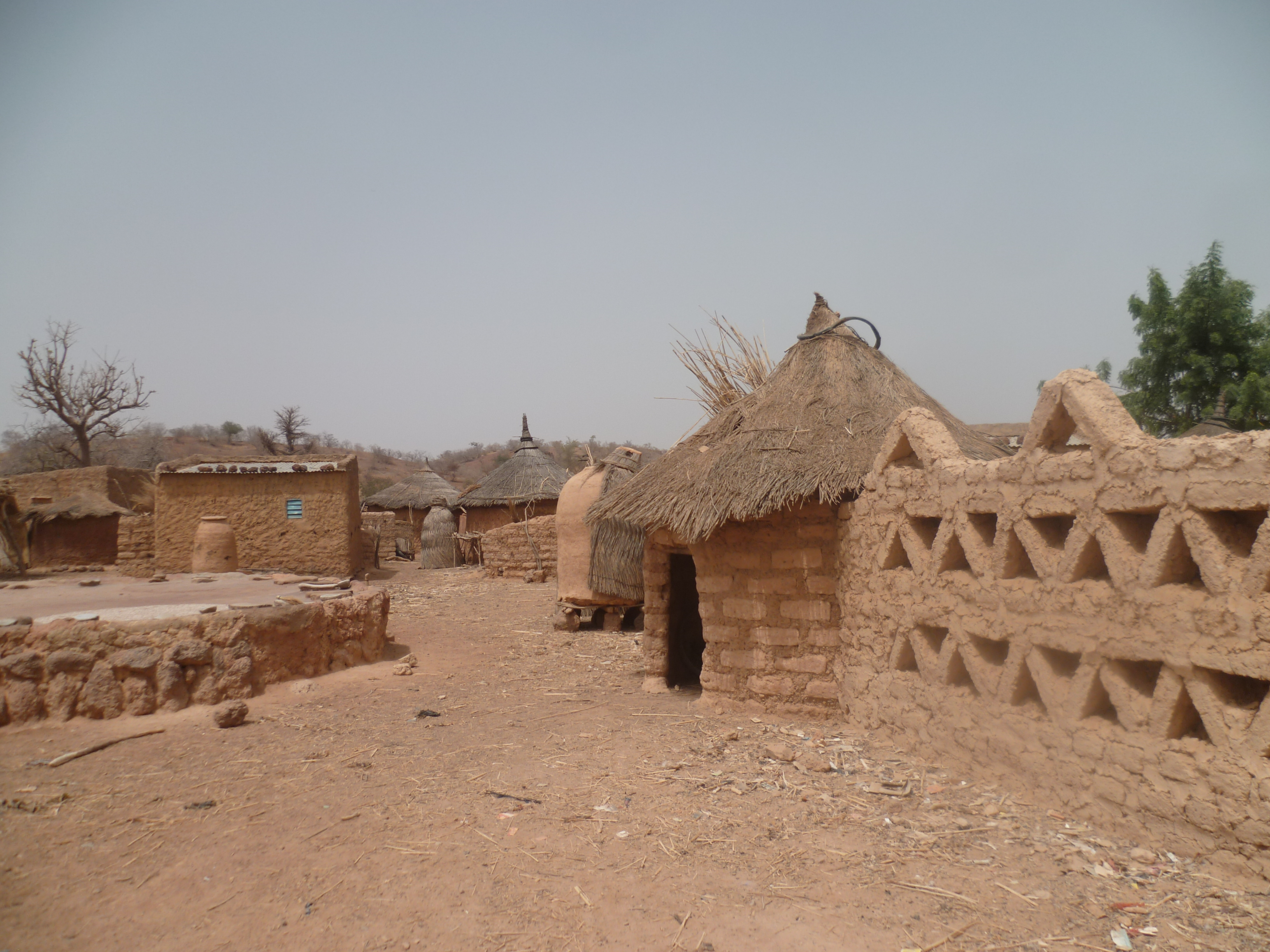
- A photograph of a street in Vousnango, Burkina Faso, 2017.

- Location in Burkina Faso
- Coordinates: 13°9′N 1°38′W
- Country: Burkina Faso
- Region: Centre-Nord Region
- Province: Bam Province
- Department: Guibare Department

Population (2019)
  - Total: 3,580
- Time zone: UTC+0 (GMT 0)

Vousnango is a town in the Guibare Department of Bam Province in northern Burkina Faso.

Population
Year	Pop.	±%
1985	1,417	—
2006	2,155	+52.1%
2019	3,580	+66.1%
