= Kora, Burkina Faso =

Village in Kongoussi Department, Burkina Faso

Kora
- Location in Burkina Faso
- Coordinates: 13°23′N 1°33′W
- Country: Burkina Faso
- Region: Centre-Nord Region
- Province: Bam Province
- Department: Kongoussi Department

Population (2019)
  - Total: 3,304
- Time zone: UTC+0 (GMT 0)

Kora is a town in the Kongoussi Department of Bam Province in northern Burkina Faso.

Population
Year	Pop.	±%
1985	1,323	—
2006	1,877	+41.9%
2019	3,304	+76.0%
