= Rilgo =

Village in Rouko Department, Burkina Faso

Rilgo Riligo
- Country: Burkina Faso
- Region: Centre-Nord Region
- Province: Bam Province
- Department: Rouko Department

Population (2019)
  - Total: 1,019
- Time zone: +2

Rilgo is a village in the Rouko Department of Bam Province in northern-central Burkina Faso.

Population
Year	Pop.	±%
1985	628	—
2006	929	+47.9%
2019	1,019	+9.7%
