= Ouintini =

Village in Sabce Department, Burkina Faso

- Location in Burkina Faso
- Coordinates: 13°13′N 1°20′W
- Country: Burkina Faso
- Region: Centre-Nord Region
- Province: Bam Province
- Department: Sabce Department

Population (2019)
  - Total: 853
- Time zone: +2

Ouintini is a village in the Sabce Department of Bam Province in northern-central Burkina Faso.

Population
Year	Pop.	±%
1985	576	—
2006	761	+32.1%
2019	853	+12.1%
