= Dinguilga =

Village in Kongoussi Department, Burkina Faso

- Location in Burkina Faso
- Coordinates: 13°24′N 1°42′W
- Country: Burkina Faso
- Region: Centre-Nord Region
- Province: Bam Province
- Department: Kongoussi Department

Population (2019)
  - Total: 521
- Time zone: UTC+0 (GMT 0)

Dinguilga is a village in the Kongoussi Department of Bam Province in northern Burkina Faso.

Population
Year	Pop.	±%
1985	177	—
2006	358	+102.3%
2019	521	+45.5%
