= Temnaoré-Foulbé =

Village in Kongoussi Department, Burkina Faso

- Interactive map of Temnaoré-Foulbé
- Country: Burkina Faso
- Region: Centre-Nord Region
- Province: Bam Province
- Department: Kongoussi Department

Population (2019)
  - Total: 216
- Time zone: UTC+0 (GMT 0)

Temnaoré-Foulbé is a village in the Kongoussi Department of Bam Province in northern Burkina Faso. It has a population of 108.

Population
Year	Pop.	±%
2005	108	—
2019	216	+100.0%
