= Toéssin-Foulbé =

Village in Rollo Department, Burkina Faso

- Interactive map of Toéssin-Foulbé
- Country: Burkina Faso
- Region: Centre-Nord Region
- Province: Bam Province
- Department: Rollo Department

Population (2019)
  - Total: 1,148
- Time zone: UTC+0 (GMT 0)

Toéssin-Foulbé is a village in the Rollo Department of Bam Province in northern Burkina Faso.

Population
Year	Pop.	±%
1985	82	—
2006	1,148	+1300.0%
2019	326	−71.6%
