= Daribiti =

Daribiti may refer to:

- Daribiti (13°20′N 1°27′W), a village in the Kongoussi Department of Bam Province in northern Burkina Faso
- Daribiti (13°26′N 1°45′W), a village in the Kongoussi Department of Bam Province in northern Burkina Faso
