= Koundoula =

Village in Guibare Department, Burkina Faso

- Location in Burkina Faso
- Coordinates: 13°6′N 1°41′W
- Country: Burkina Faso
- Region: Centre-Nord Region
- Province: Bam Province
- Department: Guibare Department

Population (2019)
  - Total: 5,468
- Time zone: UTC+0 (GMT 0)

Koundoula is a town in the Guibare Department of Bam Province in northern Burkina Faso.

Population
Year	Pop.	±%
1985	1,519	—
2006	2,795	+84.0%
2019	5,468	+95.6%
