= Yalga =

Yalga may refer to:

- Yalga, Burkina Faso, a town in Bam Province of Burkina Faso
- Yalga, Russia, name of several inhabited localities in Russia
