= Sam, Kongoussi =

Village in Kongoussi Department, Burkina Faso

Sam
- Location in Burkina Faso
- Coordinates: 13°25′N 1°41′W
- Country: Burkina Faso
- Region: Centre-Nord Region
- Province: Bam Province
- Department: Kongoussi Department

Population (2019)
  - Total: 1,367
- Time zone: UTC+0 (GMT 0)

Sam is a village in the Kongoussi Department of Bam Province in northern Burkina Faso.

Population
Year	Pop.	±%
1985	472	—
2006	845	+79.0%
2019	1,367	+61.8%
