= Niangouèla =

Village in Guibare Department, Burkina Faso

Niangouèla Niangwela
- Location in Burkina Faso
- Coordinates: 13°8′N 1°40′W
- Country: Burkina Faso
- Region: Centre-Nord Region
- Province: Bam Province
- Department: Guibare Department

Population (2019)
  - Total: 4,942
- Time zone: UTC+0 (GMT 0)

Niangouèla is a town in the Guibare Department of Bam Province in northern Burkina Faso.

Population
Year	Pop.	±%
1985	2,118	—
2006	3,392	+60.2%
2019	4,942	+45.7%
