= Yilou, Burkina Faso =

Village in Guibare Department, Burkina Faso

Yilou Ylou
- Location in Burkina Faso
- Coordinates: 13°1′N 1°33′W
- Country: Burkina Faso
- Region: Centre-Nord Region
- Province: Bam Province
- Department: Guibare Department

Population (2019)
  - Total: 4,674
- Time zone: UTC+0 (GMT 0)

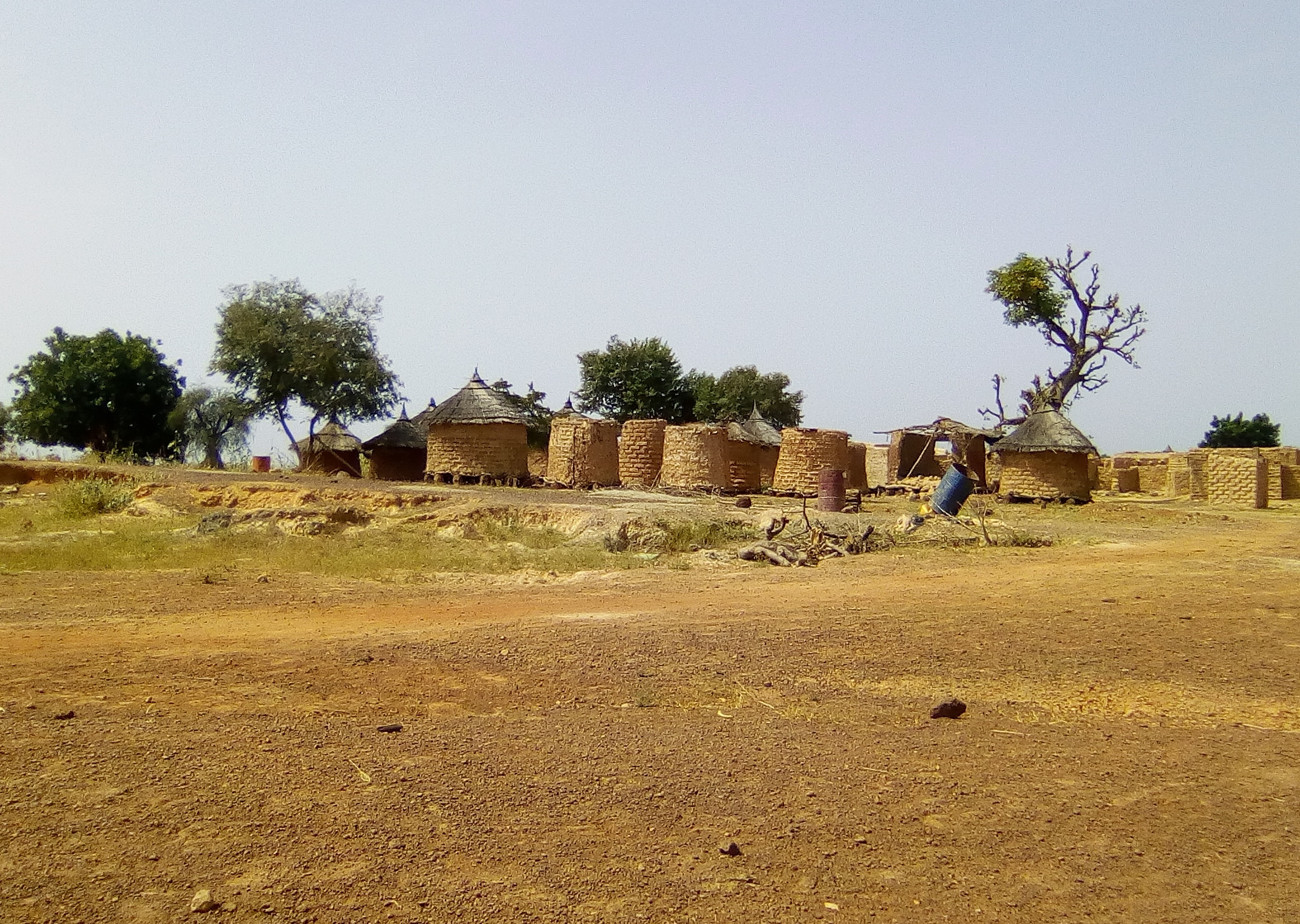
Image of the village

Yilou is a town in the Guibare Department of Bam Province in northern Burkina Faso. It has a population of 3,487.

Population
Year	Pop.	±%
1985	2,160	—
2006	3,696	+71.1%
2019	4,674	+26.5%
