= Sakou-Foulbé =

Village in Kongoussi Department, Burkina Faso

- Country: Burkina Faso
- Region: Centre-Nord Region
- Province: Bam Province
- Department: Kongoussi Department

Population (2019)
  - Total: 93
- Time zone: UTC+0 (GMT 0)

Sakou-Foulbé is a village in the Kongoussi Department of Bam Province in northern Burkina Faso.

Population
Year	Pop.	±%
1985	51	—
2006	65	+27.5%
2019	93	+43.1%
