= Badinogo-2 =

Village in Kongoussi Department, Burkina Faso

- Location in Burkina Faso
- Coordinates: 13°20′19″N 1°35′47″W
- Country: Burkina Faso
- Region: Centre-Nord Region
- Province: Bam Province
- Department: Kongoussi Department

Population (2019)
  - Total: 806
- Time zone: UTC+0 (GMT 0)

Badinogo is a village in the Kongoussi Department of Bam Province in northern Burkina Faso. It lies to the west of Kongoussi. It is sometimes listed as Badinogo-2 to distinguish it from the larger village Badinogo-1 which lies north of Kongoussi.

Population
| Year | Pop. | ±% |
|---|---|---|
| 2006 | 546 | — |
| 2019 | 806 | +47.6% |
