= Loagha-Foulbé =

Village in Kongoussi Department, Burkina Faso

- Country: Burkina Faso
- Region: Centre-Nord Region
- Province: Bam Province
- Department: Kongoussi Department

Population (2019)
  - Total: 84
- Time zone: UTC+0 (GMT 0)

Loagha-Foulbé is a village in the Kongoussi Department of Bam Province in northern Burkina Faso.

Population
Year	Pop.	±%
2005	56	—
2019	84	+50.0%
