= Kangaré =

Village in Rollo Department, Burkina Faso

Kangaré Kagare
- Location in Burkina Faso
- Coordinates: 13°36′N 1°51′W
- Country: Burkina Faso
- Region: Centre-Nord Region
- Province: Bam Province
- Department: Rollo Department

Population (2019)
  - Total: 4,182
- Time zone: UTC+0 (GMT 0)

Kangaré is a town in the Rollo Department of Bam Province in northern Burkina Faso.

Population
Year	Pop.	±%
1985	1,909	—
2006	2,569	+34.6%
2019	4,182	+62.8%
