= Raka, Burkina Faso =

Village in Rouko Department, Burkina Faso

Coordinates: 13°10′13″N 1°38′03″W

Raka
- Interactive map of Raka
- Country: Burkina Faso
- Region: Centre-Nord Region
- Province: Bam Province
- Department: Rouko Department

Population (2019)
  - Total: 1,034
- Time zone: +2

Raka is a village in the Rouko Department of Bam Province in northern-central Burkina Faso.

Population
Year	Pop.	±%
1985	406	—
2006	676	+66.5%
2019	1,034	+53.0%
