= Sampalo =

Village in Nassere Department, Burkina Faso

Stampalo Sampalo, Sampala
- Country: Burkina Faso
- Region: Centre-Nord Region
- Province: Bam Province
- Department: Nassere Department

Population (2019)
  - Total: 1,090
- Time zone: UTC+0 (GMT 0)

Sampalo is a village in the Nassere Department of Bam Province in northern Burkina Faso.

Population
Year	Pop.	±%
1985	639	—
2006	920	+44.0%
2019 (estimate)	1,090	+18.5%
