= Ouenné =

Village in Rollo Department, Burkina Faso

- Location in Burkina Faso
- Coordinates: 13°35′N 1°44′W
- Country: Burkina Faso
- Region: Centre-Nord Region
- Province: Bam Province
- Department: Rollo Department

Population (2019)
  - Total: 713
- Time zone: UTC+0 (GMT 0)

Ouenné is a village in the Rollo Department of Bam Province in northern Burkina Faso.

Population
Year	Pop.	±%
1985	239	—
2006	414	+73.2%
2019	713	+72.2%
