= Silmidougou =

Village in Rouko Department, Burkina Faso

- Country: Burkina Faso
- Region: Centre-Nord Region
- Province: Bam Province
- Department: Rouko Department

Population (2019)
  - Total: 2,296
- Time zone: +2

Silmidougou is a town in the Rouko Department of Bam Province in northern-central Burkina Faso.

Population
Year	Pop.	±%
1985	1,222	—
2006	1,552	+27.0%
2019	2,296	+47.9%
