= Tora, Burkina Faso =

Village in Nassere Department, Burkina Faso

Tora
- Country: Burkina Faso
- Region: Centre-Nord Region
- Province: Bam Province
- Department: Nassere Department

Population (2019)
  - Total: 662
- Time zone: UTC+0 (GMT 0)

Tora is a village in the Nassere Department of Bam Province in northern Burkina Faso.

Population
Year	Pop.	±%
1985	358	—
2006	559	+56.1%
2019 (estimate)	662	+18.4%
