= Siméon Sawadogo =

Burkinabé politician

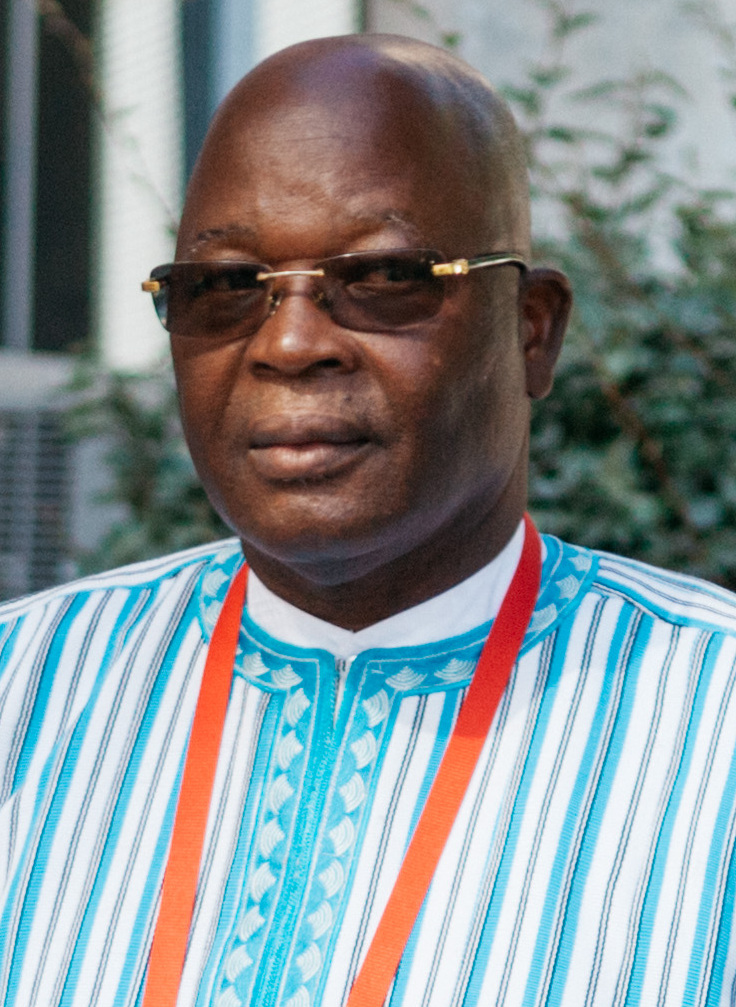
- Siméon Sawadogo in 2021

Minister of State, Territorial Administration, Decentralization and Social Cohesion
- Incumbent
- Assumed office 24 January 2019

Minister of Territorial Administration
- In office 20 February 2017 – 19 January 2019

Personal details
- Born: Sabcé, Bam Province, Burkina Faso
- Education: University of Joseph Ki-Zerbo

Siméon Sawadogo is a Burkinabé politician. He is currently the Minister of State, the Minister of Territorial Administration, the Minister of Decentralization and Social Cohesion.

== Biography ==
Siméon Sawadogo was born in Sabcé, Bam Province. He earned a master's degree from University of Joseph Ki-Zerbo (present-day University of Ouagadougou). In 1982, he began his career in the public service as a teacher of primary schools. In 1994, he joined the Ministry of Territorial Administration as High Commissioner of the Oubritenga Province in Ziniaré, then of Sanmatenga Province in Kaya. From 1997 to 2007, he was elected a member of the National Assembly.

On 20 February 2017, he was appointed the Minister of State for Territorial Administration. On 19 January 2019, he resigned together with other members of Thieba cabinet. On 24 January, he was appointed the Minister of State, Territorial Administration, the Minister of Decentralization and Social Cohesion.

== Health ==
During the 2020 coronavirus outbreak, on 21 March, Sawadogo contracted the coronavirus.
