= Tamponga =

Village in Kongoussi Department, Burkina Faso

- Location in Burkina Faso
- Coordinates: 13°26′N 1°33′W
- Country: Burkina Faso
- Region: Centre-Nord Region
- Province: Bam Province
- Department: Kongoussi Department

Population (2019)
  - Total: 938
- Time zone: UTC+0 (GMT 0)

Tamponga is a village in the Kongoussi Department of Bam Province in northern Burkina Faso.

Population
Year	Pop.	±%
1985	332	—
2006	508	+53.0%
2019	938	+84.6%
