= Siguinvoussé, Sabcé =

Village in Sabce Department, Burkina Faso

Siguinvoussé
- Country: Burkina Faso
- Region: Centre-Nord Region
- Province: Bam Province
- Department: Sabcé Department

Population (2019)
  - Total: 840
- Time zone: +2

Siguinvoussé is a village in the Sabcé Department of Bam Province in northern-central Burkina Faso.

Population
Year	Pop.	±%
2006	974	—
2019	840	−13.8%
