= Goungla =

Village in Sabce Department, Burkina Faso

- Location in Burkina Faso
- Coordinates: 13°10′N 1°34′W
- Country: Burkina Faso
- Region: Centre-Nord Region
- Province: Bam Province
- Department: Sabce Department

Population (2019)
  - Total: 1,244
- Time zone: +2

Goungla is a village in the Sabce Department of Bam Province in northern-central Burkina Faso.

Population
Year	Pop.	±%
1985	494	—
2006	894	+81.0%
2019	1,244	+39.1%
