= Nongsom =

Village in Kongoussi Department, Burkina Faso

- Location in Burkina Faso
- Coordinates: 13°27′N 1°41′W
- Country: Burkina Faso
- Region: Centre-Nord Region
- Province: Bam Province
- Department: Kongoussi Department

Population (2019)
  - Total: 1,011
- Time zone: UTC+0 (GMT 0)

Nongsom is a village in the Kongoussi Department of Bam Province in northern Burkina Faso.

Population
Year	Pop.	±%
1985	338	—
2005	606	+79.3%
2019	1,011	+66.8%
