= Yamané, Bam =

Village in Rouko Department, Burkina Faso

Yamané
- Interactive map of Yamané
- Coordinates: 13°11′05″N 1°43′49″W
- Country: Burkina Faso
- Region: Centre-Nord Region
- Province: Bam Province
- Department: Rouko Department

Population (2019)
  - Total: 480
- Time zone: +2

Yamané is a village in the Rouko Department of Bam Province in northern-central Burkina Faso.

Population
Year	Pop.	±%
1985	169	—
2006	141	−16.6%
2019	480	+240.4%
