= Noh, Burkina Faso =

Village in Sabce Department, Burkina Faso

Noh
- Location in Burkina Faso
- Coordinates: 13°14′N 1°30′W
- Country: Burkina Faso
- Region: Centre-Nord Region
- Province: Bam Province
- Department: Sabce Department

Population (2019)
  - Total: 1,311
- Time zone: +2

Noh is a town in the Sabce Department of Bam Province in northern-central Burkina Faso.

Population
Year	Pop.	±%
1985	1,551	—
2006	2,367	+52.6%
2019	1,311	−44.6%
