= Kiella =

Village in Kongoussi Department, Burkina Faso

- Location in Burkina Faso
- Coordinates: 13°33′N 1°47′W
- Country: Burkina Faso
- Region: Centre-Nord Region
- Province: Bam Province
- Department: Kongoussi Department

Population (2019)
  - Total: 2,814
- Time zone: UTC+0 (GMT 0)

Kiella is a town in the Kongoussi Department of Bam Province in northern Burkina Faso.

Population
Year	Pop.	±%
1985	907	—
2006	1,758	+93.8%
2019	2,814	+60.1%
