= Rouko-Foulbé =

Village in Rouko Department, Burkina Faso

Coordinates: 13°10′57″N 01°38′09″W

- Interactive map of Rouko-Foulbé
- Country: Burkina Faso
- Region: Centre-Nord Region
- Province: Bam Province
- Department: Rouko Department

Population (2019)
  - Total: 852
- Time zone: +2

Rouko-Foulbé is a village in the Rouko Department of Bam Province in northern-central Burkina Faso.

Population
Year	Pop.	±%
1985	100	—
2006	162	+62.0%
2019	852	+425.9%
