= Ouéguéla =

Village in Sabce Department, Burkina Faso

- Country: Burkina Faso
- Region: Centre-Nord Region
- Province: Bam Province
- Department: Sabce Department

Population (2019)
  - Total: 372
- Time zone: +2

Ouéguéla is a village in the Sabce Department of Bam Province in northern-central Burkina Faso.

Population
| Year | Pop. | ±% |
|---|---|---|
| 1985 | 178 | — |
| 2006 | 215 | +20.8% |
| 2019 | 372 | +73.0% |
