= Nakindougou =

Village in Kongoussi Department, Burkina Faso

- Country: Burkina Faso
- Region: Centre-Nord Region
- Province: Bam Province
- Department: Kongoussi Department

Population (2019)
  - Total: 877
- Time zone: UTC+0 (GMT 0)

Nakindougou is a village in the Kongoussi Department of Bam Province in northern Burkina Faso.

Population
Year	Pop.	±%
1985	292	—
2006	507	+73.6%
2019	877	+73.0%
