= Mafoulou-Foulbé =

Village in Sabce Department, Burkina Faso

- Country: Burkina Faso
- Region: Centre-Nord Region
- Province: Bam Province
- Department: Sabce Department

Population (2019)
  - Total: 231
- Time zone: +2

Mafoulou-Foulbé is a village in the Sabce Department of Bam Province in northern-central Burkina Faso.

Population
Year	Pop.	±%
1985	150	—
2006	158	+5.3%
2019	231	+46.2%
