= Lourgou =

Village in Kongoussi Department, Burkina Faso

- Location in Burkina Faso
- Coordinates: 13°24′N 1°41′W
- Country: Burkina Faso
- Region: Centre-Nord Region
- Province: Bam Province
- Department: Kongoussi Department

Population (2019)
  - Total: 714
- Time zone: UTC+0 (GMT 0)

Lourgou is a village in the Kongoussi Department of Bam Province in northern Burkina Faso.

Population
| Year | Pop. | ±% |
|---|---|---|
| 1985 | 335 | — |
| 2006 | 532 | +58.8% |
| 2019 | 714 | +34.2% |
