= Béguemdéré =

Village in Nassere Department, Burkina Faso

- Country: Burkina Faso
- Region: Centre-Nord Region
- Province: Bam Province
- Department: Nassere Department

Population (2019)
  - Total: 1,326
- Time zone: UTC+0 (GMT 0)

Béguemdéré is a town in the Nassere Department of Bam Province in northern Burkina Faso.

Population
Year	Pop.	±%
1985	700	—
2006	1,119	+59.9%
2019 (estimate)	1,326	+18.5%
