= Kounkoubguin =

Village in Rouko Department, Burkina Faso

- Country: Burkina Faso
- Region: Centre-Nord Region
- Province: Bam Province
- Department: Rouko Department

Population (2019)
  - Total: 2,154
- Time zone: UTC+2

Kounkoubguin is a town in the Rouko Department of Bam Province in northern-central Burkina Faso.

Population
Year	Pop.	±%
1985	826	—
2006	1,091	+32.1%
2019	2,154	+97.4%
