= Tibtenga-Fulbé =

Village in Nassere Department, Burkina Faso

- Country: Burkina Faso
- Region: Centre-Nord Region
- Province: Bam Province
- Department: Nassere Department

Population (2019)
  - Total: 201
- Time zone: UTC+0 (GMT 0)

Tibtenga-Fulbé is a village in the Nassere Department of Bam Province in northern Burkina Faso.

Population
| Year | Pop. | ±% |
|---|---|---|
| 2006 | 170 | — |
| 2019 (estimate) | 201 | +18.2% |
