= Kobséré =

Village in Rollo Department, Burkina Faso

- Location in Burkina Faso
- Coordinates: 13°39′N 1°48′W
- Country: Burkina Faso
- Region: Centre-Nord Region
- Province: Bam Province
- Department: Rollo Department

Population (2019)
  - Total: 1,031
- Time zone: UTC+0 (GMT 0)

Kobséré is a village in the Rollo Department of Bam Province in northern Burkina Faso.

Population
Year	Pop.	±%
1985	564	—
2006	747	+32.4%
2019	1,031	+38.0%
