= Barsa, Burkina Faso =

Village in Guibare Department, Burkina Faso

Barsa
- Location in Burkina Faso
- Coordinates: 13°06′N 1°38′W
- Country: Burkina Faso
- Region: Centre-Nord Region
- Province: Bam Province
- Department: Guibare Department

Population (2019)
  - Total: 954

Barsa is a town in Bam Province, Burkina Faso.

Population
Year	Pop.	±%
1985	403	—
2006	676	+67.7%
2019	954	+41.1%
