= Imieré =

Village in Kongoussi Department, Burkina Faso

Imieré Imyere
- Location in Burkina Faso
- Coordinates: 13°26′32″N 1°41′43″W
- Country: Burkina Faso
- Region: Centre-Nord Region
- Province: Bam Province
- Department: Kongoussi Department

Population (2019)
  - Total: 833
- Time zone: UTC+0 (GMT 0)

Imieré is a village in the Kongoussi Department of Bam Province in northern Burkina Faso.

Population
Year	Pop.	±%
1985	193	—
2006	557	+188.6%
2019	833	+49.6%
