= Yougounini =

Village in Kongoussi Department, Burkina Faso

- Location in Burkina Faso
- Coordinates: 13°17′N 1°38′W
- Country: Burkina Faso
- Region: Centre-Nord Region
- Province: Bam Province
- Department: Kongoussi Department

Population (2019)
  - Total: 1,669
- Time zone: UTC+0 (GMT 0)

Yougounini is a town in the Kongoussi Department of Bam Province in northern Burkina Faso. It has a population of 1,273.

Population
Year	Pop.	±%
1985	722	—
2006	1,125	+55.8%
2019	1,669	+48.4%
