= Sorgho-Peulh =

Village in Sabce Department, Burkina Faso

- Country: Burkina Faso
- Region: Centre-Nord Region
- Province: Bam Province
- Department: Sabce Department

Population (2019)
  - Total: 78
- Time zone: +2

Sorgho-Peulh is a village in the Sabce Department of Bam Province in northern-central Burkina Faso.

Population
Year	Pop.	±%
1985	602	—
2006	63	−89.5%
2019	78	+23.8%
