= Badinogo =

Badinogo may refer to:

- Badinogo-1, village north of Kongoussi, Burkina Faso
- Badinogo-2, village west of Kongoussi, Burkina Faso
