= Sorgho-Yargo =

Village in Kongoussi Department, Burkina Faso

- Location in Burkina Faso
- Coordinates: 13°17′N 1°35′W
- Country: Burkina Faso
- Region: Centre-Nord Region
- Province: Bam Province
- Department: Kongoussi Department

Population (2019)
  - Total: 1,485
- Time zone: UTC+0 (GMT 0)

Sorgho-Yargo is a village in the Kongoussi Department of Bam Province in northern Burkina Faso.

Population
Year	Pop.	±%
2006	962	—
2019	1,485	+54.4%
