= Loagha =

Village in Kongoussi Department, Burkina Faso

Loagha Loga
- Location in Burkina Faso
- Coordinates: 13°19′N 1°39′W
- Country: Burkina Faso
- Region: Centre-Nord Region
- Province: Bam Province
- Department: Kongoussi Department

Population (2019)
  - Total: 2,529
- Time zone: UTC+0 (GMT 0)

Loagha is a town in the Kongoussi Department of Bam Province in northern Burkina Faso.

Population
Year	Pop.	±%
1985	1,125	—
2006	1,789	+59.0%
2019	2,529	+41.4%
