= Zandkom =

Village in Sabce Department, Burkina Faso

- Location in Burkina Faso
- Coordinates: 13°8′N 1°33′W
- Country: Burkina Faso
- Region: Centre-Nord Region
- Province: Bam Province
- Department: Sabce Department

Population (2019)
  - Total: 2,810
- Time zone: +2

Zandkom is a town in the Sabce Department of Bam Province in northern-central Burkina Faso.

Population
Year	Pop.	±%
1985	864	—
2006	1,523	+76.3%
2019	2,810	+84.5%
