= Foursa =

Village in Sabce Department, Burkina Faso

- Location in Burkina Faso
- Coordinates: 13°11′N 1°18′W
- Country: Burkina Faso
- Region: Centre-Nord Region
- Province: Bam Province
- Department: Sabce Department

Population (2019)
  - Total: 206
- Time zone: +2

Foursa is a village in the Sabce Department of Bam Province in northern-central Burkina Faso.

Population
Year	Pop.	±%
2006	363	—
2019	206	−43.3%
