= Sakoudi =

Village in Guibare Department, Burkina Faso

- Location in Burkina Faso
- Coordinates: 13°5′N 1°40′W
- Country: Burkina Faso
- Region: Centre-Nord Region
- Province: Bam Province
- Department: Guibare Department

Population (2019)
  - Total: 1,937
- Time zone: UTC+0 (GMT 0)

Sakoudi is a village in the Guibare Department of Bam Province in northern Burkina Faso.

Population
| Year | Pop. | ±% |
|---|---|---|
| 1985 | 405 | — |
| 2006 | 1,208 | +198.3% |
| 2019 | 1,937 | +60.3% |
