= Rounou =

Village in Sabce Department, Burkina Faso

- Location in Burkina Faso
- Coordinates: 13°12′N 1°33′W
- Country: Burkina Faso
- Region: Centre-Nord Region
- Province: Bam Province
- Department: Sabce Department

Population (2019)
  - Total: 699
- Time zone: +2

Rounou is a village in the Sabce Department of Bam Province in northern-central Burkina Faso.

Population
| Year | Pop. | ±% |
|---|---|---|
| 2006 | 481 | — |
| 2019 | 699 | +45.3% |
