= Bogonam =

Village in Kongoussi Department, Burkina Faso

Coordinates: 13°22′57″N 1°40′48″W

- Interactive map of Bogonam
- Country: Burkina Faso
- Region: Centre-Nord Region
- Province: Bam Province
- Department: Kongoussi Department

Population (2019)
  - Total: 497
- Time zone: UTC+0 (GMT 0)

Bogonam is a village in the Kongoussi Department of Bam Province in northern Burkina Faso.

Population
Year	Pop.	±%
1985	305	—
2006	2,172	+612.1%
2019	497	−77.1%
