= Birou =

Village in Kongoussi Department, Burkina Faso

- Location in Burkina Faso
- Coordinates: 13°18′09″N 1°39′26″W
- Country: Burkina Faso
- Region: Centre-Nord Region
- Province: Bam Province
- Department: Kongoussi Department

Population (2019)
  - Total: 935
- Time zone: UTC+0 (GMT 0)

Birou is a village in the Kongoussi Department of Bam Province in northern Burkina Faso.

Population
Year	Pop.	±%
2006	636	—
2019	935	+47.0%
