= Souryala =

Village in Sabce Department, Burkina Faso

- Location in Burkina Faso
- Coordinates: 13°13′N 1°26′W
- Country: Burkina Faso
- Region: Centre-Nord Region
- Province: Bam Province
- Department: Sabce Department

Population (2019)
  - Total: 1,201
- Time zone: +2

Souryala is a village in the Sabce Department of Bam Province in northern-central Burkina Faso.

Population
Year	Pop.	±%
1985	615	—
2006	949	+54.3%
2019	1,201	+26.6%
