= Sakou =

Village in Kongoussi Department, Burkina Faso

- Location in Burkina Faso
- Coordinates: 13°21′N 1°39′W
- Country: Burkina Faso
- Region: Centre-Nord Region
- Province: Bam Province
- Department: Kongoussi Department

Population (2019)
  - Total: 1,865
- Time zone: UTC+0 (GMT 0)

Sakou is a town in the Kongoussi Department of Bam Province in northern Burkina Faso.

Population
Year	Pop.	±%
1985	1,044	—
2006	1,419	+35.9%
2019	1,865	+31.4%
