= Kangaré-Foulbé =

Village in Rollo Department, Burkina Faso

Kangaré-Foulbé Kagaré-Foulbé
- Country: Burkina Faso
- Region: Centre-Nord Region
- Province: Bam Province
- Department: Rollo Department

Population (2019)
  - Total: 311
- Time zone: UTC+0 (GMT 0)

Kangaré-Foulbé is a village in the Rollo Department of Bam Province in northern Burkina Faso.

Population
Year	Pop.	±%
1985	244	—
2006	484	+98.4%
2019	311	−35.7%
