= Sankondé =

Village in Kongoussi Department, Burkina Faso

Sankondé Sankoude
- Location in Burkina Faso
- Coordinates: 13°19′N 1°36′W
- Country: Burkina Faso
- Region: Centre-Nord Region
- Province: Bam Province
- Department: Kongoussi Department

Population (2019)
  - Total: 577
- Time zone: UTC+0 (GMT 0)

Sankondé is a village in the Kongoussi Department of Bam Province in northern Burkina Faso.

Population
Year	Pop.	±%
1985	120	—
2006	331	+175.8%
2019	577	+74.3%
