= Kougrisséogo =

Village in Kongoussi Department, Burkina Faso

- Country: Burkina Faso
- Region: Centre-Nord Region
- Province: Bam Province
- Department: Kongoussi Department

Population (2019)
  - Total: 104
- Time zone: UTC+0 (GMT 0)

Kougrisséogo is a village in the Kongoussi Department of Bam Province in northern Burkina Faso.

Population
Year	Pop.	±%
2006	66	—
2019	104	+57.6%
