= Boulguin =

Village in Rollo Department, Burkina Faso

Boulguin Bouloughin
- Country: Burkina Faso
- Region: Centre-Nord Region
- Province: Bam Province
- Department: Rollo Department

Population (2005)
  - Total: 1,025
- Time zone: UTC+0 (GMT 0)

Boulguin is a town in the Rollo Department of Bam Province in northern Burkina Faso.

Population
Year	Pop.	±%
1985	597	—
2006	1,230	+106.0%
2019	1,185	−3.7%
