= Zingguima =

Village in Kongoussi Department, Burkina Faso

Zingguima Ziniguima
- Location in Burkina Faso
- Coordinates: 13°25′N 1°43′W
- Country: Burkina Faso
- Region: Centre-Nord Region
- Province: Bam Province
- Department: Kongoussi Department

Population (2019)
  - Total: 1,615
- Time zone: UTC+0 (GMT 0)

Zingguima is a village in the Kongoussi Department of Bam Province in northern Burkina Faso.

Population
Year	Pop.	±%
1985	384	—
2006	1,120	+191.7%
2019	1,615	+44.2%
