= Loungo =

Village in Sabce Department, Burkina Faso

Coordinates: 12°52′N 2°26′W

- Interactive map of Loungo
- Country: Burkina Faso
- Region: Centre-Nord Region
- Province: Bam Province
- Department: Sabce Department

Population (2019)
  - Total: 844
- Time zone: +2

Loungo is a village in the Sabce Department of Bam Province in northern-central Burkina Faso.

Population
Year	Pop.	±%
1985	388	—
2006	635	+63.7%
2019	844	+32.9%
