= Zoura-Foulbé =

Village in Kongoussi Department, Burkina Faso

- Location in Burkina Faso
- Coordinates: 13.278°N 1.4626°W
- Country: Burkina Faso
- Region: Centre-Nord Region
- Province: Bam Province
- Department: Kongoussi Department

Population (2019)
  - Total: 471
- Time zone: UTC+0 (GMT 0)

Zoura-Foulbé is a village in the Kongoussi Department of Bam Province in northern Burkina Faso.

Population
Year	Pop.	±%
2006	649	—
2019	471	−27.4%
