= Kouka, Bam =

Village in Kongoussi Department, Burkina Faso

Kouka
- Location within Burkina Faso
- Coordinates: 13°26′N 1°37′W
- Country: Burkina Faso
- Region: Centre-Nord Region
- Province: Bam Province
- Department: Kongoussi Department

Population (2019)
  - Total: 1,370
- Time zone: UTC+0 (GMT)

Kouka is a village in Kongoussi Department, Bam Province, Burkina Faso.

Population
Year	Pop.	±%
1985	1,098	—
2006	858	−21.9%
2019	1,370	+59.7%
