= Senopoguian =

Village in Kongoussy Department, Burkina Faso

- Country: Burkina Faso
- Region: Centre-Nord Region
- Province: Bam Province
- Department: Kongoussi Department

Population (2011)
  - Total: 23
- Time zone: UTC+0 (GMT 0)

Senopoguian is a village in the Kongoussi Department of Bam Province in northern Burkina Faso.

Population
Year	Pop.	±%
2006	85	—
2019	87	+2.4%
