= Pogoro-Foulbé =

Village in Rollo Department, Burkina Faso

- Country: Burkina Faso
- Region: Centre-Nord Region
- Province: Bam Province
- Department: Rollo Department

Population (2019)
  - Total: 314
- Time zone: UTC+0 (GMT 0)

Pogoro-Foulbé is a village in the Rollo Department of Bam Province in northern Burkina Faso.

Population
Year	Pop.	±%
1985	165	—
2006	1,014	+514.5%
2019	314	−69.0%
