= Sika, Burkina Faso =

Village in Nassere Department, Burkina Faso

Sika
- Country: Burkina Faso
- Region: Centre-Nord Region
- Province: Bam Province
- Department: Nassere Department

Population (2019)
  - Total: 737
- Time zone: UTC+0 (GMT 0)

Sika is a village in the Nassere Department of Bam Province in northern Burkina Faso.

Population
Year	Pop.	±%
1985	431	—
2006	622	+44.3%
2019 (estimate)	737	+18.5%
