= Gonsé =

Village in Kongoussi Department, Burkina Faso

- Country: Burkina Faso
- Region: Centre-Nord Region
- Province: Bam Province
- Department: Kongoussi Department

Population (2019)
  - Total: 178
- Time zone: UTC+0 (GMT 0)

Gonsé is a village in the Kongoussi Department of Bam Province in northern Burkina Faso.

Population
Year	Pop.	±%
1985	64	—
2005	56	−12.5%
2019	178	+217.9%
