= Sabcé Department =

Department in Bam Province, Burkina Faso

Coordinates: 13°11′52″N 1°31′18″W

Sabce
- Department
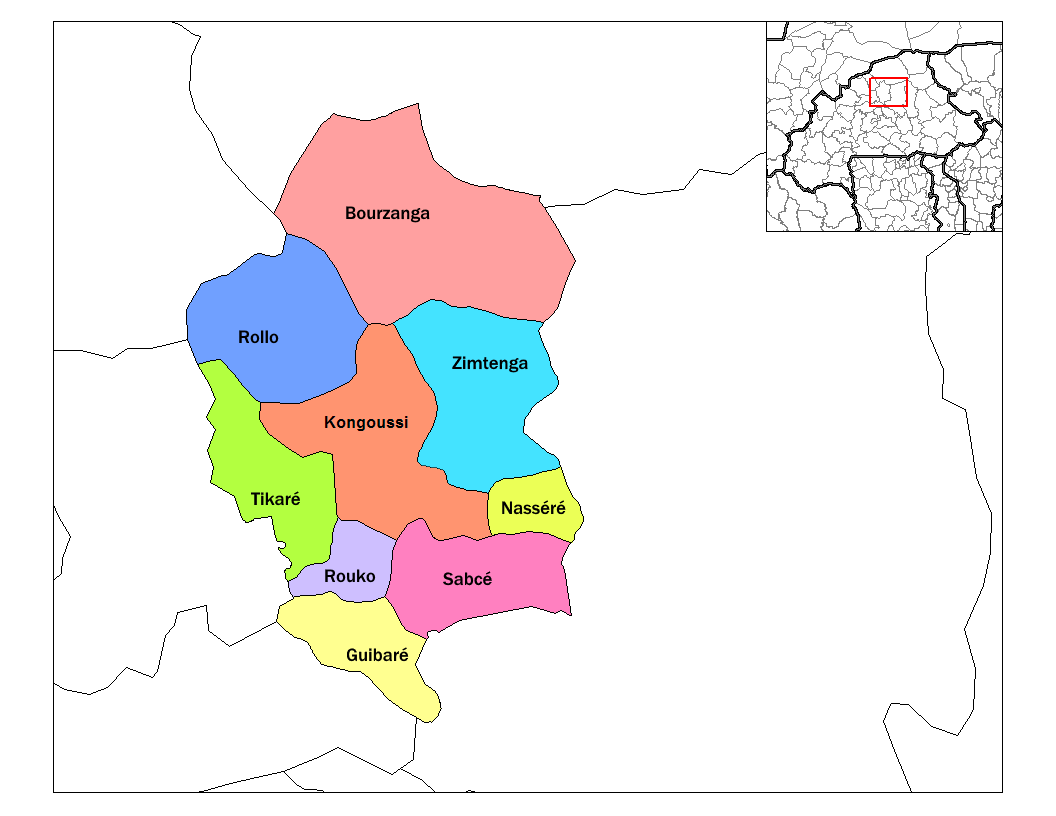
- Sabce Department location in the province
- Country: Burkina Faso
- Region: Centre-Nord Region
- Province: Bam Province

Population (1996)
  - Total: 22,282
- Time zone: UTC+0 (GMT 0)

Sabce is a department or commune of Bam Province in north-western Burkina Faso. Its capital lies at the town of Sabce. According to the 1996 census the department has a total population of 22,282.

== Towns and villages ==
· Sabce · Bangrin · Bissa · Boussouma · Foursa · Goungla · Imiougou · Koumnogo · Kougsabla · Koukoundi · Loungo · Lefourba · Lefourba-Foulbé · Mafoulou · Mafoulou-Foulbé · Noh · Ouéguéla · Ouintini · Ouintini · Ouazélé · Ronguin · Rounou · Sanhoui · Siguinvoussé · Souryala · Sorgho-Peulh · Tanga-Pela · Toublongo · Zandkom · Zandkom-Peulh
