= Daribiti no. 2 =

Village in Kongoussi Department, Burkina Faso

Daribiti
- Location in Burkina Faso
- Coordinates: 13°20′N 1°27′W
- Country: Burkina Faso
- Region: Centre-Nord Region
- Province: Bam Province
- Department: Kongoussi Department

Population (2019)
  - Total: 1,002
- Time zone: UTC+0 (GMT 0)

Daribiti is a village in the Kongoussi Department of Bam Province in northern Burkina Faso.

Population
Year	Pop.	±%
2006	578	—
2019	1,002	+73.4%
