= Pogoro, Bam =

Village in Rollo Department, Burkina Faso

Pogoro
- Location in Burkina Faso
- Coordinates: 13°37′09″N 1°48′17″W
- Country: Burkina Faso
- Region: Centre-Nord Region
- Province: Bam Province
- Department: Rollo Department

Population (2019)
  - Total: 3,567
- Time zone: UTC+0 (GMT 0)

Pogoro is a town in the Rollo Department of Bam Province in northern Burkina Faso.

Population
Year	Pop.	±%
1985	1,414	—
2006	1,441	+1.9%
2019	3,567	+147.5%
