= Sikka =

Sikka may refer to:

- Sikka Regency, a regency in East Nusa Tenggara, Indonesia
- Sikka Kingdom, former monrachy in Indonesia
- Sikka people
- Sikka, Hebron
- Sikka, India, a town in Gujarat, India
- Sikka (surname), an Indian surname
- Sikka Club Beirut, a defunct association football club in Lebanon

== See also ==
- Sika (disambiguation)
- Sikh coinage
