= Bangrin, Sabcé =

Village in Sabce Department, Burkina Faso

Bangrin
- Location in Burkina Faso
- Country: Burkina Faso
- Region: Centre-Nord Region
- Province: Bam Province
- Department: Sabcé Department

Population (2019)
  - Total: 1,581
- Time zone: +2

Bangrin is a village in the Sabcé Department of Bam Province in northern-central Burkina Faso.

Population
| Year | Pop. | ±% |
|---|---|---|
| 2006 | 1,156 | — |
| 2019 | 1,581 | +36.8% |
