= Guibaré Department =

Department in Bam Province, Burkina Faso

Coordinates: 13°6′N 1°36′W

Guibare
- Department
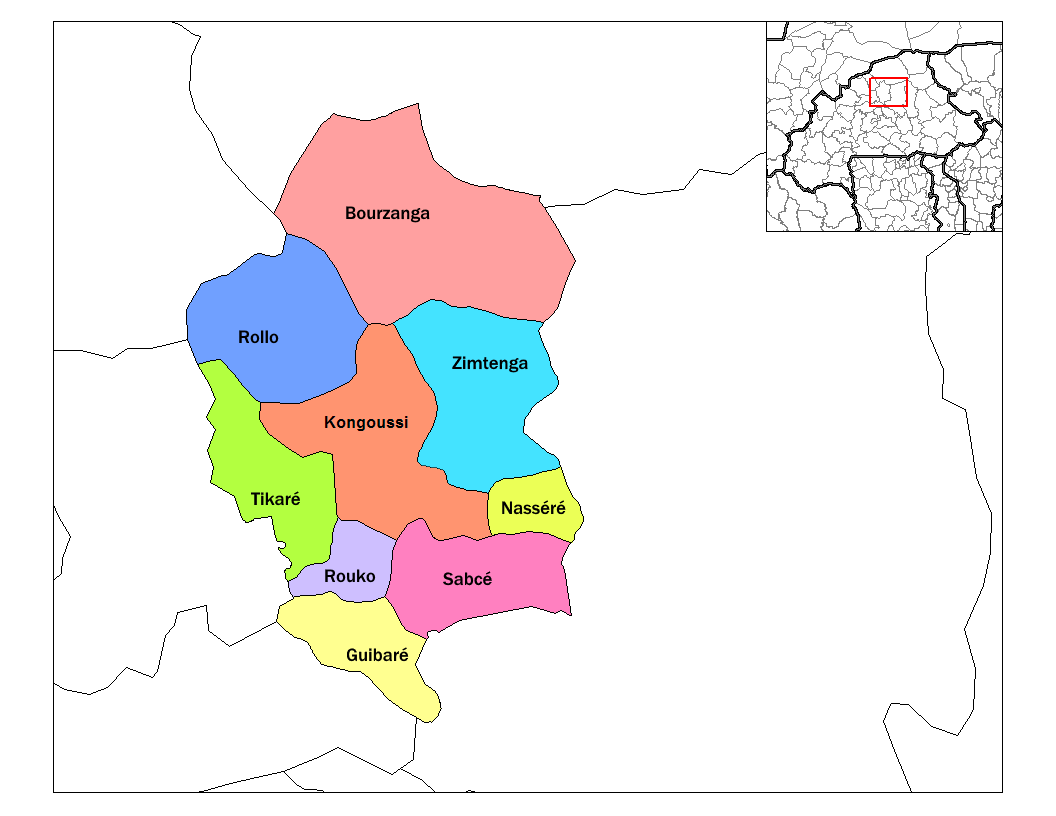
- Guibare Department location in the province
- Country: Burkina Faso
- Region: Centre-Nord Region
- Province: Bam Province

Population (1996)
  - Total: 22,510
- Time zone: UTC+0 (GMT 0)

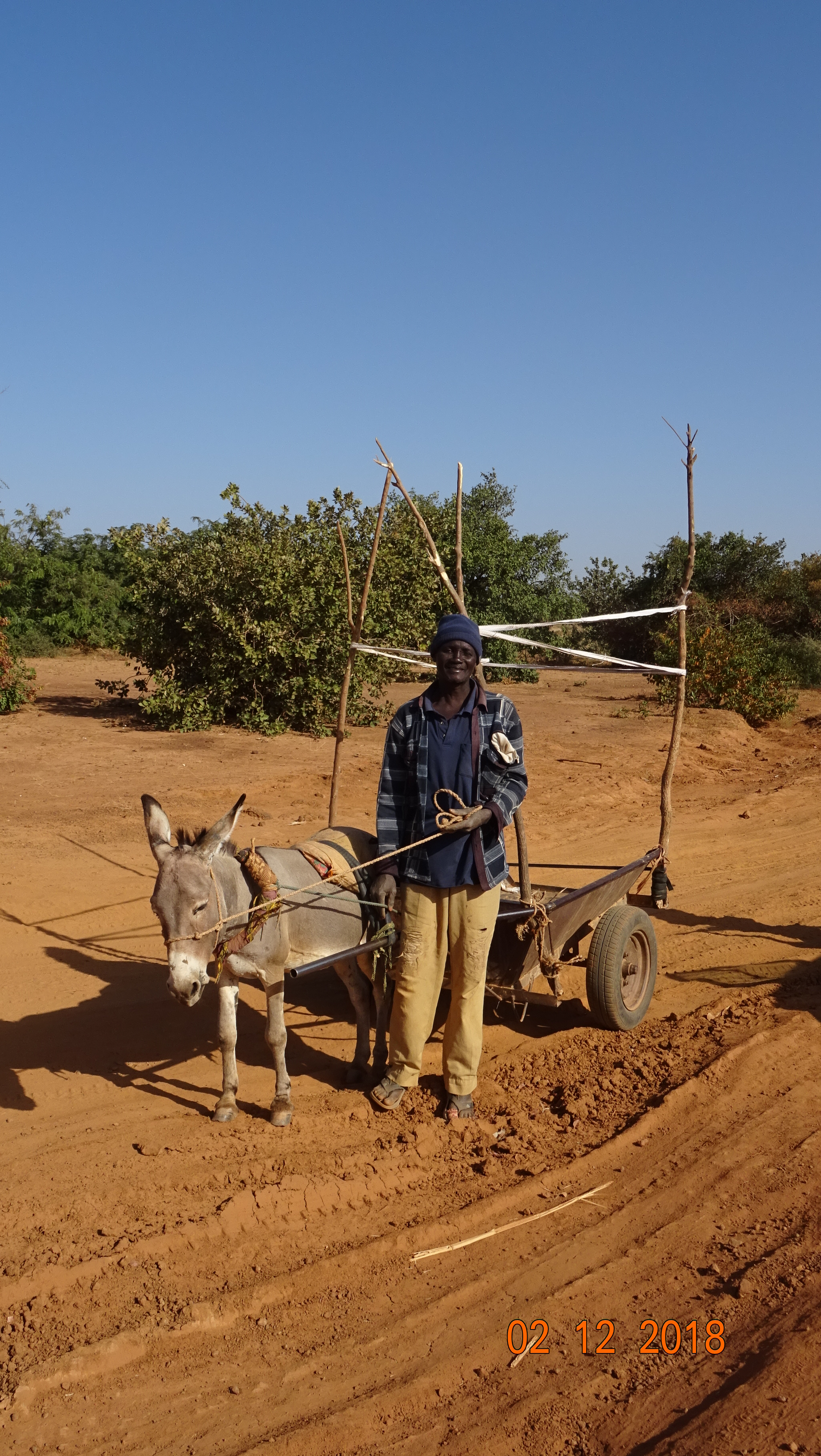
Man with donkey-drawn cart between Guibaré and Sabsé

Guibare is a department or commune of Bam Province in north-western Burkina Faso. Its capital lies at the town of Guibare. According to the 1996 census the department has a total population of 22,510.

== Towns and villages ==
- Guibare
- Barsa
- Bokin
- Gougré
- Karentenga
- Koundoula
- Sakoudi
- Niangouèla
- Sindri
- Vousnango
- Tontenga
- Wattinoma
- Yilou
