= Nasséré =

Village in Nasséré Department, Burkina Faso

- Interactive map of Nasséré
- Country: Burkina Faso
- Region: Centre-Nord
- Province: Bam
- Department: Nasséré

Population (2019)
  - Total: 1,184

Nasséré is a town in the Nasséré Department of Bam Province in northern-central Burkina Faso.

Population
Year	Pop.	±%
1985	639	—
2006	999	+56.3%
2019 (estimate)	1,184	+18.5%
