= Yalga, Burkina Faso =

Village in Kongoussi Department, Burkina Faso

Yalga
- Location in Burkina Faso
- Coordinates: 13°16′N 1°26′W
- Country: Burkina Faso
- Region: Centre-Nord Region
- Province: Bam Province
- Department: Kongoussi Department

Population (2019)
  - Total: 960
- Time zone: UTC+0 (GMT 0)

Yalga is a town in the Kongoussi Department of Bam Province in northern Burkina Faso.

Population
Year	Pop.	±%
2006	1,811	—
2019	960	−47.0%
