= Wattinoma =

Wattinoma may refer to:

Burkina Faso places:

- Wattinoma, Bam
- Wattinoma, Bazèga
- Wattinoma, Sourou
