= Kongoussi Department =

Department in Bam Province, Burkina Faso

Coordinates: 13°19′N 1°32′W

Kongoussi
- Department
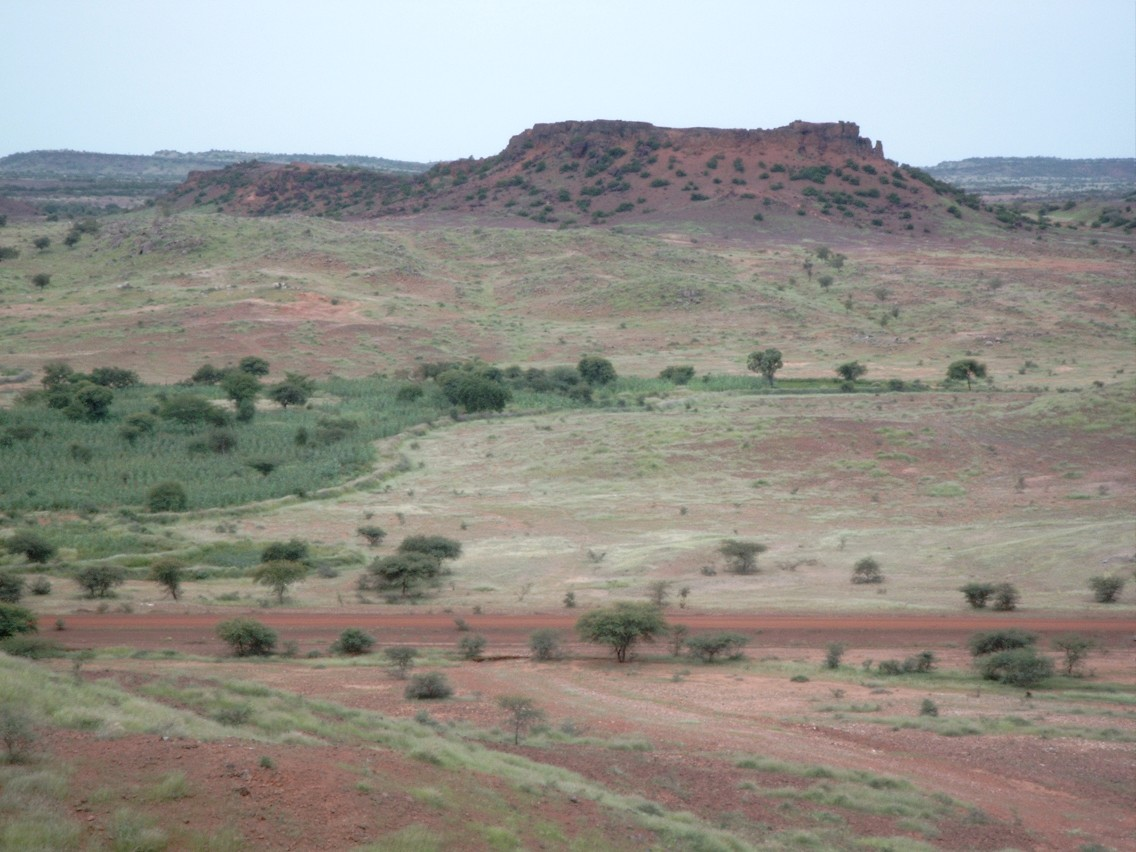
- Landscape between Dori and Yalgo

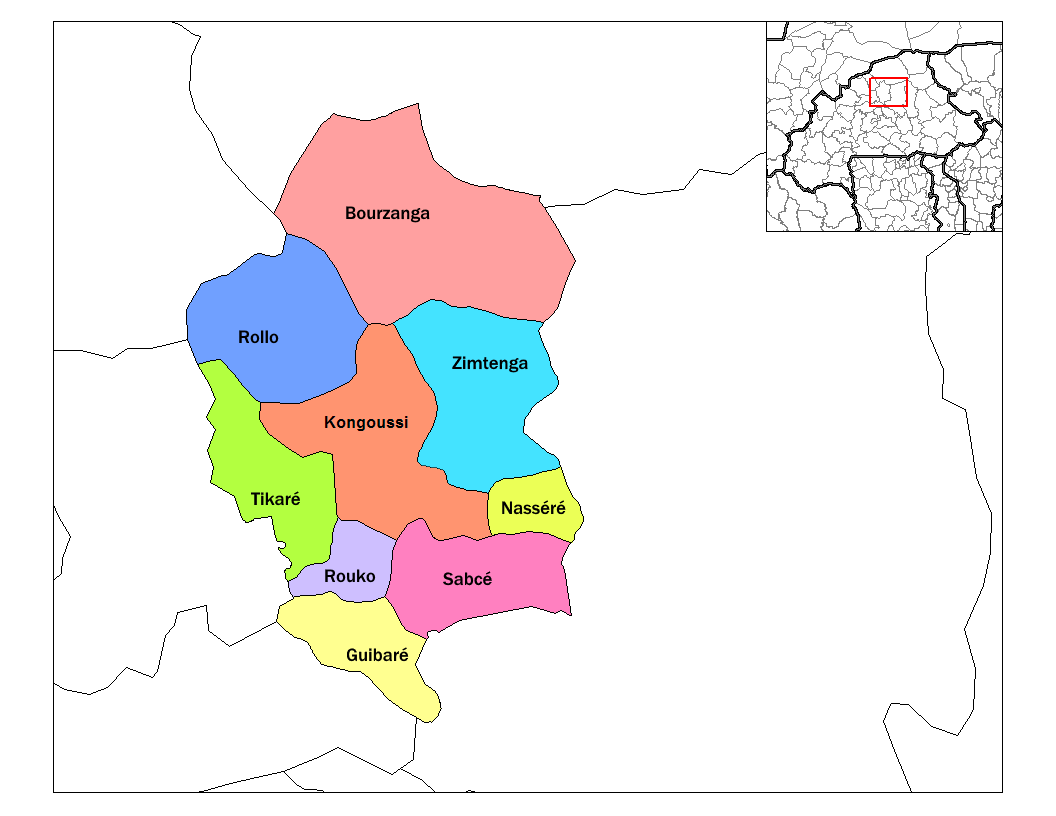
- Kongoussi Department location in the province
- Country: Burkina Faso
- Region: Centre-Nord Region
- Province: Bam Province

Area
  - Department: 253 sq mi (654 km^{2})

Population (2019 census)
  - Department: 121,585
  - Density: 482/sq mi (186/km^{2})
  - Urban: 53,627
- Time zone: UTC+0 (GMT 0)

Kongoussi is a department or commune of Bam Province in north-western Burkina Faso. Its capital is the town of Kongoussi. According to the 2019 census the department has a total population of 121,585.

== Towns and villages ==
- Kongoussi
- Badinogo (number 1)
- Badinogo (number 2)
- Birou
- Boalin
- Bogonam
- Bogonam-Foulbé
- Daribiti (number 1)
- Daribiti (number 2)
- Darigma
- Dinguilga
- Imieré
- Gonsé
- Kiella
- Kora
- Kora-Foulbé
- Kondibito
- Kougrisséogo
- Kouka
- Koumbango
- Kourpellé
- Loagha
- Loagha-Foulbé
- Lourgou
- Mogodin
- Nakindougou
- Niénéga-Mossi
- Niénéga-Foulbé
- Nongsom
- Nongsom-Foulbé
- Ranga
- Rambo-Wottionma
- Rissiam
- Sam
- Sakou
- Sakou-Foulbé
- Sandouré
- Sankondé
- Sargo
- Senopoguian
- Senorsingué
- Sorgho-Yargo
- Tamponga
- Tangaye
- Tanguiema
- Temnaoré
- Temnaoré-Foulbé
- Touka
- Woussé
- Yalga
- Yalgo
- Yalka
- Yougounini
- Zingguima
- Zoura
- Zoura-Foulbé
