= Toéssin, Rollo =

Village in Rollo Department, Burkina Faso

Toéssin, Bam
- Location in Burkina Faso
- Coordinates: 13°34′N 1°39′W
- Country: Burkina Faso
- Region: Centre-Nord Region
- Province: Bam Province
- Department: Rollo Department

Population (2019)
  - Total: 774
- Time zone: UTC+0 (GMT 0)

Toéssin, Bam is a village in the Rollo Department of Bam Province in northern Burkina Faso. It has a population primarily of the Yarse ethnic group (who are assimilated with the Mossi).

The village was known for community efforts to build soil and water conservation initiatives in the 1990s, supported by the German PATECORE project, and hosted development workers and researchers. Most of the central fields around the village had stone lines (diguettes) built by the villagers, designed to slow runoff from heavy rains and allowing it to infiltrate into the soil. It also has a primary school, and groundwater is pumped from a deep tube well.

Population
Year	Pop.	±%
1985	893	—
2006	1,045	+17.0%
2019	774	−25.9%
