= Zouhair (given name) =

Zouhair or Zouheir is a name of Arabic origin.

== List of people with the given name ==
- Zouhair Abdallah (born 1983), Lebanese footballer
- Zouhair Aouad (born 1989), Bahraini long-distance runner
- Zouhair Bahloul (born 1950), Israeli Arab sports broadcaster, journalist and politician
- Zouhair Bouadoud (born 1986), French-Moroccan footballer
- Zouheir Chokr (born 1947), Lebanese academic and diplomat
- Zouhair El Moutaraji (born 1996), Moroccan professional footballer
- Zouhair El-Ouardi (born 1977), Moroccan middle-distance runner
- Zouhair Feddal (born 1989), Moroccan politician
- Zouhair Khazim (born 1960), Syrian politician
- Zouhair Laaroubi (born 1984), Moroccan footballer
- Zouhair Maghzaoui (born 1965), Tunisian politician
- Zouhair Talbi (born 1995), Moroccan runner
- Zouhair Yahyaoui (1967–2005), Tunisian dissident

== List of people with the surname ==
- Assia Zouhair (born 1991), Moroccan footballer

== See also ==
- Zouair
