= Daribiti no. 1 =

Village in Kongoussi Department, Burkina Faso

Daribiti
- Location in Burkina Faso
- Coordinates: 13°26′N 1°45′W
- Country: Burkina Faso
- Region: Centre-Nord Region
- Province: Bam Province
- Department: Kongoussi Department

Population (2019)
  - Total: 1,635
- Time zone: UTC+0 (GMT 0)

Daribiti is a village in the Kongoussi Department of Bam Province in northern Burkina Faso.

Population
Year	Pop.	±%
2006	988	—
2019	1,635	+65.5%
