= Tangaye, Bam =

Village in Kongoussi Department, Burkina Faso

Tangaye
- Location in Burkina Faso
- Coordinates: 13°25′N 1°32′W
- Country: Burkina Faso
- Region: Centre-Nord Region
- Province: Bam Province
- Department: Kongoussi Department

Population (2019)
  - Total: 1,134
- Time zone: UTC+0 (GMT 0)

Tangaye is a village in the Kongoussi Department of Bam Province in northern Burkina Faso.

Population
Year	Pop.	±%
1985	396	—
2005	605	+52.8%
2019	1,134	+87.4%
