= Rollo Department =

Department in Bam Province, Burkina Faso

Coordinates: 13°35′58″N 1°42′21″W

Rollo
- Department
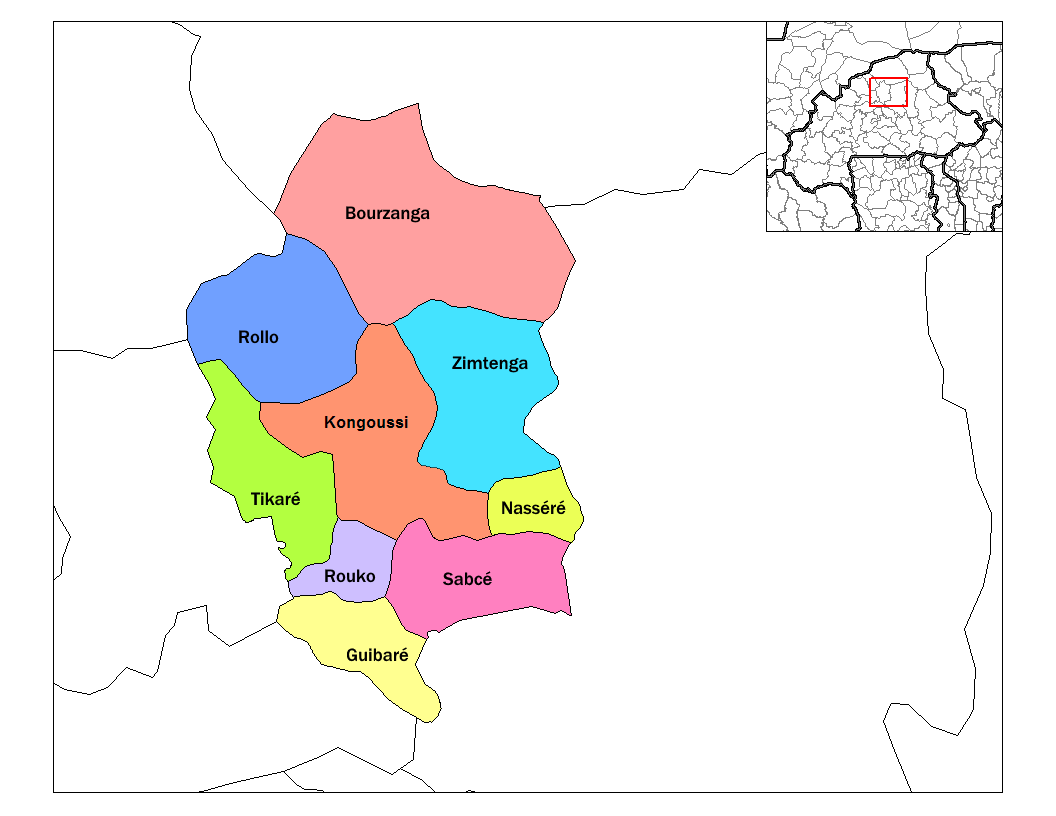
- Rollo Department location in the province
- Country: Burkina Faso
- Region: Centre-Nord Region
- Province: Bam Province

Population (1996)
  - Total: 25,631
- Time zone: UTC+0 (GMT 0)

Rollo is a department or commune of Bam Province in north-western Burkina Faso. Its capital lies at the town of Rollo. According to the 1996 census the department has a total population of 25,631. In 2007, as part of political decentralisation, new Mayors were elected to replace the existing local politicians. Issa Ouermi was elected mayor of the Rollo Department.

== Towns and villages ==
- Boulguin
- Gondékoubé
- Ibi
- Igondéga
- Kangaré
- Kangaré-Foulbé
- Kobséré
- Koulwéogo
- Lourfa
- Ouenné
- Ouittenga
- Pogoro
- Pogoro-Foulbé
- Rollo
- Tampouï
- Toéssin
- Toéssin-Foulbé
