= Guibare =

Village in Guibare Department, Burkina Faso

- Location in Burkina Faso
- Coordinates: 13°6′N 1°36′W
- Country: Burkina Faso
- Region: Centre-Nord Region
- Province: Bam Province
- Department: Guibare Department

Population (2019)
  - Total: 5,279
- Time zone: UTC+0 (GMT)

Guibare is a town in the Guibare Department of Bam Province in northern-central Burkina Faso. It is the capital of the Guibare Department.

Population
Year	Pop.	±%
1985	1,562	—
2006	2,874	+84.0%
2019	5,279	+83.7%
