= Rouko Department =

Department in Bam Province, Burkina Faso

Rouko
- Department
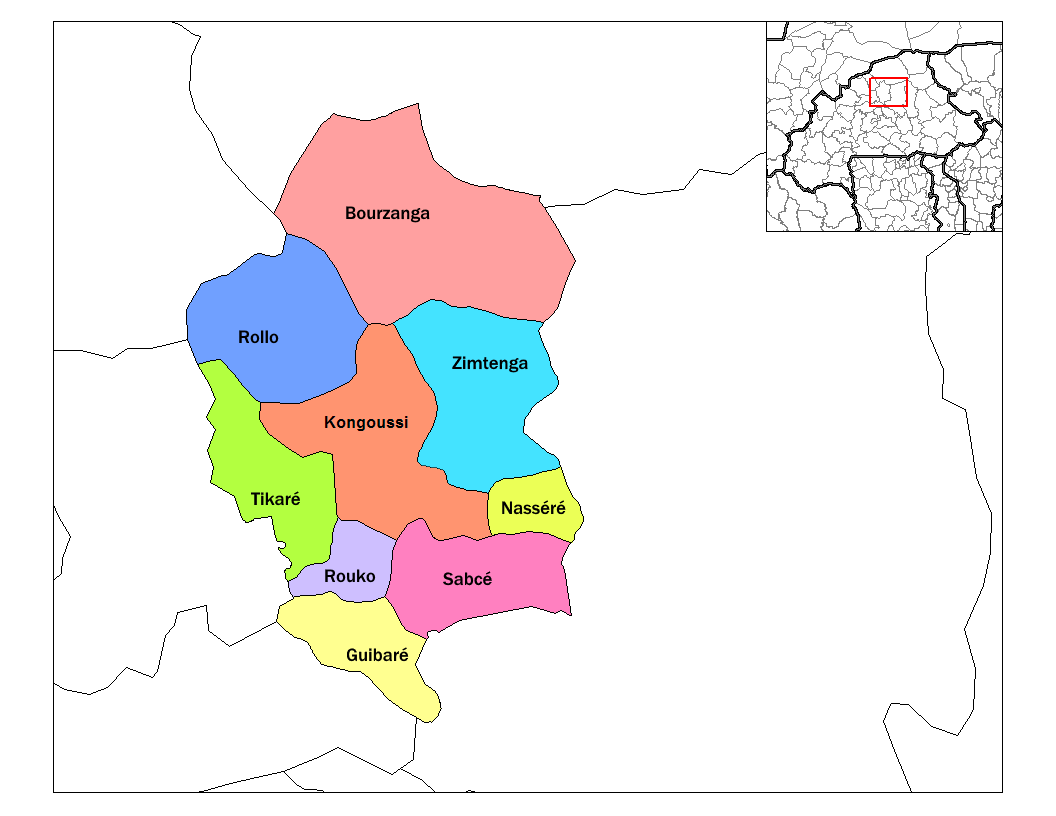
- Rouko Department location in the province
- Country: Burkina Faso
- Region: Centre-Nord Region
- Province: Bam Province

Population (1996)
  - Total: 13,175
- Time zone: UTC+0 (GMT 0)

Rouko is a department or commune of Bam Province in north-western Burkina Faso. Its capital lies at the town of Rouko. According to the 1996 census the department has a total population of 13,175.

== Towns and villages ==
Place	Population (2019)	Location
Rouko	9704	13°12′49″N 1°37′52″W
Gourgoudou	578	
Kounkoubguin	2154	
Pittenga	1908	13°12′10″N 1°40′19″W
Raka	1034	13°10′13″N 1°38′03″W
Rilgo	1019	
Rouko-Foulbé	852	13°10′57″N 01°38′09″W
Silmidougou	2296	
Yamané	480	13°11′05″N 1°43′49″W
Yaoghin	1000	
