= Bokin =

Bokin may refer to:

- Bokin, Bam, Burkina Faso
- Bokin, Boulkiemdé, Burkina Faso
- Bokin Department, in Passoré Province, Burkina Faso
- Bokin, Passoré, the capital of the above department
