= Zoura =

Village in Kongoussi Department, Burkina Faso

- Location in Burkina Faso
- Coordinates: 13°17′N 1°29′W
- Country: Burkina Faso
- Region: Centre-Nord Region
- Province: Bam Province
- Department: Kongoussi Department

Population (2019)
  - Total: 579
- Time zone: UTC+0 (GMT 0)

Zoura is a village in the Kongoussi Department of Bam Province in northern Burkina Faso.

Population
Year	Pop.	±%
1985	946	—
2006	960	+1.5%
2019	579	−39.7%
