= Sindre =

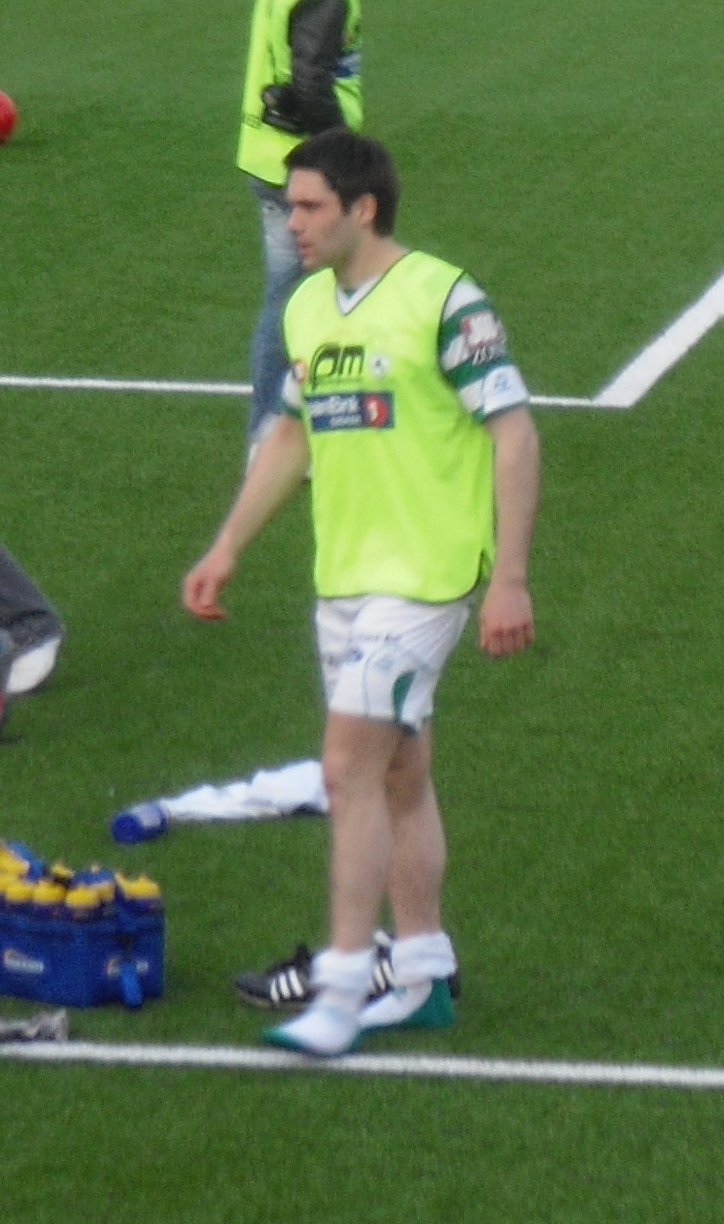
Norwegian footballer Sindre Marøy

Sindre may refer to:

- Rasmus Sindre (1859–1908), Norwegian farmer, newspaper editor and politician
- Sindre Walle Egeli (born 2006), Norwegian footballer
- Sindre Erstad (born 1982), Norwegian football defender
- Sindre Fossum Beyer (born 1977), Norwegian politician for the Labour Party
- Sindre Guldvog (born 1955), Norwegian publisher
- Sindre Iversen (born 1989), Norwegian snowboarder
- Sindre Marøy (born 1982), Norwegian retired football player, playing as an attacker

== See also ==
- Sandre
- Sindar
- Sindara
- Sindari
- Sinder
- Sindri (disambiguation)
