= Sindri, Burkina Faso =

Village in Guibare Department, Burkina Faso

Sindri
- Location in Burkina Faso
- Coordinates: 13°4′N 1°38′W
- Country: Burkina Faso
- Region: Centre-Nord Region
- Province: Bam Province
- Department: Guibare Department

Population (2019)
  - Total: 3,900
- Time zone: UTC+0 (GMT 0)

Sindri is a town in the Guibare Department of Bam Province in northern Burkina Faso.

Population
Year	Pop.	±%
1985	1,285	—
2006	2,397	+86.5%
2019	3,900	+62.7%
