= Bokin, Bam =

Village in Guibare Department, Burkina Faso

Bokin
- Location in Burkina Faso
- Coordinates: 13°7′N 1°36′W
- Country: Burkina Faso
- Region: Centre-Nord Region
- Province: Bam Province
- Department: Guibare Department

Population (2019)
  - Total: 1,427
- Time zone: UTC+0 (GMT 0)

Bokin is a village in the Guibare Department of Bam Province in northern Burkina Faso.

Population
Year	Pop.	±%
1985	462	—
2006	884	+91.3%
2019	1,427	+61.4%
