= Wattinoma, Bam =

Village in Guibare Department, Burkina Faso

Wattinoma
- Country: Burkina Faso
- Region: Centre-Nord Region
- Province: Bam Province
- Department: Guibare Department

Population (1996)
  - Total: 686
- Time zone: UTC+0 (GMT 0)

Wattinoma is a village in the Guibare Department of Bam Province in northern Burkina Faso.

Population
Year	Pop.	±%
1985	464	—
2006	738	+59.1%
2019	779	+5.6%
