= Toéssin, Bam =

Toéssin, Bam may refer to:

- Toéssin, Rollo, Burkina Faso
- Toéssin, Zimtenga, Burkina Faso
