= Rouko =

Village in Rouko Department, Burkina Faso

Rouko Rouko-Mossi
- Location in Burkina Faso
- Coordinates: 13°12′49″N 1°37′52″W
- Country: Burkina Faso
- Region: Centre-Nord Region
- Province: Bam Province
- Department: Rouko Department

Population (2019)
  - Total: 9,704

Rouko is a town in the Rouko Department of Bam Province in northern-central Burkina Faso. It is the capital of the Rouko Department.

Population
Year	Pop.	±%
1985	4,322	—
2006	6,918	+60.1%
2019	9,704	+40.3%
