= Bangrin =

Bangrin may refer to:

- Bangrin, Sabce, Burkina Faso
- Bangrin, Zimtenga, Burkina Faso
