= Nasséré Department =

Department in Bam Province, Burkina Faso

Coordinates: 13°20′N 1°22′W

Nasséré
- Department
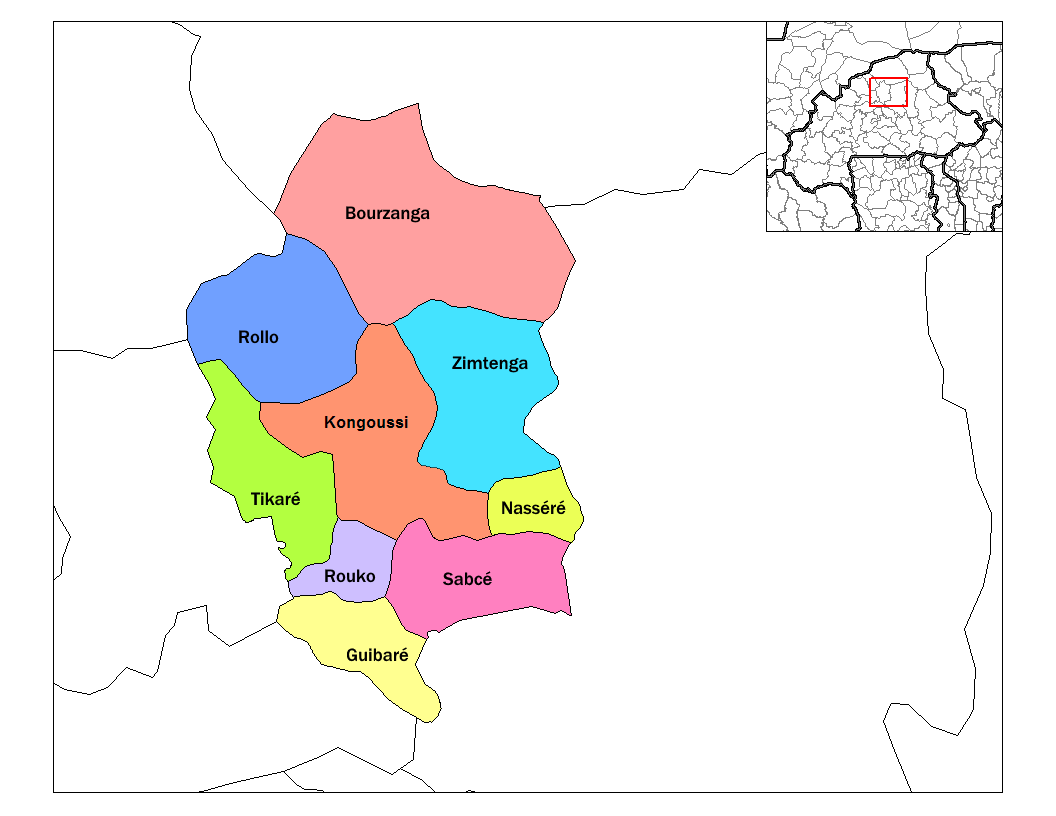
- Nassere Department location in the province
- Country: Burkina Faso
- Region: Centre-Nord Region
- Province: Bam Province

Population (1996)
  - Total: 10,591
- Time zone: UTC+0 (GMT 0)

Nasséré is a department or commune of Bam Province in north-western Burkina Faso. Its capital lies at the town of Nasséré. According to the 1996 census the department has a total population of 10,591.

== Towns and villages ==
- Nasséré
- Béguemdéré
- Biliga-Fulbé
- Biliga-Mossi
- Bilkaradié
- Fénéguéné
- Foutanga
- Kolladé
- Sampalo
- Sika
- Sillaléba
- Tamiga-Fulbé
- Tamiga-Mossi
- Tibtenga-Fulbé
- Tibtenga-Mossi
- Tora
