= Sindri =

Sindri may refer to:

- Sindri (Dhanbad), a neighbourhood in India
- Sindri (mythology), a dwarf or a hall in Norse mythology
- Sindri, Burkina Faso
- Sindri, a minor character in the 2008–2012 BBC series Merlin_(2008_TV_series), played by Tony Guilfoyle
- Sindri Sindrason, Icelandic journalist

== See also ==
- Sindris
