= Rollo, Burkina Faso =

Village in Rollo Department, Burkina Faso

Rollo
- Location within Burkina Faso, French West Africa
- Coordinates: 13°35′58″N 1°42′21″W
- Country: Burkina Faso
- Region: Centre-Nord Region
- Province: Bam Province
- Department: Rollo Department

Population (2019)
  - Total: 10,942
- Time zone: UTC+0 (GMT)

Rollo is a small town of 10,942 people and the capital of Rollo Department, Bam Province, Burkina Faso, West Africa. The Department of Rollo has 42,000 adults, and in 2007, as part of national political decentralisation, Issa Ouermi was elected mayor of Rollo Department.

Rollo is reached by an unmade road, taking half an hour by motorbike or considerably longer in a vehicle, from the main N-S Kongoussi-Bourzanga road that links Ouagadougou to the north of the country. Past Rollo to the west are many villages, before the Province of Yatenga is entered - its capital Ouahigouya, is a couple of hours away by motorbike.

There are a couple of small shops, an occasional restaurant, a couple of small government outposts including the Prefecture and the post of the resident agricultural extension agent, and a small Catholic mission. There is a weekly market, where local cloth may be purchased.

This part of Burkina Faso is dominated by Mossi people, and the language spoken is overwhelmingly More with a smattering of French and Fulfulde. The Mossi arrived in the region in the 14th century, and have co-mingled with the indigenous residents. There are also settlers from modern-day Mali, and animism coexists with Christianity and Islam. Life is still traditional in many ways, with mud brick housing predominating, although large towns like Kongoussi may be reached with minimal difficulty, permitting market trading, access to shops, the Kongoussi cinema, pharmacies, the hospital, etc. within 65 kilometres (40 mi).

Today, the town has electricity, and telephone. There is a dam (barrage) providing water for livestock, feeding off the ephemeral tributary that forms part of the Lac du Bam catchment of the Volta. The IMF paid for improvements under the national Projet Boulis et Petite Irrigation Villageoise program. Most residents farm or have livestock. The traditional farming lands surround the settlement, with land allocation largely controlled by the powerful village chief. There is a traditional cycle of seasonal festivals.

There have been occasional development efforts, such as the activities of the soil and water project PATECORE, and Saudi Arabia has funded many well-digging projects in the region. Tourists are almost nonexistent, and there are no attractions or visitor accommodation. There is basic schooling, but for the lycée (high school) pupils must relocate to Kongoussi. Rollo residents are found working much further afield - France, Ivory Coast, etc. and they return remittances to families or extended kin.

== Demographics ==
Population
Year	Pop.	±%
1985	3,625	—
2006	8,401	+131.8%
2019	10,942	+30.2%
