= Lake Bam =

Lake

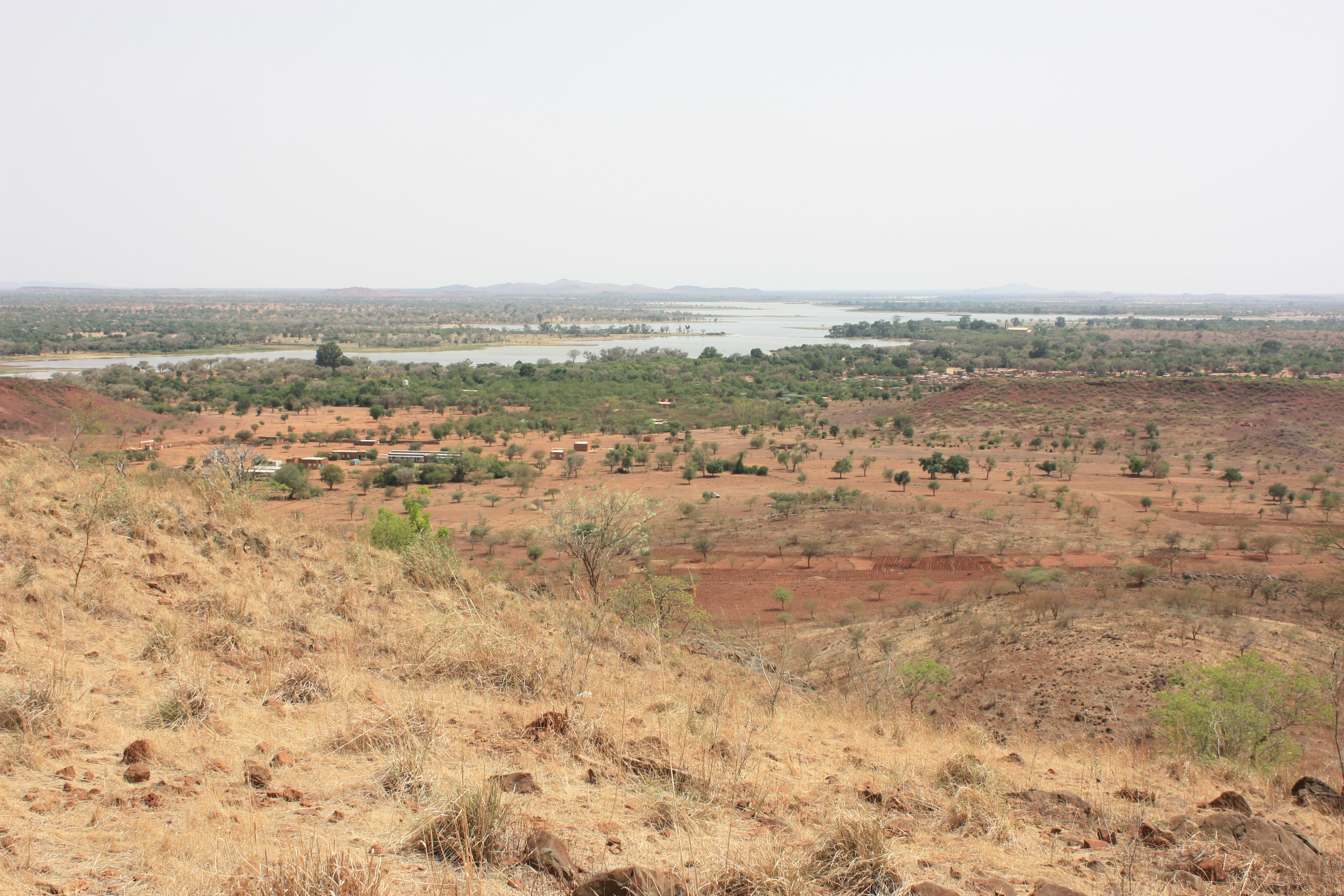
- Lake Bam, seen from the South

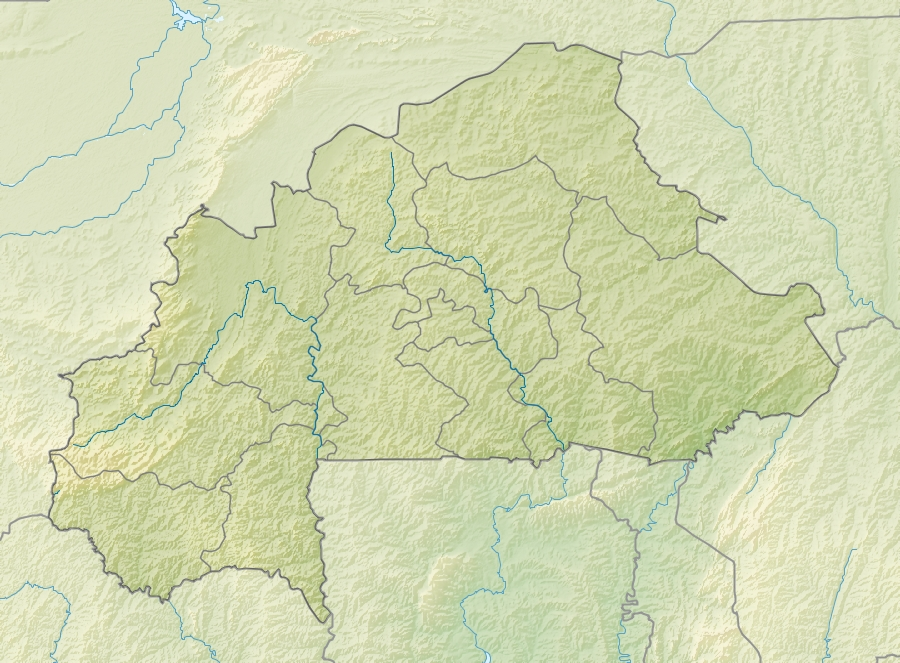
- Location within Burkina Faso
- Location: Kongoussi, Bam, Burkina Faso
- Coordinates: 13°24′06″N 1°31′03″W
- Basin countries: Burkina Faso

Ramsar Wetland
- Official name: Lac Bam
- Designated: 7 October 2009
- Reference no.: 1880

Lake Bam is located near the town of Kongoussi, in Burkina Faso. The lake is slowly drying up, putting at risk the nearby village's agriculture, fish stocks, and cattle watering. The lake has been designated as a Ramsar site since 2009.
