= Sabcé =

Village in Sabcé Department, Burkina Faso

Sabce
- Location in Burkina Faso
- Coordinates: 13°11′N 1°31′W
- Country: Burkina Faso
- Region: Centre-Nord Region
- Province: Bam Province
- Department: Sabce Department

Population (2019)
  - Total: 5,395
- Time zone: +2

Sabce is a town in the Sabce Department of Bam Province in northern-central Burkina Faso. It is the capital of the Sabce Department.

Population
Year	Pop.	±%
1985	2,320	—
2006	2,899	+25.0%
2019	5,395	+86.1%
