= Bagadogo =

- Location in Burkina Faso
- Coordinates: 11°54′N 1°22′W
- Country: Burkina Faso
- Region: Centre-Sud Region
- Province: Bazèga Province
- Department: Kombissiri Department

Population (2019)
  - Total: 369

Bagadogo is a village in the Kombissiri Department of Bazèga Province in central Burkina Faso.

Population
Year	Pop.	±%
1985	441	—
2006	349	−20.9%
2019	369	+5.7%
