= Tangaye, Gnagna =

Tangaye
- Interactive map of Tangaye
- Country: Burkina Faso
- Region: Est Region
- Province: Gnagna Province
- Department: Piéla Department

Population (2019)
  - Total: 4,645

Tangaye is a town in the Piéla Department of Gnagna Province in eastern Burkina Faso.

Population
Year	Pop.	±%
1985	888	—
2006	2,718	+206.1%
2019	4,645	+70.9%
