= Yalga, Russia =

Yalga (Russian: Ялга) is the name of several inhabited localities in Russia.

Urban localities

- Yalga, Republic of Mordovia, a work settlement under the administrative jurisdiction of Oktyabrsky City District of the city of republic significance of Saransk in the Republic of Mordovia

Rural localities

- Yalga, Irkutsk Oblast, a village in Olkhonsky District of Irkutsk Oblast
