= Sika, Rõuge Parish =

Village in Estonia

Sika
- Village
- Location within Estonia
- Coordinates: 57°43′29″N 26°58′32″E
- Country: Estonia
- County: Võru County
- Parish: Rõuge Parish
- Time zone: UTC+2 (EET)
  - Summer (DST): UTC+3 (EEST)

Sika is a village in Rõuge Parish, Võru County in Estonia.
