= Sikka (surname) =

Indian surname

Sikka is an Indian surname seen in northern part of India.

== Notable people ==
Notable people with the name include:

- Prem Sikka (born 1951), British professor of accounting
- Sonia Sikka, Canadian philosopher
- S. K. Sikka (1941–2023), Indian nuclear physicist and crystallographer
- Vishal Sikka (born 1967), Indian businessman and executive, Ex-CEO Infosys
