= Pogoro, Yatenga =

Pogoro
- Village
- Location in Burkina Faso
- Coordinates: 13°45′25″N 002°25′53″W
- Country: Burkina Faso
- Region: Nord Region
- Province: Yatenga Province
- Department: Koumbri Department
- Time zone: UTC+0 (GMT 0)
- UFI: -1722362

Pogoro (Pogoro Mossi) is a village in the Koumbri Department of Yatenga Province in northern Burkina Faso. It has a population of 925.
