= Kongoussi =

Village in Kongoussi Department, Burkina Faso

- City
- Location within Burkina Faso, French West Africa
- Coordinates: 13°20′N 1°32′W
- Country: Burkina Faso
- Region: Centre-Nord Region
- Province: Bam Province
- Department: Kongoussi Department
- Elevation: 302 m (991 ft)

Population (2019 census)
  - Total: 53,627
- Time zone: UTC+0 (GMT)

Kongoussi is a city located in Bam Province in central Burkina Faso, one of the world's poorest countries. It has a population of 53,627 (2019) and is the provincial capital. Mooré, the language of the Mossi people, is spoken along with French, common among those who have attended school or spent time further afield.

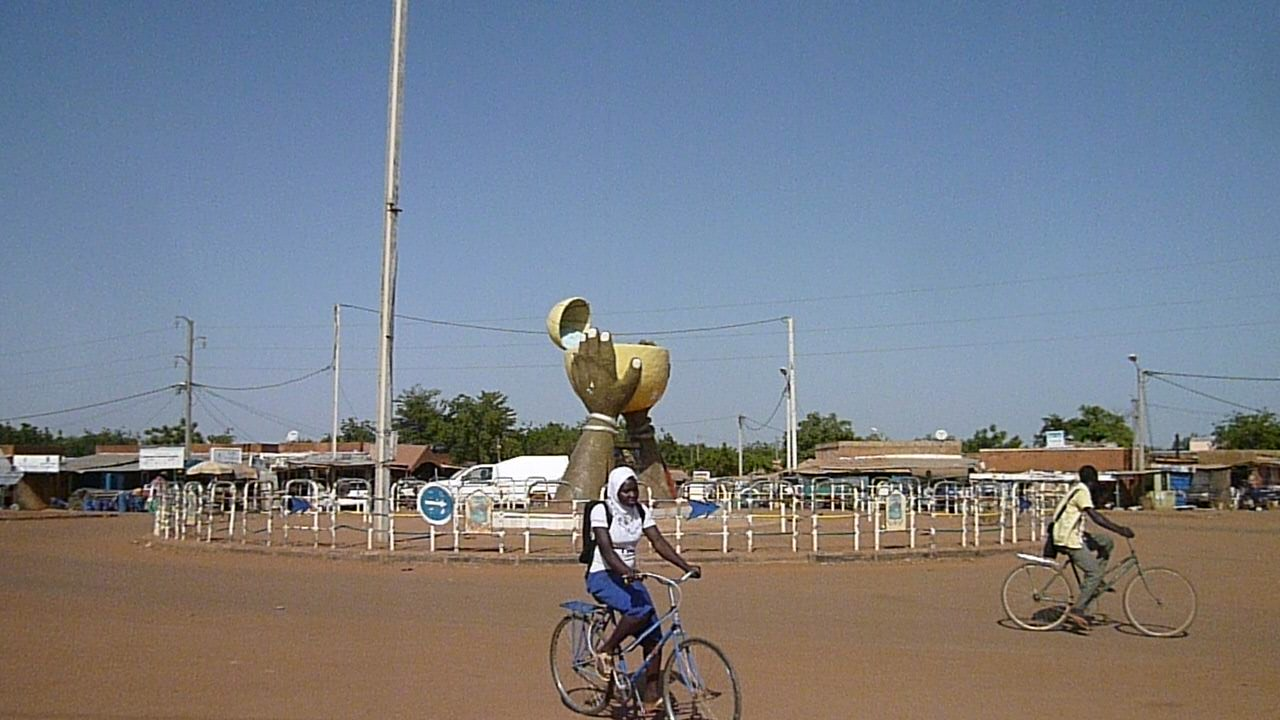
A roundabout in Kongoussi, 2016

Kongoussi has deep roots in Mossi history and social relations - certain small Mossi chiefdoms were located in this area (for example at Sabce), although not based in the town itself. Kongoussi benefits from a lakeside location, which is rare in the African Sahel. It therefore received attention from French administrators and before that from the Catholic Church. France had little real impact on the local population but did establish an outpost, promoted cotton production, and built roads. The lake, Lac du Bam is part of the upper reaches of the southward-flowing Volta system, and its presence permits year-round lakeshore cultivation in an otherwise arid climate. Townspeople have irrigated plots close to the lake shore, but the presence of standing water means the malaria risk is high. Aside from tropical fruits, green beans are produced here, usually supplying the winter market in Paris when flights form Ouagadougou permit this. There is a major road in Kongoussi that runs north to Bourzanga and beyond, and a paved road from the center of town down to the capital city of Ouagadougou, which lies 125 kilometres (78 mi) to the south. There are dirt roads and tracks connecting to outlying villages, and on an east–west axis.

Kongoussi has lagged behind nearby towns (like Kaya) in terms of its economic development and infrastructure. While government buildings house the regional outposts of several ministries and organisations (their employees have regular salaries) the majority of the urban population run small businesses or are traders. Kongoussi is in many respects typical of provincial Burkina Faso: limited electricity and piped water supply, dusty dirt roads, and many market stalls and small businesses supplying the townspeople and the rural hinterland. It has a small hospital, a large Catholic mission on the eastern shores of the Lac du Bam, a small number of rudimentary hotels, primary and secondary schools, a cinema and a large market. Access to internet became possible in about 2000, and there is mobile phone service. A few bars, hotels and the cinema provide the nightlife.

In the late 1980s, after devastating droughts began to wane, the town started to attract interest from international development organisations, the largest of which was PATECORE, funded by the German aid agency GTZ and concentrating on soil conservation in 240 outlying villages. Plan International also has an office there Kongoussi is well enough connected to Ouagadougou to have a good level of contact with the aid sector.

Population
Year	Pop.	±%
1985	6,578	—
2006	25,172	+282.7%
2019	53,627	+113.0%
