= Bam Province =

Coordinates: 13°19′32″N 1°31′40″W

Bam
- Province
- Location in Burkina Faso

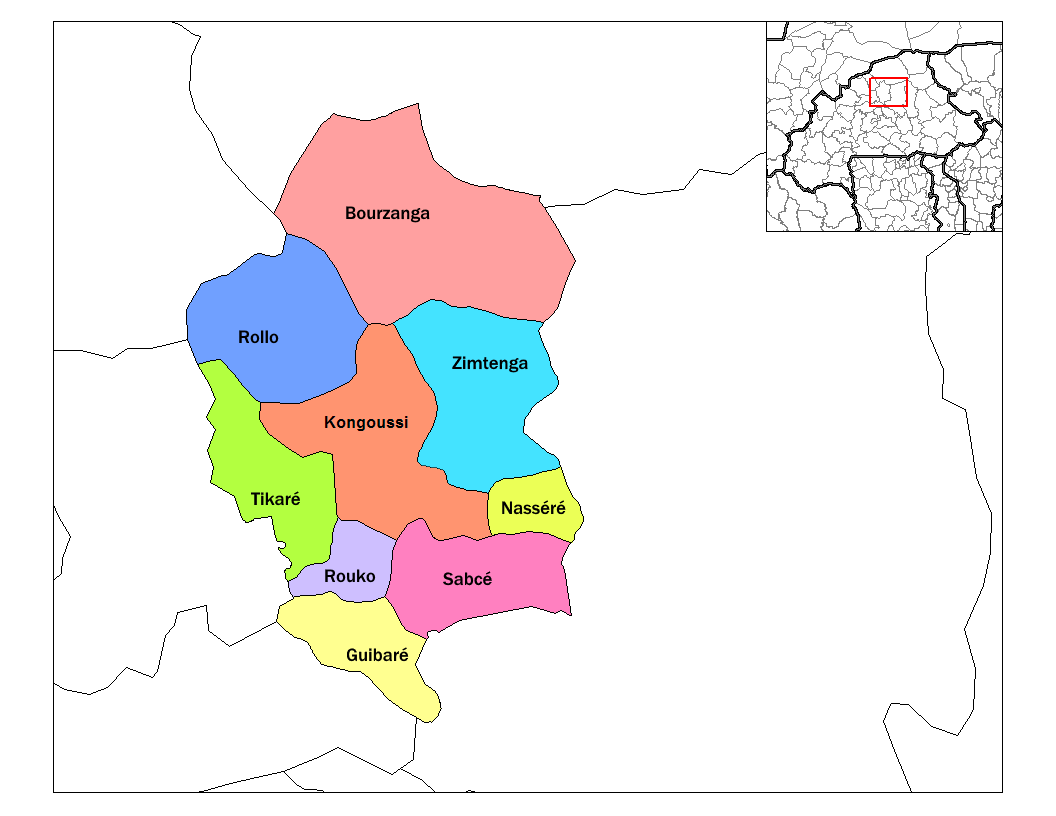
- Provincial map of its departments
- Country: Burkina Faso
- Region: Centre-Nord Region
- Capital: Kongoussi

Area
  - Province: 4,084 km^{2} (1,577 sq mi)

Population (2019 census)
  - Province: 473,955
  - Density: 116.1/km^{2} (300.6/sq mi)
  - Urban: 53,627
- Time zone: UTC+0 (GMT 0)

Bam is one of the 45 provinces of Burkina Faso. It is located in Centre-Nord Region and the capital of Bam is Kongoussi. In 2019 it has a population of 473,955. It is a rural province with 420,314 of its residents living in the countryside; only 53,641 live in urban areas. There are 229,786 men living in Bam Province and 244,169 women.

Bam is divided into 9 departments:

The Departments of Bam
Departments	Capital city	Population (Census 2006)
Bourzanga Department	Bourzanga	48,545
Guibaré Department	Guibaré	23,830
Kongoussi Department	Kongoussi	68,807
Nasséré Department	Nasséré	10,507
Rollo Department	Rollo	26,722
Rouko Department	Rouko	13,651
Sabcé Department	Sabcé	23,668
Tikaré Department	Tikaré	37,702
Zimtenga Department	Zimtenga	23,660

== Twin towns ==
- Kongoussi is twinned with:
  - Canteleu, Seine-Maritime, France
  - Landerneau, Finistère, France

== See also ==
- Regions of Burkina Faso
- Provinces of Burkina Faso
- Communes of Burkina Faso
