= Kuilsé Region =

Region of Burkina Faso

Kuilsé Koulsé
- Region
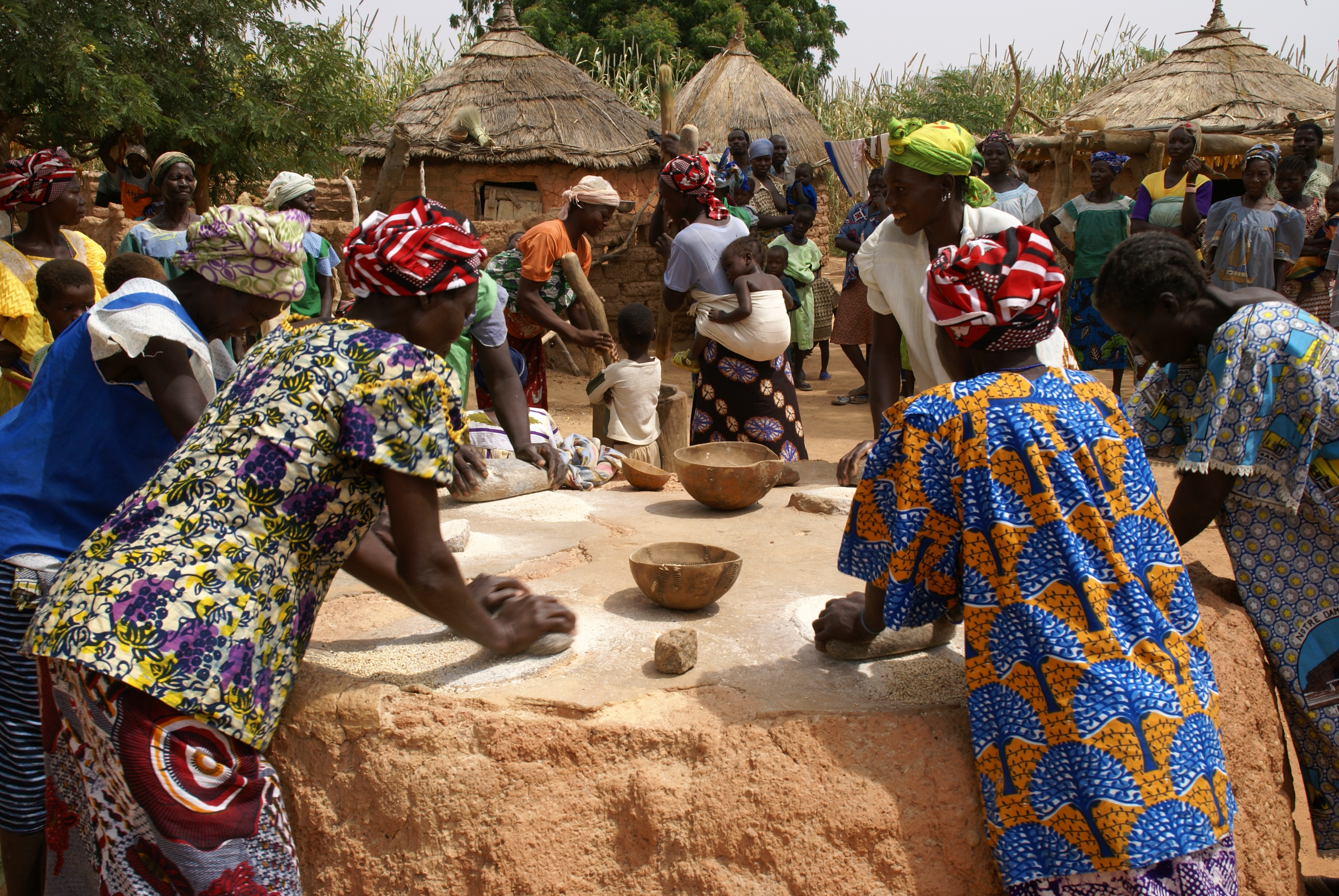

- Location in Burkina Faso
- Coordinates: 13°15′N 1°0′W
- Country: Burkina Faso
- Capital: Kaya

Area
  - Region: 7,656 sq mi (19,829 km^{2})

Population (2019 census)
  - Region: 1,872,126
  - Density: 244.53/sq mi (94.414/km^{2})
  - Urban: 200,787
- Time zone: UTC+0 (GMT 0)
- HDI (2017): 0.383 low · 10th

Kuilsé, sometimes rendered as Koulsé and formerly known as Centre-Nord ([sɑ̃tʁ.nɔʁ], "North Central"), is one of 17 administrative regions of Burkina Faso, a landlocked country in Africa. The population of Kuilsé in 2019 was 1,872,126. The region's capital is Kaya. Three provinces—Bam, Namentenga, and Sanmatenga—make up the region.

As of 2019, the population of the region was 1,872,126 with 52.6% females. The population in the region was 9.13% of the total population of the country. The child mortality rate was 55, infant mortality rate was 64 and the mortality of children under five was 116. As of 2007, the literacy rate in the region was 16.6%, compared to a national average of 28.3%. The coverage of cereal need compared to the total production of the region was 70.00%.

== Geography ==
Most of Burkina Faso is a wide plateau formed by riverine systems and is called falaise de Banfora. There are three major rivers, the Red Volta, Black Volta and White Volta, which cuts through different valleys. The climate is generally hot, with unreliable rains across different seasons. Gold and quartz are common minerals found across the country, while manganese deposits are also common. The dry season is usually from October to May, and rains are common during the wet season from June to September. The soil texture is porous and hence the yield is also poor. The average elevation is around 200 m (660 ft) to 300 m (980 ft) above mean sea level. Among West African countries, Burkina Faso has the largest elephant population, and the country is replete with game reserves. The northern regions are generally arid and usually have scrub land and semi-deserts. The principal river is the Red Volta, that originates in the northern region and drains into Ghana. The areas near the rivers usually have flies like tsetse and similium, which are carriers of sleep sickness and river blindness. The average rainfall in the region is around 25 cm (9.8 in) compared to southern regions that receive only 100 cm (39 in) rainfall.

== Demographics ==
Historical population
Year	Pop.	±% p.a.
1985	730,149	—
1996	928,321	+2.21%
2006	1,202,025	+2.62%
2019	1,872,126	+3.47%

As of 2019, the population of the region was 1,872,126 with 52.6% females. The population in the region was 9.13% of the total population of the country. The child mortality rate was 55, infant mortality rate was 64 and the mortality of children under five was 116. As of 2007, among the working population, there were 70% employees, 22% under employed, 7.2% inactive people, 7.9% not working and 0.7% unemployed people in the region. As of 2007, the literacy rate in the region was 16.6%, compared to a national average of 28.3%. The gross primary enrolment was 64.8%, pos-primary was 18% and gross secondary school enrolment was 4.4. There were 118 boys and 112 girls enrolled in the primary and post-secondary level. There were 17 teachers in primary & post-secondary level, while there were 500 teachers in post-primary and post-secondary level.

== Economy ==
As of 2007, there were 476.3 km (296.0 mi) of highways, 301.4 km (187.3 mi) of regional roads and 383 km (238 mi) of county roads. The first set of car traffic was 20, first set of two-wheeler traffic was 3,605 and the total classified road network was 1,161. The total corn produced during 2015 was 10,053 tonnes, cotton was 041 tonnes, cowpea was 63,787 tonnes, ground nut was 15,474 tonnes, millet was 69,722 tonnes, rice was 9,746 tonnes and sorghum was 142,311 tonnes. The coverage of cereal need compared to the total production of the region was 70.00 per cent.

== Local Administration ==
Province	Capital	2006
Bam Province	Kongoussi	277,092
Namentenga Province	Boulsa	327,749
Sanmatenga Province	Kaya	598,232

Burkina Faso gained independence from France in 1960. It was originally called Upper Volta. There have been military coups until 1983 when Captain Thomas Sankara took control and implemented radical left-wing policies. He was ousted by Blaise Compaore, who continued for 27 years until 2014, when a popular uprising ended his rule. As per Law No.40/98/AN in 1998, Burkina Faso adhered to decentralization to provide administrative and financial autonomy to local communities. There are 13 administrative regions, each governed by a Governor. The regions are subdivided into 45 provinces, which are further subdivided into 351 communes. The communes may be urban or rural and are interchangeable. There are other administrative entities like department and village. An urban commune has typically 10,000 people under it. If any commune is not able to get 75 per cent of its planned budget in revenues for 3 years, the autonomy is taken off. The communes are administered by elected Mayors. The communes are stipulated to develop economic, social and cultural values of its citizens. A commune has financial autonomy and can interact with other communes, government agencies or international entities.
