= Alga (disambiguation) =

An alga (plural algae) is a type of photosynthetic organism.

Alga may also refer to:

== Places ==
=== Burkina Faso ===
- Alga, Burkina Faso
- Alga-Fulbé

=== Italy ===
- San Giorgio in Alga, an island of the Venetian lagoon, northern Italy

=== Kazakhstan ===
- Alga District
- Alga, Kazakhstan, a town in the Alga District; one of a number of communities in Kazakhstan with this name

=== Kyrgyzstan ===
- Alga, Kadamjay, Kadamjay District, Batken Region
- Alga, Leylek, Leylek District, Batken Region
- Alga, Chüy, Chüy District, Chüy Region
- Alga, Osh, Özgön District, Osh Region

== Other uses ==
- AlGa, an aluminium-gallium alloy
- Alga, a board game publisher based in Sweden
- Alga, a synonym for the genus Zostera

== See also ==
- Algae (disambiguation)
- Algal
