= Napho (disambiguation) =

Napho may refer to:

- Bia (butterfly), a Neotropical genus of butterflies, also known as Napho
  - Bia actorion (Napho actoriaena), a species
- Ban Napho, village in Sainyabuli Province, Laos
- Na Pho District in Buriram Province, Thailand

== See also ==
- Nafo
- Napo (disambiguation)
