= FC Sheriff Tiraspol in European football =

Overview of the FC Sheriff Tiraspol's role in European football

Sheriff Tiraspol in European football
- Club: Sheriff Tiraspol
- Most appearances: Wilfried Balima (66)
- Top scorer: Ziguy Badibanga (8)
- First entry: 1999–2000 UEFA Cup
- Latest entry: 2026–27 UEFA Europa League

Football Club Sheriff Tiraspol is a Moldovan football club based in Tiraspol, a city located in the unrecognised breakaway state of Transnistria.

== History ==
Sheriff Tiraspol first qualified for European competition in 1999, after finishing fourth in the League, entering in to the 1999–2000 UEFA Cup, where they were knocked out on away goals by Sigma Olomouc after a 1–1 draw at home, and a goalless draw in Olomouc.

=== 2021–22 season ===
During the 2021–22 season, Sheriff became the first Moldovan team to qualify for the group stages of the UEFA Champions League after a 3–0 aggregate win over Dinamo Zagreb. They were drawn into Group D to face Inter Milan, Real Madrid and Shakhtar Donetsk. On 15 September, Sheriff won their opening group game, 2–0 against Shakhtar Donetsk, before following it up with an upset 2–1 away victory over Real Madrid at the Santiago Bernabéu on 28 September 2021, with Sébastien Thill scoring the winning goal in the 89th minute.

=== European matches ===
As of match played 13 August 2026

Season	Competition	Round	Opponents	Home	Away	Aggregate
1999–2000	UEFA Cup	QR	(Czech Republic) Sigma Olomouc	1–1	0–0	1–1 (a)
2000–01	UEFA Cup	QR	(Slovenia) Olimpija Ljubljana	0–0	0–3	0–3
2001–02	UEFA Champions League	1QR	(Armenia) Araks Ararat	2–0	1–0	3–0
2001–02	UEFA Champions League	2QR	(Belgium) Anderlecht	1–2	0–4	1–6
2002–03	UEFA Champions League	1QR	(Kazakhstan) Astana	2–1	2–3	4–4 (a)
2002–03	UEFA Champions League	2QR	(Austria) Grazer AK	1–4	0–2	1–6
2003–04	UEFA Champions League	1QR	(Estonia) Flora Tallinn	1–0	1–1	2–1
2003–04	UEFA Champions League	2QR	(Ukraine) Shakhtar Donetsk	0–0	0–2	0–2
2004–05	UEFA Champions League	1QR	(Luxembourg) Jeunesse Esch	2–0	0–1	2–1
2004–05	UEFA Champions League	2QR	(Norway) Rosenborg	0–2	1–2	1–4
2005–06	UEFA Champions League	1QR	(Malta) Sliema Wanderers	2–0	4–1	6–1
2005–06	UEFA Champions League	2QR	(Serbia and Montenegro) Partizan	0–1	0–1	0–2
2006–07	UEFA Champions League	1QR	(Armenia) Pyunik	2–0	0–0	2–0
2006–07	UEFA Champions League	2QR	(Russia) Spartak Moscow	1–1	0–0	1–1 (a)
2007–08	UEFA Champions League	1QR	(Andorra) Rànger's	2–0	3–0	5–0
2007–08	UEFA Champions League	2QR	(Turkey) Beşiktaş	0–3	0–1	0–4
2008–09	UEFA Champions League	1QR	(Kazakhstan) Aktobe	4–0	0–1	4–1
2008–09	UEFA Champions League	2QR	(Czech Republic) Sparta Prague	0–1	0–2	0–3
2009–10	UEFA Champions League	2QR	(Finland) Inter Turku	1–0	1–0	2–0
2009–10	UEFA Champions League	3QR	(Czech Republic) Slavia Prague	0–0	1–1	1–1 (a)
2009–10	UEFA Champions League	PO	(Greece) Olympiacos	0–2	0–1	0–3
2009–10	UEFA Europa League	Group H	(Romania) Steaua București	1–1	0–0	3rd
2009–10	UEFA Europa League	Group H	(Turkey) Fenerbahçe	0–1	0–1	3rd
2009–10	UEFA Europa League	Group H	(Netherlands) Twente	2–0	1–2	3rd
2010–11	UEFA Champions League	2QR	(Albania) Dinamo Tirana	3–1	0–1	3–2
2010–11	UEFA Champions League	3QR	(Croatia) Dinamo Zagreb	1–1	1–1 (a.e.t.)	2–2 (6–5 p)
2010–11	UEFA Champions League	PO	(Switzerland) Basel	0–3	0–1	0–4
2010–11	UEFA Europa League	Group E	(Netherlands) AZ	1–1	1–2	4th
2010–11	UEFA Europa League	Group E	(Ukraine) Dynamo Kyiv	2–0	0–0	4th
2010–11	UEFA Europa League	Group E	(Belarus) BATE Borisov	0–1	1–3	4th
2011–12	UEFA Europa League	2QR	(Bosnia and Herzegovina) Željezničar Sarajevo	0–0	0–1	0–1
2012–13	UEFA Champions League	2QR	(Armenia) Ulisses	1–0	1–0	2–0
2012–13	UEFA Champions League	3QR	(Croatia) Dinamo Zagreb	0–1	0–4	0–5
2012–13	UEFA Europa League	PO	(France) Marseille	1–2	0–0	1–2
2013–14	UEFA Champions League	2QR	(Montenegro) Sutjeska Nikšić	1–1	5–0	6–1
2013–14	UEFA Champions League	3QR	(Croatia) Dinamo Zagreb	0–3	0–1	0–4
2013–14	UEFA Europa League	PO	(Serbia) Vojvodina	2–1	1–1	3–2
2013–14	UEFA Europa League	Group K	(England) Tottenham Hotspur	0–2	1–2	3rd
2013–14	UEFA Europa League	Group K	(Russia) Anzhi Makhachkala	0–0	1–1	3rd
2013–14	UEFA Europa League	Group K	(Norway) Tromsø	2–0	1–1	3rd
2014–15	UEFA Champions League	2QR	(Montenegro) Sutjeska Nikšić	2–0	3–0	5–0
2014–15	UEFA Champions League	3QR	(Slovakia) Slovan Bratislava	0–0	1–2	1–2
2014–15	UEFA Europa League	PO	(Croatia) Rijeka	0–3	0–1	0–4
2015–16	UEFA Europa League	1QR	(Norway) Odd	0–3	0–0	0–3
2016–17	UEFA Champions League	2QR	(Israel) Hapoel Be'er Sheva	0–0	2–3	2–3
2017–18	UEFA Champions League	2QR	(Albania) Kukësi	1–0	1–2	2–2 (a)
2017–18	UEFA Champions League	3QR	(Azerbaijan) Qarabağ	1–2	0–0	1–2
2017–18	UEFA Europa League	PO	(Poland) Legia Warsaw	0–0	1–1	1–1 (a)
2017–18	UEFA Europa League	Group F	(Denmark) Copenhagen	0–0	0–2	3rd
2017–18	UEFA Europa League	Group F	(Czech Republic) Fastav Zlín	1–0	0–0	3rd
2017–18	UEFA Europa League	Group F	(Russia) Lokomotiv Moscow	1–1	2–1	3rd
2018–19	UEFA Champions League	1QR	(Georgia (country)) Torpedo Kutaisi	3–0	1–2	4–2
2018–19	UEFA Champions League	2QR	(North Macedonia) Shkëndija	0–0	0–1	0–1
2018–19	UEFA Europa League	3QR	(Iceland) Valur	1–0	1–2	2–2 (a)
2018–19	UEFA Europa League	PO	(Azerbaijan) Qarabağ	1–0	0–3	1–3
2019–20	UEFA Champions League	1QR	(Georgia (country)) Saburtalo Tbilisi	0–3	3–1	3−4
2019–20	UEFA Europa League	2QR	(Albania) Partizani	1–1	1–0	2−1
2019–20	UEFA Europa League	3QR	(Sweden) AIK	1–2	1–1	2−3
2020–21	UEFA Champions League	1QR	(Luxembourg) Fola Esch	2–0	—N/a	—N/a
2020–21	UEFA Champions League	2QR	(Azerbaijan) Qarabağ	—N/a	1–2	—N/a
2020–21	UEFA Europa League	3QR	(Republic of Ireland) Dundalk	1–1 (3–5 p)	—N/a	—N/a
2021–22	UEFA Champions League	1QR	(Albania) Teuta	1–0	4–0	5–0
2021–22	UEFA Champions League	2QR	(Armenia) Alashkert	3–1	1–0	4–1
2021–22	UEFA Champions League	3QR	(Serbia) Red Star Belgrade	1–0	1–1	2–1
2021–22	UEFA Champions League	PO	(Croatia) Dinamo Zagreb	3–0	0–0	3–0
2021–22	UEFA Champions League	Group D	(Ukraine) Shakhtar Donetsk	2–0	1–1	3rd
2021–22	UEFA Champions League	Group D	(Spain) Real Madrid	0–3	2–1	3rd
2021–22	UEFA Champions League	Group D	(Italy) Inter Milan	1–3	1–3	3rd
2021–22	UEFA Europa League	KPO	(Portugal) Braga	2–0	0–2 (a.e.t.)	2–2 (2–3 p)
2022–23	UEFA Champions League	1QR	(Bosnia and Herzegovina) Zrinjski Mostar	1–0	0–0	1−0
2022–23	UEFA Champions League	2QR	(Slovenia) Maribor	1–0	0–0	1−0
2022–23	UEFA Champions League	3QR	(Czech Republic) Viktoria Plzeň	1–2	1–2	2–4
2022–23	UEFA Europa League	PO	(Armenia) Pyunik	0–0 (a.e.t.)	0–0	0–0 (3–2 p)
2022–23	UEFA Europa League	Group E	(England) Manchester United	0–2	0–3	3rd
2022–23	UEFA Europa League	Group E	(Spain) Real Sociedad	0–2	0–3	3rd
2022–23	UEFA Europa League	Group E	(Cyprus) Omonia	1–0	3–0	3rd
2022–23	UEFA Europa Conference League	KPO	(Serbia) Partizan	0–1	3–1	3−2
2022–23	UEFA Europa Conference League	R16	(France) Nice	0–1	1–3	1–4
2023–24	UEFA Champions League	1QR	(Romania) Farul Constanța	3–0 (a.e.t.)	0–1	3–1
2023–24	UEFA Champions League	2QR	(Israel) Maccabi Haifa	1–0	1–4 (a.e.t.)	2–4
2023–24	UEFA Europa League	3QR	(Belarus) BATE Borisov	5–1	2–2	7–3
2023–24	UEFA Europa League	PO	(Faroe Islands) KÍ Klaksvík	2–1	1–1	3–2
2023–24	UEFA Europa League	Group G	(Italy) Roma	1–2	0–3	4th
2023–24	UEFA Europa League	Group G	(Czech Republic) Slavia Prague	2–3	0–6	4th
2023–24	UEFA Europa League	Group G	(Switzerland) Servette	1–1	1–2	4th
2024–25	UEFA Europa League	1QR	(Azerbaijan) Zira	0–1	2–1 (a.e.t.)	2–2 (5–4 p)
2024–25	UEFA Europa League	2QR	(Sweden) Elfsborg	0–1	0–2	0–3
2024–25	UEFA Conference League	3QR	(Slovenia) Olimpija Ljubljana	0–1	0–3	0–4
2025–26	UEFA Europa League	1QR	(Kosovo) Prishtina	4–0	1–2	5–2
2025–26	UEFA Europa League	2QR	(Netherlands) Utrecht	1–3	1–4	2–7
2025–26	UEFA Conference League	3QR	(Belgium) Anderlecht	1–1	0–3	1–4
2026–27	UEFA Europa League	1QR	(Slovenia) Aluminij	0–0	1–0	1–0
2026–27	UEFA Europa League	2QR	(Israel) Maccabi Tel Aviv	0–5	0–1	0–6
2026–27	UEFA Conference League	3QR	(Switzerland) St. Gallen	1–3	1–5	2–8

== Player statistics ==
=== Appearances ===
As of match played 14 August 2025

Rank	Position	Player	Years	UEFA Cup	UEFA Europa League	UEFA Champions League	UEFA Conference League	Total
1	DF	(Burkina Faso) Wilfried Balima	2005–2020	0 (0)	39 (1)	27 (1)	0 (0)	66 (2)
2	DF	(Georgia (country)) Vazha Tarkhnishvili	1999–2012	4 (0)	10 (0)	40 (2)	0 (0)	54 (2)
3	DF	(Brazil) Cristiano	2017; 2018–2022	0 (0)	17 (0)	26 (0)	0 (0)	43 (0)
4	FW	(Moldova) Henrique Luvannor (Note: Luvannor was born in Brazil, and went on to represent Moldova at international level.)	2011–2014; 2021; 2023–2024	0 (0)	19 (1)	19 (6)	0 (0)	38 (7)
5	MF	(Burkina Faso) Cedric Badolo	2022–2024	0 (0)	20 (1)	9 (0)	6 (1)	35 (2)
6	FW	(Brazil) Ricardinho	2013–2015; 2023–2024	0 (0)	20 (2)	12 (2)	0 (0)	32 (4)
7	MF	(Mali) Moussa Kyabou	2021–2025	0 (0)	12 (0)	13 (0)	6 (0)	31 (0)
8	MF	(Burkina Faso) Florent Rouamba	2006–2012	0 (0)	14 (1)	16 (0)	0 (0)	30 (1)
9	DF	(Ivory Coast) Marcel Metoua	2011–2016	0 (0)	15 (0)	14 (0)	0 (0)	29 (0)
10	DF	(Slovenia) Miral Samardžić	2010–2014	0 (0)	16 (0)	12 (1)	0 (0)	28 (1)
11	DF	(Cameroon) Gaby Kiki	2022–2024	0 (0)	16 (0)	6 (0)	4 (0)	26 (0)
12	DF	(Bosnia and Herzegovina) Stjepan Radeljić	2021–2023	0 (0)	9 (0)	12 (0)	4 (0)	25 (0)
13	DF	(Bosnia and Herzegovina) Mateo Sušić	2015–2019	0 (0)	14 (0)	10 (0)	0 (0)	24 (0)
14	FW	(Nigeria) Rasheed Akanbi	2022–2025	0 (0)	12 (2)	6 (2)	5 (0)	23 (4)
15	MF	(Belarus) Aliaksei Kuchuk	2005–2008; 2009–2010	0 (0)	5 (0)	17 (3)	0 (0)	22 (3)
15	DF	(Moldova) Andrei Corneencov	2006–2010	0 (0)	4 (0)	18 (0)	0 (0)	22 (0)
15	MF	(Russia) Aleksandr Yerokhin	2007–2010	0 (0)	11 (2)	11 (2)	0 (0)	22 (4)
15	GK	(Croatia) Zvonimir Mikulić	2017–2018; 2018–2021	0 (0)	13 (0)	9 (0)	0 (0)	22 (0)
15	GK	(Ukraine) Maksym Koval	2022–2024	0 (0)	14 (0)	4 (0)	4 (0)	22 (0)
15	MF	(Nigeria) Peter Ademo	2023–2026	0 (0)	14 (1)	4 (1)	4 (0)	22 (2)
21	DF	(Romania) Constantin Arbănaș	2006–2010	0 (0)	5 (0)	16 (0)	0 (0)	21 (0)
21	FW	(Senegal) Amath Diedhiou	2009–2011	0 (0)	10 (1)	11 (0)	0 (0)	21 (1)
21	DF	(Brazil) Nadson	2007–2011	0 (0)	8 (0)	13 (2)	0 (0)	21 (2)
21	DF	(Moldova) Veaceslav Posmac	2017–2021	0 (0)	13 (1)	8 (0)	0 (0)	21 (1)
21	DF	(Ivory Coast) Armel Zohouri	2022–2024, 2025	0 (0)	13 (0)	4 (0)	4 (0)	21 (1)
26	DF	(Serbia) Vladimir Volkov (Note: Volkov went on to represent Montenegro after leaving Sheriff Tiraspol.)	2009–2011	0 (0)	11 (0)	9 (2)	0 (0)	20 (2)
26	MF	(Moldova) Gheorghe Anton	2017–2019	0 (0)	14 (0)	6 (0)	0 (0)	20 (0)
28	FW	(Belgium) Ziguy Badibanga	2017–2019	0 (0)	11 (4)	8 (4)	0 (0)	19 (8)
28	MF	(Belarus) Yury Kendysh	2017; 2018–2019	0 (0)	13 (1)	6 (0)	0 (0)	19 (1)
28	FW	(Guinea) Momo Yansané	2021–2023	0 (0)	5 (2)	14 (2)	0 (0)	19 (4)
31	GK	(Bulgaria) Vladislav Stoyanov	2010–2012	0 (0)	8 (0)	10 (0)	0 (0)	18 (0)
31	FW	(Bulgaria) Ismail Isa	2013–2015	0 (0)	10 (4)	8 (2)	0 (0)	18 (6)
31	MF	(Brazil) Cadú	2013–2016	0 (0)	10 (1)	8 (1)	0 (0)	18 (2)
31	MF	(Cape Verde) João Paulo Fernandes	2023–2025	0 (0)	12 (0)	4 (0)	2 (0)	18 (0)
35	MF	(Ghana) Patrick Kpozo	2022–2023	0 (0)	8 (0)	6 (0)	3 (0)	17 (0)
35	DF	(Zimbabwe) Munashe Garananga	2023	0 (0)	9 (0)	4 (0)	4 (0)	17 (0)
37	GK	(Romania) Sebastian Huțan	2002–2006	0 (0)	0 (0)	16 (0)	0 (0)	16 (0)
37	GK	(Moldova) Stanislav Namașco	2008–2010	0 (0)	6 (0)	10 (0)	0 (0)	16 (0)
37	MF	(Luxembourg) Sébastien Thill	2021–2022	0 (0)	2 (1)	14 (3)	0 (0)	16 (4)
37	FW	(Mali) Adama Traoré	2021–2022	0 (0)	2 (1)	14 (6)	0 (0)	16 (7)
41	MF	(Moldova) Alexandru Suvorov	2002–2010	0 (0)	2 (0)	13 (3)	0 (0)	15 (3)
41	FW	(Brazil) Jymmy França	2009–2011	0 (0)	9 (2)	6 (0)	0 (0)	15 (2)
41	MF	(Moldova) Stanislav Ivanov	1997–2004; 2012–2013	4 (0)	2 (0)	9 (0)	0 (0)	15 (0)
41	FW	(Colombia) Frank Castañeda	2020–2021	0 (0)	1 (0)	14 (3)	0 (0)	15 (3)
41	DF	(Peru) Gustavo Dulanto	2021–2022	0 (0)	1 (0)	14 (1)	0 (0)	15 (1)
41	GK	(Greece) Giorgos Athanasiadis	2021–2022	0 (0)	2 (0)	13 (0)	0 (0)	15 (0)
41	DF	(Trinidad and Tobago) Keston Julien	2020–2023	0 (0)	2 (0)	13 (0)	0 (0)	15 (0)
41	MF	(Cameroon) Jerome Ngom Mbekeli	2023–2024	0 (0)	9 (2)	4 (1)	2 (0)	15 (3)
49	MF	(Moldova) Victor Barîșev	1999–2000; 2003–2004	2 (0)	0 (0)	12 (0)	0 (0)	14 (0)
49	MF	(Ukraine) Oleh Humenyuk	2001–2007	0 (0)	0 (0)	14 (1)	0 (0)	14 (1)
49	DF	(Togo) Abdoul-Gafar Mamah	2005–2010	0 (0)	4 (0)	10 (0)	0 (0)	14 (0)
49	MF	(Serbia) Marko Stanojević	2012–2015	0 (0)	6 (0)	8 (0)	0 (0)	14 (0)
49	MF	(Croatia) Josip Brezovec	2016–2018	0 (0)	8 (1)	6 (1)	0 (0)	14 (2)
49	DF	(Colombia) Danilo Arboleda	2021	0 (0)	0 (0)	14 (1)	0 (0)	14 (1)
49	DF	(Brazil) Renan Guedes	2022–2023	0 (0)	6 (0)	6 (0)	2 (0)	14 (0)
49	FW	(Burkina Faso) Abou Ouattara	2022–2024	0 (0)	8 (0)	6 (0)	0 (0)	14 (0)
57	MF	(Argentina) Luis Antonio Rodríguez	2008–2010	0 (0)	5 (0)	8 (0)	0 (0)	13 (0)
57	DF	(Serbia) Vladimir Branković	2009–2011	0 (0)	7 (0)	6 (0)	0 (0)	13 (0)
57	DF	(Moldova) Petru Racu	2017–2018	0 (0)	9 (0)	4 (0)	0 (0)	13 (0)
57	DF	(Croatia) Ante Kulušić	2017–2019	0 (0)	10 (0)	3 (0)	0 (0)	13 (0)
57	MF	(Ghana) Edmund Addo	2021–2023	0 (0)	1 (0)	12 (0)	0 (0)	13 (0)
62	DF	(Moldova) Iurie Priganiuc	2002–2004	0 (0)	0 (0)	12 (2)	0 (0)	12 (2)
62	MF	(Romania) George Florescu	2004–2006	0 (0)	0 (0)	12 (1)	0 (0)	12 (1)
62	MF	(Serbia) Miloš Adamović	2010–2011	0 (0)	6 (0)	6 (0)	0 (0)	12 (0)
62	DF	(Guinea) Djibril Paye	2008–2014	0 (0)	8 (0)	4 (0)	0 (0)	12 (0)
62	FW	(Brazil) Pernambuco	2022	0 (0)	6 (0)	6 (0)	0 (0)	12 (0)
62	MF	(Senegal) Mouhamed Diop	2022–2023	0 (0)	8 (1)	0 (0)	4 (2)	12 (3)
62	MF	(Morocco) Amine Talal	2023–2024	0 (0)	5 (0)	4 (3)	3 (0)	12 (3)
62	MF	(Greece) Konstantinos Apostolakis	2023–2024	0 (0)	8 (0)	4 (0)	0 (0)	12 (0)
62	MF	(Colombia) Cristian Tovar	2023–2024	0 (0)	8 (2)	4 (0)	0 (0)	12 (2)
71	DF	(Nigeria) Chidi Odiah	2000–2004	0 (0)	0 (0)	11 (0)	0 (0)	11 (0)
71	MF	(Romania) Răzvan Cociș	2004–2006	0 (0)	0 (0)	11 (3)	0 (0)	11 (3)
71	MF	(Greece) Dimitris Kolovos	2020–2022	0 (0)	1 (0)	10 (1)	0 (0)	11 (1)
71	FW	(Nigeria) Iyayi Atiemwen	2022–2023	0 (0)	7 (1)	1 (0)	3 (0)	11 (1)
71	FW	(Nigeria) David Ankeye	2023–2024	0 (0)	9 (3)	2 (0)	0 (0)	11 (3)
71	DF	(Ghana) Kwame Boakye	2024–2025	0 (0)	7 (0)	0 (0)	4 (0)	11 (0)
77	FW	(Moldova) Evgheni Pațula	1999–2003	2 (0)	0 (0)	8 (0)	0 (0)	10 (0)
77	MF	(Moldova) Vadim Boreț	2001–2002	0 (0)	0 (0)	10 (2)	0 (0)	10 (2)
77	FW	(Ukraine) Andriy Nesteruk	1999–2000; 2002–2004	0 (0)	0 (0)	10 (2)	0 (0)	10 (2)
77	DF	(Romania) Florian Dan Lăcustă	1998–1999; 2003–2005; 2006	0 (0)	0 (0)	10 (0)	0 (0)	10 (0)
77	DF	(Moldova) Ion Testemițanu	2002–2004; 2004–2005; 2005–2006; 2007–2009	0 (0)	0 (0)	10 (0)	0 (0)	10 (0)
77	DF	(Bosnia and Herzegovina) Ognjen Vranješ	2010	0 (0)	4 (0)	6 (0)	0 (0)	10 (0)
77	GK	(Croatia) Vjekoslav Tomić	2013–2014	0 (0)	8 (0)	2 (0)	0 (0)	10 (0)
77	MF	(Curaçao) Jeremy de Nooijer (Note: de Nooijer was born in the Netherlands, and went on to represent Curaçao at international level.)	2017–2019	0 (0)	7 (0)	3 (0)	0 (0)	10 (0)
77	MF	(Moldova) Alexandru Pașcenco	2012–2006; 2012–2013	0 (0)	5 (0)	5 (0)	0 (0)	10 (0)
77	DF	(Albania) Alesio Mija	2024–Present	0 (0)	8 (0)	0 (0)	2 (0)	10 (0)
77	MF	(Burkina Faso) Cyrille Bayala	2016–2017, 2024–2026	0 (0)	4 (4)	4 (1)	2 (0)	10 (5)
88	MF	(Moldova) Victor Comleonoc	2001–2004	0 (0)	0 (0)	9 (1)	0 (0)	9 (1)
88	MF	(Brazil) Fred	2008–2009; 2010–2011	0 (0)	3 (0)	6 (0)	0 (0)	9 (0)
88	FW	(Moldova) Sergiu Dadu	1999–2004; 2006; 2012–2013	0 (0)	1 (0)	8 (1)	0 (0)	9 (1)
88	MF	(Moldova) Serghei Gheorghiev	2008–2013; 2014–2015; 2015–2016	0 (0)	3 (0)	6 (1)	0 (0)	9 (1)
88	MF	(Brazil) Fernando Gomes	2013–2014	0 (0)	5 (1)	4 (2)	0 (0)	9 (3)
88	FW	(Moldova) Vitalie Damașcan	2017–2018; 2018	0 (0)	6 (0)	3 (0)	0 (0)	9 (0)
88	GK	(Moldova) Serghei Pașcenco	2002; 2004–2007; 2014–2015; 2018–2024	0 (0)	4 (0)	5 (0)	0 (0)	9 (0)
88	MF	(Bosnia and Herzegovina) Rifet Kapić	2018; 2020–2021	0 (0)	5 (1)	4 (0)	0 (0)	9 (1)
88	MF	(Croatia) Antun Palić	2018–2020	0 (0)	3 (0)	6 (0)	0 (0)	9 (0)
88	DF	(Brazil) Fernando Costanza	2021–2022	0 (0)	0 (0)	9 (0)	0 (0)	9 (0)
88	FW	(Ghana) Salifu Mudasiru	2022–2023	0 (0)	8 (0)	1 (0)	0 (0)	9 (0)
88	DF	(Colombia) Alejandro Artunduaga	2023–2024	0 (0)	9 (0)	0 (0)	0 (0)	9 (0)
88	FW	(Mauritania) Pape Ndiaga Yade	2024–Present	0 (0)	6 (1)	0 (0)	3 (0)	9 (1)
101	MF	(Panama) Alberto Blanco	2001–2005	0 (0)	0 (0)	8 (0)	0 (0)	8 (0)
101	DF	(Moldova) Alexandru Epureanu	2004–2006	0 (0)	0 (0)	8 (2)	0 (0)	8 (2)
101	DF	(Brazil) Sérgio	2008–2010	0 (0)	3 (0)	5 (0)	0 (0)	8 (0)
101	FW	(Serbia) Aleksandar Pešić	2011–2013	0 (0)	2 (0)	6 (0)	0 (0)	8 (0)
101	MF	(Israel) Kobi Moyal	2013–2014	0 (0)	8 (0)	0 (0)	0 (0)	8 (0)
101	MF	(Moldova) Radu Gînsari	2014–2017	0 (0)	2 (0)	6 (0)	0 (0)	8 (0)
101	FW	(Montenegro) Stefan Mugoša	2017	0 (0)	4 (0)	4 (0)	0 (0)	8 (0)
101	FW	(Brazil) Jairo	2017–2018	0 (0)	8 (1)	0 (0)	0 (0)	8 (1)
101	FW	(Sierra Leone) Alhaji Kamara	2018–2019	0 (0)	4 (0)	4 (0)	0 (0)	8 (0)
101	FW	(Brazil) Jô Santos	2016–2018	0 (0)	4 (0)	4 (2)	0 (0)	8 (2)
101	FW	(Croatia) Gabrijel Boban	2019–2021	0 (0)	4 (1)	4 (0)	0 (0)	8 (1)
101	DF	(Malawi) Charles Petro	2020–2022	0 (0)	3 (0)	5 (0)	0 (0)	8 (0)
101	MF	(Brazil) Bruno	2021–2022	0 (0)	2 (0)	6 (0)	0 (0)	8 (0)
101	GK	(Moldova) Dumitru Celeadnic	2020–2023, 2023–2024	0 (0)	4 (0)	3 (0)	1 (0)	8 (0)
115	FW	(Moldova) Ruslan Barburoș	1998–1999; 2000; 2001–2002	0 (0)	0 (0)	7 (1)	0 (0)	7 (1)
115	FW	(Romania) Cristian Tudor	2001–2003	0 (0)	0 (0)	7 (1)	0 (0)	7 (1)
115	DF	(Burkina Faso) Ibrahim Gnanou	2005–2007	0 (0)	0 (0)	7 (0)	0 (0)	7 (0)
115	MF	(Moldova) Vitalie Bulat	2003–2011	0 (0)	2 (0)	5 (0)	0 (0)	7 (0)
115	DF	(Brazil) Willian Thuram	2013	0 (0)	3 (0)	4 (0)	0 (0)	7 (0)
115	MF	(Luxembourg) Gerson Rodrigues (Note: Rodrigues was born in the Portugal, and went on to represent Luxembourg at international level.)	2018	0 (0)	3 (0)	4 (0)	0 (0)	7 (0)
115	DF	(Senegal) Ousmane N'Diaye	2019–2020	0 (0)	4 (1)	3 (0)	0 (0)	7 (1)
115	FW	(Slovenia) Lovro Bizjak	2021–2022	0 (0)	0 (0)	7 (0)	0 (0)	7 (0)
115	MF	(North Macedonia) Boban Nikolov	2021–2022	0 (0)	2 (0)	5 (1)	0 (0)	7 (1)
124	MF	(Moldova) Vladimir Tanurcov	1998–2002	4 (0)	0 (0)	2 (0)	0 (0)	6 (0)
124	MF	(Montenegro) Baćo Nikolić	2010	0 (0)	2 (0)	4 (1)	0 (0)	6 (1)
124	MF	(Moldova) Alexandru Onica	2012–2013	0 (0)	2 (0)	4 (0)	0 (0)	6 (0)
124	GK	(Moldova) Dmitri Stajila	2009–2016	0 (0)	4 (0)	2 (0)	0 (0)	6 (0)
124	FW	(Brazil) Jhulliam	2013–2014	0 (0)	5 (1)	1 (0)	0 (0)	6 (1)
124	DF	(Brazil) Ernandes	2014–2015	0 (0)	4 (0)	2 (0)	0 (0)	6 (0)
124	FW	(Brazil) Juninho Potiguar	2014–2016	0 (0)	4 (0)	2 (0)	0 (0)	6 (0)
124	GK	(Argentina) Matías Degra	2014–2015	0 (0)	2 (0)	4 (0)	0 (0)	6 (0)
124	DF	(Romania) Andrei Mureșan	2014–2015	0 (0)	2 (0)	4 (1)	0 (0)	6 (1)
124	DF	(Poland) Jarosław Jach	2019	0 (0)	4 (0)	2 (0)	0 (0)	6 (0)
124	FW	(Cameroon) Robert Tambe	2019–2020	0 (0)	4 (1)	2 (1)	0 (0)	6 (2)
124	MF	(Albania) Liridon Latifi (Note: Latifi was born in Kosovo, and went on to represent Albania at international level.)	2019–2020	0 (0)	4 (0)	2 (1)	0 (0)	6 (1)
124	MF	(Ukraine) Artem Hordiyenko	2019	0 (0)	4 (0)	2 (0)	0 (0)	6 (0)
124	GK	(Ghana) Razak Abalora	2022–2023	0 (0)	0 (0)	6 (0)	0 (0)	6 (0)
124	FW	(Netherlands) Kay Tejan	2022	0 (0)	2 (0)	4 (0)	0 (0)	6 (0)
124	MF	(Brazil) Vinícius Paiva	2023–2024	0 (0)	2 (0)	4 (0)	0 (0)	6 (0)
124	DF	(Ivory Coast) Jocelin Behiratche	2024–2025	0 (0)	4 (0)	0 (0)	2 (0)	6 (0)
124	MF	(Morocco) Ayyoub Allach	2024	0 (0)	4 (1)	0 (0)	2 (0)	6 (1)
124	GK	(Bulgaria) Ivan Dyulgerov	2025–Present	0 (0)	4 (0)	0 (0)	2 (0)	6 (0)
124	DF	(Mali) Soumaïla Magossouba	2025–Present	0 (0)	4 (0)	0 (0)	2 (0)	6 (0)
124	DF	(Brazil) Raí	2025–Present	0 (0)	4 (0)	0 (0)	2 (0)	6 (0)
124	MF	(Guinea) Ibrahima Soumah	2025–Present	0 (0)	4 (0)	0 (0)	2 (0)	6 (0)
124	FW	(Mali) Mamady Diarra	2025–2026	0 (0)	4 (0)	0 (0)	2 (0)	6 (0)
124	FW	(Albania) Amarildo Gjoni	2025–2026	0 (0)	4 (0)	0 (0)	2 (0)	6 (0)
148	MF	(Georgia (country)) Roman Goginashvili	2004–2006	0 (0)	0 (0)	5 (0)	0 (0)	5 (0)
148	DF	(Burkina Faso) Ben Idrissa Dermé	2004–2008	0 (0)	0 (0)	5 (1)	0 (0)	5 (1)
148	FW	(Moldova) Serghei Alexeev	2002–2009	0 (0)	0 (0)	5 (1)	0 (0)	5 (1)
148	DF	(Armenia) Artyom Khachaturov (Note: Khachaturov was born in the Moldova, and went on to represent Armenia at international level.)	2009–2014	0 (0)	1 (0)	4 (0)	0 (0)	5 (0)
148	FW	(Latvia) Edgars Gauračs	2010–2011	0 (0)	5 (0)	0 (0)	0 (0)	5 (0)
148	MF	(Moldova) Alexandru Dedov	2011–2013	0 (0)	2 (0)	3 (0)	0 (0)	5 (0)
148	FW	(Brazil) Thiago Galvão	2014–2015	0 (0)	2 (0)	3 (0)	0 (0)	5 (0)
148	DF	(Brazil) Victor Oliveira	2017–2018	0 (0)	2 (0)	3 (0)	0 (0)	5 (0)
148	FW	(Moldova) Alexandru Boiciuc	2018	0 (0)	2 (0)	3 (0)	0 (0)	5 (0)
148	DF	(Serbia) Vladimir Kovačević	2018–2019	0 (0)	2 (0)	3 (0)	0 (0)	5 (0)
148	DF	(Croatia) Mateo Mužek (Note: Mužek was born in the Austria, and went on to represent Croatia at international level.)	2019	0 (0)	4 (0)	1 (0)	0 (0)	5 (0)
148	MF	(Moldova) Maxim Cojocaru	2019–2021	0 (0)	3 (0)	2 (0)	0 (0)	5 (0)
148	MF	(Uzbekistan) Jasurbek Yakhshiboev	2021–2022	0 (0)	2 (0)	3 (1)	0 (0)	5 (1)
148	MF	(Albania) Regi Lushkja	2022	0 (0)	0 (0)	5 (0)	0 (0)	5 (0)
148	GK	(Malta) Rashed Al-Tumi	2024–2025	0 (0)	4 (0)	0 (0)	1 (0)	5 (0)
148	DF	(Brazil) Matheus Lins	2024–2025	0 (0)	4 (0)	0 (0)	1 (0)	5 (0)
148	DF	(Sint Maarten) Ilounga Pata	2024	0 (0)	4 (0)	0 (0)	1 (0)	5 (0)
148	FW	(Armenia) Artur Serobyan	2025	0 (0)	4 (1)	0 (0)	1 (0)	5 (1)
148	FW	(Nigeria) Elijah Odede	2025	0 (0)	3 (2)	0 (0)	2 (1)	5 (3)
148	MF	(Liberia) Natus Jamel Swen	2025–Present	0 (0)	3 (0)	0 (0)	2 (0)	5 (0)
168	DF	(Moldova) Radu Talpa	1998–2001	4 (0)	0 (0)	0 (0)	0 (0)	4 (0)
168	MF	(Georgia (country)) Davit Mujiri	1999–2001	4 (1)	0 (0)	0 (0)	0 (0)	4 (1)
168	MF	(Lithuania) Deimantas Bička	1999–2001	4 (0)	0 (0)	0 (0)	0 (0)	4 (0)
168	MF	(Lithuania) Igoris Stukalinas	1999–2001	4 (0)	0 (0)	0 (0)	0 (0)	4 (0)
168	GK	(Moldova) Olexandr Bokarev	2001–2002	0 (0)	0 (0)	4 (0)	0 (0)	4 (0)
168	DF	(Ukraine) Yuriy Bukel	2000–2001	0 (0)	0 (0)	4 (0)	0 (0)	4 (0)
168	DF	(Ukraine) Dmytro Parkhomenko	2000–2002	2 (0)	0 (0)	2 (0)	0 (0)	4 (0)
168	GK	(Moldova) Alexandru Chirilov	1998–1999; 2001–2003; 2005	0 (0)	0 (0)	4 (0)	0 (0)	4 (0)
168	FW	(Togo) Leandro Farias (Note: Farias was born in Brazil, and went on to represent Togo at international level.)	2003–2006	0 (0)	0 (0)	4 (0)	0 (0)	4 (0)
168	MF	(Georgia (country)) Teimuraz Burnadze	2004–2005	0 (0)	0 (0)	4 (0)	0 (0)	4 (0)
168	FW	(Ukraine) Serhiy Kuznetsov	2004	0 (0)	0 (0)	4 (1)	0 (0)	4 (1)
168	DF	(Burkina Faso) Soumaila Tassembedo	2004–2008	0 (0)	0 (0)	4 (0)	0 (0)	4 (0)
168	DF	(Romania) Cristian Ionescu	2005–2006	0 (0)	0 (0)	4 (0)	0 (0)	4 (0)
168	FW	(Romania) Marian Pârșă	2006–2007	0 (0)	0 (0)	4 (0)	0 (0)	4 (0)
168	FW	(Benin) Razak Omotoyossi (Note: Omotoyossi was born in Nigeria, and went on to represent Benin at international level.)	2006–2007	0 (0)	0 (0)	4 (1)	0 (0)	4 (1)
168	DF	(Belarus) Ihar Karpovich	2007–2010	0 (0)	1 (0)	3 (0)	0 (0)	4 (0)
168	DF	(Brazil) João Pereira	2012–2013	0 (0)	0 (0)	4 (0)	0 (0)	4 (0)
168	DF	(Slovenia) Tadej Apatič	2012–2013	0 (0)	0 (0)	4 (0)	0 (0)	4 (0)
168	MF	(Serbia) Saša Marjanović	2012–2013	0 (0)	0 (0)	4 (0)	0 (0)	4 (0)
168	DF	(Serbia) Tomislav Pajović	2012–2014	0 (0)	2 (1)	2 (0)	0 (0)	4 (1)
168	MF	(Moldova) Valentin Furdui	2013–2014	0 (0)	4 (0)	0 (0)	0 (0)	4 (0)
168	DF	(Brazil) Ligger	2014–2015	0 (0)	2 (0)	2 (0)	0 (0)	4 (0)
168	DF	(Portugal) Joãozinho	2014	0 (0)	2 (0)	2 (0)	0 (0)	4 (0)
168	MF	(Brazil) Leonel Olímpio	2014–2015	0 (0)	2 (0)	2 (0)	0 (0)	4 (0)
168	MF	(Colombia) Elkin Blanco	2014	0 (0)	0 (0)	4 (0)	0 (0)	4 (0)
168	FW	(Netherlands) Fred Benson (Note: Benson was born in Ghana, and went on to represent Netherlands U21.)	2014	0 (0)	0 (0)	4 (1)	0 (0)	4 (1)
168	GK	(Bulgaria) Bozhidar Mitrev	2015–2017	0 (0)	2 (0)	2 (0)	0 (0)	4 (0)
168	DF	(Croatia) Andrej Lukić	2019–2020	0 (0)	2 (0)	2 (1)	0 (0)	4 (1)
168	DF	(Greece) Stefanos Evangelou	2021–2023	0 (0)	1 (0)	3 (0)	0 (0)	4 (0)
168	FW	(Brazil) Felipe Vizeu	2022	0 (0)	4 (0)	0 (0)	0 (0)	4 (0)
168	DF	(Brazil) Heron	2022	0 (0)	4 (0)	0 (0)	0 (0)	4 (0)
168	FW	(Burkina Faso) Abdoul Tapsoba	2023	0 (0)	0 (0)	0 (0)	4 (1)	4 (1)
168	MF	(Moldova) Vadim Paireli	2013–2021, 2024	0 (0)	4 (0)	0 (0)	0 (0)	4 (0)
168	FW	(South Sudan) Ajak Riak	2024	0 (0)	3 (0)	0 (0)	1 (0)	4 (0)
202	FW	(Nigeria) Edward Anyamkyegh	1999–2001	3 (0)	0 (0)	0 (0)	0 (0)	3 (0)
202	MF	(Moldova) Veaceslav Bugneac	2001–2002	0 (0)	0 (0)	3 (0)	0 (0)	3 (0)
202	DF	(Moldova) Igor Kharkovchenko	2000–2002	0 (0)	0 (0)	3 (0	0 (0))	3 (0)
202	DF	(Romania) Sorin Botiș	2002–2003	0 (0)	0 (0)	3 (0)	0 (0)	3 (0)
202	MF	(Moldova) Marius Ciubăncan	2002–2003	0 (0)	0 (0)	3 (0)	0 (0)	3 (0)
202	MF	(Ukraine) Evgeni Shiman	2004–2005	0 (0)	0 (0)	3 (0)	0 (0)	3 (0)
202	MF	(Romania) Viorel Dinu	2005–2006	0 (0)	0 (0)	3 (0)	0 (0)	3 (0)
202	DF	(Brazil) Wallace	2005–2008	0 (0)	0 (0)	3 (0)	0 (0)	3 (0)
202	DF	(Nigeria) Kennedy Chinwo	2007–2009	0 (0)	0 (0)	3 (0)	0 (0)	3 (0)
202	FW	(Moldova) Ionut Radu	2008–2009	0 (0)	0 (0)	3 (0)	0 (0)	3 (0)
202	FW	(Moldova) Igor Picușceac	2001–2003; 2008–2009; 2015	0 (0)	0 (0)	3 (1)	0 (0)	3 (1)
202	DF	(Moldova) Andrei Verbetchi	2009	0 (0)	1 (0)	2 (0)	0 (0)	3 (0)
202	DF	(Ukraine) Rustam Tsynya	2007–2011	0 (0)	2 (0)	1 (0)	0 (0)	3 (0)
202	FW	(Montenegro) Marko Đurović	2010	0 (0)	1 (0)	2 (0)	0 (0)	3 (0)
202	MF	(Russia) Nail Zamaliyev	2011–2013	0 (0)	2 (0)	1 (0)	0 (0)	3 (0)
202	FW	(Moldova) Igor Dima	2010–2016	0 (0)	1 (0)	2 (0)	0 (0)	3 (0)
202	DF	(Spain) Melli	2013–2014	0 (0)	3 (0)	0 (0)	0 (0)	3 (0)
202	MF	(Ghana) Seidu Yahaya	2015–2017	0 (0)	2 (0)	1 (0)	0 (0)	3 (0)
202	DF	(Moldova) Vitalie Bordian	2016–2017	0 (0)	0 (0)	3 (0)	0 (0)	3 (0)
202	MF	(Norway) Zlatko Tripić (Note: Tripić was born in Croatia, and went on to represent Norway U21 at international level.)	2017–2018	0 (0)	3 (0)	0 (0)	0 (0)	3 (0)
202	MF	(Moldova) Evgheni Oancea	2016–2019	0 (0)	1 (0)	2 (0)	0 (0)	3 (0)
202	DF	(Slovenia) Matej Palčič	2019–2020	0 (0)	1 (0)	2 (0)	0 (0)	3 (0)
202	DF	(Nigeria) Faith Obilor	2020	0 (0)	1 (0)	2 (0)	0 (0)	3 (0)
202	MF	(Croatia) Benedik Mioč	2020	0 (0)	1 (0)	2 (0)	0 (0)	3 (0)
202	MF	(Colombia) William Parra	2020	0 (0)	1 (0)	2 (0)	0 (0)	3 (0)
202	DF	(Romania) Andrei Peteleu	2020–2021	0 (0)	1 (0)	2 (0)	0 (0)	3 (0)
202	FW	(Malawi) Peter Banda	2021	0 (0)	0 (0)	3 (0)	0 (0)	3 (0)
202	MF	(Colombia) Hansel Zapata	2021–2022	0 (0)	0 (0)	3 (0)	0 (0)	3 (0)
202	MF	(Ivory Coast) Nadrey Dago	2021	0 (0)	0 (0)	3 (0)	0 (0)	3 (0)
202	DF	(Moldova) Serafim Cojocari	2021–2023	0 (0)	1 (0)	2 (0)	0 (0)	3 (0)
202	FW	(Greece) Giannis Fivos Botos	2022	0 (0)	1 (0)	2 (0)	0 (0)	3 (0)
202	MF	(Moldova) Eugeniu Gliga	2020–2024	0 (0)	1 (0)	0 (0)	2 (0)	3 (0)
202	MF	(Niger) Abdoul Moumouni	2021–2024	0 (0)	0 (0)	0 (0)	3 (0)	3 (0)
202	DF	(Cameroon) Cedric Ngah	2023–2024	0 (0)	0 (0)	3 (0)	0 (0)	3 (0)
202	MF	(Colombia) Didier Bueno	2023–2024	0 (0)	1 (0)	2 (0)	0 (0)	3 (0)
202	MF	(Turkey) Berkay Vardar	2023–2024	0 (0)	3 (0)	0 (0)	0 (0)	3 (0)
202	DF	(Croatia) Roko Jureškin	2024	0 (0)	1 (0)	0 (0)	2 (0)	3 (0)
202	FW	(Cameroon) Mollo Bessala	2021–Present	0 (0)	3 (0)	0 (0)	0 (0)	3 (0)
202	FW	(Moldova) Vyacheslav Kozma	2024–Present	0 (0)	1 (0)	0 (0)	2 (0)	3 (0)
241	GK	(Ukraine) Serhiy Perkhun	1999–2000	2 (0)	0 (0)	0 (0)	0 (0)	2 (0)
241	DF	(Georgia (country)) Giorgi Revazishvili	1999–2000	2 (0)	0 (0)	0 (0)	0 (0)	2 (0)
241	DF	(Nigeria) Isaac Okoronkwo	1998–2000	2 (0)	0 (0)	0 (0)	0 (0)	2 (0)
241	MF	(Romania) Marian Aliuță	1998–2000	2 (0)	0 (0)	0 (0)	0 (0)	2 (0)
241	FW	(Moldova) Serghei Rogaciov	1998–2000	2 (0)	0 (0)	0 (0)	0 (0)	2 (0)
241	GK	(Moldova) Evgheni Ivanov	1998–2000	2 (0)	0 (0)	0 (0)	0 (0)	2 (0)
241	MF	(Moldova) Alexandru Lapaci	1999–2002	0 (0)	0 (0)	2 (0)	0 (0)	2 (0)
241	FW	(Panama) Roberto Brown	2002–2004	0 (0)	0 (0)	2 (0)	0 (0)	2 (0)
241	DF	(Brazil) Joari Dos Santos	2004–2005	0 (0)	0 (0)	2 (0)	0 (0)	2 (0)
241	FW	(Ukraine) Aleksandr Bychkov	2004–2006	0 (0)	0 (0)	2 (0)	0 (0)	2 (0)
241	DF	(Moldova) Simeon Bulgaru	2007–2008	0 (0)	0 (0)	2 (0)	0 (0)	2 (0)
241	FW	(Bosnia and Herzegovina) Saša Kajkut	2007–2008	0 (0)	0 (0)	2 (1)	0 (0)	2 (1)
241	DF	(Argentina) Nicolas Demalde	2006–2007	0 (0)	0 (0)	2 (0)	0 (0)	2 (0)
241	MF	(Moldova) Evgheni Gorodețchi	2003–2004; 2007–2009	0 (0)	0 (0)	2 (1)	0 (0)	2 (1)
241	DF	(Ghana) Ghandi Kassenu	2011–2012	0 (0)	2 (0)	0 (0)	0 (0)	2 (0)
241	FW	(Brazil) Jhonatan	2011–2013	0 (0)	2 (0)	0 (0)	0 (0)	2 (0)
241	FW	(Argentina) Rafael Sosa	2011–2012	0 (0)	2 (0)	0 (0)	0 (0)	2 (0)
241	MF	(Moldova) Anatol Cheptine	2011–2013	0 (0)	1 (0)	1 (0)	0 (0)	2 (0)
241	DF	(Bolivia) Leonel Morales	2011–2012	0 (0)	2 (0)	0 (0)	0 (0)	2 (0)
241	DF	(Moldova) Alexandru Scripcenco	2009–2011; 2013–2014	0 (0)	0 (0)	2 (1)	0 (0)	2 (1)
241	FW	(Serbia) Marko Markovski	2013–2014	0 (0)	0 (0)	2 (0)	0 (0)	2 (0)
241	DF	(Ukraine) Vyacheslav Sharpar	2015	0 (0)	2 (0)	0 (0)	0 (0)	2 (0)
241	DF	(Moldova) Maxim Potîrniche	2015–2017	0 (0)	2 (0)	0 (0)	0 (0)	2 (0)
241	DF	(Moldova) Andrei Novicov	2003–2004; 2015–2016	0 (0)	2 (0)	0 (0)	0 (0)	2 (0)
241	DF	(Bosnia and Herzegovina) Amer Dupovac	2015–2016	0 (0)	1 (0)	1 (0)	0 (0)	2 (0)
241	FW	(Switzerland) Danijel Subotić (Note: Subotić was born in Croatia, and went on to represent Switzerland U19 at international level.)	2015–2017	0 (0)	0 (0)	2 (0)	0 (0)	2 (0)
241	DF	(Croatia) Dino Škvorc	2016–2017	0 (0)	0 (0)	2 (0)	0 (0)	2 (0)
241	FW	(Croatia) Josip Ivančić	2016–2017	0 (0)	0 (0)	2 (1)	0 (0)	2 (1)
241	DF	(Serbia) Vujadin Savić	2015–2017	0 (0)	0 (0)	2 (0)	0 (0)	2 (0)
241	DF	(Bosnia and Herzegovina) Zoran Kvržić	2016–2017	0 (0)	0 (0)	2 (0)	0 (0)	2 (0)
241	DF	(Moldova) Ion Jardan	2017–2018	0 (0)	0 (0)	2 (0)	0 (0)	2 (0)
241	MF	(Poland) Ariel Borysiuk	2019	0 (0)	2 (0)	0 (0)	0 (0)	2 (0)
241	MF	(Ukraine) Andriy Bliznichenko	2019–2021	0 (0)	1 (0)	1 (0)	0 (0)	2 (0)
241	FW	(Cameroon) Anatole Abang	2020	0 (0)	0 (0)	2 (1)	0 (0)	2 (1)
241	DF	(Moldova) Alexandr Belousov	2018–2023	0 (0)	1 (0)	1 (0)	0 (0)	2 (0)
241	FW	(Ghana) Basit Khalid	2021–2022	0 (0)	2 (0)	0 (0)	0 (0)	2 (0)
241	MF	(Moldova) Nichita Covali	2022–2024	0 (0)	1 (0)	0 (0)	1 (0)	2 (0)
241	MF	(Niger) Adamou Djibo	2023–2024	0 (0)	0 (0)	2 (0)	0 (0)	2 (0)
241	MF	(Moldova) Dan-Angelo Botan	2023–Present	0 (0)	2 (0)	0 (0)	0 (0)	2 (0)
241	DF	(North Macedonia) Stefan Despotovski	2024	0 (0)	1 (0)	0 (0)	1 (0)	2 (0)
241	DF	(Brazil) Átila	2025–Present	0 (0)	2 (0)	0 (0)	0 (0)	2 (0)
241	MF	(Moldova) Mihail Corotcov	2025–Present	0 (0)	2 (0)	0 (0)	0 (0)	2 (0)
241	FW	(Ivory Coast) Konan Jaures-Ulrich Loukou	2023–Present	0 (0)	1 (0)	0 (0)	1 (0)	2 (0)
284	MF	(Moldova) Vladimir Gaidamașciuc	1999–2000	1 (0)	0 (0)	0 (0)	0 (0)	1 (0)
284	FW	(Georgia (country)) Mikheil Khutsishvili	1999	1 (0)	0 (0)	0 (0)	0 (0)	1 (0)
284	FW	(Ukraine) Andriy Poroshyn	1999–2001	1 (0)	0 (0)	0 (0)	0 (0)	1 (0)
284	DF	(Ukraine) Andriy Parkhomenko	2000	1 (0)	0 (0)	0 (0)	0 (0)	1 (0)
284	MF	(Moldova) Vladimir Pustovit	1998–2000	1 (0)	0 (0)	0 (0)	0 (0)	1 (0)
284	MF	(Nigeria) Christian Jacob	2001–2002	0 (0)	0 (0)	1 (0)	0 (0)	1 (0)
284	DF	(Nigeria) Chiedo Chukwueke	2001–2002	0 (0)	0 (0)	1 (0)	0 (0)	1 (0)
284	MF	(Romania) Eduard Bandi	2003–2004	0 (0)	0 (0)	1 (0)	0 (0)	1 (0)
284	DF	(Romania) Valentin Necsulescu	2002–2003	0 (0)	0 (0)	1 (0)	0 (0)	1 (0)
284	MF	(Brazil) Igor de Lima	2003–2005	0 (0)	0 (0)	1 (0)	0 (0)	1 (0)
284	DF	(Belarus) Vyachaslaw Yaraslawski	2003–2005	0 (0)	0 (0)	1 (0)	0 (0)	1 (0)
284	DF	(Togo) Kwami Eninful	2006–2009	0 (0)	0 (0)	1 (0)	0 (0)	1 (0)
284	MF	(Moldova) Constantin Mandrîcenco	2008–2010	0 (0)	0 (0)	1 (0)	0 (0)	1 (0)
284	MF	(Moldova) Vadim Rață	2010–2017	0 (0)	1 (0)	0 (0)	0 (0)	1 (0)
284	FW	(Bolivia) Darwin Ríos	2012	0 (0)	0 (0)	1 (0)	0 (0)	1 (0)
284	DF	(Moldova) Alexandr Bolsacov	2013–2014	0 (0)	1 (0)	0 (0)	0 (0)	1 (0)
284	MF	(Croatia) Igor Jugović	2015–2016	0 (0)	1 (0)	0 (0)	0 (0)	1 (0)
284	MF	(Serbia) Mihajlo Cakić	2015	0 (0)	1 (0)	0 (0)	0 (0)	1 (0)
284	DF	(Moldova) Valeriu Macrițchii	2012–2019	0 (0)	1 (0)	0 (0)	0 (0)	1 (0)
284	DF	(Moldova) Andrei Macrițchii	2013–2019	0 (0)	1 (0)	0 (0)	0 (0)	1 (0)
284	MF	(Croatia) Ivan Crnov	2015	0 (0)	1 (0)	0 (0)	0 (0)	1 (0)
284	DF	(Albania) Fidan Aliti (Note: Aliti was born in Switzerland, and went on to represent Albania before joining Sheriff, and Kosovo after leaving Sheriff.)	2015–2016	0 (0)	0 (0)	1 (0)	0 (0)	1 (0)
284	FW	(Moldova) Artiom Puntus	2014–2018	0 (0)	0 (0)	1 (0)	0 (0)	1 (0)
284	MF	(Spain) José Ángel	2019	0 (0)	0 (0)	1 (0)	0 (0)	1 (0)
284	FW	(Brazil) Leandro	2019	0 (0)	0 (0)	1 (0)	0 (0)	1 (0)
284	FW	(Ghana) Richard Gadze	2020–2021	0 (0)	0 (0)	1 (0)	0 (0)	1 (0)
284	MF	(Switzerland) Max Veloso (Note: Veloso was born in Portugal, and went on to represent Switzerland U21 at international level.)	2020	0 (0)	1 (0)	0 (0)	0 (0)	1 (0)
284	MF	(Netherlands) Dabney dos Santos	2020–2021	0 (0)	1 (0)	0 (0)	0 (0)	1 (0)
284	FW	(Guinea-Bissau) Steve Ambri (Note: Ambri was born in France, and went on to represent Guinea-Bissau at international level.)	2022	0 (0)	1 (0)	0 (0)	0 (0)	1 (0)
284	DF	(Moldova) Danila Ignatov	2021–Present	0 (0)	1 (0)	0 (0)	0 (0)	1 (0)
284	MF	(Moldova) Adrian Hatman	2022–2024	0 (0)	1 (0)	0 (0)	0 (0)	1 (0)
284	MF	(Brazil) Fernando Neto	2025	0 (0)	1 (0)	0 (0)	0 (0)	1 (0)
284	FW	(Mali) Abdoulaye Diarra	2025	0 (0)	0 (0)	0 (0)	1 (0)	1 (0)

=== Goalscorers ===
As of match played 23 July 2026

	Name	Years	UEFA Cup	UEFA Europa League	UEFA Champions League	UEFA Conference League	Total	Ratio
1	(Belgium) Ziguy Badibanga	2017–2019	0 (0)	4 (11)	4 (8)	0 (0)	8 (19)	0.42
1	(Moldova) Henrique Luvannor	2011–2014; 2021; 2023–2024	0 (0)	2 (19)	6 (19)	0 (0)	8 (38)	0.21
3	(Mali) Adama Traoré	2021–2022	0 (0)	1 (2)	6 (14)	0 (0)	7 (16)	0.44
4	(Bulgaria) Ismail Isa	2013–2015	0 (0)	4 (10)	2 (8)	0 (0)	6 (18)	0.33
5	(Burkina Faso) Cyrille Bayala	2016–2017, 2024–2026	0 (0)	4 (4)	1 (4)	0 (2)	5 (10)	0.5
6	(Russia) Aleksandr Yerokhin	2007–2010	0 (0)	2 (11)	2 (11)	0 (0)	4 (22)	0.18
6	(Luxembourg) Sébastien Thill	2021–2022	0 (0)	1 (2)	3 (14)	0 (0)	4 (16)	0.25
6	(Nigeria) Rasheed Akanbi	2022–2025	0 (0)	2 (12)	2 (6)	0 (5)	4 (23)	0.17
6	(Guinea) Momo Yansané	2021–2023	0 (0)	2 (5)	2 (11)	0 (0)	4 (16)	0.25
6	(Brazil) Ricardinho	2013–2017, 2023–2024	0 (0)	2 (20)	2 (12)	0 (0)	4 (32)	0.13
6	Own goal	-	0	2	2	0 (0)	4	-
12	(Cameroon) Jerome Ngom Mbekeli	2023–2024	0 (0)	2 (9)	1 (4)	0 (2)	3 (15)	0.2
12	(Romania) Răzvan Cociș	2004–2006	0 (0)	0 (0)	3 (11)	0 (0)	3 (11)	0.27
12	(Belarus) Aliaksei Kuchuk	2005–2008; 2009–2010	0 (0)	0 (5)	3 (17)	0 (0)	3 (22)	0.14
12	(Moldova) Alexandru Suvorov	2002–2010	0 (0)	0 (2)	3 (13)	0 (0)	3 (15)	0.2
12	(Brazil) Fernando	2010–2014	0 (0)	1 (5)	2 (4)	0 (0)	3 (9)	0.33
12	(Colombia) Frank Castañeda	2020–2021	0 (0)	0 (1)	3 (14)	0 (0)	3 (15)	0.2
12	(Senegal) Mouhamed Diop	2022–2023	0 (0)	1 (8)	0 (0)	2 (4)	3 (12)	0.25
12	(Morocco) Amine Talal	2023–2024	0 (0)	0 (5)	3 (4)	0 (3)	3 (12)	0.25
12	(Nigeria) David Ankeye	2023–2024	0 (0)	3 (9)	0 (1)	0 (0)	3 (11)	0.27
12	(Nigeria) Elijah Odede	2025	0 (0)	2 (3)	0 (0)	1 (2)	3 (5)	0.6
22	(Moldova) Vadim Boreț	2001–2005	0 (0)	0 (0)	2 (10)	0 (0)	2 (10)	0.2
22	(Georgia (country)) Vazha Tarkhnishvili	1999–2012	0 (4)	0 (10)	2 (40)	0 (0)	2 (54)	0.04
22	(Ukraine) Andriy Nesteruk	1999–2000; 2002–2004	0 (0)	0 (0)	2 (10)	0 (0)	2(10)	0.2
22	(Moldova) Iurie Priganiuc	2002–2004	0 (0)	0 (0)	2 (12)	0 (0)	2 (12)	0.17
22	(Moldova) Alexandru Epureanu	2004–2006	0 (0)	0 (0)	2 (8)	0 (0)	2 (8)	0.25
22	(Burkina Faso) Wilfried Balima	2005–2020	0 (0)	1 (39)	1 (27)	0 (0)	2 (66)	0.03
22	(Brazil) Nadson	2007–2011	0 (0)	0 (8)	2 (13)	0 (0)	2 (21)	0.1
22	(Serbia) Vladimir Volkov	2009–2011	0 (0)	0 (11)	2 (9)	0 (0)	2 (20)	0.1
22	(Brazil) Jymmy França	2009–2011	0 (0)	2 (9)	0 (6)	0 (0)	2 (15)	0.13
22	(Brazil) Cadú	2013–2016	0 (0)	1 (10)	1 (8)	0 (0)	2 (18)	0.11
22	(Croatia) Josip Brezovec	2016–2018	0 (0)	1 (8)	1 (6)	0 (0)	2 (14)	0.14
22	(Brazil) Jô Santos	2016–2018	0 (0)	0 (4)	2 (4)	0 (0)	2 (8)	0.25
22	(Cameroon) Robert Tambe	2019–2020	0 (0)	1 (4)	1 (2)	0 (0)	2 (6)	0.33
22	(Burkina Faso) Cedric Badolo	2022, 2023–2024	0 (0)	1 (21)	0 (8)	1 (6)	2 (35)	0.06
22	(Colombia) Cristian Tovar	2023–2024	0 (0)	2 (8)	0 (4)	0 (0)	2 (12)	0.17
22	(Nigeria) Peter Ademo	2023–2026	0 (0)	1 (14)	1 (4)	0 (4)	2 (22)	0.09
38	(Georgia (country)) Davit Mujiri	1999–2001	1 (4)	0 (0)	0 (0)	0 (0)	1 (4)	0.25
38	(Moldova) Ruslan Barburoș	1998–1999; 2000; 2001–2002	0 (0)	0 (0)	1 (7)	0 (0)	1 (7)	0.14
38	(Moldova) Victor Comleonoc	2001–2004	0 (0)	0 (0)	1 (9)	0 (0)	1 (9)	0.11
38	(Moldova) Sergiu Dadu	1999–2004; 2012–2013	0 (0)	0 (1)	1 (8)	0 (0)	1 (9)	0.11
38	(Romania) Cristian Tudor	2001–2003	0 (0)	0 (0)	1 (7)	0 (0)	1 (7)	0.14
38	(Ukraine) Serhiy Kuznetsov	2004	0 (0)	0 (0)	1 (4)	0 (0)	1 (4)	0.25
38	(Romania) George Florescu	2004–2006	0 (0)	0 (0)	1 (12)	0 (0)	1 (12)	0.08
38	(Burkina Faso) Ben Idrissa Dermé	2004–2008	0 (0)	0 (0)	1 (5)	0 (0)	1 (5)	0.2
38	(Ukraine) Oleh Humenyuk	2001–2007	0 (0)	0 (0)	1 (14)	0 (0)	1 (14)	0.07
38	(Benin) Razak Omotoyossi	2006–2007	0 (0)	0 (0)	1 (4)	0 (0)	1 (4)	0.25
38	(Moldova) Evgheni Gorodețchi	2007–2009	0 (0)	0 (0)	1 (2)	0 (0)	1 (2)	0.5
38	(Bosnia and Herzegovina) Saša Kajkut	2007–2008	0 (0)	0 (0)	1 (2)	0 (0)	1 (2)	0.5
38	(Moldova) Serghei Alexeev	2004–2009	0 (0)	0 (0)	1 (5)	0 (0)	1 (5)	0.2
38	(Moldova) Igor Picușceac	2001–2003; 2008–2009; 2015	0 (0)	0 (0)	1 (3)	0 (0)	1 (3)	0.33
38	(Senegal) Amath Diedhiou	2009–2011	0 (0)	1 (10)	0 (11)	0 (0)	1 (21)	0.05
38	(Montenegro) Baćo Nikolić	2010	0 (0)	0 (2)	1 (4)	0 (0)	1 (6)	0.17
38	(Burkina Faso) Florent Rouamba	2006–2012	0 (0)	1 (14)	0 (16)	0 (0)	1 (30)	0.03
38	(Moldova) Serghei Gheorghiev	2008–2013; 2014–2015; 2015–2016	0 (0)	0 (3)	1 (6)	0 (0)	1 (9)	0.11
38	(Slovenia) Miral Samardžić	2010–2014	0 (0)	0 (16)	1 (12)	0 (0)	1 (28)	0.04
38	(Serbia) Tomislav Pajović	2012–2014	0 (0)	1 (2)	0 (2)	0 (0)	1 (4)	0.25
38	(Moldova) Alexandru Scripcenco	2010–2014	0 (0)	0 (0)	1 (2)	0 (0)	1 (2)	0.5
38	(Brazil) Jhulliam	2013–2014	0 (0)	1 (5)	0 (1)	0 (0)	1 (6)	0.17
38	(Romania) Andrei Mureșan	2014–2015	0 (0)	0 (2)	1 (4)	0 (0)	1 (6)	0.17
38	(Ghana) Fred Benson	2014	0 (0)	0 (0)	1 (4)	0 (0)	1 (4)	0.25
38	(Croatia) Josip Ivančić	2016–2017	0 (0)	0 (0)	1 (2)	0 (0)	1 (2)	0.5
38	(Brazil) Jairo	2017–2018	0 (0)	1 (8)	0 (0)	0 (0)	1 (8)	0.13
38	(Bosnia and Herzegovina) Rifet Kapić	2018; 2020–2021	0 (0)	1 (5)	0 (4)	0 (0)	1 (9)	0.11
38	(Albania) Liridon Latifi	2019–2020	0 (0)	0 (4)	1 (2)	0 (0)	1 (6)	0.17
38	(Senegal) Ousmane N'Diaye	2019–2020	0 (0)	1 (4)	0 (3)	0 (0)	1 (7)	0.14
38	(Belarus) Yury Kendysh	2017; 2017–2019	0 (0)	1 (13)	0 (6)	0 (0)	1 (19)	0.05
38	(Croatia) Gabrijel Boban	2019–2021	0 (0)	1 (4)	0 (4)	0 (0)	1 (8)	0.13
38	(Cameroon) Anatole Abang	2020	0 (0)	0 (0)	1 (2)	0 (0)	1 (2)	0.5
38	(Croatia) Andrej Lukić	2019–2020	0 (0)	0 (2)	1 (2)	0 (0)	1 (4)	0.25
38	(Moldova) Veaceslav Posmac	2017–2021	0 (0)	1 (13)	0 (8)	0 (0)	1 (21)	0.05
38	(Greece) Dimitris Kolovos	2020–2021; 2021–2022	0 (0)	0 (1)	1 (10)	0 (0)	1 (11)	0.09
38	(Colombia) Danilo Arboleda	2021	0 (0)	0 (0)	1 (14)	0 (0)	1 (14)	0.07
38	(Uzbekistan) Jasurbek Yakhshiboev	2021–2022	0 (0)	0 (2)	1 (3)	0 (0)	1 (5)	0.2
38	(Peru) Gustavo Dulanto	2021–2022	0 (0)	0 (1)	1 (14)	0 (0)	1 (15)	0.07
38	(North Macedonia) Boban Nikolov	2021–2022	0 (0)	0 (2)	1 (5)	0 (0)	1 (7)	0.14
38	(Nigeria) Iyayi Atiemwen	2022–2023	0 (0)	1 (7)	0 (1)	0 (3)	1 (11)	0.09
38	(Burkina Faso) Abdoul Tapsoba	2023	0 (0)	0 (0)	0 (0)	1 (4)	1 (4)	0.25
38	(Ivory Coast) Armel Zohouri	2022–2024, 2025	0 (0)	1 (13)	0 (4)	0 (4)	1 (21)	0.05
38	(Mauritania) Papa Ndiaga Yade	2024–2026	0 (0)	1 (6)	0 (0)	0 (3)	1 (9)	0.11
38	(Morocco) Ayyoub Allach	2024	0 (0)	1 (4)	0 (0)	0 (2)	1 (6)	0.17
38	(Armenia) Artur Serobyan	2025	0 (0)	1 (4)	0 (0)	0 (1)	1 (5)	0.2
38	(Ivory Coast) Konan Loukou	2023–Present	0 (0)	1 (4)	0 (0)	0 (1)	1 (5)	0.2

=== Clean sheets ===
As of match played 23 July 2026

	Name	Years	UEFA Cup	UEFA Europa League	UEFA Champions League	UEFA Conference League	Total	Ratio
1	(Croatia) Zvonimir Mikulić	2017–2018; 2018–2021	0 (0)	5 (13)	3 (9)	0 (0)	8 (22)	0.36
1	(Greece) Giorgos Athanasiadis	2021–2022	0 (0)	1 (2)	7 (13)	0 (0)	8 (15)	0.53
3	(Romania) Sebastian Huțan	2002–2006	0 (0)	0 (0)	6 (16)	0 (0)	6 (16)	0.38
3	(Moldova) Stanislav Namașco	2008–2010	0 (0)	2 (6)	4 (10)	0 (0)	6 (16)	0.38
3	(Moldova) Serghei Pașcenco	2002; 2004–2007; 2014–2015; 2018–2024	0 (0)	2 (4)	4 (5)	0 (0)	6 (9)	0.67
6	(Bulgaria) Vladislav Stoyanov	2010–2012	0 (0)	3 (8)	2 (10)	0 (0)	5 (18)	0.28
7	(Ghana) Razak Abalora	2022–2023	0 (0)	0 (0)	4 (6)	0 (0)	4 (6)	0.67
7	(Ukraine) Maksym Koval	2022–2024	0 (0)	2 (13)	2 (5)	0 (4)	4 (22)	0.18
9	(Moldova) Dmitri Stajila	2009–2016	0 (0)	2 (5)	1 (2)	0 (0)	3 (7)	0.43
9	(Argentina) Matías Degra	2014–2015	0 (0)	0 (2)	3 (4)	0 (0)	3 (6)	0.5
9	(Moldova) Dumitru Celeadnic	2020–2023, 2023–2024	0 (0)	2 (3)	1 (3)	0 (1)	3 (7)	0.43
12	(Moldova) Olexandr Bokarev	2001–2002	0 (0)	0 (0)	2 (4)	0 (0)	2 (4)	0.5
12	(Bulgaria) Bozhidar Mitrev	2015–2017	0 (0)	1 (2)	1 (2)	0 (0)	2 (4)	0.5
12	(Croatia) Vjekoslav Tomić	2013–2014	0 (0)	2 (8)	0 (2)	0 (0)	2 (10)	0.2
12	(Bulgaria) Ivan Dyulgerov	2025–Present	(-)	2 (5)	(-)	0 (2)	2 (7)	0.29
16	(Ukraine) Serhiy Perkhun	1999–2000	1 (2)	0 (0)	0 (0)	0 (0)	1 (2)	0.5
16	(Moldova) Evgheni Ivanov	1998–2000	1 (2)	0 (0)	0 (0)	0 (0)	1 (2)	0.5
16	(Moldova) Emil Tîmbur	2026–Present	(-)	1 (2)	(-)	(-)	1 (2)	0.5
19	(Moldova) Alexandru Chirilov	1998–1999; 2001–2003; 2005	0 (0)	0 (0)	0 (4)	0 (0)	0 (4)	0
19	(Malta) Rashed Al-Tumi	2024–2025	(-)	0 (4)	(-)	0 (1)	0 (5)	0

== Overall record ==
=== By competition ===
As of match played 6 August 2026

Competition	Played	Won	Drew	Lost	GF	GA	GD	Win%
UEFA Champions League	94	35	19	40	99	98	+1	37.23
UEFA Cup / UEFA Europa League	81	17	28	36	63	103	−40	20.99
UEFA Conference League	9	1	1	7	6	16	−10	11.11
Total	182	53	48	81	168	217	−49	29.12

Legend: GF = Goals For. GA = Goals Against. GD = Goal Difference.

=== By country ===
As of match played 6 August 2026

Country	Pld	W	D	L	GF	GA	GD	Win%
Albania	8	5	1	2	12	5	+7	62.50
Andorra	2	2	0	0	5	0	+5	100.00
Armenia	10	7	3	0	11	1	+10	70.00
Austria	2	0	0	2	1	6	−5	0.00
Azerbaijan	7	2	1	4	5	9	−4	28.57
Belarus	4	1	1	2	8	6	+2	25.00
Belgium	4	0	1	3	2	10	−8	0.00
Bosnia	4	1	2	1	1	1	+0	25.00
Croatia	10	1	3	6	5	15	−10	10.00
Cyprus	2	2	0	0	4	0	+4	100.00
Czech Republic	12	1	5	6	7	18	−11	8.33
Denmark	2	0	1	1	0	2	−2	0.00
England	4	0	0	4	1	9	−8	0.00
Estonia	2	1	1	0	2	1	+1	50.00
Faroe Islands	2	1	1	0	3	2	+1	50.00
Finland	2	2	0	0	2	0	+2	100.00
France	4	0	1	3	2	6	−4	0.00
Georgia	4	2	0	2	7	6	+1	50.00
Greece	2	0	0	2	0	3	−3	0.00
Iceland	2	1	0	1	2	2	+0	50.00
Ireland	1	0	1	0	1	1	+0	0.00
Israel	6	1	1	4	4	13	−9	16.67
Italy	4	0	0	4	3	11	−8	0.00
Kazakhstan	4	2	0	2	8	5	+3	50.00
Kosovo	2	1	0	1	5	2	+3	50.00
Luxembourg	3	2	0	1	4	1	+3	66.67
Macedonia	2	0	1	1	0	1	−1	0.00
Malta	2	2	0	0	6	1	+5	100.00
Montenegro	4	3	1	0	11	1	+10	75.00
Netherlands	6	1	1	4	7	12	−5	16.67
Norway	6	1	2	3	4	8	−4	16.67
Poland	2	0	2	0	1	1	+0	0.00
Portugal	2	1	0	1	2	2	+0	50.00
Romania	4	1	2	1	4	2	+2	25.00
Russia	6	1	5	0	5	4	+1	16.67
Serbia	6	3	2	1	8	5	+3	50.00
Serbia and Montenegro	2	0	0	2	0	2	−2	0.00
Slovakia	2	0	1	1	1	2	−1	0.00
Slovenia	8	2	3	3	2	7	−5	25.00
Spain	4	1	0	3	2	9	−7	25.00
Sweden	4	0	1	3	2	6	−4	0.00
Switzerland	5	0	1	4	3	10	−7	0.00
Turkey	4	0	0	4	0	6	−6	0.00
Ukraine	6	2	3	1	5	3	+2	33.33

=== By club ===
As of match played 6 August 2026

Opponent	Played	Won	Drawn	Lost	For	Against	Difference	Ratio
(Sweden) AIK	2	0	1	1	2	3	−1	0.00
(Kazakhstan) Aktobe	2	1	0	1	4	1	+3	50.00
(Armenia) Alashkert	2	2	0	0	4	1	+3	100.00
(Slovenia) Aluminij	2	1	1	0	1	0	+1	50.00
(Belgium) Anderlecht	4	0	1	3	2	10	−8	0.00
(Russia) Anzhi Makhachkala	2	0	2	0	1	1	+0	0.00
(Armenia) Araks Ararat	2	2	0	0	3	0	+3	100.00
(Netherlands) AZ	2	0	1	1	2	3	−1	0.00
(Switzerland) Basel	2	0	0	2	0	4	−4	0.00
(Belarus) BATE Borisov	4	1	1	2	8	6	+2	25.00
(Turkey) Beşiktaş	2	0	0	2	0	4	−4	0.00
(Portugal) Braga	2	1	0	1	2	2	+0	50.00
(Denmark) Copenhagen	2	0	1	1	0	2	−2	0.00
(Albania) Dinamo Tirana	2	1	0	1	3	2	+1	50.00
(Croatia) Dinamo Zagreb	8	1	3	4	5	11	−6	12.50
(Republic of Ireland) Dundalk	1	0	1	0	1	1	+0	0.00
(Ukraine) Dynamo Kyiv	2	1	1	0	2	0	+2	50.00
(Sweden) Elfsborg	2	0	0	2	0	3	−3	0.00
(Romania) Farul Constanța	2	1	0	1	3	1	+2	50.00
(Czech Republic) Fastav Zlín	2	1	1	0	1	0	+1	50.00
(Turkey) Fenerbahçe	2	0	0	2	0	2	−2	0.00
(Estonia) Flora Tallinn	2	1	1	0	2	1	+1	50.00
(Luxembourg) Fola Esch	1	1	0	0	2	0	+2	100.00
(Austria) Grazer AK	2	0	0	2	1	6	−5	0.00
(Israel) Hapoel Be'er Sheva	2	0	1	1	2	3	−1	0.00
(Italy) Inter Milan	2	0	0	2	2	6	−4	0.00
(Finland) Inter Turku	2	2	0	0	2	0	+2	100.00
(Luxembourg) Jeunesse Esch	2	1	0	1	2	1	+1	50.00
(Faroe Islands) KÍ Klaksvík	2	1	1	0	3	2	+1	50.00
(Albania) Kukësi	2	1	0	1	2	2	+0	50.00
(Poland) Legia Warsaw	2	0	2	0	1	1	+0	0.00
(Russia) Lokomotiv Moscow	2	1	1	0	3	2	+1	50.00
(Israel) Maccabi Haifa	2	1	0	1	2	4	−2	50.00
(Israel) Maccabi Tel Aviv	2	0	0	2	0	6	−6	0.00
(England) Manchester United	2	0	0	2	0	5	−5	0.00
(Slovenia) Maribor	2	1	1	0	1	0	+1	50.00
(France) Marseille	2	0	1	1	1	2	−1	0.00
(France) Nice	2	0	0	2	1	4	−3	0.00
(Norway) Odd	2	0	1	1	0	3	−3	0.00
(Slovenia) Olimpija Ljubljana (1945–2005)	2	0	1	1	0	3	−3	0.00
(Slovenia) Olimpija Ljubljana	2	0	0	2	0	4	−4	0.00
(Greece) Olympiacos	2	0	0	2	0	3	−3	0.00
(Cyprus) Omonia	2	2	0	0	4	0	+4	100.00
(Serbia) Partizan	4	1	0	3	3	4	−1	25.00
(Albania) Partizani	2	1	1	0	2	1	+1	50.00
(Kosovo) Prishtina	2	1	0	1	5	2	+3	50.00
(Armenia) Pyunik	4	1	3	0	2	0	+2	25.00
(Azerbaijan) Qarabağ	5	1	1	3	3	7	−4	20.00
(Andorra) Rànger's	2	2	0	0	5	0	+5	100.00
(Spain) Real Madrid	2	1	0	1	2	4	−2	50.00
(Spain) Real Sociedad	2	0	0	2	0	5	−5	0.00
(Serbia) Red Star Belgrade	2	1	1	0	2	1	+1	50.00
(Croatia) Rijeka	2	0	0	2	0	4	−4	0.00
(Italy) Roma	2	0	0	2	1	5	−4	0.00
(Norway) Rosenborg	2	0	0	2	1	4	−3	0.00
(Georgia (country)) Saburtalo Tbilisi	2	1	0	1	3	4	−1	50.00
(Switzerland) Servette	2	0	1	1	2	3	−1	0.00
(Ukraine) Shakhtar Donetsk	4	1	2	1	3	3	+0	25.00
(North Macedonia) Shkëndija	2	0	1	1	0	1	−1	0.00
(Czech Republic) Sigma Olomouc	2	0	2	0	1	1	+0	0.00
(Czech Republic) Slavia Prague	4	0	2	2	3	10	−7	0.00
(Malta) Sliema Wanderers	2	2	0	0	6	1	+5	100.00
(Slovakia) Slovan Bratislava	2	0	1	1	1	2	−1	0.00
(Czech Republic) Sparta Prague	2	0	0	2	0	3	−3	0.00
(Russia) Spartak Moscow	2	0	2	0	1	1	+0	0.00
(Switzerland) St. Gallen	1	0	0	1	1	3	−2	0.00
(Romania) Steaua București	2	0	2	0	1	1	+0	0.00
(Montenegro) Sutjeska Nikšić	4	3	1	0	11	1	+10	75.00
(Albania) Teuta Durrës	2	2	0	0	5	0	+5	100.00
(Georgia (country)) Torpedo Kutaisi	2	1	0	1	4	2	+2	50.00
(England) Tottenham Hotspur	2	0	0	2	1	4	−3	0.00
(Norway) Tromsø	2	1	1	0	3	1	+2	50.00
(Netherlands) Twente	2	1	0	1	3	2	+1	50.00
(Armenia) Ulisses	2	2	0	0	2	0	+2	100.00
(Netherlands) Utrecht	2	0	0	2	2	7	−5	0.00
(Iceland) Valur	2	1	0	1	2	2	+0	50.00
(Czech Republic) Viktoria Plzeň	2	0	0	2	2	4	−2	0.00
(Serbia) Vojvodina	2	1	1	0	3	2	+1	50.00
(Bosnia and Herzegovina) Željezničar Sarajevo	2	0	1	1	0	1	−1	0.00
(Kazakhstan) Zhenis Astana	2	1	0	1	4	4	+0	50.00
(Azerbaijan) Zira	2	1	0	1	2	2	+0	50.00
(Bosnia and Herzegovina) Zrinjski Mostar	2	1	1	0	1	0	+1	50.00
