= Sanar =

Sanar (Persian: سنار) may refer to:

- Sanar-e Olya, a village in Mazandaran Province, Iran
- Sanar-e Sofla, a village in Mazandaran Province, Iran

== See also ==
- Sanare (disambiguation)
