= Aluminium amalgam =

Alloy of mercury and aluminium

Aluminium amalgam is a solution of aluminium in mercury. In practice the term refers to particles or pieces of aluminium with a surface coating of the amalgam. A gray solid, it is typically used for organic reductions. It is written as Al(Hg) in reactions.

Al(Hg) may be prepared by either grinding aluminium pellets or wire in mercury, or by allowing aluminium wire to react with a solution of mercury(II) chloride in water.

This amalgam is used as a chemical reagent to reduce compounds, such as of imines to amines. The aluminium is the ultimate electron donor, and the mercury serves to mediate the electron transfer and to remove passivating oxide.

The reaction and the waste from it contains mercury, so special safety precautions and disposal methods are needed. As an environmentally friendlier alternative, hydrides or other reducing agents can often be used to accomplish the same synthetic result. An alloy of aluminium and gallium was proposed as a method of hydrogen generation, as the gallium renders the aluminium more reactive by preventing it from forming an oxide layer. Mercury has this same effect on aluminium, but also serves additional functions related to electron transfer that make aluminium amalgams useful for some reactions that would not be possible with gallium.

== Reactivity ==
Aluminium exposed to air is ordinarily protected by a molecule-thin layer of its own oxide. This aluminium oxide layer serves as a protective barrier to the underlying unoxidized aluminium and prevents amalgamation from occurring. No reaction takes place when oxidized aluminium is exposed to mercury. However, if any elemental aluminium is exposed (even by a recent scratch), the mercury may combine with it to form the amalgam. This amalgamation can continue well beyond the vulnerable aluminium that was exposed, potentially reacting with a large amount of the raw aluminium before it finally ends.

The net result is similar to the mercury electrodes often used in electrochemistry, however instead of providing electrons from an electrical supply, they are provided by the aluminium which becomes oxidized in the process. The reaction that occurs at the surface of the amalgam may actually be a hydrogenation rather than a reduction.

The presence of water in the solution is reportedly necessary; the electron rich amalgam will oxidize aluminium and generate hydrogen gas from water, creating aluminium hydroxide (Al(OH)_{3}) and free mercury. The electrons from the aluminium reduce mercuric Hg^{2+} ion to metallic mercury. The metallic mercury can then form an amalgam with the exposed aluminium. The amalgamated aluminium then is oxidized by water, converting the aluminium to aluminium hydroxide and releasing free metallic mercury. The generated mercury then cycles through these last two steps until the aluminium supply is exhausted.

$$\ce{2Al + 3Hg^2+ + 6H2O -> 2Al(OH)3 + 3H2 +3Hg}$$
$$\ce{Hg + Al -> Hg*Al}$$
$$\ce{2 Hg*Al + 6 H2O -> 2 Al(OH)3 + 2 Hg + 3 H2}$$

Due to the reactivity of aluminium amalgam, restrictions are placed on the use and handling of mercury in proximity with aluminium. In particular, large amounts of mercury are not allowed aboard aircraft under most circumstances because of the risk of it forming amalgam with exposed aluminium parts in the aircraft. Even the transportation and packaging of mercury-containing thermometers and barometers is severely restricted. Accidental mercury spills in aircraft do sometimes result in insurance write-offs.

== See also ==
- Amalgam
- Aluminium-gallium
