= Sanare =

Sanare may refer to:

- Sanare, Burkina Faso, a village in Bam Province, Burkina Faso
- Sanare, Venezuela, a city in Lara state, Venezuela

== See also ==
- Sanar (disambiguation)
