= NAFO =

NAFO may refer to:

- Northwest Atlantic Fisheries Organization
- The North Atlantic Fella Organization, a social media movement dedicated to countering Russian disinformation about the 2022 Russian invasion of Ukraine.

== See also ==
- Nafo, a village in Burkina Faso
- Nation Ford High School, a high school in Fort Mill, South Carolina
- For the headgear of Senegal called Nafo see Kufi
