= Aminata Diallo Glez =

Burkinabé filmmaker, actor, and producer (born 1972)

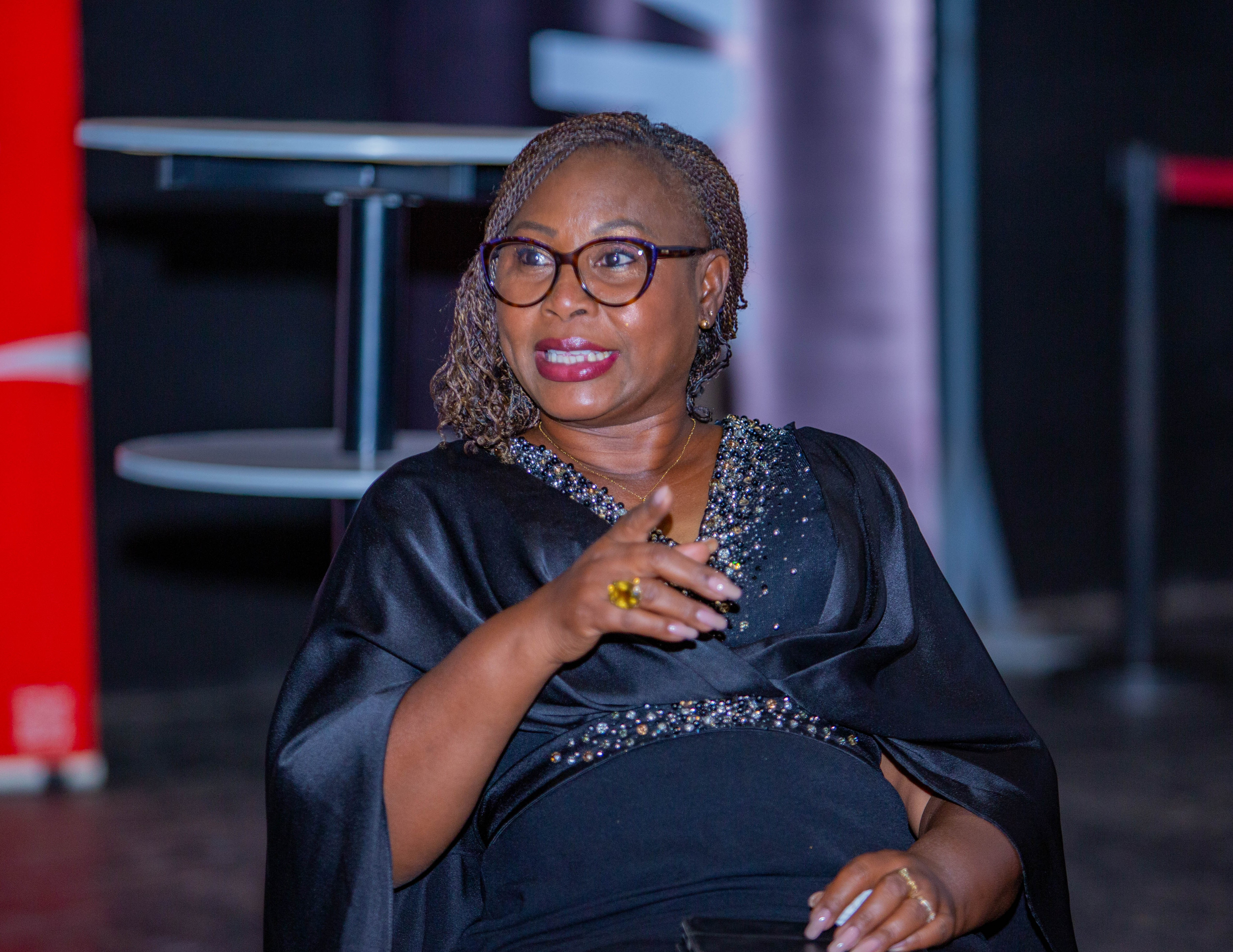
- Born: 1972 (age 53–54); Dori, Burkina Faso
- Occupations: Actress, producer
- Spouse: Damien Glez
- Awards: Best Series at FESPACO 200

Aminata Diallo Glez (born 1972) is a Burkinabé filmmaker, actor, and producer also known as Kadi Jolie.

== Life ==
Born in Dori, Burkina Faso, Aminata Diallo is one of nine children of Hassane Diallo, a veterinary doctor, and Mandy Togoyéni. She hoped as a child to be a doctor, but her father died in 1983, when she was in high school. She continued her education in Wemtenga, a district of Ouagadougou. After encountering Théâtre de la fraternité, the theatre troupe of Jean-Pierre Guingané, she joined the troupe after school. Instead of taking up a place to study linguistics at the University of Ouagadougou, she became a full-time actor, touring with Théâtre de la fraternité.

In the early 1990s Fanta Regina Nacro offered her a role in the film Puk-Nini, which started Diallo's new career as a screen actress. As the principal heroine of the TV series Kadi jolie, she acquired an Africa-wide following.

She started her own TV production company, Jovial Productions, which has produced series including 'Trois hommes, un village' (winner of Best Series at FESPACO 2005), Trois femmes, un village and Super flics (or Marc and Malika). In 2006 she also founded an art festival, "Fet' Arts".

She is married to Damien Glez, the cartoonist for Jeune Afrique.

For a while she retired from public life to care for her mother, who had cancer, and who died in 2019.

== Filmography ==
=== Producer ===
- Super flics (2008)
- Trois femmes, un village (2009)

=== Actress ===
- Puk Nini de Fanta Régina Nacro (1996) as Ada
- Conseils d'une tante d'Idrissa Ouedraogo (2001) as Kadi Jolie
- Kadi Jolie d'Idrissa Ouedraogo (2001) as Kadi Jolie
