= Abra, Burkina Faso =

Village in Bourzanga Department, Burkina Faso

- Location in Burkina Faso
- Coordinates: 13°45′43″N 1°29′05″W
- Country: Burkina Faso
- Region: Centre-Nord Region
- Province: Bam Province
- Department: Bourzanga Department

Population (2019)
  - Total: 1,620

Abra, Burkina Faso is a village in the Bourzanga Department of Bam Province in northern Burkina Faso.

Population
Year	Pop.	±%
2006	932	—
2019 (estimate)	1,620	+73.8%

== Notable people ==
- Ben Idrissa Dermé (1982–2016) was a Burkinabé international footballer
