= Felenga =

Village in Bourzanga Department, Burkina Faso

- Location in Burkina Faso
- Coordinates: 13°47′N 1°39′W
- Country: Burkina Faso
- Region: Centre-Nord Region
- Province: Bam Province
- Department: Bourzanga Department

Population (2019)
  - Total: 820
- Time zone: UTC+0 (GMT 0)

Felenga is a village in the Bourzanga Department of Bam Province in northern Burkina Faso.

Population
Year	Pop.	±%
1985	264	—
2006	472	+78.8%
2019 (estimate)	820	+73.7%
