= Zon, Burkina Faso =

Village in Bourzanga Department, Burkina Faso

Zon
- Location in Burkina Faso
- Coordinates: 13°44′N 1°37′W
- Country: Burkina Faso
- Region: Centre-Nord Region
- Province: Bam Province
- Department: Bourzanga Department

Population (2019)
  - Total: 2,602
- Time zone: UTC+0 (GMT 0)

Zon is a town in the Bourzanga Department of Bam Province in northern Burkina Faso.

Population
| Year | Pop. | ±% |
|---|---|---|
| 1985 | 747 | — |
| 2006 | 1,497 | +100.4% |
| 2019 (estimate) | 2,602 | +73.8% |
