= Doundégué =

Village in Bourzanga Department, Burkina Faso

Doundégué Dandegue
- Location in Burkina Faso
- Coordinates: 13°44′N 1°24′W
- Country: Burkina Faso
- Region: Centre-Nord Region
- Province: Bam Province
- Department: Bourzanga Department

Population (2019)
  - Total: 662
- Time zone: UTC+0 (GMT 0)

Doundégué is a village in the Bourzanga Department of Bam Province in northern Burkina Faso.

Population
Year	Pop.	±%
1985	432	—
2006	381	−11.8%
2019 (estimate)	662	+73.8%
