= Bassé =

Village in Bourzanga Department, Burkina Faso

- Location in Burkina Faso
- Coordinates: 13°42′21″N 1°38′59″W
- Country: Burkina Faso
- Region: Centre-Nord Region
- Province: Bam Province
- Department: Bourzanga Department

Population (2019)
  - Total: 3,791
- Time zone: UTC+0 (GMT 0)

Bassé is a town in the Bourzanga Department of Bam Province in northern Burkina Faso.

Population
Year	Pop.	±%
1985	1,285	—
2006	2,134	+66.1%
2019 (estimate)	3,709	+73.8%
