= Zana, Burkina Faso =

Village in Bourzanga Department, Burkina Faso

- Location in Burkina Faso
- Coordinates: 13°48′N 1°42′W
- Country: Burkina Faso
- Region: Centre-Nord Region
- Province: Bam Province
- Department: Bourzanga Department

Population (2019)
  - Total: 3,462
- Time zone: UTC+0 (GMT 0)

Zana, Burkina Faso is a village in the Bourzanga Department of Bam Province in northern Burkina Faso.

Population
Year	Pop.	±%
1985	1,052	—
2006	1,992	+89.4%
2019 (estimate)	3,462	+73.8%
