= Kiéké =

Village in Bourzanga Department, Burkina Faso

Kiéké Kieta
- Country: Burkina Faso
- Region: Centre-Nord Region
- Province: Bam Province
- Department: Bourzanga Department

Population (2019)
  - Total: 1,583
- Time zone: UTC+0 (GMT 0)

Kiéké is a village in the Bourzanga Department of Bam Province in northern Burkina Faso.

Population
Year	Pop.	±%
1985	615	—
2005	831	+35.1%
2019 (estimate)	1,583	+90.5%
