= Fétorané =

Village in Bourzanga Department, Burkina Faso

- Country: Burkina Faso
- Region: Centre-Nord Region
- Province: Bam Province
- Department: Bourzanga Department

Population (2019)
  - Total: 662
- Time zone: UTC+0 (GMT 0)

Fétorané is a village in the Bourzanga Department of Bam Province in northern Burkina Faso.

Population
Year	Pop.	±%
2006	381	—
2019 (estimate)	662	+73.8%
