= Nioumbila =

Village in Bourzanga Department, Burkina Faso

- Country: Burkina Faso
- Region: Centre-Nord Region
- Province: Bam Province
- Department: Bourzanga Department

Population (2019)
  - Total: 3,415
- Time zone: UTC+0 (GMT 0)

Nioumbila is a town in the Bourzanga Department of Bam Province in northern Burkina Faso.

Population
Year	Pop.	±%
1985	897	—
2006	1,965	+119.1%
2019 (estimate)	3,415	+73.8%
