= Maléoualé =

Village in Bourzanga Department, Burkina Faso

Maléoualé Malaoul
- Location in Burkina Faso
- Coordinates: 13°42′N 1°20′W
- Country: Burkina Faso
- Region: Centre-Nord Region
- Province: Bam Province
- Department: Bourzanga Department

Population (2019)
  - Total: 1,543
- Time zone: UTC+0 (GMT 0)

Maléoualé is a village in the Bourzanga Department of Bam Province in northern Burkina Faso.

Population
Year	Pop.	±%
1985	498	—
2006	888	+78.3%
2019 (estimate)	1,543	+73.8%
