= Zomkalga =

Village in Bourzanga Department, Burkina Faso

- Country: Burkina Faso
- Region: Centre-Nord Region
- Province: Bam Province
- Department: Bourzanga Department

Population (2019)
  - Total: 1,516
- Time zone: UTC+0 (GMT 0)

Zomkalga is a village in the Bourzanga Department of Bam Province in northern Burkina Faso.

Population
Year	Pop.	±%
1985	330	—
2006	872	+164.2%
2019 (estimate)	1,516	+73.9%
