= Kourao =

Village in Bourzanga Department, Burkina Faso

Coordinates: 13°48′N 1°34′W

Kourao Kouraogo
- Interactive map of Kourao
- Country: Burkina Faso
- Region: Centre-Nord Region
- Province: Bam Province
- Department: Bourzanga Department

Population (2019)
  - Total: 2,609
- Time zone: UTC+0 (GMT 0)

Kourao is a town in the Bourzanga Department of Bam Province in northern Burkina Faso.

Population
Year	Pop.	±%
1985	1,005	—
2006	1,501	+49.4%
2019 (estimate)	2,609	+73.8%
