= Bourzanga Department =

Department in Bam Province, Burkina Faso

Coordinates: 13°40′41″N 1°32′46″W

Bourzanga
- Department
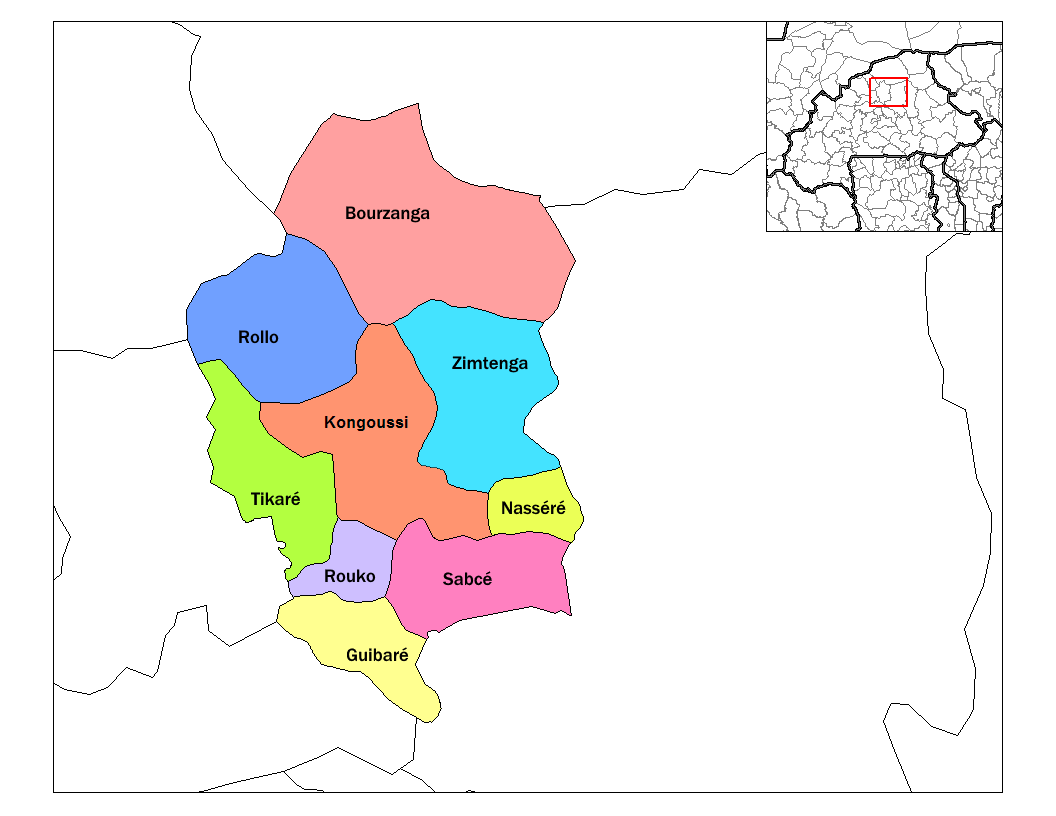
- Bourzanga Department located in the north of the region
- Country: Burkina Faso
- Region: Centre-Nord Region
- Province: Bam Province

Area
  - Total: 414 sq mi (1,073 km^{2})

Population (2019 census)
  - Total: 103,266
  - Density: 249.3/sq mi (96.24/km^{2})
- Time zone: UTC+0 (GMT 0)

Bourzanga is a department of Bam Province in northern-central Burkina Faso. Its capital lies at Bourzanga town. According to the 2019 census the commune has a population of 103,266.

== Towns and villages ==
- Bourzanga (7 088 inhabitants) (capital)
- Abra (884 inhabitants)
- Alamanini (704 inhabitants)
- Alga (1 328 inhabitants)
- Alga-Fulbé (237 inhabitants)
- Bani (1 853 inhabitants)
- Bassé (2 138 inhabitants)
- Bassé-Fulbé (571 inhabitants)
- Bondé (409 inhabitants)
- Bonga (438 inhabitants)
- Bolkiba (287 inhabitants)
- Boulounga (2 296 inhabitants)
- Diagadéré (297 inhabitants)
- Doundégué (371 inhabitants)
- Felenga (428 inhabitants)
- Felenga Fulbé (513 inhabitants)
- Fétorané (380 inhabitants)
- Kiéké (831 inhabitants)
- Kièka Fulbé (125 inhabitants)
- Kourao (1 500 inhabitants)
- Maléoualé (793 inhabitants)
- Mawarida (225 inhabitants)
- Nafo (1 650 inhabitants)
- Namassa (233 inhabitants)
- Namssiguia (2 776 inhabitants)
- Napalgue (1 293 inhabitants)
- Nioumbila (1 725 inhabitants)
- Ouemtenga (259 inhabitants)
- Pissélé (1 026 inhabitants)
- Sam (2 060 inhabitants)
- Sam-Fulbé (467 inhabitants)
- Sanare (680 inhabitants)
- Selnore (1 628 inhabitants)
- Selnoré-Fulbé (47 inhabitants)
- Singtenga (831 inhabitants)
- Tabaongo (641 inhabitants)
- Tebera (968 inhabitants)
- Zana (1 620 inhabitants)
- Zana Mogo (976 inhabitants)
- Zomkalga (841 inhabitants)
- Zon (1 620 inhabitants)
