= Boulounga =

Village in Bourzanga Department, Burkina Faso

- Location in Burkina Faso
- Coordinates: 13°36′N 1°34′W
- Country: Burkina Faso
- Region: Centre-Nord Region
- Province: Bam Province
- Department: Bourzanga Department

Population (2019)
  - Total: 3,791
- Time zone: UTC+0 (GMT 0)

Boulounga is a town in the Bourzanga Department of Bam Province in northern Burkina Faso.

Population
Year	Pop.	±%
1985	1,180	—
2006	2,316	+96.3%
2019	3,791	+63.7%
