= Namassa =

Village in Bourzanga Department, Burkina Faso

- Location in Burkina Faso
- Coordinates: 13°47′13″N 1°31′17″W
- Country: Burkina Faso
- Region: Centre-Nord Region
- Province: Bam Province
- Department: Bourzanga Department

Population (2019)
  - Total: 427
- Time zone: UTC+0 (GMT 0)

Namassa is a village in the Bourzanga Department of Bam Province in northern Burkina Faso.

Population
Year	Pop.	±%
2006	245	—
2019 (estimate)	427	+74.3%
