= Napalgue =

Village in Bourzanga Department, Burkina Faso

- Location in Burkina Faso
- Coordinates: 13°40′N 1°34′W
- Country: Burkina Faso
- Region: Centre-Nord Region
- Province: Bam Province
- Department: Bourzanga Department

Population (2019)
  - Total: 2,546
- Time zone: UTC+0 (GMT 0)

Napalgue is a town in the Bourzanga Department of Bam Province in northern Burkina Faso.

Population
Year	Pop.	±%
1985	693	—
2006	1,395	+101.3%
2019	2,546	+82.5%
