= Bondé =

Village in Bourzanga Department, Burkina Faso

- Location in Burkina Faso
- Coordinates: 13°36′N 1°29′W
- Country: Burkina Faso
- Region: Centre-Nord Region
- Province: Bam Province
- Department: Bourzanga Department

Population (2019)
  - Total: 942
- Time zone: UTC+0 (GMT 0)

Bondé is a village in the Bourzanga Department of Bam Province in northern Burkina Faso.

Population
Year	Pop.	±%
1985	253	—
2006	542	+114.2%
2019 (estimate)	942	+73.8%
