= Pissélé =

Village in Bourzanga Department, Burkina Faso

- Location in Burkina Faso
- Coordinates: 13°42′N 1°29′W
- Country: Burkina Faso
- Region: Centre-Nord Region
- Province: Bam Province
- Department: Bourzanga Department

Population (2019)
  - Total: 1,849
- Time zone: UTC+0 (GMT 0)

Pissélé is a town in the Bourzanga Department of Bam Province in northern Burkina Faso.

Population
Year	Pop.	±%
1985	651	—
2006	1,064	+63.4%
2019 (estimate)	1,849	+73.8%
