= Alamanini =

Village in Bourzanga Department, Burkina Faso

- Location in Burkina Faso
- Coordinates: 13°52′36″N 1°33′57″W
- Country: Burkina Faso
- Region: Centre-Nord Region
- Province: Bam Province
- Department: Bourzanga Department

Population (2019)
  - Total: 1,390

Alamanini or Alamini is a village in the Bourzanga Department of Bam Province in northern Burkina Faso.

Population
Year	Pop.	±%
1985	424	—
2006	800	+88.7%
2019 (estimate)	1,390	+73.8%
