= Bassé-Fulbé =

- Country: Burkina Faso
- Region: Centre-Nord Region
- Province: Bam Province
- Department: Bourzanga Department

Population (2019)
  - Total: 1,232
- Time zone: UTC+0 (GMT 0)

Bassé-Fulbé is a village in the Bourzanga Department of Bam Province in northern Burkina Faso.

Population
Year	Pop.	±%
1985	339	—
2006	709	+109.1%
2019 (estimate)	1,232	+73.8%
