= Sam-Fulbé =

Village in Bourzanga Department, Burkina Faso

- Country: Burkina Faso
- Region: Centre-Nord Region
- Province: Bam Province
- Department: Bourzanga Department

Population (2019)
  - Total: 754
- Time zone: UTC+0 (GMT 0)

Sam-Fulbé is a village in the Bourzanga Department of Bam Province in northern Burkina Faso.

Population
| Year | Pop. | ±% |
|---|---|---|
| 1985 | 266 | — |
| 2006 | 434 | +63.2% |
| 2019 (estimate) | 754 | +73.7% |
