= Singtenga =

Village in Bourzanga Department, Burkina Faso

Singtenga Sigtenga
- Location in Burkina Faso
- Coordinates: 13°37′N 1°29′W
- Country: Burkina Faso
- Region: Centre-Nord Region
- Province: Bam Province
- Department: Bourzanga Department

Population (2019)
  - Total: 1,599
- Time zone: UTC+0 (GMT 0)

Singtenga is a village in the Bourzanga Department of Bam Province in northern Burkina Faso.

Population
Year	Pop.	±%
1985	408	—
2006	901	+120.8%
2019 (estimate)	1,566	+73.8%
