= Sam, Bourzanga =

Village in Bourzanga Department, Burkina Faso

Sam
- Location in Burkina Faso
- Coordinates: 13°39′N 1°24′W
- Country: Burkina Faso
- Region: Centre-Nord Region
- Province: Bam Province
- Department: Bourzanga Department

Population (2019)
  - Total: 3,891
- Time zone: UTC+0 (GMT 0)

Sam is a town in the Bourzanga Department of Bam Province in northern Burkina Faso.

Population
Year	Pop.	±%
1985	1,316	—
2006	2,239	+70.1%
2019 (estimate)	3,891	+73.8%
