= Bani, Bourzanga =

Village in Bourzanga Department, Burkina Faso

Bani
- Nickname: panchi
- Location in Burkina Faso
- Coordinates: 13°38′31″N 1°29′34″W
- Country: Burkina Faso
- Region: Centre-Nord Region
- Province: Bam Province
- Department: Bourzanga Department

Population (2019)
  - Total: 3,328
- Time zone: UTC+0 (GMT 0)

Bani is a village in the Bourzanga Department of Bam Province in northern Burkina Faso.

Population
Year	Pop.	±%
1985	1,022	—
2006	1,915	+87.4%
2019 (estimate)	3,328	+73.8%
