= Bonga, Burkina Faso =

Village in Bourzanga Department, Burkina Faso

- Country: Burkina Faso
- Region: Centre-Nord Region
- Province: Bam Province
- Department: Bourzanga Department

Population (2019)
  - Total: 958
- Time zone: UTC+0 (GMT 0)

Bonga, Burkina Faso is a village in the Bourzanga Department of Bam Province in northern Burkina Faso.

Population
Year	Pop.	±%
2006	551	—
2019 (estimate)	958	+73.9%
