= Vladimir Tanurcov =

Moldovan footballer

Personal information
- Date of birth: 27 November 1977 (age 48)
- Place of birth: Leova, Moldova
- Height: 1.81 m (5 ft 11 1/2 in)
- Position: Midfielder

Team information
- Current team: Salsåker-Ullångers IF

Senior career*
Years	Team	Apps	(Gls)
?	FC Unisport-Auto Chişinău		
2005–2006	Yverdon-Sport FC		
2006	FC Champagne		
2006–	FC Zimbru Chișinău		

International career^{‡}
2000–2001	Moldova	6	(0)
- * Club domestic league appearances and goals ‡ National team caps and goals as of 24 November 2013

Vladimir Tanurcov (born 27 November 1977) is a Moldovan footballer currently playing for FC Zimbru Chișinău.
