= Sanar-e Sofla =

Sanar-e Sofla سنار سفلی
- Village
- Location within Iran
- Coordinates: 36°30′18″N 51°17′39″E
- Country: Iran
- Province: Mazandaran
- County: Chalus
- Bakhsh: Marzanabad
- Rural District: Birun Bashm

Population (2016)
  - Total: 71
- Time zone: UTC+3:30 (IRST)

Sanar-e Sofla (Persian: سنار سفلی, also Romanized as Sanār-e Soflá; also known as Sanār-e Pā’īn) is a village in Birun Bashm Rural District, Marzanabad District, Chalus County, Mazandaran Province, Iran. At the 2016 census, its population was 71, in 43 families. Decreased from 195 people in 2006.
