= Alga-Fulbé =

Village in Bourzanga Department, Burkina Faso

- Country: Burkina Faso
- Region: Centre-Nord Region
- Province: Bam Province
- Department: Bourzanga Department

Population (2019)
  - Total: 936

Alga-Fulbé is a village in the Bourzanga Department of Bam Province in northern Burkina Faso.

Population
Year	Pop.	±%
1985	271	—
2006	261	−3.7%
2019	936	+258.6%
