= Ben Idrissa Dermé =

Burkinabe footballer (1982–2016)

- Dermé with CA Bastia

Personal information
- Date of birth: 21 January 1982
- Place of birth: Abra, Republic of Upper Volta
- Date of death: 11 September 2016 (aged 34)
- Place of death: Biguglia, France
- Height: 1.79 m (5 ft 10 in)
- Position: Centre back

Senior career*
Years	Team	Apps	(Gls)
2003–2004	Étoile Filante		
2004–2008	Sheriff Tiraspol	59	(4)
2008–2009	US Ouagadougou		
2009–2010	USC Corte		
2010–2014	CA Bastia	83	(5)
2014–2016	ÉF Bastia		
2016	AJ Biguglia		
Total		142	(9)

International career
2006–2010	Burkina Faso	3	(0)
- * Club domestic league appearances and goals

Ben Idrissa Dermé (21 January 1982 – 11 September 2016) was a Burkinabé professional footballer who played as a centre back.

== Career ==
Born in Abra, Dermé played club football in Burkino Faso, Moldova, and France for Étoile Filante, Sheriff Tiraspol, US Ouagadougou, USC Corte, CA Bastia, ÉF Bastia and AJ Biguglia.

He earned three caps for the Burkina Faso national team between 2006 and 2010.

Dermé died on 11 September 2016 following a heart attack during a 2016–17 Coupe de France match.
