= Sanare, Burkina Faso =

Village in Bourzanga Department, Burkina Faso

Sanare
- Location in Burkina Faso
- Coordinates: 13°37′N 1°22′W
- Country: Burkina Faso
- Region: Centre-Nord Region
- Province: Bam Province
- Department: Bourzanga Department

Population (2019)
  - Total: 1,258
- Time zone: UTC+0 (GMT 0)

Sanare is a village in the Bourzanga Department of Bam Province in northern Burkina Faso.

Population
Year	Pop.	±%
1985	277	—
2006	724	+161.4%
2019 (estimate)	1,258	+73.8%
