= Ouemtenga =

Village in Bourzanga Department, Burkina Faso

Ouemtenga Wembatenga
- Location in Burkina Faso
- Coordinates: 13°38′10″N 1°32′31″W
- Country: Burkina Faso
- Region: Centre-Nord Region
- Province: Bam Province
- Department: Bourzanga Department

Population (2019)
  - Total: 605
- Time zone: UTC+0 (GMT 0)

Ouemtenga is a village in the Bourzanga Department of Bam Province in northern Burkina Faso.

Population
Year	Pop.	±%
1985	147	—
2006	348	+136.7%
2019 (estimate)	605	+73.9%
