= Napo =

Napo or NAPO may refer to:

== Organizations ==
- Napo (trade union), a UK trade union that represents probation officers and CAFCASS reporters
- Novosibirsk Aircraft Production Association, an aircraft production company in Russia
- National Association of Police Organizations, US umbrella lobbying organization of police officers and officers associations

== Places ==
- Napo County (那坡县), Baise, Guangxi, China
- Napo River, a tributary to the Amazon River that rises in Ecuador
- Napo Province, a province in Ecuador
- Napo District, a district of Maynas, Peru

== Other ==
- Napoleon Bonaparte (1769–1821), French military and political leader
- Pizza a la napolitana, an Argentine dish
