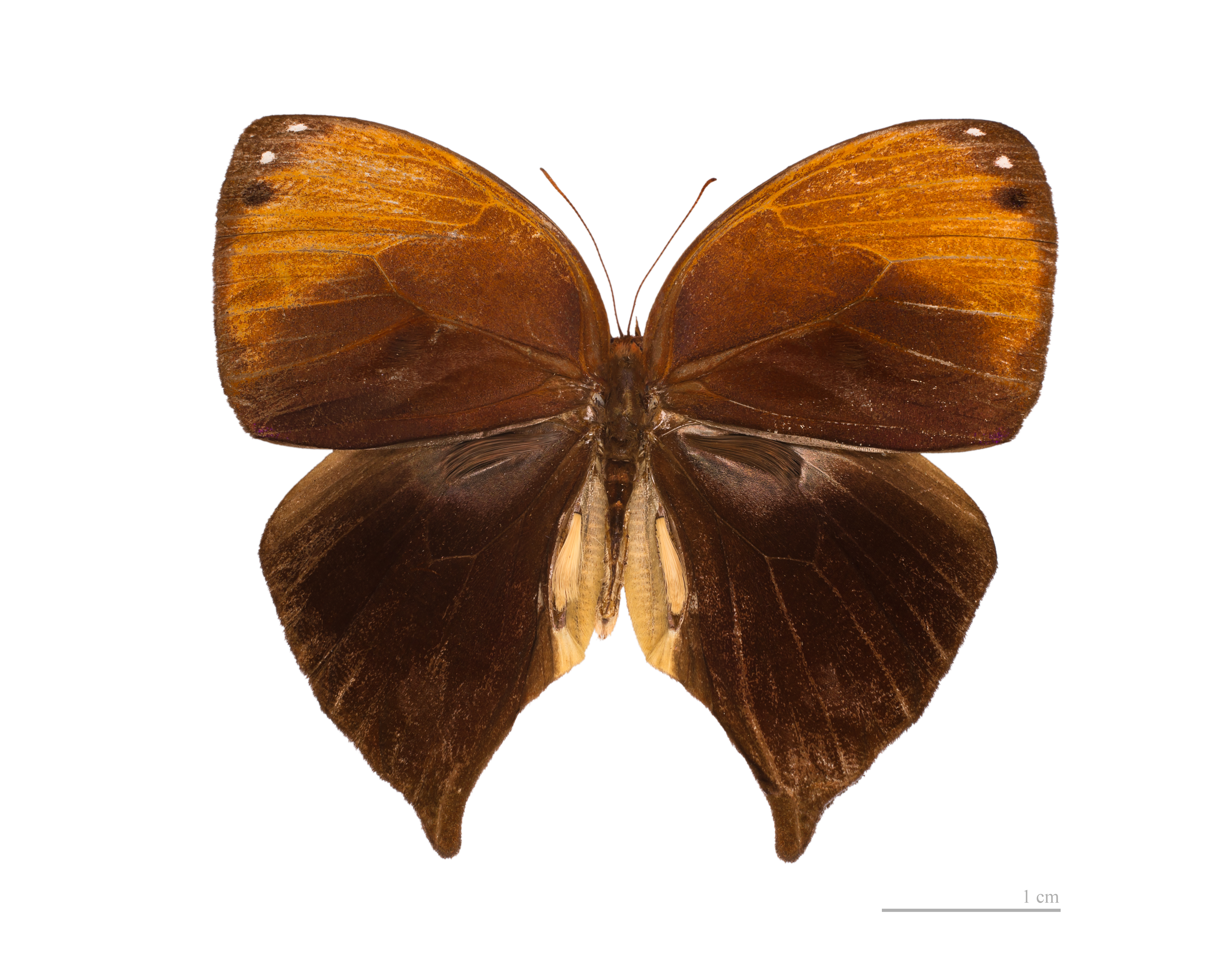

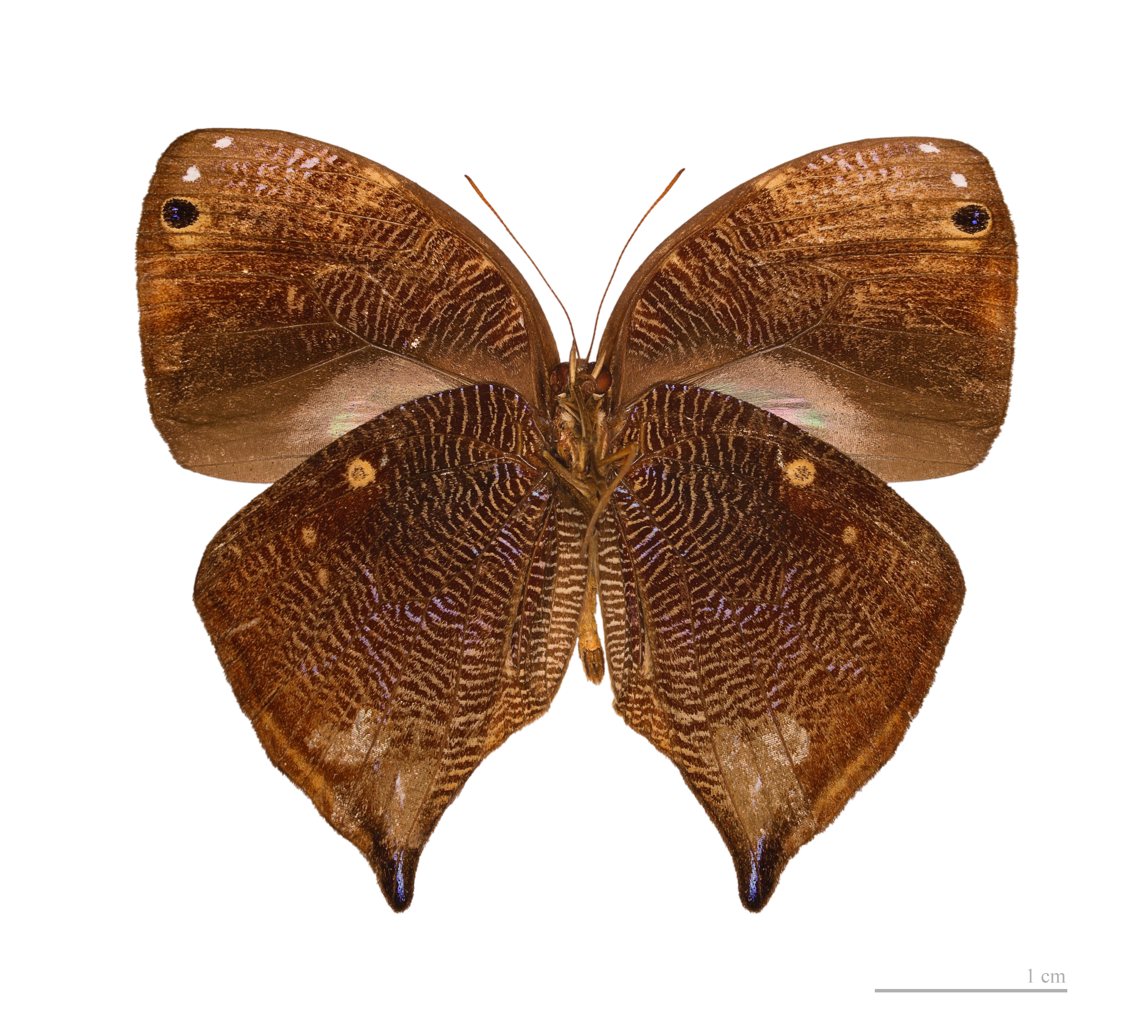
- Upper and underside of mounted specimens (nominate subspecies)

Scientific classification
- Kingdom: Animalia
- Phylum: Arthropoda
- Clade: Pancrustacea
- Class: Insecta
- Order: Lepidoptera
- Family: Nymphalidae
- Genus: Bia
- Species: B. actorion

Binomial name
- Bia actorion (Stoll, 1780)

Synonyms
- Papilio actorion Linnaeus, 1763; Bia actoriaena Hübner, [1819]; Napho actoriaena

= Bia actorion =

Uncertain owlet

Species of butterfly

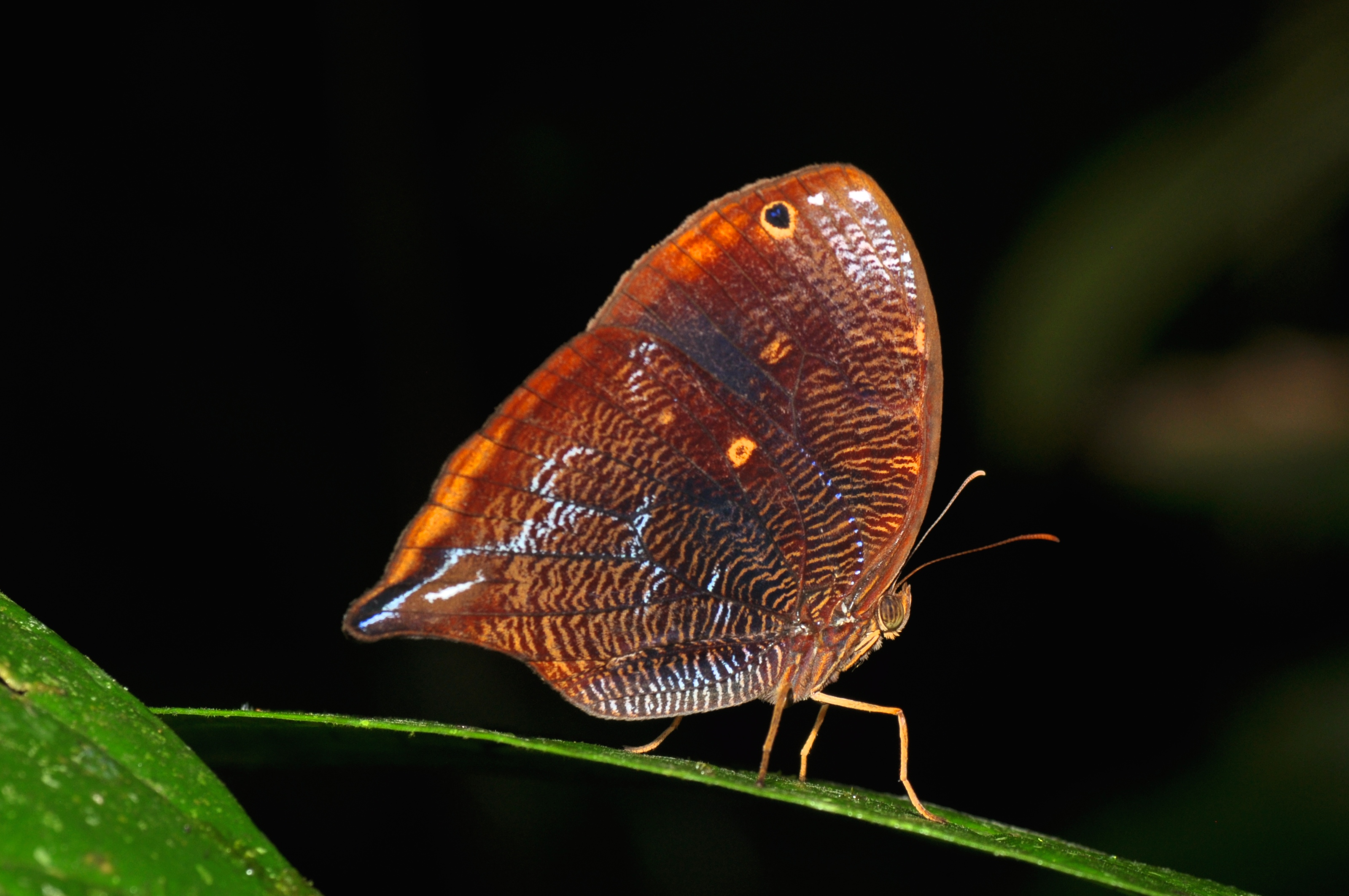
In eastern Ecuador, showing the vermiculation on the underwings

Bia actorion, the uncertain owlet, bia owl or Actorion owlet, is a species of butterfly of the family Nymphalidae. It is found in the upper Amazon areas of Brazil, Ecuador, Peru and Bolivia.

Bia actorion is a large brown butterfly with a very pointed anal angle on the hindwings. It has a dark eyespot on the forewings in a submarginal position at e5, more visible on the underside.

The larvae feed on Astrocaryum murumuru and Geonoma species.

== Taxonomy ==
Bia actorion has long been placed in the subfamily Satyrinae, but studies determined that it belonged to the Brassolinae. Currently, the genus Bia are classified as members of the subtribe Biina in the tribe Brassolini.

== Subspecies ==
- Bia actorion actorion
- Bia actorion decaerulea Weymer, 1911 — Amazonas in Brazil
- Bia actorion rebeli Bryk, 1953 — Ecuador and Peru
