= Alga, Burkina Faso =

Village in Bourzanga Department, Burkina Faso

Alga
- Interactive map of Alga
- Coordinates: 13°36′42″N 1°32′31″W
- Country: Burkina Faso
- Region: Centre-Nord Region
- Province: Bam Province
- Department: Bourzanga Department

Population (2019)
  - Total: 2,478

Alga is a town in the Bourzanga Department of Bam Province in northern Burkina Faso.

Population
Year	Pop.	±%
1985	585	—
2006	1,426	+143.8%
2019 (estimate)	2,478	+73.8%
