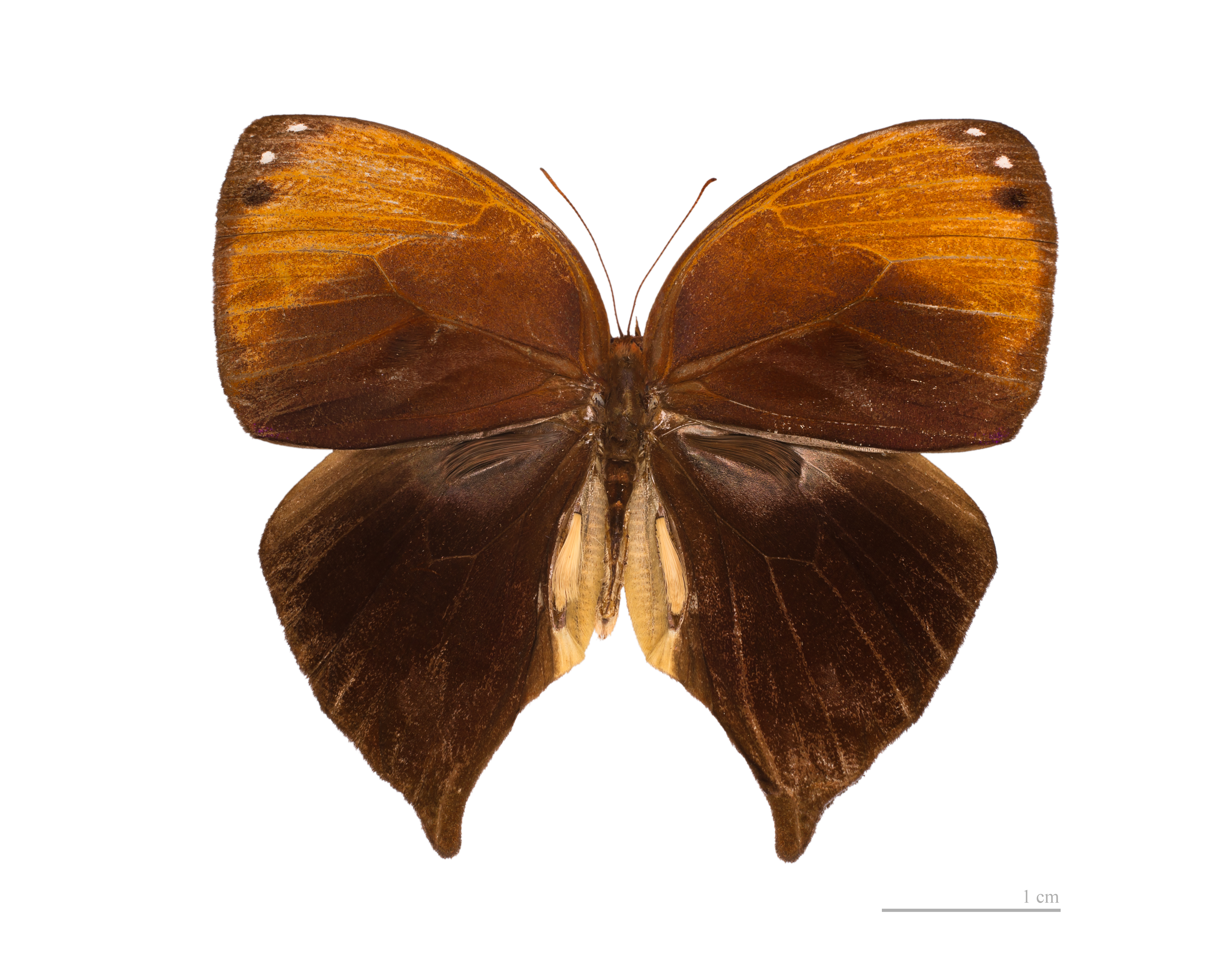
- Bia actorion actorion

Scientific classification
- Kingdom: Animalia
- Phylum: Arthropoda
- Class: Insecta
- Order: Lepidoptera
- Family: Nymphalidae
- Tribe: Brassolini
- Genus: Bia; Hübner, [1819]

Species
- See text

Synonyms
- Napho Hewitson, [1849]

= Bia (butterfly) =

Genus of brush-footed butterflies

Bia is a Neotropical genus of butterflies, named by Jacob Hübner in 1819. They are in the brush-footed butterfly family, Nymphalidae.

== Species ==
Arranged alphabetically.

- Bia actorion (Linnaeus, 1763)
- Bia peruana Röber, 1904

Note- This genus has been revised by Penz et.al. 2017 and now includes more species partly due to rank changes.See Wikispecies.
