= Sanar-e Olya =

Sanar-e Olya سنارعليا
- Village
- Location within Iran
- Coordinates: 36°30′39″N 51°17′26″E
- Country: Iran
- Province: Mazandaran
- County: Chalus
- Bakhsh: Marzanabad
- Rural District: Birun Bashm

Population (2006)
  - Total: 133
- Time zone: UTC+3:30 (IRST)

Sanar-e Olya (Persian: سنارعليا, also Romanized as Sanār-e ‘Olyā; also known as Sanār-e Bālā) is a village in Birun Bashm Rural District, Marzanabad District, Chalus County, Mazandaran Province, Iran. At the 2016 census, its population was 133, in 46 families.
