= Algae (disambiguation) =

Algae are a type of Protist.

Algae may also refer to:

- Algae fuel, a biofuel
- Algae eaters, species that feed on algae
- Snow algae, cold-tolerant species of algae
- Ice algae, algae that live in sea ice
- AlgaeBase, a database of algae
- Algae Lake, lake in Antarctica

== See also ==
- Algos
- National Algae Association, a US trade organization for renewable energy
