= Evgheni Ivanov =

Moldovan footballer

Personal information
- Full name: Evgheni Gennadyevich Ivanov
- Date of birth: 21 June 1966 (age 60)
- Position: Goalkeeper

Senior career*
Years	Team	Apps	(Gls)
- FC Zhetysu
- FC Tighina
- FC Bujak Komrat
1991–1992	FC Samtredia		
1992–1998	Tiligul Tiraspol		
1998	FC Moldova-Gaz Chișinău		
1998–2000	FC Sheriff Tiraspol		
2001	FC Nistru Otaci		
- Tiligul Tiraspol

International career
1994–1998	Moldova	7	(0)

Managerial career
- 2006, 2009, 2016: Moldova national football team (goalkeeping coach)
- 2008–2011: FC Sheriff Tiraspol (goalkeeping coach)
- 2014–2015: Lokomotiv Moskva (goalkeeping coach)
- 2020–2023: FC Dinamo Minsk (goalkeeping coach)
- 2024–: FC Sheriff Tiraspol (goalkeeping coach)
- * Club domestic league appearances and goals

Evgheni Gennadyevich Ivanov (Russian: Евгений Геннадьевич Иванов; born 21 June 1966) is a retired Moldovan football goalkeeper.

His sons Vladislav (born 1990) and Stanislav (born 1996) have also become football players.
