= AlGa =

Alloy formed with gallium and aluminium

AlGa (Aluminium-Gallium) is a degenerate alloy that results from liquid gallium infiltrating the crystal structure of aluminium metal. The resulting alloy is very weak and brittle, being broken under very little pressure. The alloy is also chemically weaker, as the gallium inhibits the aluminium from forming a protective oxide layer.

== Uses ==
The alloy can be reacted with water to form hydrogen gas (H_{2}), aluminium hydroxide and gallium metal. Normally, aluminium does not react with water, since it quickly reacts in air to form a passivation layer of aluminium oxide. AlGa alloy is able to create aluminium nanoparticles for the hydrogen producing reaction. Since this reaction forms hydrogen gas, it can be used as a source of fuel or simply as a hydrogen gas generator. This reaction can also be used to produce aluminium oxide from aluminium. As previously mentioned, aluminium normally will not react with water or air due to the presence of a protective passivation layer, but the reaction of suspended aluminium with water can effectively oxidize aluminum to form aluminium hydroxide which can then be heated to about 180 °C (356 °F), where it decomposes to produce aluminium oxide and water vapor.

== Safety concerns ==
Due to AlGa's extreme lack of structural integrity and inability to form a protective oxide layer, gallium metal is considered to be corrosive. If AlGa were to form on an aluminium structure, the aforementioned structure could weaken or collapse. Gallium is subject to strict packaging requirements for transportation by aircraft as it could compromise the integrity of the aluminium hull.
