= List of twin towns and sister cities in France =

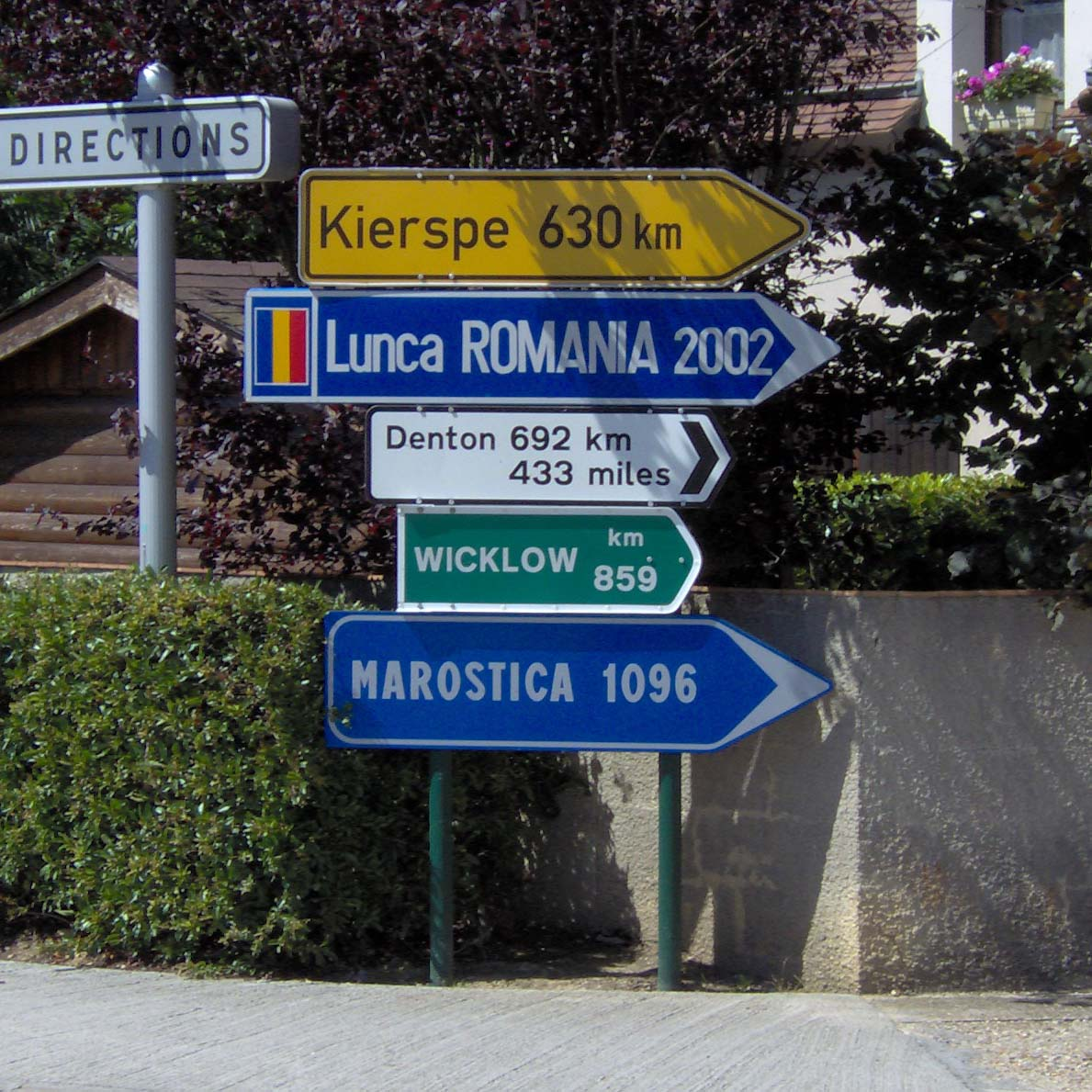
Twin towns of Montigny-le-Bretonneux

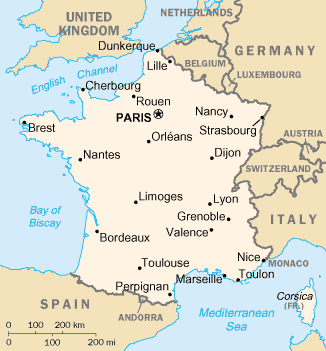
Map of France

This is a list of municipalities in France which have standing links to local communities in other countries known as "town twinning" (usually in Europe) or "sister cities" (usually in the rest of the world).

== A ==
=== Ab–Am ===
Abbeville

- Argos, Greece
- Burgess Hill, England, United Kingdom

Achères

- Amarante, Portugal
- Großkrotzenburg, Germany
- Stonehaven, Scotland, United Kingdom

Agen

- Corpus Christi, United States
- Dinslaken, Germany
- Llanelli, Wales, United Kingdom
- Toledo, Spain

L'Aigle

- Aigle, Switzerland
- Clausthal-Zellerfeld, Germany
- Spišská Nová Ves, Slovakia

Aix-en-Provence

- Ashkelon, Israel
- Bath, England, United Kingdom
- Carthage, Tunisia
- Coimbra, Portugal
- Granada, Spain
- Perugia, Italy
- Tübingen, Germany

Aix-les-Bains

- Milena, Italy
- Moulay Yacoub, Morocco
- Zhangjiajie, China

Ajaccio

- La Maddalena, Italy

Albi

- Girona, Spain
- Palo Alto, United States
- Randwick, Australia

Alençon

- Basingstoke and Deane, England, United Kingdom
- Quakenbrück, Germany

Alès

- Kilmarnock, Scotland, United Kingdom

Alfortville

- El Biar, Algeria
- Cantanhede, Portugal
- Oshakan, Armenia
- San Benedetto del Tronto, Italy

Allauch

- Armavir, Armenia
- Kadima-Zoran, Israel
- Vaterstetten, Germany
- Vico Equense, Italy

Ambérieu-en-Bugey

- Mering, Germany

Amiens

- Darlington, England, United Kingdom
- Dortmund, Germany
- Görlitz, Germany
- Tulsa, United States

=== An ===
Andernos-les-Bains

- Largs, Scotland, United Kingdom
- Nußloch, Germany
- Segorbe, Spain

Andrésy

- Haren, Germany
- Międzyrzecz, Poland
- Oundle, England, United Kingdom
- Westerwolde, Netherlands

Angers

- Austin, United States
- Bamako, Mali
- Haarlem, Netherlands
- Osnabrück, Germany
- Pisa, Italy
- Södertälje, Sweden
- Toruń, Poland
- Wigan, England, United Kingdom
- Yantai, China

Anglet

- Ansbach, Germany

Angoulême

- Bury, England, United Kingdom
- Chaves, Portugal
- Gelendzhik, Russia
- Hildesheim, Germany
- Hoffman Estates, United States
- Saguenay, Canada
- Ségou, Mali
- Turda, Romania
- Vitoria-Gasteiz, Spain

Aniche

- Bobingen, Germany
- Nový Bor, Czech Republic

Annecy

- Bayreuth, Germany
- Cheltenham, England, United Kingdom
- Liptovský Mikuláš, Slovakia
- Sainte-Thérèse, Canada
- Vicenza, Italy

Annemasse

- Gaggenau, Germany
- Sieradz, Poland

Annonay

- Backnang, Germany
- Barge, Italy
- Chelmsford, England, United Kingdom

Anor

- Aken, Germany
- Gizałki, Poland
- Momignies, Belgium
- Příbram, Czech Republic

Antibes

- Aalborg, Denmark
- Desenzano del Garda, Italy
- Eilat, Israel
- Kinsale, Ireland
- Krasnogorsk, Russia
- Newport Beach, United States
- Olympia, Greece
- Schwäbisch Gmünd, Germany

Antony

- Antelias, Lebanon
- Collegno, Italy
- Davtashen (Yerevan), Armenia
- Eleftheroupoli, Greece
- Hammam-Lif, Tunisia
- Lewisham, England, United Kingdom
- Lexington, United States
- Olomouc, Czech Republic
- Protvino, Russia
- Reinickendorf (Berlin), Germany
- Sderot, Israel

=== Ap–Av ===
Apt

- Bakel, Senegal
- Boussu, Belgium
- Thiene, Italy

Argentan

- Abingdon-on-Thames, England, United Kingdom
- Baja, Hungary
- Rotenburg an der Fulda, Germany

Argenteuil

- Alessandria, Italy
- Dessau-Roßlau, Germany
- Hunedoara, Romania
- West Dunbartonshire, Scotland, United Kingdom

Arles

- Fulda, Germany
- Jerez de la Frontera, Spain
- Kalymnos, Greece
- Pskov, Russia
- Sagne, Mauritania
- Vercelli, Italy
- Verviers, Belgium
- Wisbech, England, United Kingdom
- York, United States

Armentières

- Litoměřice, Czech Republic
- Osterode am Harz, Germany
- Stalybridge, England, United Kingdom

Arras

- Deva, Romania
- Herten, Germany
- Ipswich, England, United Kingdom
- Oudenaarde, Belgium

Asnières-sur-Seine

- Spandau (Berlin), Germany
- Stockton-on-Tees, England, United Kingdom

Athis-Mons

- Ballina, Ireland
- Rothenburg ob der Tauber, Germany
- Sinaia, Romania

Aubagne

- Argentona, Spain

Aubenas

- Cesenatico, Italy
- Schwarzenbek, Germany
- Sierre, Switzerland
- Zelzate, Belgium

Aubergenville

- Alcobaça, Portugal
- Bełchatów, Poland
- Dieburg, Germany
- Horndean, England, United Kingdom

Aubervilliers

- Beit Jala, Palestine
- Jena, Germany

Aubière

- Grevenmacher, Luxembourg
- Sperlonga, Italy

Aubigny-sur-Nère

- Haddington, Scotland, United Kingdom
- Oxford, United States
- Plopana, Romania
- Vlotho, Germany

Auch

- Calatayud, Spain
- Memmingen, Germany

Aurillac

- Altea, Spain
- Bassetlaw, England, United Kingdom
- Bocholt, Germany
- Bougouni, Mali
- Vorona, Romania

Autun

- Arévalo, Spain
- Ingelheim am Rhein, Germany
- Kawagoe, Japan
- Stevenage, England, United Kingdom

Auxerre

- Greve in Chianti, Italy
- Płock, Poland
- Redditch, England, United Kingdom
- Roscoff, France
- Saint-Amarin, France
- Worms, Germany

Avignon

- Bao'an (Shenzhen), China
- Colchester, England, United Kingdom
- Diourbel, Senegal
- Siena, Italy
- Tarragona, Spain
- Tortosa, Spain
- Wetzlar, Germany

== B ==
=== Ba ===
Bagnères-de-Bigorre

- Alhama de Granada, Spain
- Granarolo dell'Emilia, Italy
- Inverurie, Scotland, United Kingdom
- Malvern, England, United Kingdom
- Tutzing, Germany

Bagneux

- Circoscrizione 6 (Turin), Italy
- Grand-Bourg, Guadeloupe, France
- Vanadzor, Armenia

Bagnolet

- Akbou, Algeria
- Massala, Mali
- Oranienburg, Germany
- Le Robert, Martinique, France
- Shatila, Lebanon
- Sesto Fiorentino, Italy

Bagnols-sur-Cèze

- Braunfels, Germany
- Carcaixent, Spain
- Eeklo, Belgium
- Feltre, Italy
- Kiskunfélegyháza, Hungary
- Newbury, England, United Kingdom

Bailleul

- Hawick, Scotland, United Kingdom
- Izegem, Belgium
- Kyritz, Germany
- Wałcz, Poland
- Werne, Germany

Bar-le-Duc

- Griesheim, Germany
- Gyönk, Hungary
- Wilkau-Haßlau, Germany

Bastia

- Erding, Germany
- Viareggio, Italy

La Baule-Escoublac

- Homburg, Germany
- Inverness, Scotland, United Kingdom
- Vila Real de Santo António, Portugal

Bayeux

- Chojnice, Poland
- Dorchester, England, United Kingdom
- Eindhoven, Netherlands
- Lübbecke, Germany
- Voss, Norway

=== Be–Bl ===
Beaune

- Bensheim, Germany
- Castellammare del Golfo, Italy
- Kōshū, Japan
- Krems an der Donau, Austria
- Malmedy, Belgium
- Nantucket, United States

Beaupréau-en-Mauges

- Abergavenny, Wales, United Kingdom
- Coaticook, Canada
- Feldkirchen-Westerham, Germany
- Münsingen, Germany
- Posești, Romania

Beauvais

- Dej, Romania
- Maidstone, England, United Kingdom
- Setúbal, Portugal
- Tczew, Poland
- Witten, Germany

Bègles

- Bray, Ireland
- Collado Villalba, Spain
- Suhl, Germany

Belfort

- Delémont, Switzerland
- Leonberg, Germany
- Stafford, England, United Kingdom
- Zaporizhzhia, Ukraine

Berck

- Bad Honnef, Germany
- Hythe, England, United Kingdom

Bergerac

- Faenza, Italy
- Hohen Neuendorf, Germany
- Kenitra, Morocco
- Ostrów Wielkopolski, Poland
- Repentigny, Canada

Besançon

- Bielsko-Biała, Poland
- Bistriţa, Romania
- Charlottesville, United States
- Douroula, Burkina Faso
- Freiburg im Breisgau, Germany
- Hadera, Israel
- Kirklees, England, United Kingdom
- Kuopio, Finland
- Man, Ivory Coast
- Matsumae, Japan
- Neuchâtel, Switzerland
- Pavia, Italy
- Tver, Russia

Béziers

- Chiclana de la Frontera, Spain
- Chortkiv, Ukraine
- Heilbronn, Germany
- Maaloula, Syria
- Stavropol, Russia
- Stockport, England, United Kingdom
- Tainan, Taiwan

Bezons

- Downpatrick, Northern Ireland, United Kingdom
- Szekszárd, Hungary

Biarritz

- Augusta, United States
- Cascais, Portugal
- Ixelles, Belgium
- Jerez de la Frontera, Spain
- Santa Cruz, United States
- Zaragoza, Spain

Bischwiller

- Hornberg, Germany
- Zgierz, Poland

Blagnac

- Buxtehude, Germany

Le Blanc-Mesnil

- Beni Douala, Algeria
- Debre Berhan, Ethiopia
- Petergof, Russia
- San Giorgio Albanese, Italy
- Sandwell, England, United Kingdom

Blois

- Cáceres, Spain
- Lewes, England, United Kingdom
- Sighişoara, Romania
- Urbino, Italy
- Waldshut-Tiengen, Germany
- Weimar, Germany

=== Bo ===
Bobigny

- Potsdam, Germany

Bois-Colombes

- Neu-Ulm, Germany

Bois-Guillaume

- Baix Camp, Spain
- Kegworth, England, United Kingdom
- Szemud, Poland
- Tikaré, Burkina Faso
- Torgiano, Italy
- Uelzen, Germany
- Wejherowo County, Poland

Bondoufle

- Nörten-Hardenberg, Germany

Bonneville

- Racconigi, Italy
- Staufen im Breisgau, Germany

Bordeaux

- Ashdod, Israel
- Baku, Azerbaijan
- Bamako, Mali
- Bilbao, Spain
- Bristol, England, United Kingdom
- Casablanca, Morocco
- Fukuoka, Japan
- Kraków, Poland
- Lima, Peru
- Los Angeles, United States
- Madrid, Spain
- Munich, Germany
- Oran, Algeria
- Ouagadougou, Burkina Faso
- Porto, Portugal
- Quebec City, Canada
- Ramallah, Palestine
- Riga, Latvia
- Saint Petersburg, Russia
- Wuhan, China

Boulogne-Billancourt

- Anderlecht, Belgium
- Guang'an, China
- Hammersmith and Fulham, England, United Kingdom
- Irving, United States
- Marino, Italy
- Neukölln (Berlin), Germany
- Pančevo, Serbia
- Ra'anana, Israel
- Sousse, Tunisia
- Zaanstad, Netherlands

Boulogne-sur-Mer

- Folkestone, England, United Kingdom
- La Plata, Argentina
- Safi, Morocco
- Zweibrücken, Germany

Bourges

- Augsburg, Germany
- Aveiro, Portugal
- Forlì, Italy
- Koszalin, Poland
- Palencia, Spain
- Peterborough, England, United Kingdom
- Yoshkar-Ola, Russia

Le Bourget

- Amityville, United States
- Cullera, Spain
- Little Falls, United States
- Zhukovsky, Russia

Bourgoin-Jallieu

- Bergisch Gladbach, Germany
- Conselice, Italy
- Dunstable, England, United Kingdom
- Rehau, Germany
- Velsen, Netherlands
- Wujiang (Suzhou), China

Bourg-de-Péage

- East Grinstead, England, United Kingdom
- Mindelheim, Germany
- Sant Feliu de Guíxols, Spain
- Schwaz, Austria
- Verbania, Italy

Bourg-en-Bresse

- Aylesbury, England, United Kingdom
- Bad Kreuznach, Germany
- Brzeg, Poland
- El Kef, Tunisia
- Namur, Belgium
- Parma, Italy
- San Severo, Italy
- Yinchuan, China

Bourg-la-Reine

- Kenilworth, England, United Kingdom
- Monheim am Rhein, Germany
- Reghin, Romania
- Sulejówek, Poland

Le Bouscat

- Arnstadt, Germany
- Glen Ellyn, United States

=== Br–Bu ===
Brest

- Cádiz, Spain
- Constanța, Romania
- Denver, United States
- Dún Laoghaire, Ireland
- Kiel, Germany
- Plymouth, England, United Kingdom
- Taranto, Italy
- Yokosuka, Japan

Bressuire

- Fraserburgh, Scotland, United Kingdom
- Friedberg, Germany
- Hodac, Romania
- Kpalimé, Togo
- Leixlip, Ireland
- Mequinenza, Spain
- Parczew, Poland
- Ryazan, Russia

Brie-Comte-Robert

- Bagnolo Mella, Italy
- Litvínov, Czech Republic
- Olbernhau, Germany
- Stadtbergen, Germany

Brignoles

- Bruneck, Italy
- Groß-Gerau, Germany
- Szamotuły, Poland
- Tielt, Belgium

Brive-la-Gaillarde

- Guimarães, Portugal
- Joliette, Canada
- Lauf an der Pegnitz, Germany
- Melitopol, Ukraine
- Sikasso, Mali

Bron

- Cumbernauld, Scotland, United Kingdom
- Grimma, Germany
- Talavera de la Reina, Spain
- Weingarten, Germany

Bruay-la-Buissière

- Fröndenberg, Germany
- Kédougou, Senegal
- Merbes-le-Château, Belgium
- Olkusz, Poland
- Schwerte, Germany

Bruges

- Leven, Scotland, United Kingdom
- Polanco, Spain
- Umkirch, Germany

Brunoy

- Espinho, Portugal
- Reigate and Banstead, England, United Kingdom
- Wittlich, Germany

Bussy-Saint-Georges

- Kiryat Ekron, Israel
- Meiningen, Germany
- Radcliffe-on-Trent, England, United Kingdom
- San Giuliano Milanese, Italy

== C ==
=== Ca–Ce ===
Cabourg

- Atlantic City, United States
- Bad Homburg vor der Höhe, Germany
- Bromont, Canada
- Chur, Switzerland
- Jūrmala, Latvia
- Mayrhofen, Austria
- Mondorf-les-Bains, Luxembourg
- Oussouye, Senegal
- Salcombe, England, United Kingdom
- Spa, Belgium
- Terracina, Italy

Cachan

- Wolfenbüttel (district), Germany

Caen

- Alexandria, United States
- Anzio, Italy
- Nashville, United States
- Ohrid, North Macedonia
- Portsmouth, England, United Kingdom
- Reșița, Romania
- Thiès, Senegal
- Würzburg, Germany

Cagnes-sur-Mer

- Passau, Germany

Calais

- Bardejov, Slovakia
- Brăila, Romania
- Dover, England, United Kingdom
- Duisburg, Germany
- Wismar, Germany
- Xiangtan, China

Caluire-et-Cuire

- Nichelino, Italy

Cambrai

- Châteauguay, Canada
- Cieszyn, Poland
- Esztergom, Hungary
- Gravesham, England, United Kingdom
- Pushkin, Russia

Cannes

- Acapulco, Mexico
- Beverly Hills, United States
- Kensington and Chelsea, England, United Kingdom
- Sanya, China
- Shizuoka, Japan

Le Cannet

- Benidorm, Spain
- Königstein im Taunus, Germany
- Lafayette, United States
- Magione, Italy
- Vila do Conde, Portugal

Canteleu

- Buchholz in der Nordheide, Germany
- Kongoussi, Burkina Faso
- New Milton, England, United Kingdom
- Wołów, Poland

Carcassonne

- Baeza, Spain
- Eggenfelden, Germany
- Kesklinn (Tallinn), Estonia

Carpentras

- Camaiore, Italy
- Seesen, Germany
- Vevey, Switzerland

Carros

- Grodzisk Mazowiecki, Poland
- San Giustino, Italy

Cavaillon

- Langhirano, Italy
- Weinheim, Germany

La Celle-Saint-Cloud

- Beckum, Germany
- Settat, Morocco

Cenon

- Hartford, United States
- Laredo, Spain
- Meknes, Morocco
- Paredes de Coura, Portugal

Cergy

- Columbia, United States
- West Lancashire, England, United Kingdom

Cesson

- Bababé, Mauritania
- Buchloe, Germany
- Chipping Sodbury, England, United Kingdom
- Vicovu de Sus, Romania

Cesson-Sévigné

- Waltrop, Germany

=== Ch ===
Châlette-sur-Loing

- Dniprovskyi (Kyiv), Ukraine
- Nilüfer, Turkey
- Ponte de Lima, Portugal
- San Antonio de los Baños, Cuba

Châlons-en-Champagne

- Bobo-Dioulasso, Burkina Faso
- Ilkeston, England, United Kingdom
- Mirabel, Canada
- Neuss, Germany
- Razgrad, Bulgaria
- Wittenberge, Germany

Chalon-sur-Saône

- Novara, Italy
- Solingen, Germany
- St Helens, England, United Kingdom

Chamalières

- Geretsried, Germany

Chambéry

- Albstadt, Germany
- Blainville, Canada
- Ouahigouya, Burkina Faso
- Shawinigan, Canada
- Turin, Italy
- Zhangjiakou, China

Chambray-lès-Tours

- Bad Camberg, Germany
- Võru, Estonia

Chamonix-Mont-Blanc

- Aosta, Italy
- Aspen, United States
- Cilaos, Réunion, France
- Courmayeur, Italy
- Davos, Switzerland
- Fujiyoshida, Japan
- Garmisch-Partenkirchen, Germany

Champigny-sur-Marne

- Alpiarça, Portugal
- Bernau bei Berlin, Germany
- Jalapa, Nicaragua
- Musselburgh, Scotland, United Kingdom
- Rosignano Marittimo, Italy

Champs-sur-Marne

- Bradley Stoke, England, United Kingdom
- Quart de Poblet, Spain

Chantepie

- Krško, Slovenia
- Obrigheim, Germany

Charenton-le-Pont

- Borgo Val di Taro, Italy
- Büren, Germany
- Tempelhof-Schöneberg (Berlin), Germany
- Trowbridge, England, United Kingdom
- Zikhron Ya'akov, Israel

Charleville-Mézières

- Dülmen, Germany
- Euskirchen, Germany
- Mantua, Italy
- Nevers, France
- Nordhausen, Germany
- Tolosa, Spain

Chartres

- Bethlehem, Palestine
- Chichester, England, United Kingdom
- Évora, Portugal
- León, Peru
- Ravenna, Italy
- Sakurai, Japan
- Speyer, Germany

Châteaudun

- Arklow, Ireland
- Kroměříž, Czech Republic
- Marchena, Spain
- Schweinfurt, Germany

Châteauroux

- Bittou, Burkina Faso
- Fresno, United States
- Gütersloh, Germany
- Jinhua, China
- Olsztyn, Poland

Château-Thierry

- Cisnădie, Romania
- Grybów (rural gmina), Poland
- Mosbach, Germany
- Pößneck, Germany

Châtellerault

- Bouctouche, Canada
- Castellón de la Plana, Spain
- Corby, England, United Kingdom
- Hamilton, Scotland, United Kingdom
- Kaya, Burkina Faso
- Piła, Poland
- Velbert, Germany

Châtenay-Malabry

- Bergneustadt, Germany
- Bracciano, Italy
- Kos, Greece
- Landsmeer, Netherlands
- Wellington, England, United Kingdom

Châtillon

- Aywaille, Belgium
- Genzano di Roma, Italy
- Merseburg, Germany

Chaumont

- Ashton-under-Lyne, England, United Kingdom
- Bad Nauheim, Germany
- Ivrea, Italy
- Owasso, United States

Chauny

- Andenne, Belgium
- Bergheim, Germany

Chaville

- Alsfeld, Germany
- Barnet, England, United Kingdom
- Settimo Torinese, Italy

Chelles

- Lindau, Germany

Chemillé-en-Anjou

- Aspach, Germany

Chennevières-sur-Marne

- Durmersheim, Germany
- Littlehampton, England, United Kingdom
- Tukums, Latvia

Cherbourg-en-Cotentin

- Allmendingen, Germany
- Bremerhaven, Germany
- Coubalan, Senegal
- Northeim, Germany
- Poole, England, United Kingdom

Le Chesnay

- Heppenheim, Germany

Choisy-le-Roi

- Đống Đa (Hanoi), Vietnam
- Hennigsdorf, Germany
- Lugo, Italy
- Târnova, Romania

Cholet

- Dénia, Spain
- Dorohoi, Romania
- Oldenburg, Germany
- Solihull, England, United Kingdom

=== Ci–Cl ===
La Ciotat

- Bridgwater, England, United Kingdom
- Kranj, Slovenia
- Singen, Germany
- Torre Annunziata, Italy

Cissé is a member of the Charter of European Rural Communities, a town twinning association across the European Union, alongside with:

- Bienvenida, Spain
- Bièvre, Belgium
- Bucine, Italy
- Cashel, Ireland
- Desborough, England, United Kingdom
- Esch (Haaren), Netherlands
- Hepstedt, Germany
- Ibănești, Romania
- Kandava (Tukums), Latvia
- Kannus, Finland
- Kolindros, Greece
- Lassee, Austria
- Medzev, Slovakia
- Næstved, Denmark
- Nagycenk, Hungary
- Nadur, Malta
- Ockelbo, Sweden
- Pano Lefkara, Cyprus
- Põlva, Estonia
- Samuel (Soure), Portugal
- Starý Poddvorov, Czech Republic
- Strzyżów, Poland
- Svoge, Bulgaria
- Tisno, Croatia
- Troisvierges, Luxembourg
- Žagarė (Joniškis), Lithuania

Clamart

- Artashat, Armenia
- Lüneburg, Germany
- Majadahonda, Spain
- Penamacor, Portugal
- Scunthorpe, England, United Kingdom

Les Clayes-sous-Bois

- Ponte da Barca, Portugal
- Röthenbach an der Pegnitz, Germany

Clermont-Ferrand

- Aberdeen, Scotland, United Kingdom
- Braga, Portugal
- Gomel, Belarus
- Norman, United States
- Oviedo, Spain
- Regensburg, Germany
- Salford, England, United Kingdom

Clichy

- Heidenheim an der Brenz, Germany
- Rubí, Spain
- Sankt Pölten, Austria
- Santo Tirso, Portugal
- Southwark, England, United Kingdom

Cluses

- Beaverton, United States
- Trossingen, Germany

=== Co–Cr ===
Cognac

- Boala, Burkina Faso
- Bozhou, China
- Denison, United States
- Königswinter, Germany
- Michalovce, Slovakia
- Perth, Scotland
- Pisco, Peru
- Tovuz, Azerbaijan
- Valdepeñas, Spain
- Vyškov, Czech Republic

Colmar

- Eisenstadt, Austria
- Győr, Hungary
- Lucca, Italy
- Princeton, United States
- Schongau, Germany
- Sint-Niklaas, Belgium
- Vale of White Horse, England, United Kingdom

Colombes

- Frankenthal, Germany

Colomiers

- Victoriaville, Canada

Combs-la-Ville

- Baia Mare, Romania
- Dali, Cyprus
- Duderstadt, Germany
- Oswestry, England, United Kingdom
- Petite-Île, Réunion, France
- R' Kiz, Mauritania
- Salaberry-de-Valleyfield, Canada

Compiègne

- Arona, Italy
- Bury St Edmunds, England, United Kingdom
- Elbląg, Poland
- Guimarães, Portugal
- Huy, Belgium
- Jezzine, Lebanon
- Kiryat Tiv'on, Israel
- Landshut, Germany
- Larache, Morocco
- Raleigh, United States
- Shirakawa, Japan
- Vianden, Luxembourg
- Ziguinchor, Senegal

Concarneau

- Bielefeld, Germany
- M'Bour, Senegal
- Penzance, England, United Kingdom

Conflans-Sainte-Honorine

- Chimay, Belgium
- Hanau, Germany
- Ramsgate, England, United Kingdom

Corbeil-Essonnes

- Alzira, Spain
- Belinho e Mar (Esposende), Portugal
- East Dunbartonshire, Scotland, United Kingdom
- Sindelfingen, Germany

Cormeilles-en-Parisis

- Ware, England, United Kingdom

Couëron

- Fleurus, Belgium
- Wexford, Ireland

Coulaines

- Kitty Hawk, United States
- Kouré, Niger
- Madona, Latvia
- Weyhe, Germany

Courbevoie

- Azov, Russia
- Beit Mery, Lebanon
- Enfield, England, United Kingdom
- Freudenstadt, Germany

La Courneuve

- Ocotal, Nicaragua
- Vitulazio, Italy
- Yako, Burkina Faso

Cournon-d'Auvergne

- Ariccia, Italy
- Lichtenfels, Germany

Creil

- Bethlehem, Palestine
- Chorzów, Poland
- Dakhla, Western Sahara
- Krosno, Poland
- Marl, Germany
- Nabadji Civol, Senegal
- Ouro Sogui, Senegal
- Pendle, England, United Kingdom

Crépy-en-Valois

- Antoing, Belgium
- Płońsk, Poland
- Zell am Mosel, Germany

Créteil

- Les Abymes, Guadeloupe, France
- Falkirk, Scotland, United Kingdom
- Gyumri, Armenia
- Kiryat Yam, Israel
- Mataró, Spain
- Loulé, Portugal
- Playa (Havana), Cuba
- Salzgitter, Germany

Le Creusot

- Bor, Serbia
- Blieskastel, Germany
- Majdanpek, Serbia

Crosne

- Belœil, Belgium
- Maybole, Scotland, United Kingdom
- Rýmařov, Czech Republic
- Schotten, Germany

Cusset

- Aiud, Romania
- Neusäß, Germany

== D ==
Dainville

- Albertslund, Denmark
- Říčany, Czech Republic
- Whitstable, England, United Kingdom

Dammarie-lès-Lys

- Arcos de Valdevez, Portugal
- Eppelheim, Germany
- Montebelluna, Italy
- Tata, Hungary

Décines-Charpieu

- Arcos de Valdevez, Portugal
- Monsummano Terme, Italy
- Stepanavan, Armenia

Deuil-la-Barre

- Frankfurt, Germany
- Lourinhã, Portugal
- Vác, Hungary
- Winsford, England, United Kingdom

Dieppe

- Dieppe, Canada

Dijon

- Cluj-Napoca, Romania
- Chefchaouen, Morocco
- Dakar, Senegal
- Dallas, United States
- Guimarães, Portugal
- Mainz, Germany
- Mechelen, Belgium
- Prague 6 (Prague), Czech Republic
- Reggio Emilia, Italy
- Skopje, North Macedonia
- York, England, United Kingdom

Dole

- Carlow, Ireland
- Chaohu, China
- Kostroma, Russia
- Lahr, Germany
- Northwich, England, United Kingdom
- Sestri Levante, Italy
- Tábor, Czech Republic

Domont

- Buja, Italy
- Germering, Germany
- Shepshed, England, United Kingdom
- Wolsztyn, Poland

Douai

- Dédougou, Burkina Faso
- Harrow, England, United Kingdom
- Kenosha, United States
- Recklinghausen, Germany
- Seraing, Belgium

Douchy-les-Mines

- Méguet, Burkina Faso
- Mielec, Poland
- Vila Nova de Poiares, Portugal

Draguignan

- Tuttlingen, Germany

Drancy

- Eisenhüttenstadt, Germany
- Lyubertsy, Russia
- Prague 6 (Prague), Czech Republic
- Willenhall, England, United Kingdom

Dreux

- Almeirim, Portugal
- Bautzen, Germany
- Evesham, England, United Kingdom
- Koudougou, Burkina Faso
- Melsungen, Germany
- Todi, Italy

Dunkirk

- Gaza City, Palestine
- Krefeld, Germany
- Middlesbrough, England, United Kingdom
- Qinhuangdao, China
- Ramat HaSharon, Israel
- Rostock, Germany

== E ==
Eaubonne

- Budenheim, Germany
- Matlock, England, United Kingdom

Échirolles

- Grugliasco, Italy

Élancourt

- Attard, Malta
- Cassina de' Pecchi, Italy
- Gräfenhainichen, Germany
- Laubach, Germany

Elbeuf

- Lingen, Germany

Épernay

- Ettlingen, Germany
- Clevedon, England, United Kingdom
- Fada N'gourma, Burkina Faso
- Middelkerke, Belgium
- Montespertoli, Italy

Épinal

- Bitola, North Macedonia
- Chieri, Italy
- Gembloux, Belgium
- La Crosse, United States
- Loughborough, England, United Kingdom
- Nový Jičín, Czech Republic
- Schwäbisch Hall, Germany

Épinay-sous-Sénart

- Isernhagen, Germany
- Peacehaven, England, United Kingdom

Épinay-sur-Seine

- Alcobendas, Spain
- Oberursel, Germany
- South Tyneside, England, United Kingdom

Éragny

- Komló, Hungary
- Munster, Germany
- Nioko, Burkina Faso

Ermont

- Adria, Italy
- Banbury, England, United Kingdom
- Lampertheim, Germany
- Loja, Spain
- Longwan (Wenzhou), China
- Maldegem, Belgium
- Świdnica (rural gmina), Poland

Étampes

- Borna, Germany

Étaples

- Folkestone, England, United Kingdom
- Hückeswagen, Germany

Évreux

- Djougou, Benin
- Kashira, Russia
- Rugby, England, United Kingdom
- Rüsselsheim am Main, Germany

Évry-Courcouronnes

- Bexley, England, United Kingdom
- Nowy Targ, Poland
- Troisdorf, Germany

Eysines

- Castrillón, Spain
- Clonmel, Ireland
- Onești, Romania
- Sonnino, Italy

== F ==
Faches-Thumesnil

- Cattolica, Italy
- St Neots, England, United Kingdom
- Stolberg, Germany
- Tinkaré, Mali

Fécamp

- Mouscron, Belgium
- Putnok, Hungary
- Rheinfelden, Germany
- Vale of Glamorgan, Wales, United Kingdom

La Ferté Macé

- Biffeche, Senegal
- Ludlow, England, United Kingdom
- Neustadt am Rübenberge, Germany

Flers

- Charleston, United States
- Poundou, Burkina Faso
- Warminster, England, United Kingdom
- Wunstorf, Germany

Fleury-les-Aubrais

- Formia, Italy
- Gračanica, Bosnia and Herzegovina

Fontainebleau

- Konstanz, Germany
- Lodi, Italy
- Richmond upon Thames, England, United Kingdom
- Sintra, Portugal

Fontenay-aux-Roses

- Elstree and Borehamwood, England, United Kingdom
- Wiesloch, Germany
- Ząbkowice Śląskie, Poland

Fontenay-le-Comte

- Crevillent, Spain
- Diosig, Romania
- Gaoua, Burkina Faso
- Krotoszyn, Poland
- Palatine, United States

Fontenay-sous-Bois

- Brovary, Ukraine
- Etterbeek, Belgium
- Koungheul, Senegal
- Marinha Grande, Portugal
- Pianello Val Tidone, Italy

Forbach

- Ravanusa, Italy
- Tanguiéta, Benin
- Târgu Jiu, Romania
- Völklingen, Germany

Fougères

- Ashford, England, United Kingdom
- Bad Münstereifel, Germany
- Ouargaye, Burkina Faso
- Somoto, Nicaragua

Fourmies

- Bernburg, Germany
- Fridley, United States

Franconville

- Potters Bar, England, United Kingdom
- Viernheim, Germany

Fréjus

- Dumbéa, New Caledonia
- Fredericksburg, United States
- Paola, Italy
- Tabarka, Tunisia
- Triberg im Schwarzwald, Germany

Fresnes

- Homberg, Germany

Frontignan

- Gaeta, Italy
- M'diq, Morocco
- Pineda de Mar, Spain
- Vizela, Portugal

== G ==
Gagny

- Apeldoorn, Netherlands
- Barberino Tavarnelle, Italy
- Charlottenburg-Wilmersdorf (Berlin), Germany
- Gladsaxe, Denmark
- Minden, Germany
- Sutton, England, United Kingdom

Gaillac

- Caspe, Spain
- Santa Maria a Vico, Italy

Gap

- Pinerolo, Italy
- Traunstein, Germany

La Garde

- Montesarchio, Italy
- Spa, Belgium

La Garenne-Colombes

- Harissa-Daraoun, Lebanon
- Valpaços, Portugal
- Wangen im Allgäu, Germany
- Yokneam Illit, Israel

Gennevilliers

- La Bañeza, Spain
- Bergkamen, Germany
- Al-Bireh, Palestine
- Imola, Italy
- Ostrowiec Świętokrzyski, Poland
- Wirral, England, United Kingdom

Gentilly

- Freiberg, Germany

Givors

- Aïn Bénian, Algeria
- Döbeln, Germany
- Gavinane, Mali
- Novopolotsk, Belarus
- Orvieto, Italy
- Vila Nova de Famalicão, Portugal

Gonesse

- Leonessa, Italy

Grande-Synthe

- Suwałki, Poland

Le Grand-Quevilly

- Hinckley, England, United Kingdom
- Laatzen, Germany
- Lévis, Canada
- Morondava, Madagascar
- Ness Ziona, Israel

Granville is a member of the Douzelage, a town twinning association of towns across the European Union. Granville also has one other twin town.

Douzelage

- Agros, Cyprus
- Altea, Spain
- Asikkala, Finland
- Bad Kötzting, Germany
- Bellagio, Italy
- Bundoran, Ireland
- Chojna, Poland
- Holstebro, Denmark
- Houffalize, Belgium
- Judenburg, Austria
- Kőszeg, Hungary
- Marsaskala, Malta
- Meerssen, Netherlands
- Niederanven, Luxembourg
- Oxelösund, Sweden
- Preveza, Greece
- Rokiškis, Lithuania
- Rovinj, Croatia
- Sesimbra, Portugal
- Sherborne, England, United Kingdom
- Sigulda, Latvia
- Siret, Romania
- Škofja Loka, Slovenia
- Sušice, Czech Republic
- Tryavna, Bulgaria
- Türi, Estonia
- Zvolen, Slovakia

Other

- St Brelade, Jersey

Grasse

- Carrara, Italy
- Ingolstadt, Germany
- Kazanlak, Bulgaria
- Marblehead, United States
- Murcia, Spain
- Opole, Poland
- Pardes Hanna-Karkur, Israel
- Vila Real, Portugal

Gravelines

- Biblis, Germany
- Dartford, England, United Kingdom
- Fjarðabyggð, Iceland

Grenoble

- Bethlehem, Palestine
- Catania, Italy
- Chișinău, Moldova
- Constantine, Algeria
- Corato, Italy
- Essen, Germany
- Halle, Germany
- Innsbruck, Austria
- Kaunas, Lithuania
- Oxford, England, United Kingdom
- Ouagadougou, Burkina Faso
- Oujda, Morocco
- Phoenix, United States
- Rehovot, Israel
- Sevan, Armenia
- Sfax, Tunisia
- Stendal, Germany
- Suzhou, China
- Tsukuba, Japan

Grigny

- Wettenberg, Germany

Guérande

- Almagro, Spain
- Castro Marim, Portugal
- Dinkelsbühl, Germany
- Dolgellau, Wales, United Kingdom

Guidel

- Carrigaline, Ireland
- Negrești-Oaș, Romania
- Pulheim, Germany

Gujan-Mestras

- Santa María de Cayón, Spain

Guyancourt

- Comè, Benin
- Linlithgow, Scotland, United Kingdom
- Pegnitz, Germany

== H ==
Haguenau

- Landau in der Pfalz, Germany

Halluin

- Kočevje, Slovenia
- Lübbenau, Germany
- Menen, Belgium
- North Tyneside, England, United Kingdom
- Oer-Erkenschwick, Germany
- Pniewy, Poland
- Zulte, Belgium

Harnes

- Chrzanów, Poland
- Falkenstein, Germany
- Kabouda, Burkina Faso
- Vendres, France

Hautmont

- Halver, Germany
- Kalisz, Poland
- Kamianets-Podilskyi, Ukraine

Le Havre

- Da Nang, Vietnam
- Dalian, China
- Magdeburg, Germany
- Tampa, United States

Hayange

- Barga, Italy
- Diekirch, Luxembourg

L'Haÿ-les-Roses

- Bad Hersfeld, Germany

Hazebrouck

- Faversham, England, United Kingdom
- Porz (Cologne), Germany
- Soignies, Belgium

Hem

- Aljustrel, Portugal
- Mossley, England, United Kingdom
- Wiehl, Germany

Hendaye

- Arguedas, Spain
- Peebles, Scotland, United Kingdom
- Viana do Castelo, Portugal

Hénin-Beaumont

- Herne, Germany
- Konin, Poland
- Rolling Meadows, United States
- Rufisque, Senegal
- Wakefield, England, United Kingdom

Hennebont

- Halhul, Palestine
- Kronach, Germany
- Mourdiah, Mali
- Mumbles, Wales, United Kingdom

Les Herbiers

- Coria, Spain
- Liebertwolkwitz (Leipzig), Germany
- Newtown, Wales, United Kingdom

Herblay-sur-Seine

- Taunusstein, Germany
- Yeovil, England, United Kingdom

Hérouville-Saint-Clair

- Ahfir, Morocco
- Agnam-Goly, Senegal
- Garbsen, Germany
- Tikhvin, Russia

Honfleur

- Burlington, United States
- Plyos, Russia
- Sandwich, England, United Kingdom
- Visé, Belgium
- Wörth am Main, Germany

Houilles

- Celorico de Basto, Portugal
- Chesham, England, United Kingdom
- Friedrichsdorf, Germany
- Schœlcher, Martinique, France

Hyères

- Koekelberg, Belgium
- Rottweil, Germany

== I ==
L'Isle-sur-la-Sorgue

- Anagni, Italy
- Penicuik, Scotland, United Kingdom

Issoire

- Mont-Laurier, Canada
- Neumarkt in der Oberpfalz, Germany

Issy-les-Moulineaux

- Dapaong, Togo
- Dongcheng (Beijing), China
- Frameries, Belgium
- Guro (Seoul), South Korea
- Hounslow, England, United Kingdom
- Ichikawa, Japan
- Macerata, Italy
- Nahariya, Israel
- Pozuelo de Alarcón, Spain
- Vagharshapat, Armenia
- Weiden in der Oberpfalz, Germany

Istres

- Radolfzell, Germany

Ivry-sur-Seine

- Brandenburg an der Havel, Germany
- Dianguirdé, Mali
- Jifna, Palestine
- La Lisa (Havana), Cuba

== J ==
Jaunay-Marigny

- Cavan, Ireland
- Oleśnica, Poland
- Péruwelz, Belgium

Joigny

- Amelia, Italy
- Godalming, England, United Kingdom
- Hanover, United States
- Joigny-sur-Meuse, France
- Kilibo, Benin
- Mayen, Germany

Joinville-le-Pont

- Batalha, Portugal
- Bergisch Gladbach, Germany
- Joinville, Brazil
- Runnymede, England, United Kingdom

Joué-lès-Tours

- Città di Castello, Italy
- East Ayrshire, Scotland, United Kingdom
- Hechingen, Germany
- Ogre, Latvia
- Santa Maria da Feira, Portugal

== K ==
Kingersheim

- Tübingen, Germany

Kourou

- Cordes-sur-Ciel, France
- Macapá, Brazil

== L ==
Lagny-sur-Marne

- Alnwick, England, United Kingdom
- Haslach im Kinzigtal, Germany
- Mira, Portugal
- Sainte-Agathe-des-Monts, Canada

Lambersart

- Southborough, England, United Kingdom
- Viersen, Germany

Le Lamentin

- Santiago de Cuba, Cuba

Lamorlaye

- Ballynahinch, Northern Ireland, United Kingdom
- Villa Castelli, Italy

Landerneau

- Bam Province, Burkina Faso
- Caernarfon, Wales, United Kingdom
- Hünfeld, Germany
- Mioveni, Romania

Laon

- Soltau, Germany
- Winchester, England, United Kingdom

Laval

- Boston, England, United Kingdom
- Chalkidiki, Greece
- Gandia, Spain
- Garango, Burkina Faso
- Laval, Canada
- Lovech, Bulgaria
- Mettmann, Germany
- Modesto, United States
- Suceava, Romania

Levallois-Perret

- Tempelhof-Schöneberg (Berlin), Germany

Libourne

- Keynsham, England, United Kingdom
- Logroño, Spain
- Schwandorf, Germany

Liévin

- Bruck an der Mur, Austria
- Hagen, Germany
- Pasvalys, Lithuania
- Roccastrada, Italy
- Rybnik, Poland
- La Valette-du-Var, France

Les Lilas

- Völklingen, Germany

Lille

- Cologne, Germany
- Erfurt, Germany
- Esch-sur-Alzette, Luxembourg
- Kharkiv, Ukraine
- Leeds, England, United Kingdom
- Liège, Belgium
- Nablus, Palestine
- Oujda, Morocco
- Rotterdam, Netherlands
- Saint-Louis, Senegal
- Tlemcen, Algeria
- Turin, Italy
- Valladolid, Spain
- Wrocław, Poland

Limoges

- Charlotte, United States
- Fürth, Germany
- Grodno, Belarus
- Icheon, South Korea
- Plzeň, Czech Republic
- Seto, Japan

Livry-Gargan

- Almuñécar, Spain
- Cerveteri, Italy
- Fürstenfeldbruck, Germany
- Haringey, England, United Kingdom

Longjumeau

- Bretten, Germany
- Condeixa-a-Nova, Portugal
- Pontypool, Wales, United Kingdom

Longwy

- Differdange, Luxembourg
- Nagold, Germany

Lorient

- České Budějovice, Czech Republic
- Galway, Ireland
- Ludwigshafen, Germany
- Ventspils, Latvia
- Vigo, Spain
- Wirral, England, United Kingdom

Lourdes

- Bethlehem, Palestine
- Częstochowa, Poland
- Ourém, Portugal

Louviers

- Holzwickede, Germany
- Isle of Portland, England, United Kingdom
- San Vito dei Normanni, Italy
- Weymouth, England, United Kingdom

Lucciana

- Monaco, Monaco

Ludres

- Domažlice, Czech Republic
- Furth bei Göttweig, Austria
- Furth im Wald, Germany

Lunéville

- Schwetzingen, Germany

Lyon

- Addis Ababa, Ethiopia
- Beersheba, Israel
- Birmingham, England, United Kingdom
- Frankfurt am Main, Germany
- Gothenburg, Sweden
- Guangzhou, China
- Ho Chi Minh City, Vietnam
- Leipzig, Germany
- Łódź, Poland
- Milan, Italy
- Montreal, Canada
- Ouagadougou, Burkina Faso
- Porto-Novo, Benin
- Rabat, Morocco
- Sétif, Algeria
- St. Louis, United States
- Tinca, Romania
- Yokohama, Japan

== M ==
=== Ma ===
Mâcon

- Alcázar de San Juan, Spain
- Crewe, England, United Kingdom
- Eger, Hungary
- Lecco, Italy
- Macon, United States
- Nantwich, England, United Kingdom
- Neustadt an der Weinstraße, Germany
- Overijse, Belgium
- Pori, Finland
- Santo Tirso, Portugal

La Madeleine

- Kaarst, Germany

Maisons-Alfort

- Moers, Germany

Maisons-Laffitte

- Newmarket, England, United Kingdom
- Remagen, Germany

Malakoff

- Corsico, Italy

Mandelieu-la-Napoule

- Crans-Montana, Switzerland
- Ottobrunn, Germany

Manosque

- Leinfelden-Echterdingen, Germany
- Voghera, Italy

Le Mans

- Bolton, England, United Kingdom
- Haouza, Western Sahara
- Indianapolis, United States
- Paderborn, Germany
- Rostov-on-Don, Russia
- Suzuka, Japan
- Tudela, Spain
- Volos, Greece
- Xianyang, China

Mantes-la-Jolie

- Hillingdon, England, United Kingdom
- Maia, Portugal
- Schleswig, Germany

Marcq-en-Barœul

- Ealing, England, United Kingdom
- Gladbeck, Germany
- Kuurne, Belgium
- Poggibonsi, Italy

Marignane

- Figueres, Spain
- Göd, Hungary
- Ravanusa, Italy
- Slănic, Romania
- Wolfsburg, Germany

Marly-le-Roi

- Kita, Mali
- Leichlingen, Germany
- Marlow, England, United Kingdom
- Viseu, Portugal

Marseille

- Abidjan, Ivory Coast
- Antwerp, Belgium
- Copenhagen, Denmark
- Dakar, Senegal
- Genoa, Italy
- Glasgow, Scotland, United Kingdom
- Haifa, Israel
- Hamburg, Germany
- Kobe, Japan
- Kyiv, Ukraine
- Marrakesh, Morocco
- Naples, Italy
- Odesa, Ukraine
- Piraeus, Greece
- San Diego, United States
- Shanghai, China
- Tunis, Tunisia
- Yerevan, Armenia

Massy

- Ascoli Piceno, Italy

Maubeuge

- Ouarzazate, Morocco
- Ratingen, Germany
- Vilvoorde, Belgium

Mauges-sur-Loire

- Tihany, Hungary

Mauguio

- Anchawadi, Mali
- Boves, Italy
- Lorca, Spain
- Midoun, Tunisia
- Păușești-Măglași, Romania

Maurepas

- Henstedt-Ulzburg, Germany
- Tirat Carmel, Israel
- Usedom, Germany
- Waterlooville, England, United Kingdom

Mayenne

- Devizes, England, United Kingdom
- Jesi, Italy
- Waiblingen, Germany

=== Me–Mi ===
Meaux

- Basildon, England, United Kingdom
- Heiligenhaus, Germany

Melun

- Crema, Italy
- Spelthorne, England, United Kingdom
- Vaihingen (Stuttgart), Germany

Mende

- Vila Real, Portugal
- Volterra, Italy
- Wunsiedel, Germany

Menton

- Baden-Baden, Germany
- Laguna Beach, United States
- Montreux, Switzerland
- Nafplio, Greece
- Sochi, Russia

Mérignac

- Kaolack, Senegal
- Saint-Laurent (Montreal), Canada
- Vilanova i la Geltrú, Spain

Metz

- Blida, Algeria
- Chernivtsi, Ukraine
- Gloucester, England, United Kingdom
- Hradec Králové, Czech Republic
- Karmiel, Israel
- Luxembourg, Luxembourg
- Saint-Denis, Réunion, France
- Tangier, Morocco
- Trier, Germany

Meudon

- Brezno, Slovakia
- Celle, Germany
- Ciechanów, Poland
- Mazkeret Batya, Israel
- Rushmoor, England, United Kingdom
- Woluwe-Saint-Lambert, Belgium

Meulan-en-Yvelines

- Arraiolos, Portugal
- Kilsyth, Scotland, United Kingdom
- Taufkirchen, Germany

Meylan

- Didcot, England, United Kingdom
- Gonzales, United States
- Planegg, Germany

Millau

- Bad Salzuflen, Germany
- Bridlington, England, United Kingdom
- Louga, Senegal
- Mealhada, Portugal
- Plopeni, Romania
- Sagunto, Spain

=== Mo–Mu ===
Montargis

- Crowborough, England, United Kingdom
- Greven, Germany

Montauban

- Alcalá de Henares, Spain
- Avola, Italy
- Pawhuska, United States

Montbéliard

- Ludwigsburg, Germany

Montbrison

- Eichstätt, Germany
- Sežana, Slovenia

Montélimar

- Mollet del Vallès, Spain
- Nabeul, Tunisia
- Racine, United States
- Ravensburg, Germany
- Rhondda Cynon Taf, Wales, United Kingdom
- Rivoli, Italy
- Sisian, Armenia

Montereau-Fault-Yonne

- Aydın, Turkey
- Chishui, China
- Otley, England, United Kingdom
- Paredes, Portugal
- Safi, Morocco
- Walldürn, Germany

Montesson

- Baesweiler, Germany
- Thame, England, United Kingdom

Montgeron

- Eschborn, Germany
- Póvoa de Varzim, Portugal

Montigny-en-Gohelle

- Stollberg, Germany
- Tamási, Hungary

Montigny-le-Bretonneux

- Denton, England, United Kingdom
- Dolyna, Ukraine
- Kierspe, Germany
- Lunca, Romania
- Marostica, Italy
- San Fernando, Spain
- Wicklow, Ireland

Montivilliers

- Nasséré, Burkina Faso
- Nordhorn, Germany

Montluçon

- Antsirabe, Madagascar
- Guimarães, Portugal
- Hagen, Germany
- Igualada, Spain
- Leszno, Poland

Montmorency

- Kehl, Germany
- Knutsford, England, United Kingdom
- Pułtusk, Poland

Montpellier

- Barcelona, Spain
- Bethlehem, Palestine
- Chengdu, China
- Fez, Morocco
- Heidelberg, Germany
- Kos, Greece
- Louisville, United States
- Obninsk, Russia
- Palermo, Italy
- Rio de Janeiro, Brazil
- Sherbrooke, Canada
- Tiberias, Israel
- Tlemcen, Algeria

Montreuil

- Cottbus, Germany

Mont-de-Marsan

- Alingsås, Sweden
- Gyumri, Armenia
- Tudela, Spain

Mont-Saint-Aignan

- Barsinghausen, Germany
- Brzeg Dolny, Poland
- Edenbridge, England
- Rouko, Burkina Faso

Morlaix

- Truro, England, United Kingdom
- Würselen, Germany

Moulins

- Bad Vilbel, Germany
- Montepulciano, Italy

Mouvaux

- Buckingham, England, United Kingdom
- Halle, Belgium
- Neukirchen-Vluyn, Germany

Mulhouse

- Antwerp, Belgium
- Bergamo, Italy
- Chemnitz, Germany
- Givatayim, Israel
- Jining, China
- Kassel, Germany
- Timișoara, Romania
- Walsall, England, United Kingdom

Les Mureaux

- Idar-Oberstein, Germany
- Margate, England, United Kingdom
- Nonantola, Italy
- Sosnowiec, Poland

Muret

- Monzón, Spain

== N ==
Nancy

- Cincinnati, United States
- Karlsruhe, Germany
- Kanazawa, Japan
- Kiryat Shmona, Israel
- Krasnodar, Russia
- Kunming, China
- Newcastle upon Tyne, England, United Kingdom
- Liège, Belgium
- Lublin, Poland
- Padua, Italy
- Vinnytsia, Ukraine

Nanterre

- Craiova, Romania
- Pesaro, Italy
- Tlemcen, Algeria
- Veliky Novgorod, Russia
- Watford, England, United Kingdom

Nantes

- Cardiff, Wales, United Kingdom
- Cluj-Napoca, Romania
- Jacksonville, United States
- Niigata, Japan
- Qingdao, China
- Saarbrücken, Germany
- Seattle, United States
- Suncheon, South Korea
- Tbilisi, Georgia

Nemours

- Mühltal, Germany
- Wilmington, United States

Neuilly-Plaisance

- Montgomery, United States

Neuilly-sur-Seine

- Uccle, Belgium
- Windsor and Maidenhead, England, United Kingdom

Nevers

- Charleville-Mézières, France
- Curtea de Argeș, Romania
- Erzsébetváros (Budapest), Hungary
- Hammamet, Tunisia
- Koblenz, Germany
- Lund, Sweden
- Mantua, Italy
- Neubrandenburg, Germany
- St Albans, England, United Kingdom
- Stavroupoli, Greece
- Taizhou, China

Nice

- Abidjan, Ivory Coast
- Alicante, Spain
- Antananarivo, Madagascar
- Astana, Kazakhstan
- Cuneo, Italy
- Edinburgh, Scotland, United Kingdom
- Gdańsk, Poland
- Hangzhou, China
- Houston, United States
- Kamakura, Japan
- Laval, Canada
- Libreville, Gabon
- Locarno, Switzerland
- Manila, Philippines
- Miami, United States
- Netanya, Israel
- New Orleans, United States
- Nouméa, New Caledonia
- Nuremberg, Germany
- Ouagadougou, Burkina Faso
- Papeete, French Polynesia
- Phuket, Thailand
- Rio de Janeiro, Brazil
- Saint Petersburg, Russia
- Santa Cruz de Tenerife, Spain
- Sorrento, Italy
- Sousse, Tunisia
- Szeged, Hungary
- Thessaloniki, Greece
- Xiamen, China
- Yalta, Ukraine
- Yerevan, Armenia

Nîmes

- Braunschweig, Germany
- Córdoba, Spain
- Fort Worth, United States
- Frankfurt an der Oder, Germany
- Meknes, Morocco
- Prague 1 (Prague), Czech Republic
- Preston, England, United Kingdom
- Rishon LeZion, Israel
- Verona, Italy

Niort

- Atakpamé, Togo
- Coburg, Germany
- Cové, Benin
- Gijón, Spain
- Springe, Germany
- Tomelloso, Spain
- Wellingborough, England, United Kingdom

Nogent-sur-Marne

- Bolesławiec, Poland
- Nazaré, Portugal
- Siegburg, Germany
- Val Nure, Italy
- Yverdon-les-Bains, Switzerland

Nogent-sur-Oise

- Aida Camp, Palestine
- Beverley, England, United Kingdom
- Fucecchio, Italy
- Gersthofen, Germany

Noisy-le-Roi

- Albion, United States
- Godella, Spain

Noisy-le-Sec

- Arganda del Rey, Spain
- Djeol, Mauritania
- South Tyneside, England, United Kingdom

== O ==
Olivet

- Bad Oldesloe, Germany
- Fakenham, England, United Kingdom

Orange

- Breda, Netherlands
- Byblos, Lebanon
- Diest, Belgium
- Dillenburg, Germany
- Jarosław, Poland
- Kielce, Poland
- Rastatt, Germany
- Spoleto, Italy
- Vélez-Rubio, Spain
- Weifang, China

Orchies

- Kelso, Scotland, United Kingdom

Orléans

- Dundee, Scotland, United Kingdom
- Kraków, Poland
- Kristiansand, Norway
- Lugoj, Romania
- Münster, Germany
- New Orleans, United States
- Saint-Flour, France
- Tarragona, Spain
- Treviso, Italy
- Utsunomiya, Japan
- Wichita, United States
- Yangzhou, China

Orly

- Campi Bisenzio, Italy
- Drobeta-Turnu Severin, Romania
- Klin, Russia
- Pointe-à-Pitre, Guadeloupe, France

Orsay

- Dogondoutchi, Niger
- Kempen, Germany
- Vila Nova de Paiva, Portugal

Orvault

- Heusweiler, Germany
- Tredegar, Wales, United Kingdom

Oullins

- Nürtingen, Germany
- Pescia, Italy

Oyonnax

- Carpi, Italy
- Eislingen, Germany

== P ==
=== Pa–Pe ===
Palaiseau

- Unna, Germany

Pantin

- Meshchansky (Moscow), Russia
- Scandicci, Italy

Paray-le-Monial

- Bad Dürkheim, Germany
- Bethlehem, Palestine
- Payerne, Switzerland
- Shizuishan, China
- Wells, England, United Kingdom

Paris

- Rome, Italy

Parthenay

- Abrantes, Portugal
- Arnedo, Spain
- Edmundston, Canada
- Manakara, Madagaskar
- Tipperary, Ireland
- Tsévié, Togo
- Weinstadt, Germany

Pau

- Daloa, Ivory Coast
- Göttingen, Germany
- Kōfu, Japan
- Pistoia, Italy
- Setúbal, Portugal
- Swansea, Wales, United Kingdom
- Xi'an, China
- Zaragoza, Spain

Les Pavillons-sous-Bois

- Brackley, England, United Kingdom
- Bragança, Portugal
- Écija, Spain
- Münstermaifeld, Germany

Le Pecq

- Aranjuez, Spain
- Barnes, England, United Kingdom
- Hennef, Germany

Périgueux

- Amberg, Germany

Perpignan

- Berkane, Morocco
- Hanover, Germany
- Lancaster, England, United Kingdom
- Lleida, Spain
- Ma'alot-Tarshiha, Israel
- Sarasota, United States
- Tavira, Portugal

Le Perreux-sur-Marne

- Forchheim, Germany

Pertuis

- Alton, England, United Kingdom
- Este, Italy
- Herborn, Germany
- Utiel, Spain

Pessac

- Banfora, Burkina Faso
- Burgos, Spain
- Galați, Romania
- Göppingen, Germany
- Viana do Castelo, Portugal

=== Pl–Pu ===
Plaisance-du-Touch

- Carnate, Italy
- Lingfield, England, United Kingdom
- Utebo, Spain

Plaisir

- Bad Aussee, Austria
- Geesthacht, Germany
- Lowestoft, England, United Kingdom
- Moita, Portugal

Plérin

- Cookstown, Northern Ireland, United Kingdom
- Herzogenrath, Germany
- Wronki, Poland

Le Plessis-Robinson

- Woking, England, United Kingdom

Le Plessis-Trévise

- Burladingen, Germany
- Ourém, Portugal
- Sparta, Greece
- Wągrowiec, Poland

Ploemeur

- Diksmuide, Belgium
- Ehmej, Lebanon
- Fermoy, Ireland

Ploërmel

- Apensen, Germany
- Cobh, Ireland
- Dabola, Guinea
- Gorseinon, Wales, United Kingdom
- Kolbuszowa, Portugal
- Llwchwr, Wales, United Kingdom

Plouzané

- Ceccano, Italy
- Kilrush, Ireland
- Pencoed, Wales, United Kingdom
- Stelle, Germany

Poissy

- Pirmasens, Germany

Poitiers

- Coimbra, Portugal
- Iaşi, Romania
- Lafayette, United States
- Northampton, England, United Kingdom
- Marburg, Germany
- Moundou, Chad
- Yaroslavl, Russia

Pontault-Combault

- Anyama, Ivory Coast
- Beilstein, Germany
- Caminha, Portugal
- Rădăuți, Romania

Pontivy

- Napoleonville, United States
- Tavistock, England, United Kingdom
- Wesseling, Germany

Pontoise

- Arenzano, Italy
- Böblingen, Germany
- Columbia, United States
- Sevenoaks, England, United Kingdom
- Sittard-Geleen, Netherlands
- West Lancashire, England, United Kingdom

Pont-Sainte-Maxence

- Felgueiras, Portugal
- Grignasco, Italy
- Linguère, Senegal
- Sambreville, Belgium
- Sulzbach, Germany

La Possession

- Foshan, China
- Mamoudzou, Mayotte
- Port Louis, Mauritius
- Victoria, Seychelles
- Villeneuve-d'Ascq, France

Puteaux

- Braga, Portugal
- Esch-sur-Alzette, Luxembourg
- Gan Yavne, Israel
- Kati, Mali
- Mödling, Austria
- Offenbach am Main, Germany
- Opočno, Czech Republic
- Tangier, Morocco
- Velletri, Italy
- Zemun (Belgrade), Serbia

Le Puy-en-Velay

- Brugherio, Italy
- Mangualde, Portugal
- Meschede, Germany
- Tonbridge and Malling, England, United Kingdom
- Tortosa, Spain

== Q ==
Le Quesnoy

- Dej, Romania
- Cambridge (Waipa), New Zealand
- Morlanwelz, Belgium
- Ratingen, Germany

Quimper

- Foggia, Italy
- Laurium, Greece
- Limerick, Ireland
- Ourense, Spain
- Remscheid, Germany
- Yantai, China

Quimperlé

- Athenry, Ireland
- Geilenkirchen, Germany
- Liskeard, England, United Kingdom
- Nara, Mali

Quincy-sous-Sénart

- Montemarciano, Italy
- Saue, Estonia

Quint-Fonsegrives

- Leiria, Portugal

== R ==
=== Ra–Ri ===
Le Raincy

- Barnet, England, United Kingdom
- Caldas da Rainha, Portugal
- Clusone, Italy
- Yavne, Israel

Rambouillet

- Great Yarmouth, England, United Kingdom
- Kirchheim unter Teck, Germany
- Torres Novas, Portugal
- Waterloo, Belgium
- Zafra, Spain

Ramonville-Saint-Agne

- Karben, Germany
- Zuera, Spain

Reims

- Aachen, Germany
- Arlington County, United States
- Brazzaville, Congo
- Canterbury, England, United Kingdom
- Florence, Italy
- Kutná Hora, Czech Republic
- Nagoya, Japan
- Salzburg, Austria

Rennes

- Almaty, Kazakhstan
- Bandiagara Cercle, Mali
- Brno, Czech Republic
- Cork, Ireland
- Erlangen, Germany
- Exeter, England, United Kingdom
- Jinan, China
- Poznań, Poland
- Rochester, United States
- Sendai, Japan
- Sétif, Algeria
- Sibiu, Romania

Rillieux-la-Pape

- Ditzingen, Germany
- Łęczyca, Poland
- Natitingou, Benin

Riom

- Adur, England, United Kingdom
- Algemesí, Spain
- Nördlingen, Germany
- Viana do Castelo, Portugal
- Żywiec, Poland

Riorges

- Calasparra, Spain
- Donzdorf, Germany
- Elland, England, United Kingdom
- Piatra Neamț, Romania

Rive-de-Gier

- Alessandria della Rocca, Italy
- Bivona, Italy
- Cianciana, Italy
- Kysucké Nové Mesto, Slovakia
- San Biagio Platani, Italy
- Santo Stefano Quisquina, Italy

Rixheim

- Lohne, Germany
- San Vito al Tagliamento, Italy

=== Ro–Ru ===
Roanne

- Guadalajara, Spain
- Legnica, Poland
- Montevarchi, Italy
- Nuneaton and Bedworth, England, United Kingdom
- Piatra Neamț, Romania
- Reutlingen, Germany

Rochefort

- Papenburg, Germany
- Torrelavega, Spain

La Rochelle

- Acre, Israel
- Essaouira, Morocco
- Figueiró (Amarante), Portugal
- Lübeck, Germany
- New Rochelle, United States
- Petrozavodsk, Russia

La Roche-sur-Yon

- Burg, Germany
- Cáceres, Spain
- Coleraine, Northern Ireland, United Kingdom
- Drummondville, Canada
- Gummersbach, Germany
- Tizi Ouzou, Algeria

Rodez

- Bamberg, Germany

Roissy-en-Brie

- Abergele, Wales, United Kingdom
- Barmstedt, Germany
- Colwyn Bay, Wales, United Kingdom

Romans-sur-Isère

- Coalville, England, United Kingdom
- Corsano, Italy
- Straubing, Germany
- Varese, Italy
- Zadar, Croatia
- Zlín, Czech Republic

Romilly-sur-Seine

- Milford Haven, England, United Kingdom
- Gotha, Germany
- Lüdenscheid, Germany
- Medicina, Italy
- Uman, Ukraine

Romorantin-Lanthenay

- Aranda de Duero, Spain
- Langen, Germany
- Long Eaton, England, United Kingdom
- Mudanya, Turkey

Ronchin

- Halle, Germany
- Kirkby-in-Ashfield, England, United Kingdom
- Târnăveni, Romania

Rosny-sous-Bois

- Cotonou, Benin
- Übach-Palenberg, Germany
- Yanzhou (Jining), China

Roubaix

- Bradford, England, United Kingdom
- Covilhã, Portugal
- Mönchengladbach, Germany
- Prato, Italy
- Skopje, North Macedonia
- Sosnowiec, Poland
- Verviers, Belgium

Rouen

- Cleveland, United States
- Hanover, Germany
- Jeju City, South Korea
- Ningbo, China
- Norwich, England, United Kingdom
- Salerno, Italy

Royan

- Annapolis Royal, Canada
- Balingen, Germany
- Gosport, England, United Kingdom

Rueil-Malmaison

- Bad Soden, Germany
- Bukhara, Uzbekistan
- Capaccio Paestum, Italy
- Carmel, United States
- Chernivtsi, Ukraine
- Dubrovnik, Croatia
- Fribourg, Switzerland
- Jelgava, Latvia
- Kiryat Malakhi, Israel
- Kitzbühel, Austria
- Sergiyev Posad, Russia
- Timișoara, Romania
- Tōgane, Japan
- Zouk Mikael, Lebanon

Ruelle-sur-Touvre

- Albaida, Spain
- Amstetten, Austria
- Banbridge, Northern Ireland, United Kingdom
- Roudnice nad Labem, Czech Republic

Rumilly

- Maglie, Italy
- Michelstadt, Germany

== S ==
=== Sa ===
Les Sables-d'Olonne

- Gourcy, Burkina Faso
- A Laracha, Spain
- Murat, France
- Schwabach, Germany
- Worthing, England, United Kingdom

Saintes

- Cuevas del Almanzora, Spain
- Nivelles, Belgium
- Salisbury, England, United Kingdom
- Timbuktu, Mali
- Vladimir, Russia
- Xanten, Germany

Sainte-Foy-lès-Lyon

- Lichfield, England, United Kingdom
- Limburg an der Lahn, Germany

Sainte-Geneviève-des-Bois

- Mikołów, Poland
- Obertshausen, Germany
- Penafiel, Portugal

Saint-André-lez-Lille

- Dormagen, Germany
- St Mary's Bay, England, United Kingdom
- Wieliczka, Poland

Saint-Avertin

- Steinbach, Germany

Saint-Brice-sous-Forêt

- Devínska Nová Ves (Bratislava), Slovakia

Saint-Brieuc

- Aberystwyth, Wales, United Kingdom
- Agia Paraskevi, Greece
- Alsdorf, Germany

Saint-Chamond

- Grevenbroich, Germany

Saint-Cloud

- Bad Godesberg (Bonn), Germany
- Boadilla del Monte, Spain
- Frascati, Italy
- Kortrijk, Belgium
- St. Cloud, Florida, United States
- St. Cloud, Minnesota, United States
- Windsor and Maidenhead, England, United Kingdom

Saint-Cyr-l'École

- Bonnyrigg, Scotland, United Kingdom
- Butzbach, Germany
- Lasswade, Scotland, United Kingdom

Saint-Cyr-sur-Loire

- Koussanar, Senegal
- Meinerzhagen, Germany
- Morphou, Cyprus
- Newark-on-Trent, England, United Kingdom
- Ptuj, Slovenia

Saint-Denis

- Coatbridge, Scotland, United Kingdom
- Djélébou, Mali
- Gera, Germany
- Karakoro, Mali
- Santa Catarina, Cape Verde
- Sesto San Giovanni, Italy
- Tiznit, Morocco
- Tuzla, Bosnia and Herzegovina

Saint-Dié-des-Vosges

- Arlon, Belgium
- Cattolica, Italy
- Crikvenica, Croatia
- Friedrichshafen, Germany
- Lorraine, Canada
- Lowell, United States
- Meckhe, Senegal
- Zakopane, Poland

Saint-Égrève

- Karben, Germany
- Krnov, Czech Republic
- Leini, Italy
- Mińsk Mazowiecki, Poland
- Telšiai, Lithuania

Saint-Étienne

- Ben Arous, Tunisia
- Coventry, England, United Kingdom
- Des Moines, United States
- Ferrara, Italy
- Geltendorf, Germany
- Katowice, Poland
- Luhansk, Ukraine
- Monastir, Tunisia
- Oeiras, Portugal
- Patras, Greece
- Tamatave, Madagascar
- Windsor, Canada
- Wuppertal, Germany
- Xuzhou, China

Saint-Étienne-du-Rouvray

- Gateshead, England, United Kingdom
- Nordenham, Germany
- Nova Kakhovka, Ukraine

Saint-Genis-Laval

- Cirencester, England, United Kingdom
- Pontassieve, Italy
- Săliște, Romania

Saint-Germain-en-Laye

- Aschaffenburg, Germany
- Ayr, Scotland, United Kingdom
- Konstancin-Jeziorna, Poland
- Schwelm, Germany
- Winchester, United States

Saint-Herblain

- Bethlehem, Palestine
- Cleja, Romania
- Kazanlak, Bulgaria
- N'Diaganiao, Senegal
- Sankt Ingbert, Germany
- Viladecans, Spain
- Waterford, Ireland

Saint-Jean-de-Braye

- Boussouma, Burkina Faso
- March, England, United Kingdom
- Pfullendorf, Germany

Saint-Jean-de-la-Ruelle

- Amposta, Spain
- Gommern, Germany
- Niepołomice, Poland

Saint-Junien

- Charleroi, Belgium
- Wendelstein, Germany
- Żukowo, Poland

Saint-Laurent-du-Maroni

- Saint-Joseph, Martinique, France
- Saint-Martin-de-Ré, France

Saint-Laurent-du-Var

- Landsberg am Lech, Germany
- Siófok, Hungary

Saint-Lô

- Aalen, Germany
- Christchurch, England, United Kingdom
- Roanoke, United States
- Saint-Ghislain, Belgium

Saint-Mandé

- Concord, United States
- Drogheda, Ireland
- Eschwege, Germany
- Tres Cantos, Spain
- Vila Verde, Portugal
- Waltham Forest, England, United Kingdom
- Yanggu, South Korea

Saint-Maur-des-Fossés

- Bognor Regis, England, United Kingdom
- Hamelin, Germany
- Leiria, Portugal
- La Louvière, Belgium
- Pforzheim, Germany
- Ramat HaSharon, Israel
- Rimini, Italy
- Ziguinchor, Senegal

Saint-Médard-en-Jalles

- Almansa, Spain
- Merzig, Germany
- Sabaudia, Italy

Saint-Michel-sur-Orge

- Fresagrandinaria, Italy
- Nowa Sól, Poland
- Püttlingen, Germany
- Veszprém, Hungary
- Žamberk, Czech Republic

Saint-Nazaire

- Avilés, Spain
- Saarlouis, Germany
- Sunderland, England, United Kingdom

Saint-Ouen-sur-Seine

- Podolsk, Russia
- Ruse, Bulgaria
- Salford, England, United Kingdom
- Terni, Italy

Saint-Pierre-des-Corps

- Hebron, Palestine

Saint-Priest

- Mühlheim am Main, Germany

Saint-Quentin

- Kaiserslautern, Germany
- Rotherham, England, United Kingdom
- San Lorenzo de El Escorial, Spain
- Tongzhou (Beijing), China

Saint-Raphaël

- Jermuk, Armenia
- Sankt Georgen im Schwarzwald, Germany
- Tiberias, Israel

Saint-Sébastien-sur-Loire

- Cernavodă, Romania
- Glinde, Germany
- Kaposvár, Hungary
- Kati, Mali
- Porthcawl, Wales, United Kingdom

Sallaumines

- Lugau, Germany
- Torez, Ukraine
- Trbovlje, Slovenia
- Wodzisław Śląski, Poland

Salon-de-Provence

- Aranda de Duero, Spain
- Godmanchester, England, United Kingdom
- Gubbio, Italy
- Huntingdon, England, United Kingdom
- Szentendre, Hungary
- Wertheim, Germany

Sanary-sur-Mer

- Bad Säckingen, Germany
- Hongcheon, South Korea
- Kościerzyna, Poland
- Luino, Italy
- Noginsk, Russia
- Purkersdorf, Austria

Sarcelles

- Hattersheim am Main, Germany
- Netanya, Israel

Sartrouville

- Kallithea, Greece
- Paços de Ferreira, Portugal
- Waldkraiburg, Germany

Saumur

- Formigine, Italy
- Verden an der Aller, Germany
- Warwick, England, United Kingdom

Saverne

- Donaueschingen, Germany
- Leominster, England, United Kingdom

Savigny-le-Temple

- Boutilimit, Mauritania
- Comarnic, Romania
- Iznalloz, Spain
- Ndjili, Democratic Republic of the Congo
- Tyresö, Sweden

=== Sc–Su ===
Sceaux

- Brühl, Germany
- Royal Leamington Spa, England, United Kingdom

Seclin

- Apolda, Germany
- Larkhall, Scotland, United Kingdom
- Méguet, Burkina Faso
- Zabrze, Poland

Sedan

- Eisenach, Germany

Sélestat

- Charleroi, Belgium
- Dornbirn, Austria
- Grenchen, Switzerland
- Waldkirch, Germany

Senlis

- Langenfeld, Germany
- Montale, Italy
- Pecherskyi (Kyiv), Ukraine

Sens

- Chester, England, United Kingdom
- Fafe, Portugal
- Lörrach, Germany
- Senigallia, Italy
- Vyshhorod, Ukraine

Sète

- Cetara, Italy
- El Jadida, Morocco
- Neuburg an der Donau, Germany

Sèvres

- Mount Prospect, United States
- Wolfenbüttel, Germany

La Seyne-sur-Mer

- Berdiansk, Ukraine
- Buti, Italy
- Maardu, Estonia
- Menzel Bourguiba, Tunisia

Six-Fours-les-Plages

- Emmendingen, Germany

Soorts-Hossegor

- Taiʻarapu-Ouest, French Polynesia

Sorgues

- Wettenberg, Germany

Soyaux

- Ivančice, Czech Republic
- Monifieth, Scotland, United Kingdom
- Palos de la Frontera, Spain
- Sona, Italy

Stains

- Al-Am'ari, Palestine
- Cheshunt, England, United Kingdom
- Figuig, Morocco
- Luco dei Marsi, Italy
- Saalfeld, Germany
- Sidi El Houari (Oran), Algeria

Strasbourg

- Aida Camp, Palestine
- Boston, United States
- Dresden, Germany
- Leicester, England, United Kingdom
- Ramat Gan, Israel
- Stuttgart, Germany

Sucy-en-Brie

- Bietigheim-Bissingen, Germany
- Ofakim, Israel
- Scituate, United States
- Surrey Heath, England, United Kingdom
- Trujillo, Peru

Suresnes

- Colmenar Viejo, Spain
- Göttingen (district), Germany
- Hackney, England, United Kingdom
- Hann. Münden, Germany
- Holon, Israel
- Kragujevac, Serbia
- Villach, Austria

== T ==
Talence

- Alcalá de Henares, Spain
- Chaves, Portugal
- Trikala, Greece

Tarascon

- Beit She'an, Israel
- Elmshorn, Germany
- Fraga, Spain
- Neviano degli Arduini, Italy
- Porrentruy, Switzerland
- Tarascon-sur-Ariège, France

Tarbes

- Altenkirchen, Germany
- Huesca, Spain

Taverny

- Bingerville, Ivory Coast
- Lüdinghausen, Germany
- Novi Sad, Serbia
- Punta Umbría, Spain
- Sedlčany, Czech Republic
- Tavira, Portugal

La Teste-de-Buch

- Binghamton, United States
- Chipiona, Spain
- Curepipe, Mauritius
- Schwaigern, Germany

Thiais

- Einbeck, Germany

Thionville

- Gao, Mali
- Urbana, United States

Thonon-les-Bains

- Mercer Island, United States

Thouars

- Diepholz, Germany
- Hannut, Belgium
- Helensburgh, Scotland, United Kingdom
- Międzyrzec Podlaski, Poland

Tinqueux

- Leimen, Germany
- Myślenice, Poland

Torcy

- Girvan, Scotland, United Kingdom
- Lingenfeld, Germany

Toul

- Hamm, Germany

Toulon

- Kronstadt, Russia
- Mannheim, Germany
- Norfolk, United States
- La Spezia, Italy

Toulouse

- Atlanta, United States
- Bologna, Italy
- Chongqing, China
- Elche, Spain
- Kyiv, Ukraine
- Tel Aviv, Israel

Tourcoing

- Biella, Italy
- Bottrop, Germany
- Guimarães, Portugal
- Jastrzębie-Zdrój, Poland
- Mitte (Berlin), Germany
- Mühlhausen, Germany
- Rochdale, England, United Kingdom

Tournefeuille

- Graus, Spain

Tours

- Brașov, Romania
- Luoyang, China
- Minneapolis, United States
- Mülheim an der Ruhr, Germany
- Parma, Italy
- Segovia, Spain
- Takamatsu, Japan
- Trois-Rivières, Canada

Trappes

- Castiglione del Lago, Italy
- Congleton, England, United Kingdom
- Kopřivnice, Czech Republic

Tremblay-en-France

- Loropéni, Burkina Faso
- Marsciano, Italy

Troyes

- Alkmaar, Netherlands
- Brescia, Italy
- Chesterfield, England, United Kingdom
- Darmstadt, Germany
- Tournai, Belgium
- Zielona Góra, Poland

Tulle

- Bury, England, United Kingdom
- Dueville, Italy
- Errenteria, Spain
- Lousada, Portugal
- Schorndorf, Germany
- Smolensk, Russia

== U ==
Les Ulis

- Naumburg, Germany
- Sátão, Portugal
- Sédhiou, Senegal
- Thetford, England, United Kingdom

== V ==
=== Va–Ve ===
Valence

- Asti, Italy
- Batroun, Lebanon
- Biberach an der Riss, Germany
- Gedera, Israel
- Ijevan, Armenia
- Pushkin, Russia
- Tendring, England, United Kingdom

Valenciennes

- Agrigento, Italy
- Central AO (Moscow), Russia
- Düren, Germany
- Gliwice, Poland
- Medway, England, United Kingdom
- Yichang, China

La Valette-du-Var

- Bocșa, Romania
- Krościenko nad Dunajcem, Poland
- Liévin, France
- Novocherkassk, Russia
- Somma Lombardo, Italy
- Villingen-Schwenningen, Germany

Vallauris

- Hódmezővásárhely, Hungary
- Lindenberg im Allgäu, Germany

Valserhône

- Bretten, Germany
- Saint-Christophe, Italy

Vandœuvre-lès-Nancy

- Gedling, England, United Kingdom
- Grottaferrata, Italy
- Lemgo, Germany
- Poa, Burkina Faso
- Ponte de Lima, Portugal

Vannes

- Cuxhaven, Germany
- Fareham, England, United Kingdom
- Mons, Belgium
- Wałbrzych, Poland

Vanves

- Ballymoney, Northern Ireland, United Kingdom
- Lehrte, Germany
- Rosh HaAyin, Israel

Vélizy-Villacoublay

- Alytus, Lithuania
- Dietzenbach, Germany
- Harlow, England, United Kingdom

Vence

- Lahnstein, Germany
- Ouahigouya, Burkina Faso
- Stamford, England, United Kingdom

Vendôme

- Gevelsberg, Germany
- Hampton, United States

Vénissieux

- Manises, Spain
- Oschatz, Germany

Verneuil-sur-Seine

- Aguilar de la Frontera, Spain
- Beaconsfield, Canada
- Weiterstadt, Germany

Vernon

- Bad Kissingen, Germany
- Massa, Italy

Vernouillet, Eure-et-Loir

- Cheddar, England, United Kingdom
- Felsberg, Germany

Vernouillet, Yvelines

- Alberndorf im Pulkautal, Austria
- Hainburg, Germany
- Trumau, Austria
- Yarm, England, United Kingdom

Versailles

- Carthage, Tunisia
- Gyeongju, South Korea
- Nara, Japan
- Potsdam, Germany
- Taipei, Taiwan

Vertou

- Morges, Switzerland
- Poděbrady, Czech Republic

Le Vésinet

- Oakwood, United States
- Outremont (Montreal), Canada
- Unterhaching, Germany
- Villanueva de la Cañada, Spain
- Worcester, England, United Kingdom

=== Vi–Vo ===
Vichy

- Bad Tölz, Germany
- Dunfermline, Scotland, United Kingdom
- Rhein-Neckar (district), Germany
- San Giuliano Terme, Italy
- Wilhelmshaven, Germany

Vienne

- Albacete, Spain
- Esslingen am Neckar, Germany
- Goris, Armenia
- Greenwich, United States
- Neath Port Talbot, Wales, United Kingdom
- Piotrków Trybunalski, Poland
- Schiedam, Netherlands
- Udine, Italy
- Velenje, Slovenia

Vierzon

- Barcelos, Portugal
- Bitterfeld-Wolfen, Germany
- Develi, Turkey
- Dongxihu (Wuhan), China
- Hereford, England, United Kingdom
- El Jadida, Morocco
- Kahale, Lebanon
- Kamienna Góra, Poland
- Miranda de Ebro, Spain
- Rendsburg, Germany
- Sig, Algeria

Vigneux-sur-Seine

- Limavady, Northern Ireland, United Kingdom
- Monção, Portugal
- Troyan, Bulgaria

Villebon-sur-Yvette

- Liederbach am Taunus, Germany
- Las Rozas de Madrid, Spain
- Saldus, Latvia
- Whitnash, England, United Kingdom

Villefontaine

- Bitterfeld-Wolfen, Germany
- Gremda, Tunisia
- Kahl am Main, Germany
- Salzano, Italy

Villefranche-de-Rouergue

- Bihać, Bosnia and Herzegovina
- Pula, Croatia
- Sarzana, Italy

Villefranche-sur-Saône

- Bertinoro, Italy
- Bühl, Germany
- Călărași District, Moldova
- Kandi, Benin
- Schkeuditz, Germany

Villejuif

- Dunaújváros, Hungary
- Mirandola, Italy
- Neubrandenburg, Germany
- Vila Franca de Xira, Portugal
- Yambol, Bulgaria

Villemomble

- Droylsden, England, United Kingdom
- Hardtberg (Bonn), Germany
- Portimão, Portugal

Villenave-d'Ornon

- Bridgend, Wales, United Kingdom
- Seeheim-Jugenheim, Germany
- Torres Vedras, Portugal

Villeneuve-d'Ascq

- Haidari, Greece
- Iași, Romania
- Leverkusen, Germany
- Ouidah, Benin
- La Possession, Réunion, France
- Racibórz, Poland
- Stirling, Scotland, United Kingdom
- Tournai, Belgium

Villeneuve-la-Garenne

- Hof, Germany

Villeneuve-le-Roi

- Arpino, Italy
- São Pedro do Sul, Portugal
- Stourport-on-Severn, England, United Kingdom
- Vratsa, Bulgaria

Villeneuve-Saint-Georges

- Eastleigh, England, United Kingdom
- Kornwestheim, Germany

Villeneuve-sur-Lot

- Ávila, Spain
- Bouaké, Ivory Coast
- Neustadt bei Coburg, Germany
- San Donà di Piave, Italy
- Troon, Scotland, United Kingdom

Villeparisis

- Maldon, England, United Kingdom
- Pietrasanta, Italy
- Wathlingen, Germany

Villepinte

- Schwendi, Germany

Villeurbanne

- Abanilla, Spain
- Abovyan, Armenia
- Bat Yam, Israel
- Mogilev, Belarus

Villiers-sur-Marne

- Entroncamento, Portugal
- Friedberg, Germany

Vimoutiers

- Châtelet, Belgium
- Fordingbridge, England, United Kingdom
- Sontra, Germany

Vincennes

- Blackrock, Ireland
- Castrop-Rauxel, Germany
- Lambeth, England, United Kingdom
- Montigny-le-Tilleul, Belgium
- Tomar, Portugal
- Vincennes, United States

Vire-Normandie

- Baunatal, Germany
- Săcele, Romania
- Santa Fe, Spain
- Totnes, England, United Kingdom

Viry-Châtillon

- Erftstadt, Germany
- Wokingham, England, United Kingdom

Vitré

- Djenné, Mali
- Greece, United States
- Helmstedt, Germany
- Lymington, United Kingdom
- Środa Wielkopolska, Poland
- Tălmaciu, Romania
- Terrebonne, Canada
- Villajoyosa, Spain

Vitrolles

- Mörfelden-Walldorf, Germany

Vitry-sur-Seine

- Burnley, England, United Kingdom
- Kladno, Czech Republic
- Meissen, Germany

Voiron

- Bassano del Grappa, Italy
- Droitwich Spa, England, United Kingdom
- Herford (district), Germany
- Šibenik, Croatia

Voisins-le-Bretonneux

- Irvine, Scotland, United Kingdom
- Łuków, Poland
- Schenefeld, Germany

== W ==
Wasquehal

- Beyne-Heusay, Belgium

Wattrelos

- Eschweiler, Germany
- Guarda, Portugal
- Köthen, Germany
- Mohács, Hungary
- Siemianowice Śląskie, Poland
- Solca, Romania

== Y ==
Yerres

- Mendig, Germany
- Sainte-Brigitte-de-Laval, Canada

Yvetot

- Hemmingen, Germany
- Kyjov, Czech Republic
- Lanark, Scotland, United Kingdom
- Murowana Goślina, Poland

Yzeure

- Bendorf, Germany
- Gherla, Romania
- Kafountine, Senegal
