= Nioro =

Nioro may refer to

== Places ==
- Nioro du Sahel, a town in the Kayes Region of western Mali
- Nioro du Rip, a town in the southern Kaolack Region, Nioro du Rip Department, of Senegal
- Nioro Tougouné Rangabé
- Nioro Airport

== Names ==
- Nioro Cercle, an administrative subdivision of the Kayes Region of Mali (chef-lieu)
- Nioro Tougouné Rangabé

== Science ==
- Nioro, a taxonomic synonym for Stenomesius, a genus of wasps
