= Kouloudiengué =

- Village
- Location in Mali
- Coordinates: 14°26′50″N 8°22′25″W
- Country: Mali
- Region: Kayes Region
- Cercle: Diéma Cercle
- Commune: Gomitradougou
- Elevation: 283 m (928 ft)
- Time zone: UTC+0 (GMT)

Kouloudiengué is a village and principal settlement (chef-lieu) of the commune of Gomitradougou in the Cercle of Diéma in the Kayes Region of south-western Mali.

The village lies 97 km east of Diéma, Mali just to the north of the Route Nationale 1 (RN1) that links Kayes and the Malian capital Bamako.
