= Gogui =

Gogui may refer to:

- Gogui, Mali
- Gogui, Mauritania
