= Tamasgo =

Tamasgo may refer to:

- Tamasgo, Méguet, Burkina Faso
- Tamasgo, Zorgho, Burkina Faso
