= Aite =

Aite or AITE may refer to:

- Academy of Information Technology and Engineering
- Aïté, a village near Kayes in western Mali
- Alternate spelling of the Greek goddess Atë
