= Karakoro =

Karakoro may refer to:

- Karakoro, Ivory Coast
- Karakoro, Mali
- Karakoro River
