= Ouavoussé =

Ouavoussé may refer to:

- Ouavoussé, Méguet, Burkina Faso
- Ouavoussé, Zoungou, Burkina Faso
