= Lakamané =

- Commune and village
- Location in Mali
- Coordinates: 14.506°N 9.907°W
- Country: Mali
- Region: Kayes Region
- Cercle: Diéma Cercle

Area
  - Total: 1,000 km^{2} (390 sq mi)

Population (2009 census)
  - Total: 15,912
  - Density: 16/km^{2} (41/sq mi)
- Time zone: UTC+0 (GMT)

Lakamané is a rural commune and village in the Diéma Cercle in the Kayes Region of western Mali. The commune contains 16 villages. In the 2009 census the commune had a population of 15,912.
