= Sansankidé =

- Commune and village
- Location in Mali
- Coordinates: 14.422°N 9.961°W
- Country: Mali
- Region: Kayes Region
- Cercle: Diéma Cercle

Area
  - Total: 308 km^{2} (119 sq mi)

Population (2009 census)
  - Total: 6,520
  - Density: 21.2/km^{2} (54.8/sq mi)
- Time zone: UTC+0 (GMT)

Sansankidé is a rural commune and village in the Cercle of Diéma in the Kayes Region of western Mali. The commune includes the villages of Kamissakidé, Lecouraga, Léwa-Khassonké, Sambadigané, Sangha-Madina as well as Sansankidé, the administrative center (chef-lieu). In the 2009 census the commune had a population of 6,520.
