= Simbi (disambiguation) =

In traditional Bakongo spirituality, a simbi (pl. bisimbi) is a water spirit that can travel between the physical world (ku nseke) and the spiritual world (ku mpémbe), but may also refer to:

== People ==
- Simbi Ajikawo, English rapper, singer and actor who performs as Little Simz
- Patou Ebunga-Simbi, Congolese footballer
- Simbi Khali, American actress and singer-songwriter
- Simbi Mubako, Zimbabwean ambassador
- David Simbi, Zimbabwean engineer

== Other uses ==
- Simbi (band), a mizik rasin, or vodou roots, band from Göteborg, Sweden
- Simbi, Mali, a town and commune
- Simbing, also known as a simbi, African musical instrument
- Sometimes I Might Be Introvert, a 2021 album by Little Simz
