= Pimalga =

- Country: Burkina Faso
- Region: Plateau-Central Region
- Province: Ganzourgou
- Department: Méguet Department

Population (2019)
  - Total: 1,261

Pimalga is a village in the Méguet Department of Ganzourgou Province in central Burkina Faso.

The closest health center to Pimalga is the health and social promotion center (CSPS) of Méguet while the medical center with surgical branch (CMA) is located in Zorgho.

Population
Year	Pop.	±%
2006	769	—
2019	1,261	+64.0%
