= Vagma =

- Country: Burkina Faso
- Region: Plateau-Central Region
- Province: Ganzourgou
- Department: Méguet Department

Population (2019)
  - Total: 1,628

Vagma is a town in the Méguet Department of Ganzourgou Province in central Burkina Faso.

Population
Year	Pop.	±%
1985	1,349	—
2006	1,243	−7.9%
2019	1,628	+31.0%
