= Koulweogo =

- Location in Burkina Faso
- Coordinates: 12°19′N 0°39′W
- Country: Burkina Faso
- Region: Plateau-Central Region
- Province: Ganzourgou
- Department: Méguet Department

Population (2019)
  - Total: 2,227

Koulweogo is a town in the Méguet Department of Ganzourgou Province in central Burkina Faso.

Population
| Year | Pop. | ±% |
|---|---|---|
| 1985 | 2,035 | — |
| 2006 | 1,682 | −17.3% |
| 2019 | 2,227 | +32.4% |
