= Guédébiné =

- Commune and village
- Location in Mali
- Coordinates: 15.044°N 9.354°W
- Country: Mali
- Region: Kayes Region
- Cercle: Diéma Cercle

Area
  - Total: 225 km^{2} (87 sq mi)
- Elevation: 275 m (902 ft)

Population (2009 census)
  - Total: 5,106
  - Density: 22.7/km^{2} (58.8/sq mi)
- Time zone: UTC+0 (GMT)

Guédébiné is a rural commune and village in the Cercle of Diéma in the Kayes Region of western Mali. The commune contains the main village of Guédébiné as well as Néma, Diakamody, Diopi, Karsala and Goulambé. In the 2009 census the commune had a population of 5,106.
