= Méguet Department =

Coordinates: 12°25′N 0°43′W

Méguet
- Department
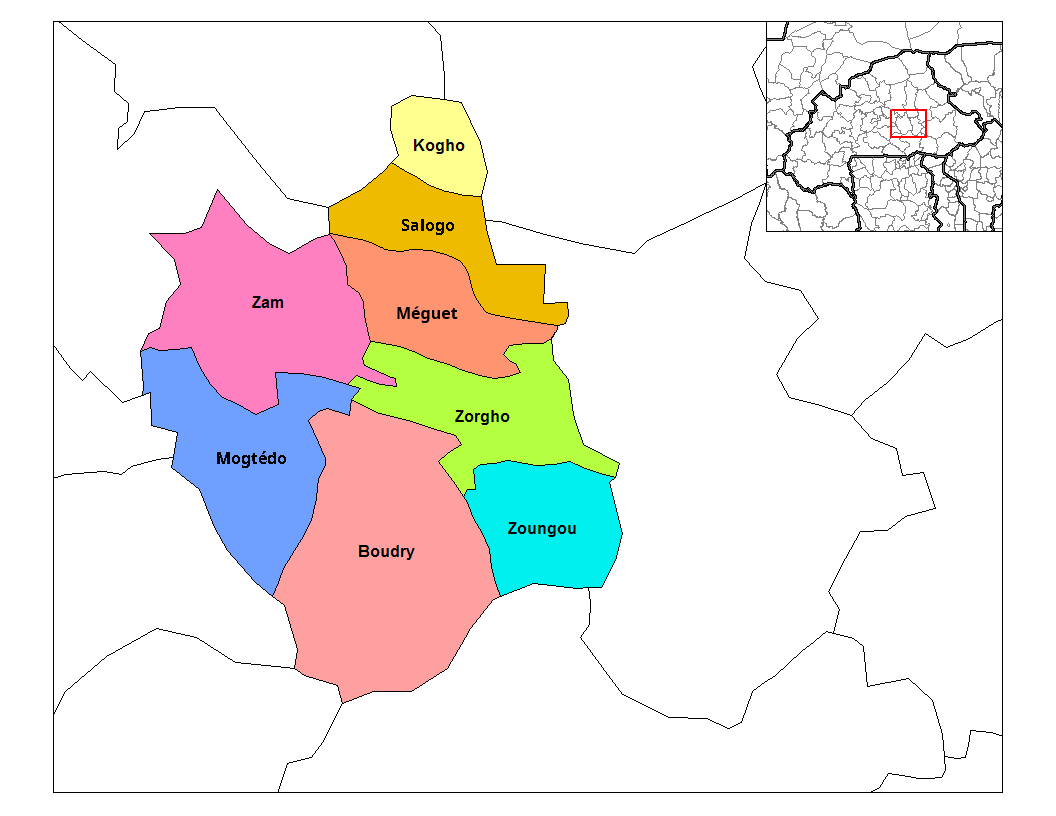
- Méguet Department location in the province
- Country: Burkina Faso
- Province: Ganzourgou Province

Population (1996)
  - Total: 34,668
- Time zone: UTC+0 (GMT 0)

Méguet is a department or commune of Ganzourgou Province in central-eastern Burkina Faso. Its capital lies at the town of Méguet. According to the 1996 census the department has a total population of 34,668.

== Towns and villages ==
- Méguet (7 273 inhabitants) (capital)
- Baghin (1 112 inhabitants)
- Bollé (1 100 inhabitants)
- Boulwando (1 710 inhabitants)
- Dazanré (783 inhabitants)
- Kabouda (1 498 inhabitants)
- Kakim (333 inhabitants)
- Kanré (1 743 inhabitants)
- Kougdoughin (1 318 inhabitants)
- Koulweogo (2 113 inhabitants)
- Lalmogo (524 inhabitants)
- Nahoubé (1 095 inhabitants)
- Ouavoussé (1 143 inhabitants)
- Pimalga (940 inhabitants)
- Pinré (2 023 inhabitants)
- Tamasgo (1 744 inhabitants)
- Tanghin (2 902 inhabitants)
- Tibin (1 753 inhabitants)
- Vagma (1 213 inhabitants)
- Yama (212 inhabitants)
- Zemalga (2 093 inhabitants)
