= Lalmogo =

Village in Burkina Faso

- Country: Burkina Faso
- Region: Plateau-Central Region
- Province: Ganzourgou
- Department: Méguet Department

Population (2019)
  - Total: 722

Lalmogo is a village in the Méguet Department of Ganzourgou Province in central Burkina Faso.

Population
Year	Pop.	±%
1985	327	—
2006	468	+43.1%
2019	722	+54.3%
