= Diaye Coura =

- Commune and town
- Location in Mali
- Coordinates: 15.180°N 9.984°W
- Country: Mali
- Region: Kayes Region
- Cercle: Nioro du Sahel Cercle

Population (2009 census)
  - Total: 13,691
- Time zone: UTC+0 (GMT)

Diaye Coura is a small town and commune in the Cercle of Nioro in the Kayes Region of western Mali.
