= Tibin =

Coordinates: 12.8881°N 2.2237°W

- Interactive map of Tibin
- Country: Burkina Faso
- Region: Plateau-Central Region
- Province: Ganzourgou
- Department: Méguet Department

Population (2019)
  - Total: 2,716

Tibin is a town in the Méguet Department of Ganzourgou Province in central Burkina Faso.

Population
Year	Pop.	±%
1985	1,429	—
2006	1,773	+24.1%
2019	2,716	+53.2%
