= Zemalga =

- Location within Burkina Faso
- Coordinates: 12.4114°N 0.7847°W
- Country: Burkina Faso
- Region: Plateau-Central Region
- Province: Ganzourgou
- Department: Méguet Department

Population (2019)
  - Total: 4,012

Zemalga is a town in the Méguet Department of Ganzourgou Province in central Burkina Faso.

Population
Year	Pop.	±%
1985	1,326	—
2006	3,579	+169.9%
2019	4,012	+12.1%
