= Tourougoumbé =

Touroungoumbé
- Commune and town
- Location in Mali
- Country: Mali
- Region: Kayes Region
- Cercle: Nioro Cercle

Population (2009 census)
  - Total: 11,412

Tourougoumbé (also Trougoumbé) is a town and urban commune in Nioro Cercle in the Kayes Region of western Mali. The town lies 45 kilometres (28 mi) east of Nioro du Sahel.
