= Nahoubé =

- Location in Burkina Faso
- Coordinates: 12°27′N 0°39′W
- Country: Burkina Faso
- Region: Plateau-Central Region
- Province: Ganzourgou
- Department: Méguet Department

Population (2019)
  - Total: 1,739

Nahoubé (or Naoubé) is a town in the Méguet Department of Ganzourgou Province in central Burkina Faso.

Population
Year	Pop.	±%
1985	916	—
2006	1,229	+34.2%
2019	1,739	+41.5%
