= Gomitradougou =

- Commune
- Location in Mali
- Coordinates: 14.448°N 8.373°W
- Country: Mali
- Region: Kayes Region
- Cercle: Diéma Cercle
- Admin HQ (Chef-lieu): Kouloudiengué

Area
  - Total: 656 km^{2} (253 sq mi)

Population (2009 census)
  - Total: 7,287
  - Density: 11.1/km^{2} (28.8/sq mi)
- Time zone: UTC+0 (GMT)

Gomitradougou is a rural commune in the Cercle of Diéma in the Kayes Region of western Mali. The commune includes the villages of Gomitra, Wattaye, Kouloudienguè, Missira, Bassibougou, Sébabougou, Niamakoro and N’Tallabougou. The main village (chef-lieu) is Kouloudiengué. In the 2009 census the commune had a population of 7,287.
