= Dioumara Koussata =

- Commune and village
- Location in Mali
- Coordinates: 14.540°N 8.568°W
- Country: Mali
- Region: Kayes Region
- Cercle: Diéma Cercle

Area
  - Total: 1,820 km^{2} (700 sq mi)

Population (2009 census)
  - Total: 16,218
  - Density: 8.91/km^{2} (23.1/sq mi)
- Time zone: UTC+0 (GMT)

Dioumara Koussata is a rural commune and village in the Cercle of Diéma in the Kayes Region of western Mali. Dioumara Koussata is one of 18 villages in the commune. In the 2009 census the commune had a population of 16,218.
