= Kadiaba Kadiel =

- Commune and village
- Location in Mali
- Coordinates: 15°7′46″N 9°39′5″W
- Country: Mali
- Region: Kayes Region
- Cercle: Nioro Cercle

Population (2009 census)
  - Total: 11,710
- Time zone: UTC+0 (GMT)

Kadiaba Kadiel (or Gadiaba Kadiel ) is a village and rural commune in the Cercle of Nioro in the Kayes Region of western Mali.

The commune includes eight settlements:

- Alana Massassi
- Fossé-Kaarta
- Gadiaba Boundounké
- Gadiaba-Dialla
- Gadiaba-Kadiel
- Gadiaba M’Bomoyabé
- Gourel–Céno–Dédji
- Sanbagoré
