= Baghin, Burkina Faso =

Baghin
- Town
- Country: Burkina Faso
- Region: Plateau-Central Region
- Province: Ganzourgou
- Department: Méguet Department

Population (2019)
  - Total: 1,469

Baghin is a town in the Méguet Department of Ganzourgou Province in central Burkina Faso.

Population
Year	Pop.	±%
1985	1,078	—
2006	1,123	+4.2%
2019	1,469	+30.8%
