= Baniéré Koré =

- Commune and village
- Location in Mali
- Coordinates: 15°12′26″N 9°9′6″W
- Country: Mali
- Region: Kayes Region
- Cercle: Nioro Cercle

Population (2009 census)
  - Total: 9,044
- Time zone: UTC+0 (GMT)

Baniéré Koré is a commune and village in the Cercle of Nioro in the Kayes Region of south-western Mali.
