= Kougdoughin =

Kougdoughin Kougdouguin
- Location in Burkina Faso
- Coordinates: 12°29′N 0°46′W
- Country: Burkina Faso
- Region: Plateau-Central Region
- Province: Ganzourgou
- Department: Méguet Department

Population (2019)
  - Total: 1,477

Kougdoughin (or Kougoudouguen) is a town in the Méguet Department of Ganzourgou Province in central Burkina Faso.

Population
Year	Pop.	±%
1985	1,079	—
2006	893	−17.2%
2019	1,477	+65.4%
