= Fassoudébé =

- Commune and village
- Location in Mali
- Coordinates: 15.119°N 9.435°W
- Country: Mali
- Region: Kayes Region
- Cercle: Diéma Cercle

Area
  - Total: 150 km^{2} (58 sq mi)

Population (2009 census)
  - Total: 5,120
  - Density: 34/km^{2} (88/sq mi)
- Time zone: UTC+0 (GMT)

Fassoudébé is a rural commune and village in the Cercle of Diéma in the Kayes Region of western Mali. The commune contains 3 villages and 3 hamlets. In the 2009 census the commune had a population of 5,120.
