= Yéréré =

- Commune and town
- Location in Mali
- Coordinates: 15.259°N 9.427°W
- Country: Mali
- Region: Kayes Region
- Cercle: Nioro Cercle

Area
  - Total: 300 km^{2} (120 sq mi)

Population (2009 census)
  - Total: 14,408
  - Density: 48/km^{2} (120/sq mi)
- Time zone: UTC+0 (GMT)

Yéréré is a small town and commune in the Cercle of Nioro in the Kayes Region of western Mali. The commune lies on the border with Mauritania.
