= Grouméra =

- Commune and village
- Location in Mali
- Coordinates: 14°49′42″N 9°8′24″W
- Country: Mali
- Region: Kayes Region
- Cercle: Diéma Cercle

Area
  - Total: 627 km^{2} (242 sq mi)

Population (2009 census)
  - Total: 11,648
  - Density: 18.6/km^{2} (48.1/sq mi)
- Time zone: UTC+0 (GMT)

Grouméra is a rural commune and village in the Cercle of Diéma in the Kayes Region of western Mali. As well as Grouméra the commune contains seven other villages. In the 2009 census the commune had a population of 11,648.
