= Koréra Koré =

- Commune and town
- Location in Mali
- Coordinates: 15.142°N 8.955°W
- Country: Mali
- Region: Kayes Region
- Cercle: Nioro Cercle

Area
  - Total: 8,086 km^{2} (3,122 sq mi)

Population (2009 census)
  - Total: 19,598
  - Density: 2.424/km^{2} (6.277/sq mi)
- Time zone: UTC+0 (GMT)

Koréra Koré is a small town and rural commune in the Cercle of Nioro in the Kayes Region of western Mali.
