= Aourou =

- Town
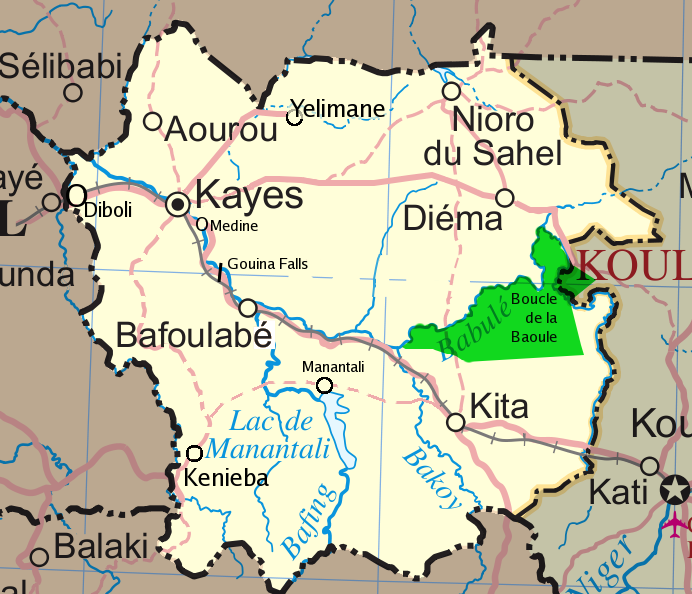
- Regional map

- Location in Mali
- Coordinates: 14°57′53″N 11°35′8″W
- Country: Mali
- Region: Kayes Region
- Cercle: Kayes Cercle
- Commune: Djélébou
- Time zone: UTC+0 (GMT)

Aourou is a small town and principal settlement of the commune of Djélébou in the Cercle of Kayes in the Kayes Region of southwestern Mali.
