= Diabigue =

Coordinates: 15°09′N 9°19′W

- Commune and town
- Interactive map of Diabigue
- Country: Mali
- Region: Kayes Region
- Cercle: Nioro du Sahel Cercle

Population (1998)
  - Total: 16,107
- Time zone: UTC+0 (GMT)

Diabigue is a small town and commune in the Cercle of Nioro du Sahel in the Kayes Region of south-western Mali. In 1998 the commune had a population of 16107.
