= Youri, Mali =

Youri Youri Taxiiné(Takhiinné)
- Commune and town
- Location in Mali
- Coordinates: 15°6′25″N 9°48′40″W
- Country: Mali
- Region: Kayes Region
- Cercle: Nioro du Sahel Cercle

Population (2009 census)
  - Total: 6,721
- Time zone: UTC+0 (GMT)

Youri is a small town and urban commune in the Cercle of Nioro du Sahel in the Kayes Region of southwestern Mali. In the 2009 census the commune had a population of 6,721.
