= Guétéma =

- Commune and town
- Location in Mali
- Coordinates: 15°07′N 9°35′W
- Country: Mali
- Region: Kayes Region
- Cercle: Nioro Cercle

Population (2009 census)
  - Total: 8,049
- Time zone: UTC+0 (GMT)

Guétéma is a small town and commune in the Cercle of Nioro in the Kayes Region of south-western Mali.
