= Dazanré =

- Location in Burkina Faso
- Coordinates: 12°22′N 0°44′W
- Country: Burkina Faso
- Region: Plateau-Central Region
- Province: Ganzourgou
- Department: Méguet Department

Population (2019)
  - Total: 982

Dazanré is a village in the Méguet Department of Ganzourgou Province in central Burkina Faso.

Population
Year	Pop.	±%
1985	819	—
2006	807	−1.5%
2019	982	+21.7%
