= Sandare =

Coordinates: 14°42′N 10°18′W

- Commune and town
- Interactive map of Sandare
- Country: Mali
- Region: Kayes Region
- Cercle: Nioro du Sahel Cercle

Population (1998)
  - Total: 18,328
- Time zone: UTC+0 (GMT)

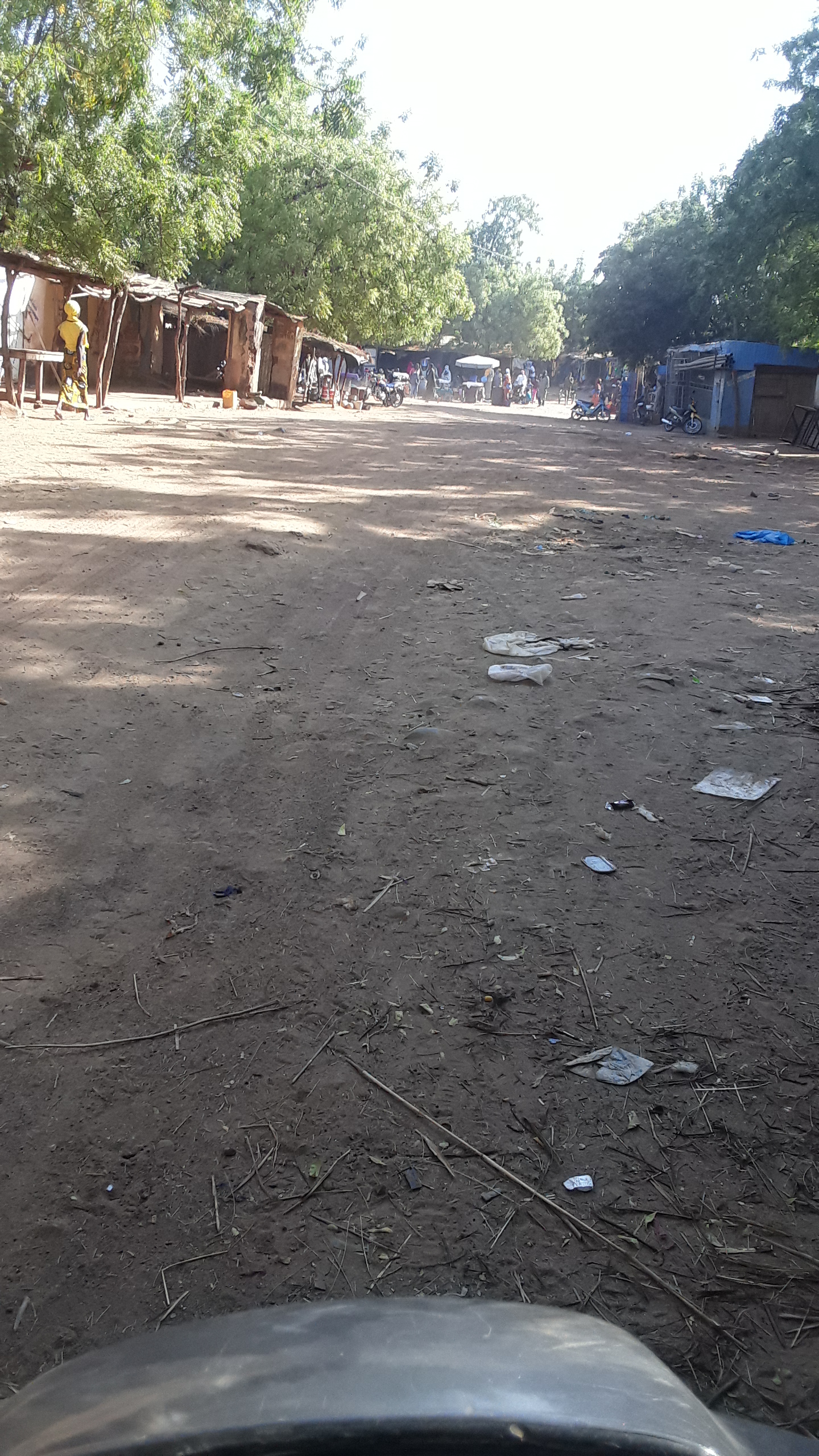
Sandaré

Sandare is a small town and commune in the Cercle of Nioro du Sahel in the Kayes Region of south-western Mali. In 1998 the commune had a population of 18328.
