= Kakim =

- Country: Burkina Faso
- Region: Plateau-Central Region
- Province: Ganzourgou
- Department: Méguet Department

Population (2019)
  - Total: 659

Kakim is a village in the Méguet Department of Ganzourgou Province in central Burkina Faso.

Population
Year	Pop.	±%
2006	385	—
2019	659	+71.2%
