= Boulwando =

- Location in Burkina Faso
- Coordinates: 12°26′N 0°46′W
- Country: Burkina Faso
- Region: Plateau-Central Region
- Province: Ganzourgou
- Department: Méguet Department

Population (2019)
  - Total: 2,758

Boulwando is a town in the Méguet Department of Ganzourgou Province in central Burkina Faso.

Population
Year	Pop.	±%
1985	1,567	—
2006	1,867	+19.1%
2019	2,758	+47.7%
