= Teichibe =

- Village
- Location in Mali
- Coordinates: 15°16′30″N 11°42′25″W
- Country: Mali
- Region: Kayes Region
- Cercle: Kayes Cercle
- Commune: Karakoro
- Time zone: UTC+0 (GMT)

Teichibe is a village and principal settlement (chef-lieu) of the commune of Karakoro in the Cercle of Kayes in the Kayes Region of south-western Mali.
