= Méguet =

- Alternative map showing location within Burkina Faso
- Coordinates: 12°25′N 0°43′W
- Country: Burkina Faso
- Region: Plateau-Central Region
- Province: Ganzourgou Province
- Department: Méguet Department

Population (2019)
  - Total: 11,235
- Time zone: UTC+0 (GMT)

Méguet is the capital of the Méguet Department in Ganzourgou Province in central Burkina Faso.

Population
Year	Pop.	±%
1985	2,342	—
2006	6,340	+170.7%
2019	11,235	+77.2%
