= Gavinane =

- Commune and town
- Location in Mali
- Coordinates: 15°7′N 9°54′W
- Country: Mali
- Region: Kayes Region
- Cercle: Nioro du Sahel Cercle

Population (1998)
  - Total: 21,986
- Time zone: UTC+0 (GMT)

Gavinane is a small town and commune in the Cercle of Nioro du Sahel in the Kayes Region of south-western Mali. In 1998 the commune had a population of 21,986.
