= Gogui, Mali =

Gogui
- Commune and town
- Nickname: Home of Gogimal

- Location in Mali
- Coordinates: 15°41′9″N 9°19′47″W
- Country: Mali
- Region: Kayes Region
- Cercle: Nioro du Sahel Cercle

Population (2023 census)
  - Total: 21,000
- Time zone: UTC+0 (GMT)

Gogui is a small town and rural commune in the Cercle of Nioro du Sahel in the Kayes Region of western Mali. The town is on the border with Mauritania.
