= Nioro Cercle =

Coordinates: 15°05′N 9°45′W

Nioro
- Cercle
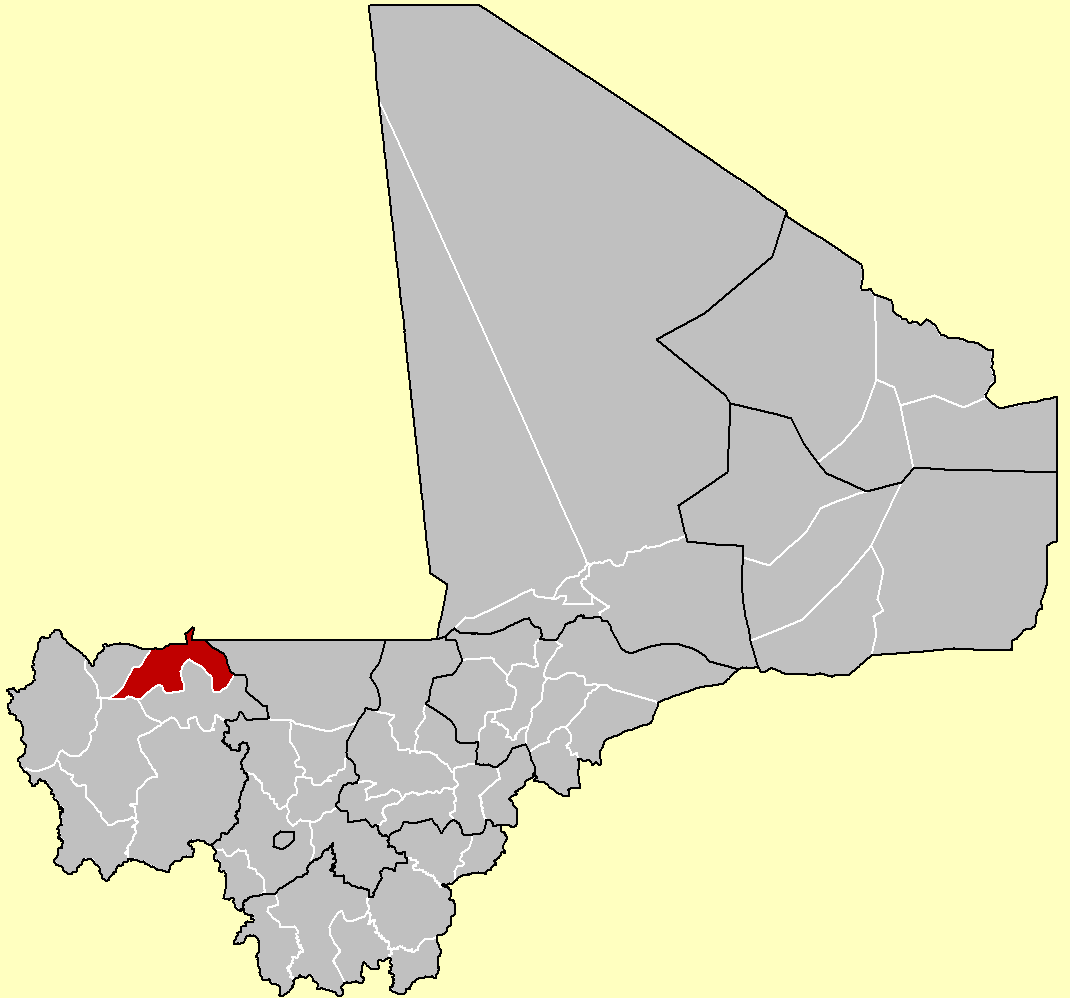
- Location of Nioro Cercle in Mali
- Country: Mali
- Region: Kayes Region
- Admin HQ (Chef-lieu): Nioro du Sahel

Area
  - Total: 11,060 km^{2} (4,270 sq mi)

Population (2009 census)
  - Total: 230,488
  - Density: 20.84/km^{2} (53.97/sq mi)
- Time zone: UTC+0 (GMT)

Nioro Cercle is an administrative subdivision of the Kayes Region of Mali. Its administrative center (chef-lieu) is the town of Nioro du Sahel. The commune is on the Mauritanian border and has long been a major stop on the trans-Saharan trade.

The cercle is divided into 16 communes:

- Baniéré Koré
- Diabigué
- Diarra
- Diaye Coura
- Gadiaba Kadiel
- Gavinané
- Gogui
- Guétéma
- Koréra Koré
- Nioro du Sahel
- Nioro Tougouné Rangabé
- Sandaré
- Simbi
- Trougoumbé
- Yéréré
- Youri
