= Karakoro, Mali =

Karakoro
- Commune
- Location in Mali
- Coordinates: 15°16′30″N 11°42′25″W
- Country: Mali
- Region: Kayes Region
- Cercle: Kayes Cercle

Population (2009 census)
  - Total: 14,813
- Time zone: UTC+0 (GMT)

Karakoro is a commune in the Cercle of Kayes in the Kayes Region of south-western Mali. The commune contains seven villages: Teichibé, Souena Toucouleur, Souena Gandéga, Souena Soumaré, Boutinguisse, Kalinioro and Aïté. The main village (chef-lieu) is Teichibe. In 2009 the commune had a population of 14,813.
