= Simbi, Mali =

Coordinates: 14°06′54″N 10°34′07″W

- Commune and town
- Interactive map of Simbi, Mali
- Country: Mali
- Region: Kayes Region
- Cercle: Nioro du Sahel Cercle

Population (1998)
  - Total: 15,658
- Time zone: UTC+0 (GMT)

Simbi, Mali is a small town and commune in the Cercle of Nioro du Sahel in the Kayes Region of south-western Mali. In 1998 the commune had a population of 15658.
