= Dianguirdé =

- Commune and town
- Location in Mali
- Coordinates: 14°29′19″N 9°00′58″W
- Country: Mali
- Region: Kayes Region
- Cercle: Diéma Cercle
- Elevation: 254 m (833 ft)

Population (2009 census)
  - Total: 12,684
- Time zone: UTC+0 (GMT)

Dianguirdé is a rural commune and small town in the Cercle of Diéma in the Kayes Region of western Mali. The commune contains 14 villages and hamlets. In the 2009 census the commune had a population of 12,684.
