= Tamasgo, Méguet =

Tamasgo
- Country: Burkina Faso
- Region: Plateau-Central Region
- Province: Ganzourgou
- Department: Méguet Department

Population (2019)
  - Total: 2,607

Tamasgo is a town in the Méguet Department of Ganzourgou Province in central Burkina Faso.

Population
Year	Pop.	±%
1985	675	—
2006	1,840	+172.6%
2019	2,607	+41.7%
