= Nioro Tougouné Rangabé =

- Commune and town
- Location in Mali
- Coordinates: 15.220°N 8.854°W
- Country: Mali
- Region: Kayes Region
- Cercle: Nioro du Sahel Cercle

Population (2009 census)
  - Total: 11,510
- Time zone: UTC+0 (GMT)

Nioro Tougouné Rangabé (also Nioro Tougouné Rangaba) is a small town and commune in the Cercle of Nioro in the Kayes Region of south-western Mali.
