= Kabouda =

- Location in Burkina Faso
- Coordinates: 12°22′N 0°43′W
- Country: Burkina Faso
- Region: Plateau-Central Region
- Province: Ganzourgou
- Department: Méguet Department

Population (2019)
  - Total: 1,838

Kabouda is a town in the Méguet Department of Ganzourgou Province in central Burkina Faso.

Population
Year	Pop.	±%
1985	1,272	—
2006	1,219	−4.2%
2019	1,838	+50.8%
