= Ouavoussé, Méguet =

Ouavoussé
- Location in Burkina Faso
- Coordinates: 12°21′N 0°45′W
- Country: Burkina Faso
- Region: Plateau-Central Region
- Province: Ganzourgou
- Department: Méguet Department

Population (2019)
  - Total: 1,366

Ouavoussé is a town in the Méguet Department of Ganzourgou Province in central Burkina Faso.

Population
Year	Pop.	±%
1985	1,020	—
2006	973	−4.6%
2019	1,366	+40.4%
