= Djélébou =

- Commune
- Location in Mali
- Coordinates: 14°57′53″N 11°35′8″W
- Country: Mali
- Region: Kayes Region
- Cercle: Kayes Cercle

Population (2009 census)
  - Total: 24,674
- Time zone: UTC+0 (GMT)

Djélébou is a commune in the Cercle of Kayes in the Kayes Region of south-western Mali. The principal town (chef-lieu) is Aourou. In 2009 the commune had a population of 24,674.
