= Aïté =

Haïté
- Ville
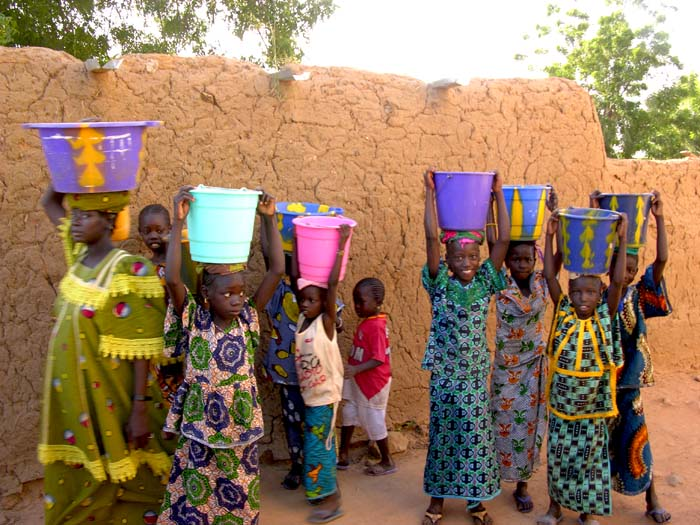
- Haïté villagers.

- Location in Mali
- Coordinates: 15°5′N 11°39′W
- Country: Mali
- Region: Kayes Region
- Cercle: Kayes Cercle
- Commune: Kayes
- Time zone: UTC+0 (GMT)

Haïté is a village in the Cercle of Kayes in the Kayes Region of south-western Mali. It is located north of Kayes city.

The village has had problems with drought affecting harvests.
