= Diéma, Mali =

Diéma
- Commune and town
- Location in Mali
- Coordinates: 14.539°N 9.190°W
- Country: Mali
- Region: Kayes Region
- Cercle: Diéma Cercle

Area
  - Total: 1,183 km^{2} (457 sq mi)

Population (2009 census)
  - Total: 30,592
  - Density: 25.86/km^{2} (66.98/sq mi)
- Time zone: UTC+0 (GMT)

Diéma is a rural commune and small town in the Cercle of Diéma in the Kayes Region of western Mali. Diéma is also the administrative center (chef-lieu) of the Diéma Cercle. As well as the main town, the commune contains the villages of Tinkaré, Kana, Fangouné Bambara, Fangouné Kagoro, Fangouné Massassi, Dampa, Bougoudéré Niandé, Bougoudéré Mahomet, Bilibani, Mambourké, Madina-Maure and Nafadji. In the 2009 census the commune had a population of 30,592.
