= Diéma Cercle =

Coordinates: 14°35′N 9°15′W

Diéma
- Cercle
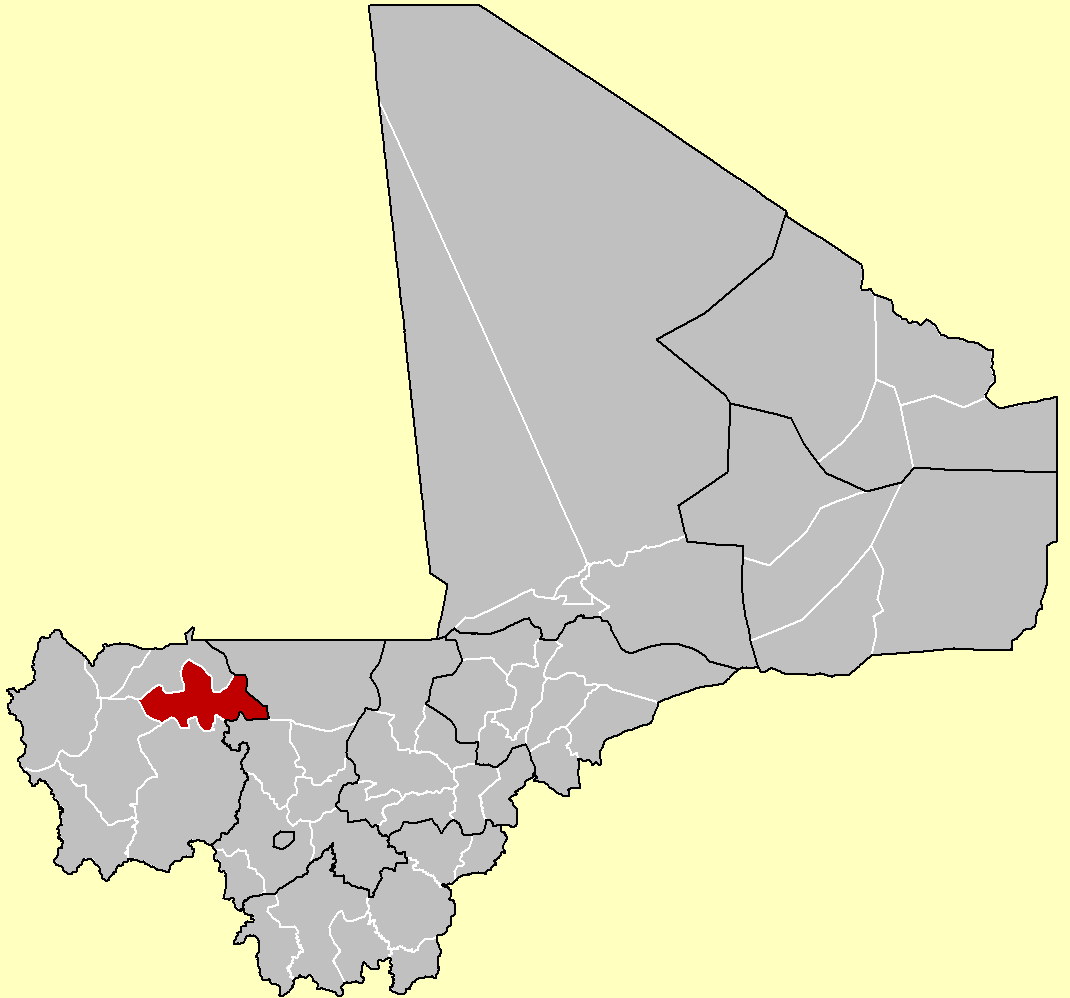
- Location of Diéma Cercle in Mali
- Country: Mali
- Region: Kayes Region
- Admin HQ (Chef-lieu): Diéma

Area
  - Total: 12,440 km^{2} (4,800 sq mi)

Population (2009)
  - Total: 212,062
  - Density: 17.05/km^{2} (44.15/sq mi)
- Time zone: UTC+0 (GMT)

Diéma Cercle is an administrative subdivision of the Kayes Region of Mali. Its administrative center (chef-lieu) is the small town of Diéma. The Cercle is divided into one urban commune and fourteen rural communes. In the 2009 census the cercle had a population of 212,062.

The cercle is divided into (7) communes:

- Dianguirdé
- Diéma
- Dioumara Koussata
- Fassoudébé
- Gomitradougou
- Grouméra
- Guédébiné
