= Yoba =

Yoba may refer to:

- Yoba, Burkina Faso, a village in northern Burkina Faso
- Yoba language, an extinct Austronesian language of Papua New Guinea
- Malik Yoba, an American actor
- Baked Alaska (livestreamer), an American far-right media personality sometimes referred to as YOBA

== See also ==
- Yobaz
- Yob (disambiguation)
