= Boubou =

Boubou can refer to:

- Boubou (clothing), a type of clothing worn in West Africa
- Boubou, Burkina Faso, a town
- Boubou Diallo, Malian footballer
- Boubou Macoutes, from "Boubou", the nickname of Premier Robert Bourassa
- Laniarius (boubous or gonoleks), a genus of passerine birds
