= Hayko Cepkin =

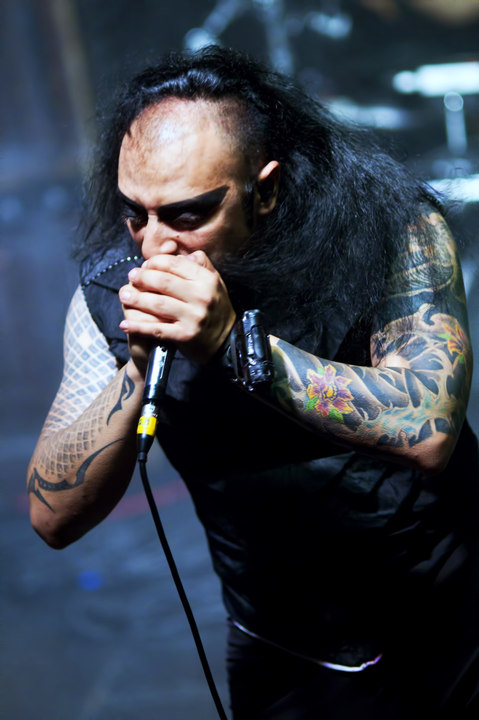
- Cepkin performing in 2011

Background information
- Born: 11 March 1978 (age 48)
- Origin: Yozgat, Turkey
- Genres: Alternative metal, Anatolian rock, industrial metal, post-hardcore, Folk metal
- Occupations: Singer, musician
- Instruments: Vocals, keyboards
- Years active: 1997–present
- Label: EMI
- Website: haykocepkin.com

Hayko Cepkin (born 11 March 1978) is a Turkish musician of Armenian descent.

== Beginnings ==
Hayko Cepkin has shared the stage with the likes of Kurban, Öztürk, Birol Namoğlu, Ogün Sanlısoy, Aylin Aslım, Koray Candemir and Demir Demirkan. Some of these artists have regularly contributed to his albums as well. He has also worked as a composer, and composed and arranged the Yeni Türkü "Kimdi Giden" on Murathan Mungan's album Söz Vermiş Şarkılar, which was song by Aylin Aslım. He also had a duet with Ogün Sanlısoy on the song "Korkma". He was also involved in Sanlısoy's album as a keyboard player for the song "Kaybettik Severken". He released his debut solo album titled Sakin Olmam Lazım, which was made entirely in his home studio, in June 2005.

== Other ventures ==
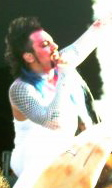
Hayko Cepkin performing at Rock'n Coke

Cepkin has organized and appeared in many events in relation to his music career. In 2006, 2007 and 2009 he participated in the Rock'n Coke and 2007 took part in Rock Müzikaller and Van için Rock. He composed the soundtrack for the movie Araf, and his song "Son Kez" from the album Sakin Olmam Lazım was featured on the movie's soundtrack as well. At the same time, he portrayed the character of "İsfandiyar" in the fantasy drama movie Çocuk in 2008.

In Ramadan, Cepkin recorded the song "Demedim mi?" for TRT, the lyrics of which were written by Pir Sultan Abdal. A music video was later shot for the song.

In 2010, he was a judge on Rock'n Dark. At the series' final on 30 April 2010, he performed on stage together with Anneke van Giersbergen. He then took part in Sonisphere festival.

In April 2014, within the framework of the "Ünlüler Etapta" organization, he co-piloted alongside Tunç Tuncer in the Aegean Rally.

== Lawsuits ==
On 3 August 2009, in response to the question "How do you find Hayko Cepkin?" in a program on Cine5, Davut Güloğlu said "He looks like a monkey, as if he has come out of a horror movie, it's not clear whether he looks like a cat or a dog, the likes of him are buffoons, if I see something like him at night, I would definitely attack it." After his comments, Cepkin took a case to the court and filed a lawsuit on the grounds of "personal offense" and demanded 2 years in prison as punishment for Davut Güloğlu.

In a press statement sent through his lawyer, Cepkin said that he had filed a lawsuit against Güloğlu by taking the case to the prosecutor. He referred to Güloğlu’s remarks, noting that they included severe insults, threats, and statements inciting violence against him, and that they attempted to portray him as belonging to a socially unacceptable group, effectively making him a target. The case was made open to the public and press, and the court decided to stop the trial after a while.

== Discography ==
Albums

- 2005: Sakin Olmam Lazım
- 2007: Tanışma Bitti
- 2010: Sandık
- 2012: Aşkın Izdırabını...
- 2016: Beni Büyüten Şarkılar Vol.1
- 2020: Karantina Günlüğü (with Burak Malçok)

EPs

- 2019: Kabul Olur / Dans Et

Singles

- 2018: "Azad" (with Cenk Durmazel)
- 2020: "Hayvaaağ1n"
- 2020: "Tutacağım Ellerini" (with Cem Adrian and Halil Sezai)
- 2022: "Destina" (Yeni Türkü Zamansız)

== Filmography ==
- 2005 – Balans ve Manevra
- 2008 – Çocuk
- 2009 – İstenmeyen Tüyler
- 2009 – 1 Erkek 1 Kadın
- 2012 – Acayip Hikayeler

== Television ==
- 2010 – Gecekondu – Supporting role/Star TV
- 2011 – Extreme-G – Presenter/CNN Türk
- 2012 – Acayip Hikayeler – Presenter/Star TV
- 2012 – Kulaktan Kulağa – Guest artist/Trt Müzik
- 2014 – Arkadaşım Hoşgeldin – Guest artist/Kanal D
- 2014 – Extreme – Presenter/Dream TV
- 2014 – Kardeş Payı – (22nd episode, supporting role)
- 2016 – Güldür Güldür Show – Guest artist/Show TV

== Theater ==
- 2021 – Jekyll & Hyde (musical) – Henry Jekyll/Edward Hyde
- 2024 – Dracula – Van Helsing
