= Zano =

Zano may refer to:

== People ==
- Brandon Zano, former member of Downplay, an American alternative metal band
- Moris Zano (born 1958), Israeli former footballer
- Nick Zano (born 1978), American actor
- Tzazo (died 533), also known as Zano, brother of King Gelimer, the last Germanic ruler of the North African Vandal Kingdom
- Zano Wast (1916–1988), American basketball player

== Places ==
- Zano, Bam, Burkina Faso, a village
- Zano, Boulgou, Burkina Faso, a town

== Other uses ==
- Zano (drone), a failed quadcopter drone Kickstarter project
- Aero Zano (airline code: ZANO), a Mexican airline - see List of airline codes
- Zano (blockchain platform), an open-source cryptocurrency and privacy-focused blockchain ecosystem.
