= Zano, Burkina Faso =

Zano, Burkina Faso may refer to:

- Zano, Bam, Burkina Faso
- Zano, Boulgou, Burkina Faso
