= Hamdallaye =

Hamdallaye may refer to:

- Hamdallaye, Burkina Faso, a village in Tikare Department, Bam Province, Burkina Faso
- Hamdallaye, Mali, a village in Mali and the former capital of the Masina Empire
- Hamdallaye, Niger, a village and commune in Niger
- Hamdallaye is a neighbourhood of Bamako
- Hamdallaye is a neighbourhood of Conakry
