= Tikaré Department =

Department in Bam Province, Burkina Faso

Coordinates: 13°17′29″N 1°43′34″W

Tikare
- Department
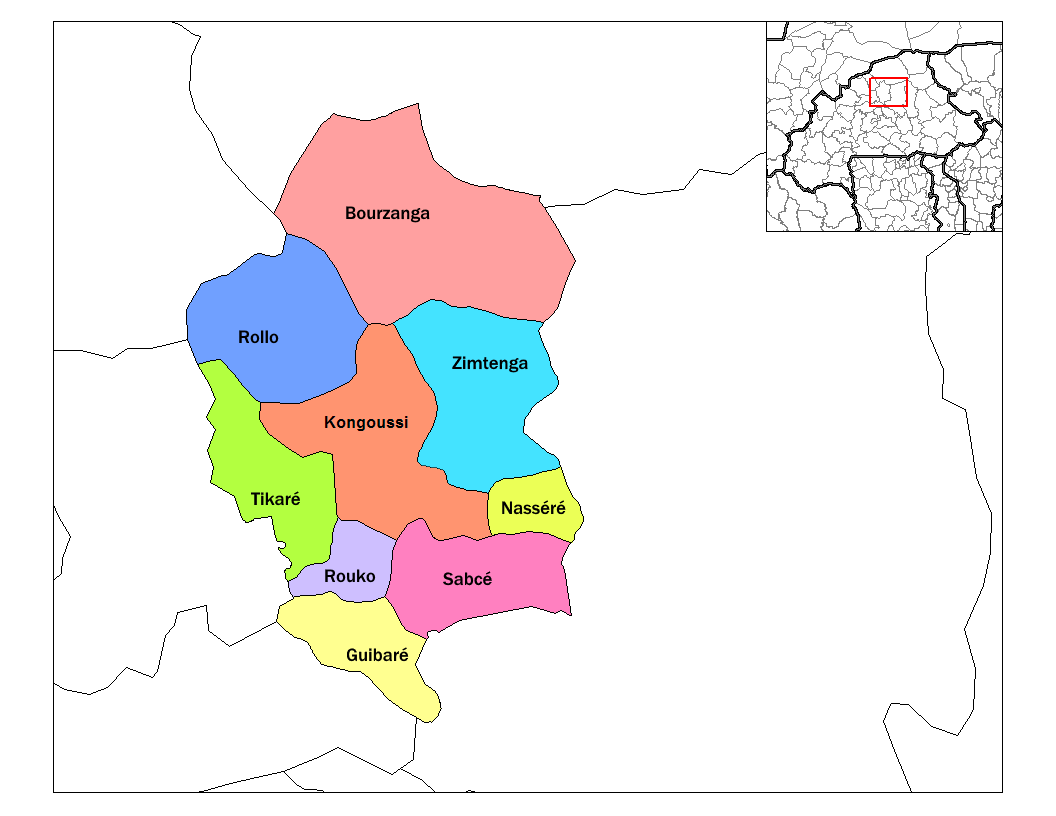
- Tikare Department location in the province
- Country: Burkina Faso
- Region: Centre-Nord Region
- Province: Bam Province

Area
  - Total: 150.6 sq mi (390.1 km^{2})

Population (2019 census)
  - Total: 52,263
  - Density: 347.0/sq mi (134.0/km^{2})
- Time zone: UTC+0 (GMT 0)

Tikare is a department or commune of Bam Province in north-western Burkina Faso. Its capital lies at the town of Tikare. According to the 2019 census the department has a total population of 52,263.

== Towns and villages ==
· Tikaré · Ansouri · Baribsi · Boubou · Dafire · Dargouma · Gasongo · Gonga · Hamdallaye · Horé · Ipala · Kamtenga · Kilou · Koulniéré · Manégtaba-Foulbé · Manégtaba-Mossi · Napalgué · Ouampèga · Oui · Ritimyinga · Sancé · Sarkounga · Songodin · Soukoundougou · Tamiga · Tampèlga · Tanhoka · Téonsgo · Tirbou · Touga · Vato-Foulbé · Vato-Mossi · Yelkoto · Yoba · Zamsé · Zano
