= Gonga =

Gonga may refer to:

- Gonga, Bam, Burkina Faso
- Gonga, Comoé, Burkina Faso
- Gonga (band), a British rock band
- Gonga languages of Ethiopia
