= George Marino =

American mastering engineer (1947–2012)

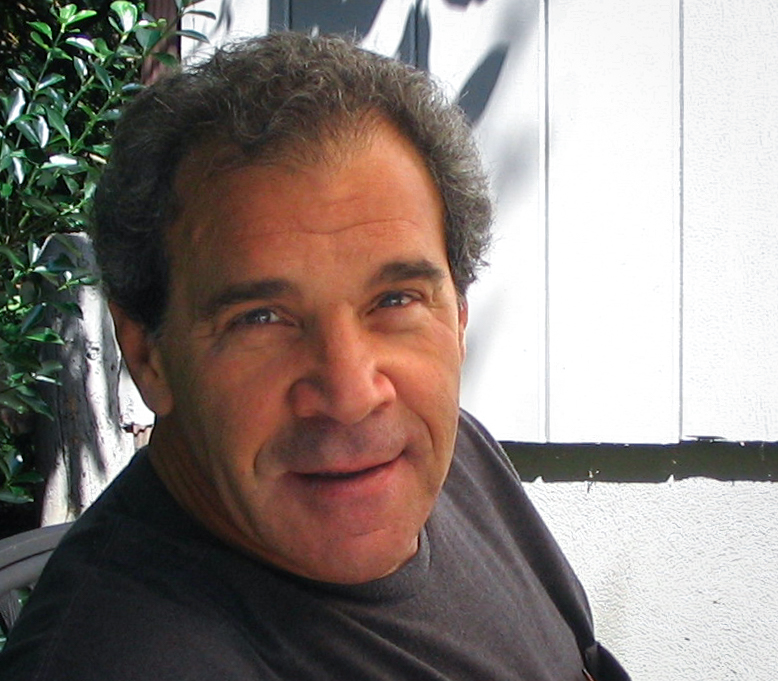
- Marino in 2007

Background information
- Born: April 15, 1947; New York City, U.S.
- Died: June 4, 2012 (aged 65)
- Occupation: Mastering engineer
- Years active: 1967–2012

George Marino (April 15, 1947 – June 4, 2012) was an American mastering engineer known for working on albums by rock bands starting in the late 1960s.

== Biography ==
Marino was born on April 15, 1947, in the New York City borough The Bronx. He attended Christopher Columbus High School there and learned to play the saxophone and bass fiddle in the high school band and was classically trained on guitar. Marino broke into the music business as a guitarist playing rock and roll in local New York City bands such as The Chancellors and The New Sounds Ltd. until most of the band members were drafted into the service for the war in Vietnam.

In 1967, Marino landed his first job in the industry as a librarian and assistant at Capitol Studios. Soon after, he apprenticed in the mastering department alongside of Joe Lansky, cutting rock, pop, jazz and classical albums. There, in 1968, he met his future wife, Rose Gross, whom he married in 1973. Gross became Clive Davis' assistant a few months before he started Arista Records in 1974, and she remained his assistant for 26 years.

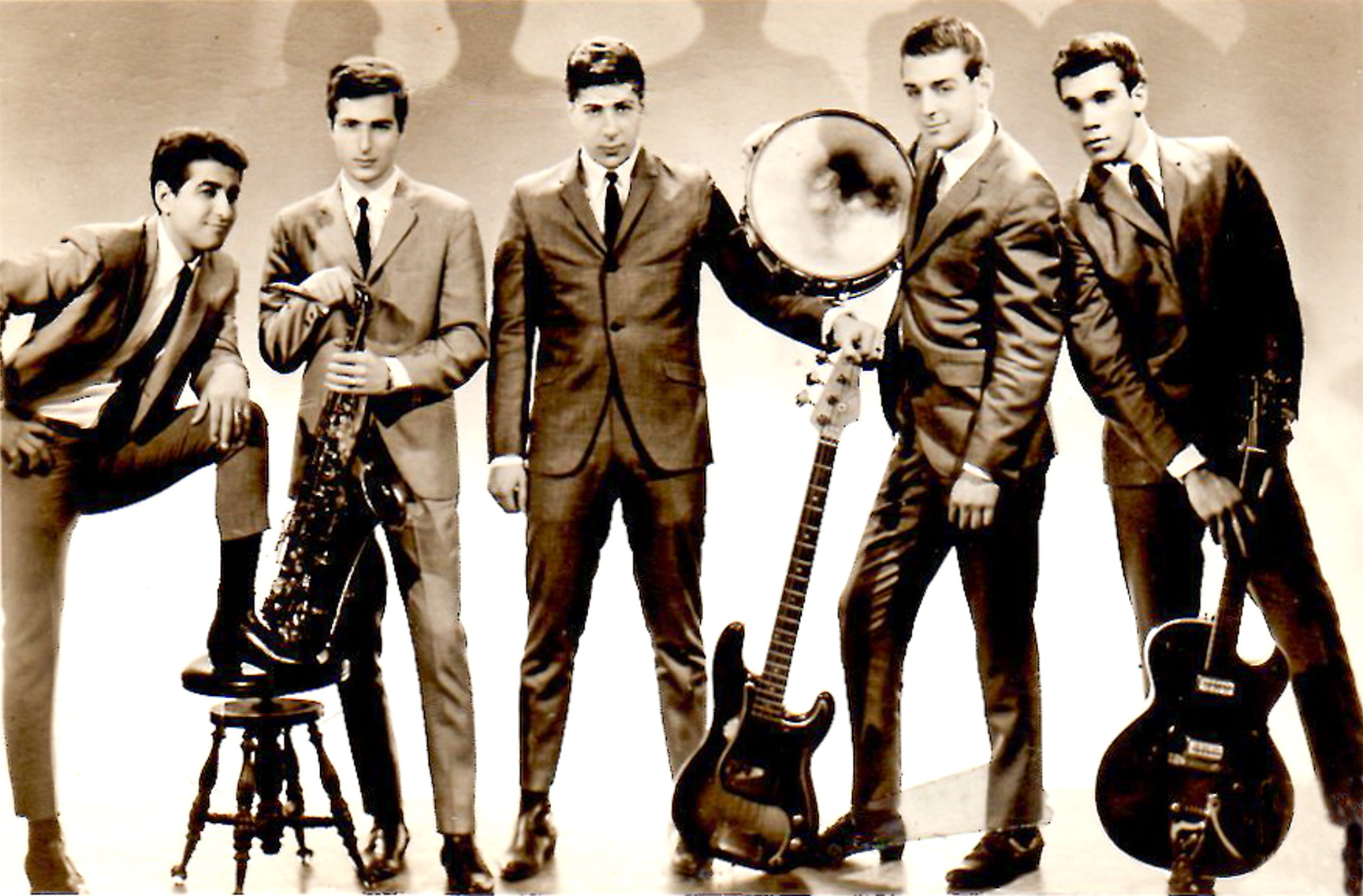
The Chancellors (left to right): Bijan Yakuboff, Don Grassini, Ronnie Salvani, Nick DiMinno, George Marino

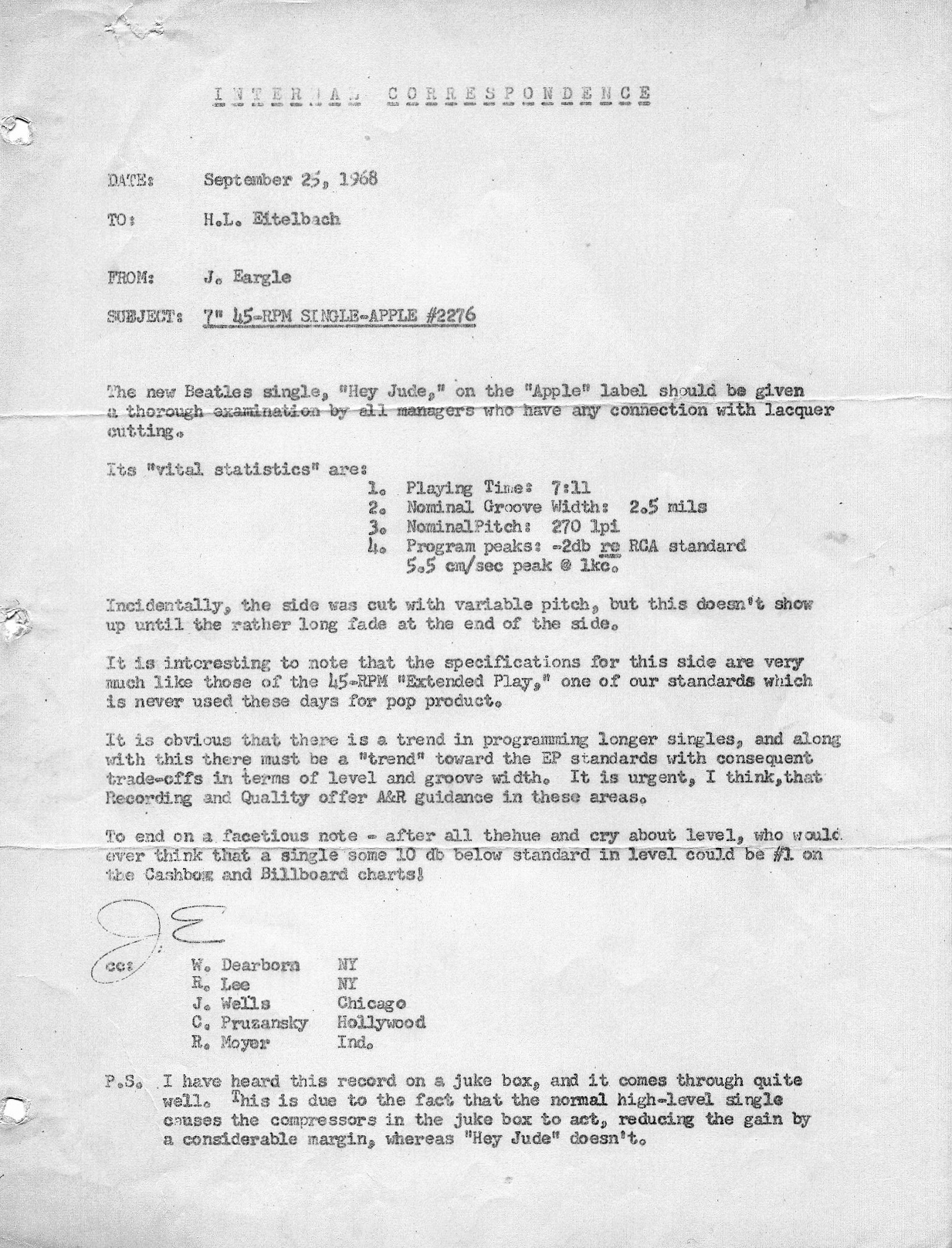
Capitol Studios letter regarding the mastering of the 7-inch 45 RPM single of "Hey Jude"

== Professional career ==
During his time at Capitol, Marino mastered such classics as The Beatles' 7-inch single of "Hey Jude" and John Lennon & Plastic Ono Band's Live Peace in Toronto 1969. When Capitol Records closed its New York studio in 1971, Marino joined the fledgling Record Plant, eventually becoming a partner in the mastering business of the Record Plant called the Master Cutting Room, which was on West 44th Street in Manhattan. There he became established with projects such as Don McLean's American Pie, Alice Cooper's Billion Dollar Babies, Gregg Allman's Laid Back, and Stevie Wonder's Talking Book and Innervisions.

Lee Hulko, one of the owners of Sterling Sound, saw Marino's success and asked him to come work at Sterling, however Marino did not say yes immediately. After Chris Stone, the owner of the Record Plant went to Los Angeles, Marino had more management duties and he felt it distracted him from his mastering work. Eventually, Marino took Hulko up on his offer and he headed to Sterling Sound in 1973 to work in a room that Hulko had built for him.

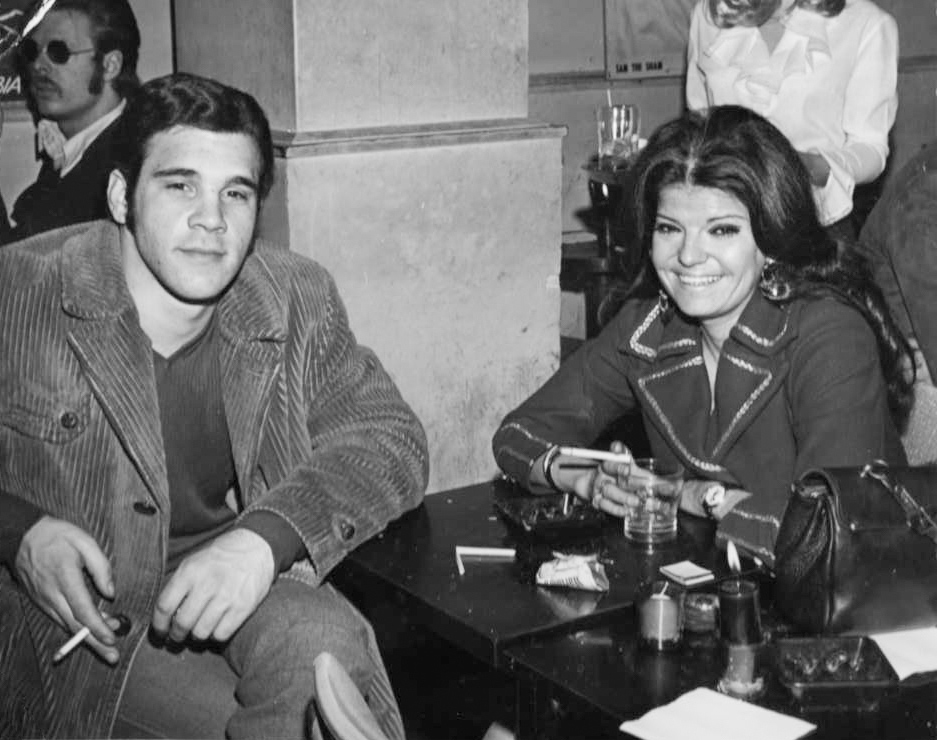
George and Rose Marino

=== Sterling Sound (1973-2012) ===
From 1973, until his death in 2012, Marino worked at Sterling Sound. In 1998, Ted Jensen, Greg Calbi and Tom Coyne, along with Murat Aktar (Absolute Audio co-founder) and UK based Metropolis, purchased Sterling from previous owner, Lee Hulko. Marino was the most senior mastering engineer. Sterling Sound then was located in New York City, occupying the top floor of the Chelsea Market in the Meatpacking District. Marino's studio was one of the three surround sound studios at Sterling and it was designed by Fran Manzella, FM Design.

Marino's room became one of the few mastering suites in the industry, if not the only one, that was capable of doing both surround sound and vinyl mastering. Marino, along with Chris Muth and Sterling techs Barry Wolifson and Phil Sztenderowicz, turned Marino's mastering console into an 8 channel A/B preview console. This design made possible presetting console parameters from song to song, which is needed for the continuous process of cutting a side of a vinyl album. This type of design was common in mastering houses during vinyl's heyday, but what made this one different was the ability to also process 6 discrete channels for surround sound.

Over the course of Marino's nearly 40 years with Sterling, he mastered and/or remastered albums by Kurban, AC/DC, Cat Stevens, Led Zeppelin, Aerosmith, Guns N' Roses, Metallica, DIO, Cheap Trick, Arcade Fire, Whitney Houston, Coldplay; Cyndi Lauper; Journey; Kiss; Mötley Crüe; The Cars; Bon Jovi; Arctic Monkeys; Dan Fogelberg; Iron Maiden; Fountains of Wayne; Incubus; Joe Bonamassa; Jimi Hendrix; Joe Satriani; Michael Bublé; Weezer; Leonard Cohen, My Morning Jacket, The Tragically Hip, 3 Doors Down, Alice Cooper, Billy Squier, Cinderella, M-Squad, Sarah Brightman, The Psychedelic Furs, Tommy James and the Shondells, Bob Dylan, John Mellencamp, Red Hot Chili Peppers, Ringo Starr, Santana, Josh Groban, Southside Johnny, Willie Nile, Elvis Presley, Fall Out Boy, Ozzy Osbourne, Blondie, Hanson, Jimmy Page and hundreds of others.

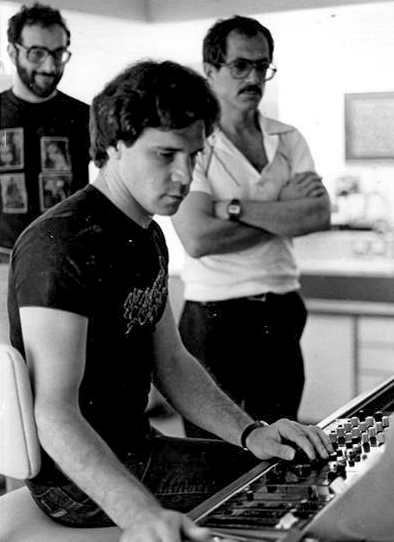
Early years at Sterling Sound

Marino mastered many of John Lennon's and Yoko Ono's albums, one of them being Double Fantasy with producer Jack Douglas. Double Fantasy had been out a few weeks when Douglas and Lennon decided to have a song they had just finished, Yoko Ono's "Walking on Thin Ice", mastered with Marino at Sterling Sound for a single release. On the evening of December 8, 1980, after finishing up a session at the Record Plant, Douglas said to Lennon "See you in the morning" as they planned to have breakfast together at 9am before heading to Sterling, but John Lennon was gunned down 20 minutes later on his way back to the Dakota.

Marino received his first and only Grammy for Arcade Fire's The Suburbs in 2011, the year before he died. Since 2012, mastering engineers became eligible to win Grammys for Record of the Year and Best Engineered Album, Non-Classical; they had been eligible for Album of the Year since 2002. Under these rules, he would have won an additional seven Grammys from 1969 to 2012: three for Innervisions, Double Fantasy and The Bodyguard (Album of the Year winners), two for "I Will Always Love You" and "Clocks" (Record of the Year winners), and two more for Innervisions and Chicago 17 (Best Engineered Album, Non-Classical winners).

== Death ==
Marino died on June 4, 2012, after a year of having lung cancer. He was 65.

== Awards and recognition ==
=== Grammy Awards ===
- In 2002, Marino earned his first Grammy nomination for Bob Dylan's Love and Theft
- In 2011, Marino won a Grammy Award for Album of the Year for Arcade Fire's The Suburbs

=== TEC Awards ===
Marino was nominated for the Mix Foundation's TEC Award for Outstanding Creative Achievement in 1985, 1991, 1992, and 1993.

== Selected works ==
Marino mastered and remastered thousands of albums in over 40 years as a mastering engineer.
