= Kilou =

Kilou may refer to:

- Kilou, Bazèga, Burkina Faso
- Kilou, Bam, Burkina Faso
