= Tampèlga =

Tampèlga may refer to:

- Tampèlga, Tikare, Burkina Faso
- Tampèlga, Zimtenga, Burkina Faso
