= Zamsé =

Zamsé may refer to:

- Zamsé, Bam, Burkina Faso
- Zamsé, Ganzourgou, Burkina Faso
