= Sancé, Burkina Faso =

Sancé, Burkina Faso may refer to two towns:

- Sancé, Bam
- Sancé, Bazèga
