= Rock'n Coke =

Music festival in Turkey

- Rock'n Coke 2003 poster
- Genre: Rock music
- Dates: end August/early September
- Locations: Hezarfen Airfield in Istanbul, Turkey
- Years active: 2003 - 2013
- Founders: Coca-Cola

Rock'n Coke was the biggest open Turkish rock festival sponsored by Coca-Cola. It was traditionally held at the Hezarfen Airfield in Istanbul, Turkey. Famous headliners like Limp Bizkit, Motörhead, Travis, Moby, Nine Inch Nails, Muse, Franz Ferdinand, Placebo, The Cure, Korn, Arctic Monkeys, Iggy Pop, Gogol Bordello, The Prodigy, Linkin Park, Within Temptation, The Rasmus, Juliette Lewis performed at the festival over the years.

== Festival ==
Rock'n Coke is a member of the European Festivals Association. The festival was organized by the Turkish concert organizer Pozitif. At the end of every summer, the Hezarfen Airfield was used as a venue for a two-day chain of concerts, with both national and international performers featured. Although mainly rock-oriented, Rock'n Coke also hosts other music genres. While the main stage was generally reserved for rock and its subgenres, the DJ Arena (now called Burn Stage, following the sponsorship) was reserved for styles such as house music.

In 2005, the festival grounds were large enough to support two stages, a mini-amusement park, two large food areas, a shopping area, several sponsor attractions, 400 outhouses and a large camp site for people with two-day tickets. In 2008 & 2010, no festival was held due to decision of making it every two years. 2011's festival was held on 16–17 July at the airfield again. The 2013 festival was held later than of 2011 on 6–8 September again at the Hezarfen Airfield.

Kanal D and Dream TV were the major media sponsors of the organization.

== Rock'n Coke 2013 ==
Main Stage'

Saturday 7 September 2013

- Büyük Ev Ablukada
- maNga
- Editors
- Duman
- Hurts
- Arctic Monkeys

Sunday 8 September 2013

- The Prodigy
- Rebel Moves
- Aylin Aslım
- Primal Scream
- Within Temptation
- Teoman
- Jamiroquai

Alternative Stage

Saturday 7 September 2013

- The Ringo Jets
- Ayyuka
- Triggerfinger
- Palma Violets
- Maxïmo Park
- Can Bonomo
- La Roux

Sunday 8 September 2013

- Ellie Goulding
- Skindred
- Replikas
- Oi Va Voi
- Yasemin Mori
- Melis Danişmend
- Selah Sue

"Discovery" Stage

Saturday 7 September 2013

- Çağrı Sertel Trio
- Figli Di Madre Ignota
- Yemen Blues
- Yora
- Parno Graszt
- Deladap
- Kirika
- Boban Markovich Band

Sunday 8 September 2013

- Deniz Güngör Aquadrum
- Serdar Barçın Band
- Umut Adan
- Radio Moscow
- Farfara
- Che Sudoka
- Kadebostany
- Mabel Matiz
- Shantel's Bucovina Club Band

== Past performances ==
=== Rock'n Coke 2011 ===
Main Stage

Saturday 16 July 2011

- Limp Bizkit
- Motörhead
- 2 Many DJs
- The Kooks
- Kurban

Sunday 17 July 2011

- Travis
- Moby
- Paolo Nutini
- Skunk Anansie
- Athena
- Friendly Fires

Alternative Stage

- Curry&Coco
- Ilhan Ersahin's Istanbul Sessions
- Acid Washed
- Thievery Corporation
- Beach House
- Gaslamp Killer
- Tunng
- FM Belfast
- Melis Danişmend

Sonar Stage

- Dum Dum Girls
- Electrelane
- Esben and the Witch
- Mogwai
- The Black Lips
- The Qemists
- Chapel Club

=== Rock'n Coke 2009 ===
Rockn Coke 2009 was held 17,18 and 19 July 2009 at its new venue Istanbul Park.

==== Main stage ====
First Day 18.

- The Prodigy
- Nine Inch Nails
- Duman
- Jane's Addiction
- Juliette Lewis
- Emre Aydın
- Upgrade

Second Day 19.

- Linkin Park
- Kaiser Chiefs
- Razorlight
- Hayko Cepkin
- Manga vs. Cartel
- Cold War Kids
- D2
- Türbülans

==== Alternate Stages ====
First Day 18.

- Gece
- WUFI
- Gren
- Çilekeş
- The Twelves
- FOMA
- Sakin
- Badem

Second Day 19.

- Sattas
- ProudPilot
- Fuat
- We have Band
- Post Dial
- Mabbas & Style-ist
- Santigold
- Çilekeş

=== Rock'n Coke 2007 ===
Main Stage

- Franz Ferdinand
- The Smashing Pumpkins
- Manic Street Preachers
- Chris Cornell
- Teoman
- Rashit
- Pentagram
- Within Temptation
- Özlem Tekin
- Badly Drawn Boy
- Hayko Cepkin
- Gripin
- Aslı
- 110

Burn Stage

- Erol Alkan
- DJ Mehdi
- Uffie & Feadz
- Filthy Dukes
- Buraka Som Sistema
- Agentorange
- Bedük
- Style-ist
- Mabbas
- Kreş
- Ayben
- Fairuz Derinbulut
- Ayyuka
- Rumblefish
- Neon
- Digital Playground
- Üçnoktabir
- Engin Eraydın

=== Rock'n Coke 2006 ===
Main Stage

- Muse
- Placebo
- Kasabian
- Gogol Bordello
- Şebnem Ferah
- Mercury Rev
- Hayko Cepkin
- The Sisters of Mercy
- Duman
- Editors
- Reamonn
- Vega
- Ogün Sanlısoy
- Yüksek Sadakat

Burn Stage

- Danny Howells
- Demi
- Tangun
- The Glimmers
- Mabba & Syle-İST
- Portecho
- West End Girls
- Dandadadan
- Aydilge
- Tiga
- Hyper
- Headman
- Ali & Ozan
- The Rogers Sisters
- Direc-t

=== Rock'n Coke 2005 ===
Main Stage

- The Cure
- Korn
- The Offspring
- Apocalyptica
- Skin
- Şebnem Ferah
- The Tears
- Hot Hot Heat
- Ceza
- Nação Zumbi
- Pamela Spence
- Replikas
- MaNga
- Rashit & Hanin Elias

Burn Stage

- Timo Maas
- Tamburada
- Karargah
- Murat Beşer
- Angie Reed
- Style-ist
- Evil Nine
- Eden & Batu
- Jonny Rock
- Tom Middleton
- Emre & Tutan
- Ricardo Villalobos
- Barış K
- The Rootsman
- 110
- Sid Le Rock Reynold
- Mabbas
- The Bays
- Murat Uncuoğlu & Shovell
- Alex Smoke
- Ellen Allien
- Mylo

=== Rock'n Coke 2004 ===
Main Stage

- Iggy & The Stooges
- The Rasmus
- 50 Cent
- MFÖ
- Ash
- Sly & Robbie & Taxi gang
- Fun Lovin' Criminals
- The Orb
- dEUS
- Spiritualized
- Athena
- Wax Poetic
- Kurban
- Özlem Tekin
- 3 Colours Red
- Erkin Koray
- Kargo
- Rebel Moves

DJ Arena

- Carl Craig
- Richard Fearless
- The Jugula Sessions hosted by Neneh Cherry (DJ Set) & The Family
- Zion Train (Live)
- DJs Are Not Rockstars Princess Superstar & Alexander Technique on 4 Decks
- Kris Verex
- Orient Expressions (Live)
- P.O.P (Live)
- Barış K
- DJ Krush (Live)
- Etienne de Crécy
- Jo Jo De Freq
- Psychonauts
- Twilight Circus Dub Sound System
- Asher Selector
- Hakan Kurşun (Live)
- Agent Orange
- İsmet

=== Rock'n Coke 2003 ===
Main Stage

- Pet Shop Boys
- The Cardigans
- Suede
- Simple Minds
- Echo & the Bunnymen
- Hooverphonic
- MFÖ
- Athena
- Dreadzone
- Guano Apes
- Sugababes
- Duman
- Mercan Dede feat. Athena
- Nil Karaibrahimgil
- Rashit
- Dirty Vegas
- Dead Kennedys
- The Delgados

DJ Arena

- Phil Hartnoll
- DJ Paul Daley
- Lisa Pin-Up
- Arkın Allen (Mercan Dede)
- Fuchs
- Daddy G
- Felix Da Housecat
- Marshall Jefferson
- Slam
- Mabbas
- DJ Yakuza
- Style-ist

== See also ==
- RockIstanbul
