= Kırmızı =

Kırmızı (Red) is a Turkish Anatolian heavy metal band founded in Istanbul in 2005 by Idil Çağatay and Aslı Polat. They have been seen to "cultivate an image of female power and strength". On 5 October 2011 they performed on the CNN International show Inside the Middle East.

== Composition ==
In March 2010 the line-up was reported as İdil Çağatay on vocals, Fulya Akgün on guitar, Aslı Polat on drums, and Başak Gün on bass.

== Music ==
Their first single, named “Kırmızı” came out in 2010. After they published the music videos of “Veda Etme” and “Kırmızı”, they become more popular.

In 2011 they released Turkey’s first all female band album, Isyan (Rebellion). The first music video of the album was “Çekilin Başımdan”, which was a duet with Hayko Cepkin. The second music video of the album was “Geri”.

In 2012 they made an underwater performance music video for their song “Elveda”, for which İdil Çağatay took scuba diving lessons.

The band was invited to perform at one of Europe's major world music festivals, Festival Mundial in the Netherlands.

== Activism ==
Kırmızı supported the “100.000 SMS Against Violence” campaign of “Fight against Domestic Violence” platform by dedicating a song named “Araf” to all violated women in Turkey.
