= Ansouri =

Village in Tikare Department, Burkina Faso

- Location in Burkina Faso
- Coordinates: 13°18′43″N 1°45′34″W
- Country: Burkina Faso
- Region: Centre-Nord Region
- Province: Bam Province
- Department: Tikare Department

Population (2019)
  - Total: 375
- Time zone: UTC+0 (GMT 0)

Ansouri is a town in the Tikare Department of Bam Province in northern Burkina Faso.

Population
Year	Pop.	±%
1985	282	—
2006	377	+33.7%
2019	375	−0.5%
