= Burak Gürpınar =

Turkish drummer (born 1975)

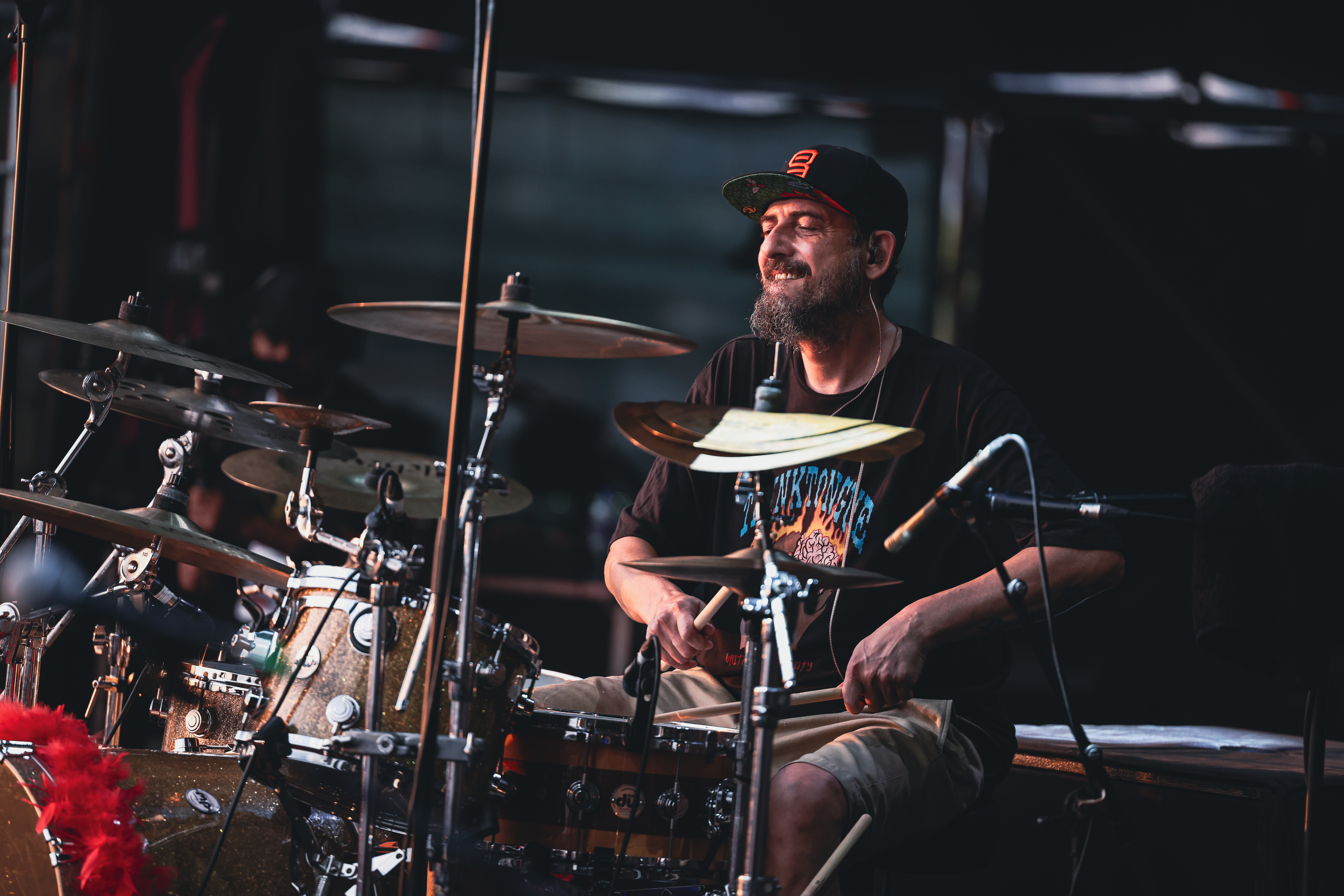

Burak Gürpınar (born March 23, 1975) is a Turkish drummer primarily known for his work with the influential Turkish rock band Kurban.

Gürpınar was born on March 23, 1975, in Istanbul.

Soon after Kurban disbanded in June, 2005, Gürpınar joined Athena, a Turkish ska-punk rock band which he collaborated with as an additional artist in previous years. By 2007, his first band, Kurban, decided to reunite, and he goes on with them.

Burak Gürpınar is primarily known for his virtuosity on drums, combined with his energetic and humorous character both on and off stage. Additionally, Gürpınar is one of the best drummers in Europe. He also worked with Teoman in "En Güzel Hikayem" and Şebnem Ferah in "Artık Kısa Cümleler Kuruyorum", among many other prominent professional musicians in Turkey.

Burak Gürpinar also worked as a graphic designer and designed the album art work for most of Kurban's albums.
