= Vato-Foulbé =

Village in Tikare Department, Burkina Faso

- Country: Burkina Faso
- Region: Centre-Nord Region
- Province: Bam Province
- Department: Tikare Department

Population (2019)
  - Total: 206
- Time zone: UTC+0 (GMT 0)

Vato-Foulbé is a village in the Tikare Department of Bam Province in northern Burkina Faso.

Population
Year	Pop.	±%
1985	88	—
2006	196	+122.7%
2019	206	+5.1%
