= Fatih Ahıskalı =

Turkish musician

- Born: 1976 (age 48–49); Antalya, Turkey
- Origin: Turkish Meskhetian
- Genres: Turkish folk, world music
- Occupation: Musician
- Instrument: Oud
- Years active: 1997–present
- Member of: Yeni Türkü
- Formerly of: Asia Minör; Kardeş Türküler

Fatih Ahıskalı (born 1976 in Antalya, Turkey) is a member of the prominent Turkish band Yeni Türkü "New Türkü". He plays the oud.

== Life ==
Ahıskalı was born in Antalya, Turkey, into a family of Turkish Meskhetian origin. After finishing high school in Antalya, he moved to Istanbul where he studied at the Istanbul Technical University Turkish Music State Conservatory. In 1997 he joined the Yeni Türkü group. Later, in his professional music career, he became a member of groups such as "Asia Minör" and Kardeş Türküler.

He also accompanied singers such as Ajda Pekkan, Burcu Güneş, Yaşar, Deniz Seki, Funda Arar, Sezen Aksu, Tarkan, and Kenan Doğulu on their albums and on stage.

He was chosen as the best oud player in the Lions Club music competition in 1999.

In 2010 he released an instrumental (non-verbal) album called Akide.

== Personal life ==
Ahıskalı has been married twice. He has one son from his first marriage. His son, Kaan, is the boy playing the djembe in Ahıskalı's video clip called "Fayton".
