= Horé =

Village in Tikare Department, Burkina Faso

- Location in Burkina Faso
- Coordinates: 13°17′N 1°41′W
- Country: Burkina Faso
- Region: Centre-Nord Region
- Province: Bam Province
- Department: Tikare Department

Population (2019)
  - Total: 3,432
- Time zone: UTC+0 (GMT 0)

Horé is a town in the Tikare Department of Bam Province in northern Burkina Faso.

Population
Year	Pop.	±%
1985	1,692	—
2006	2,361	+39.5%
2019	3,432	+45.4%
