= Dargouma =

Village in Tikare Department, Burkina Faso

- Location in Burkina Faso
- Coordinates: 13°24′N 1°50′W
- Country: Burkina Faso
- Region: Centre-Nord Region
- Province: Bam Province
- Department: Tikare Department

Population (2019)
  - Total: 1,471
- Time zone: UTC+0 (GMT 0)

Dargouma is a village in the Tikare Department of Bam Province in northern Burkina Faso.

Population
Year	Pop.	±%
1985	644	—
2006	941	+46.1%
2019	1,471	+56.3%
