= Oui, Burkina Faso =

Village in Tikare Department, Burkina Faso

Oui
- Location in Burkina Faso
- Coordinates: 13°25′N 1°47′W
- Country: Burkina Faso
- Region: Centre-Nord Region
- Province: Bam Province
- Department: Tikare Department

Population (2019)
  - Total: 1,373
- Time zone: UTC+0 (GMT 0)

'Oui is a village in the Tikare Department of Bam Province in northern Burkina Faso.

Population
Year	Pop.	±%
1985	690	—
2006	968	+40.3%
2019	1,373	+41.8%
