= Songodin =

Village in Tikare Department, Burkina Faso

Songodin Sogodin
- Location in Burkina Faso
- Coordinates: 13°22′N 1°49′W
- Country: Burkina Faso
- Region: Centre-Nord Region
- Province: Bam Province
- Department: Tikare Department

Population (2019)
  - Total: 338
- Time zone: UTC+0 (GMT 0)

Songodin is a village in the Tikare Department of Bam Province in northern Burkina Faso.

Population
Year	Pop.	±%
1985	156	—
2006	190	+21.8%
2019	338	+77.9%
