= Dafire =

Village in Tikare Department, Burkina Faso

- Location in Burkina Faso
- Coordinates: 13°23′N 1°46′W
- Country: Burkina Faso
- Region: Centre-Nord Region
- Province: Bam Province
- Department: Tikare Department

Population (2019)
  - Total: 1,777
- Time zone: UTC+0 (GMT 0)

Dafire is also a town in the Tikare Department of Bam Province in northern Burkina Faso.

Population
Year	Pop.	±%
1985	744	—
2006	1,331	+78.9%
2019	1,777	+33.5%
