= Kamtenga =

Village in Tikare Department, Burkina Faso

Kamtenga Kamtinga
- Location in Burkina Faso
- Coordinates: 13°21′N 1°50′W
- Country: Burkina Faso
- Region: Centre-Nord Region
- Province: Bam Province
- Department: Tikare Department

Population (2019)
  - Total: 1,386
- Time zone: UTC+0 (GMT 0)

Kamtenga is a village in the Tikare Department of Bam Province in northern Burkina Faso.

Population
Year	Pop.	±%
1985	602	—
2006	878	+45.8%
2019	1,386	+57.9%
