= Tekirdağ Çorlu Atatürk Airport =

Turkish airport

Tekirdağ Çorlu Atatürk Airport Tekirdağ Çorlu Atatürk Havalimanı
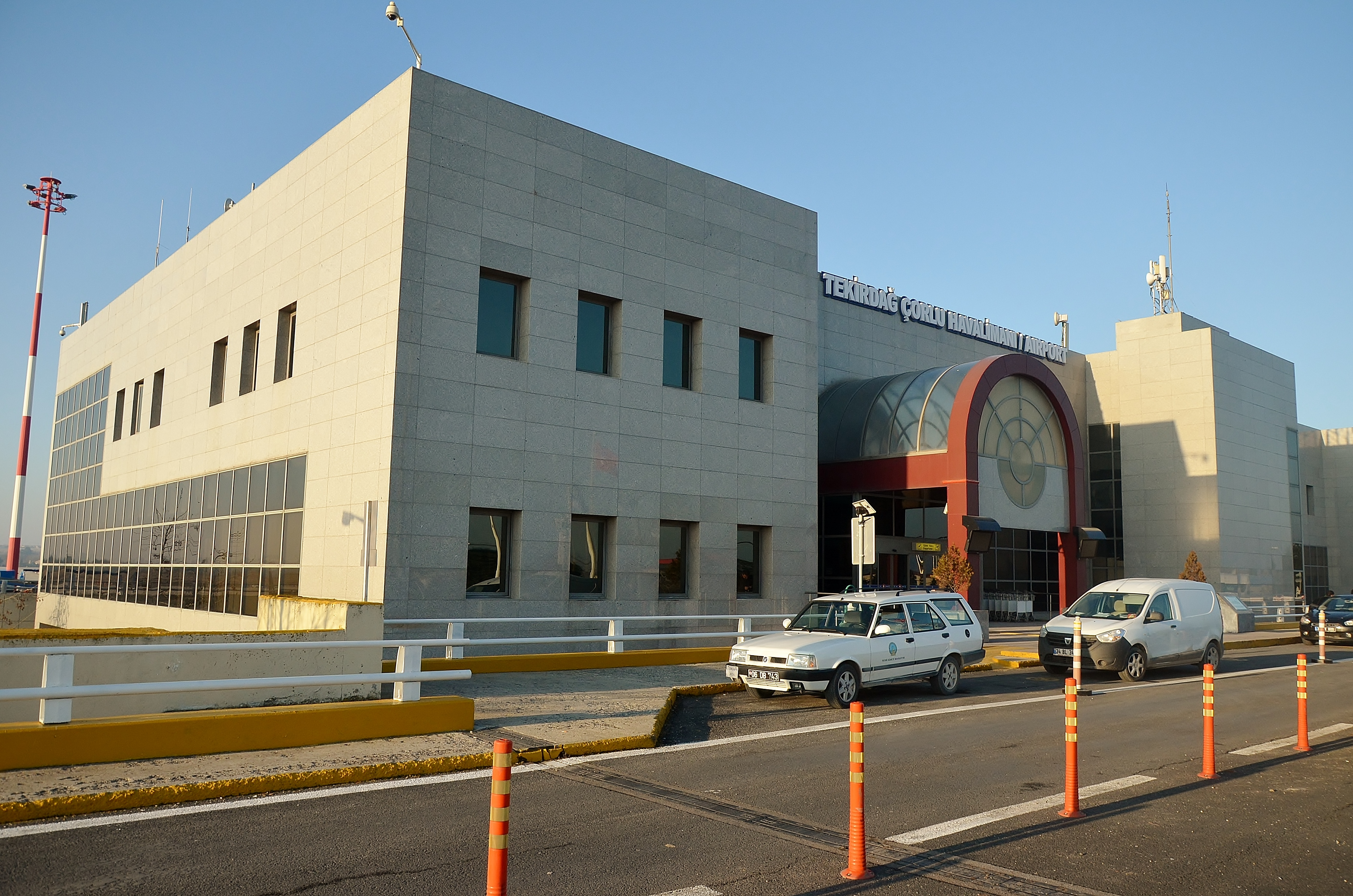
- IATA: TEQ; ICAO: LTBU

Summary
- Airport type: Public/civil, military
- Operator: General Directorate of State Airports Authority
- Serves: Tekirdağ, Turkey
- Location: Çorlu, Tekirdağ, Turkey
- Opened: 8 August 1998; 28 years ago
- Elevation AMSL: 574 ft (175 m)
- Coordinates: 41°8′18″N 27°55′9″E
- Website: DHMI Çorlu

Map
- Location of airport in Turkey's Marmara Region TEQ (Turkey) TEQ (Europe)

Runways
Direction	Length		Surface
Direction	ft	m	Surface
05/23	9,843	3,000	Paved

Statistics (2025)
- Annual passenger capacity: 1,000,000
- Passengers: 29,774
- Passenger change 2024–25: ▼1%
- Aircraft movements: 36,907
- Movements change 2024–25: ▲41%

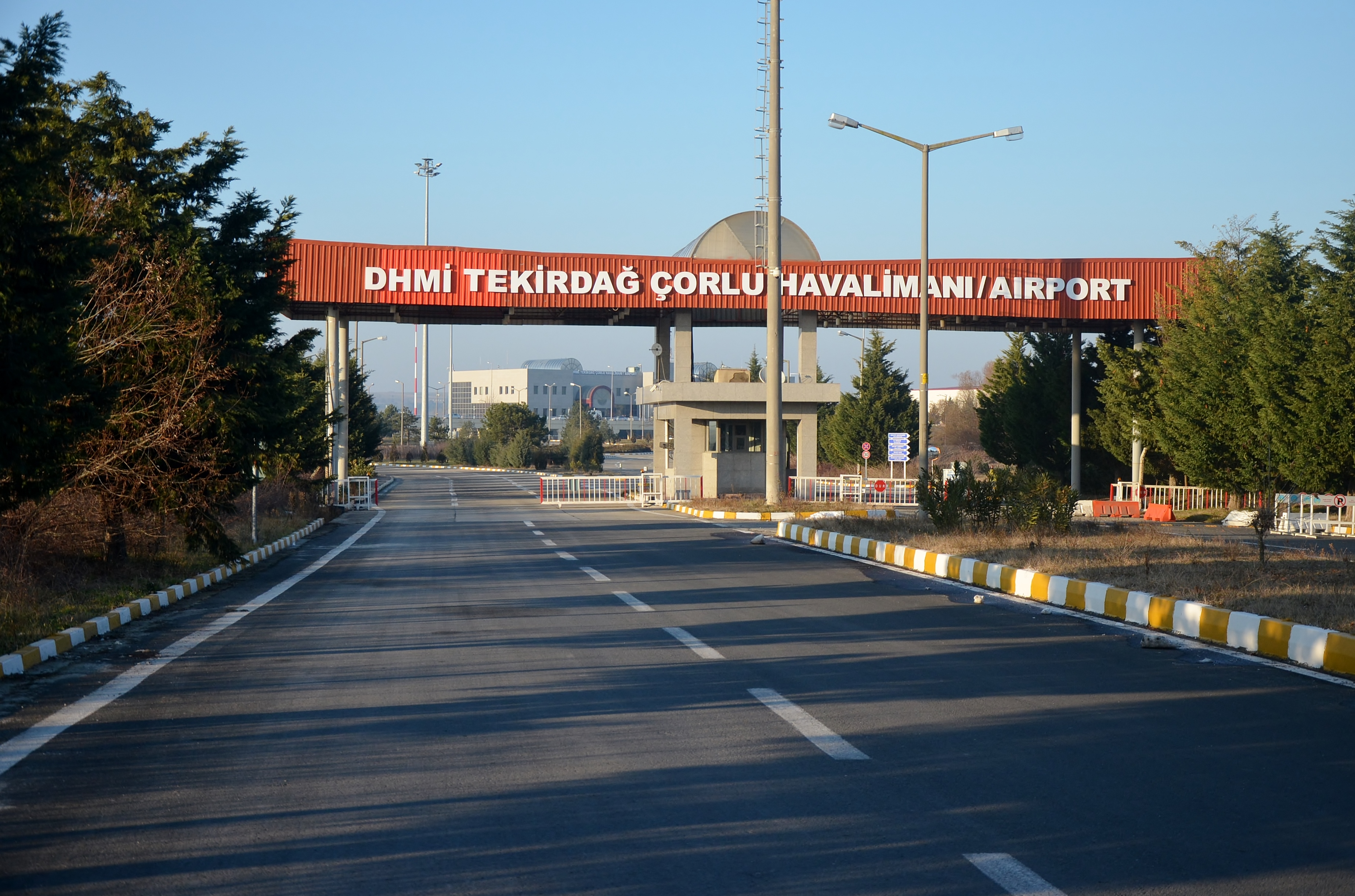
Gates of the airport

Tekirdağ Çorlu Atatürk Airport (IATA: TEQ, ICAO: LTBU) (Turkish: Tekirdağ Çorlu Atatürk Havalimanı) is a military and public airport in Çorlu, a city in Tekirdağ Province, Turkey. Opened to public/civil air traffic in 1998, the airport is 10.5 km (6.5 mi) east of Çorlu.

== Airlines and destinations ==
The following airlines operate regular scheduled and charter flights at Tekirdağ Çorlu Airport:

Airlines	Destinations
Pegasus Airlines	Ankara

== Traffic statistics ==
Tekirdağ–Çorlu Atatürk Airport passenger traffic statistics
Year (months)	Domestic	% change	International	% change	Total	% change
2025	29,306	▼1%	468	▼39%	29,774	▼1%
2024	29,440	▼8%	763	▼53%	30,203	▼10%
2023	32,068	▲14%	1,640	▼90%	33,708	▼24%
2022	28,250	▲340%	15,955	▲1091%	44,205	▲469%
2021	6,426	▼71%	1,340	▲317%	7,776	▼66%
2020	22,460	▼68%	321	▼82%	22,781	▼69%
2019	71,137	▼31%	1,816	▼47%	72,953	▼31%
2018	102,783	▼1%	3,424	▲185%	106,207	▲1%
2017	103,678	▲10%	1,201	▼63%	104,879	▲7%
2016	94,626	▼3%	3,243	▼94%	97.869	▼35%
2015	97,710	▼20%	52,630	▲9592%	150,340	▲23%
2014	122,025	▲63%	543	▼82%	122,568	▲57%
2013	74,844	▲185%	3,021	▲43057%	77,865	▲197%
2012	26,250	▼39%	7	▼98%	26,257	▼39%
2011	42,839	▼33%	281	▼97%	43,120	▼42%
2010	64,176	▲110%	10,228	▲1%	74,404	▲82%
2009	30,629	-	10,149	▲48%	40,778	▲493%
2008	-	-	6,882	▼77%	6,882	▼77%
2007	-	Steady	29,768	Steady	29,768	Steady

== See also ==
- Hezarfen Airfield
