= Hezarfen Airfield =

Hezarfen Airfield Hezarfen Havaalanı
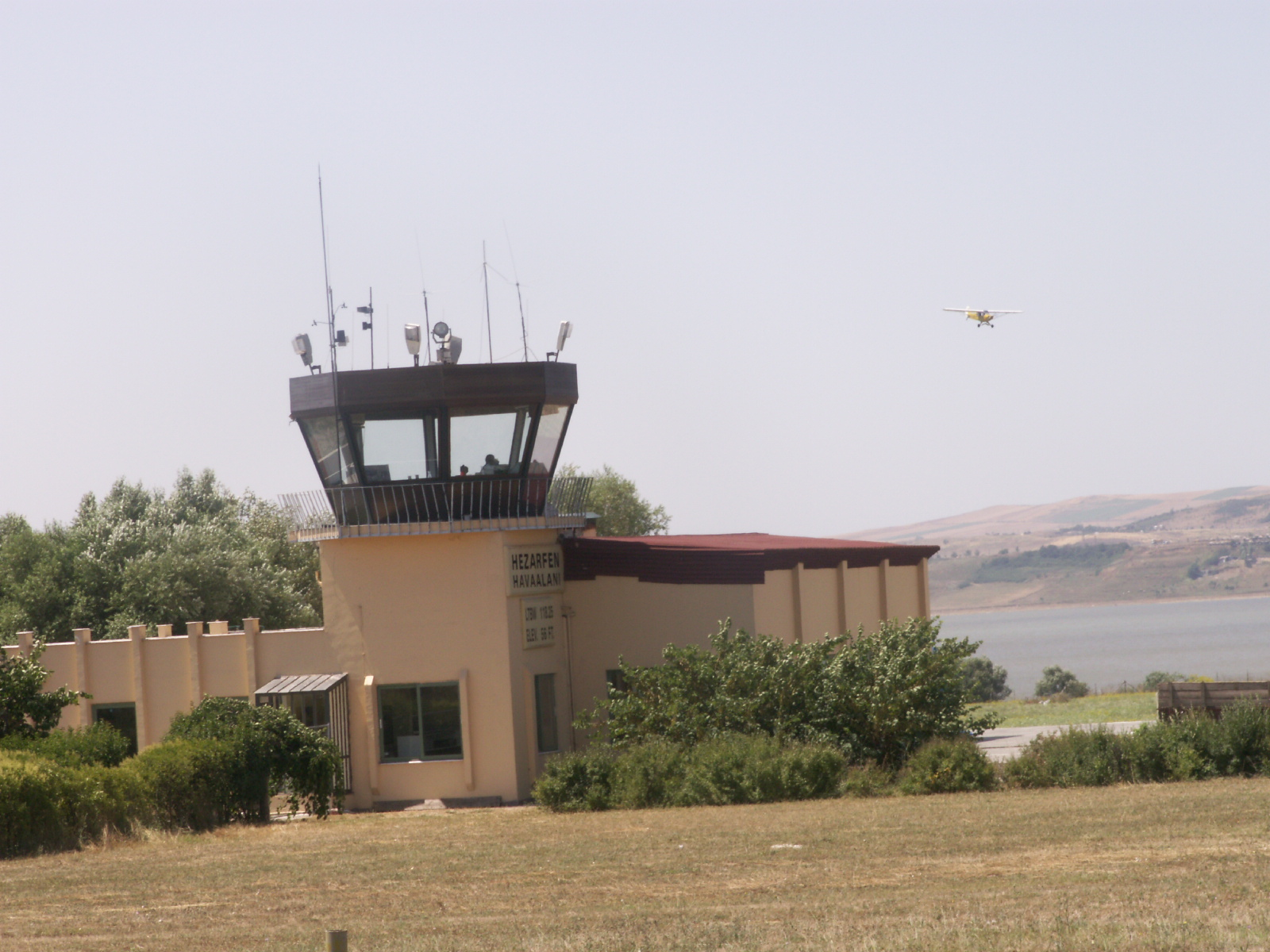
- IATA: none; ICAO: LTBW

Summary
- Airport type: Public property
- Owner: Kar Group of Companies
- Operator: İstanbul Hezarfen Havaalanı
- Serves: Istanbul, Turkey
- Location: Çatalca, Istanbul, Turkey
- Opened: 24 October 1992; 33 years ago
- Elevation AMSL: 56 ft / 17 m
- Coordinates: 41°06′16.2″N 28°33′00″E
- Website: http://www.hezarfen.com.tr/

Map
- Location of airport in Turkey LTBW (Europe)

Runways
| Direction | Length | | Surface |
| Direction | ft | m | Surface |
|---|---|---|---|
| 05/23 | 2,230 | 681 | Asphalt |

Hezarfen Airfield (Turkish: Hezarfen Havaalanı) (ICAO: LTBW) is a privately owned airport for general aviation in the Çatalca district of Istanbul, Turkey. It is one of a total of five airports in Istanbul along with Istanbul Airport (LTFM), Istanbul Sabiha Gökçen International Airport (LTFJ), Atatürk Airport (LTBA), and Samandıra Army Air Base (LTBX). Hezarfen Airfield is named after Hezârfen Ahmet Çelebi, a legendary Ottoman aviator, who flew across the Bosporus in the 17th century, as told by a contemporary traveler Evliya Çelebi.

The 500 acres (200 ha) airfield is on a peninsula surrounded by Lake Büyükçekmece to the south and by the motorway O-3 / E80 to the north. It is 50 km (31 mi) west of Istanbul. Since 1992, it has served as the first internationally acknowledged private airport in Turkey.

Its asphalt runway is 681 m (2,234 ft) long and 28 m (92 ft) wide. There are four taxiways parallel to the runway, a 2,400 m^{2} (26,000 sq ft) concrete ramp, and another 3,000 m^{2} (32,000 sq ft) paved one. It also has a motocross circuit, a 120 m (390 ft) long model airplane field, and a heliport.

== Hezarfen Hobbyland ==
The airfield, called also "Hezarfen Hobbyland", offers facilities for model aircraft flying, model car racing, motocross racing, drag racing (cars and motorcycles), car and driver testing and flight simulation.

In addition to "Istanbul Aviation Festival" held each year in June, the Hezarfen Airfield hosts also the open air music festival Rock'n Coke, held since 2003 annually in September for two days attracting around 30,000 music fans.

The airfield is home to an aviation school training air traffic controllers, fixed-wing aircraft and helicopter pilots. Turkey's only civil aerobatics school and team is also based here. Another school at the site is for training motorcycle racing.

Other social facilities offered by the Hezarfen Hobbyland are a restaurant and premises for business conventions, fairs and exhibitions. Its public recreational area include also a playground for children, a skateboarding ground, and a 2,500 m (8,200 ft) course around the airfield for jogging and biking, in addition to a picnic and barbecue ground.

== Gallery ==
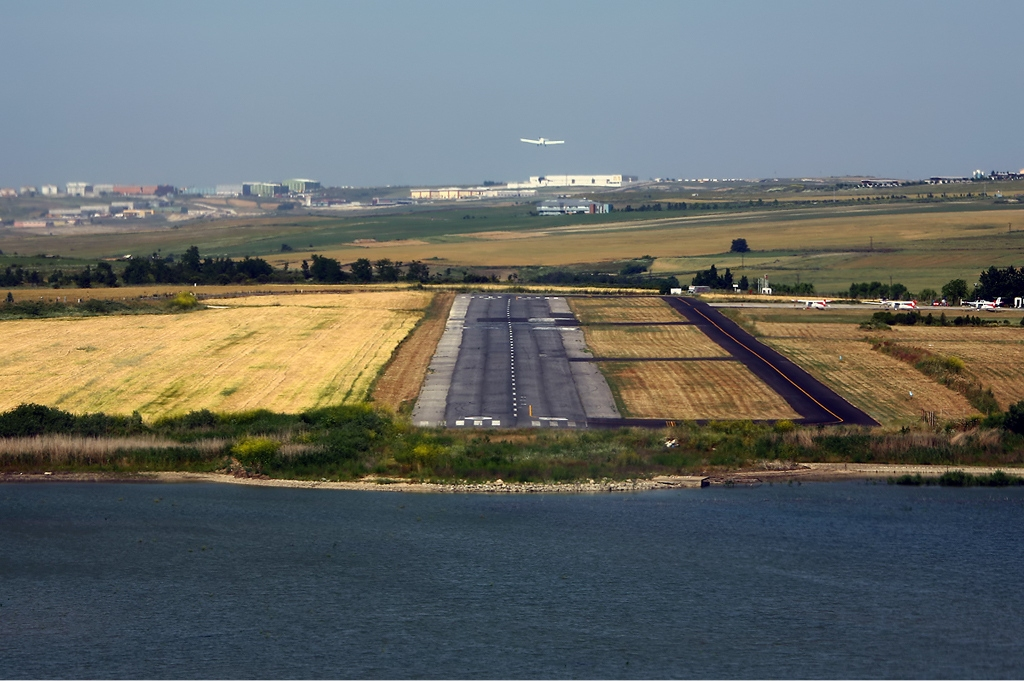

== See also ==
- Tekirdağ Çorlu Airport
- Istanbul Airport
- Istanbul Atatürk International Airport
- Istanbul Sabiha Gökçen International Airport
- Istanbul Samandıra Air Base
