= Vato-Mossi =

Village in Tikare Department, Burkina Faso

Vato-Mossi Vato
- Location in Burkina Faso
- Coordinates: 13°27′N 1°50′W
- Country: Burkina Faso
- Region: Centre-Nord Region
- Province: Bam Province
- Department: Tikare Department

Population (2019)
  - Total: 2,824
- Time zone: UTC+0 (GMT 0)

Vato-Mossi is a town in the Tikare Department of Bam Province in northern Burkina Faso.

Population
Year	Pop.	±%
1985	1,218	—
2006	1,906	+56.5%
2019	2,824	+48.2%
