= Samandıra Army Air Base =

Military airport in Turkey

Samandıra Army Air Base Samandıra Kara Hava Üssü
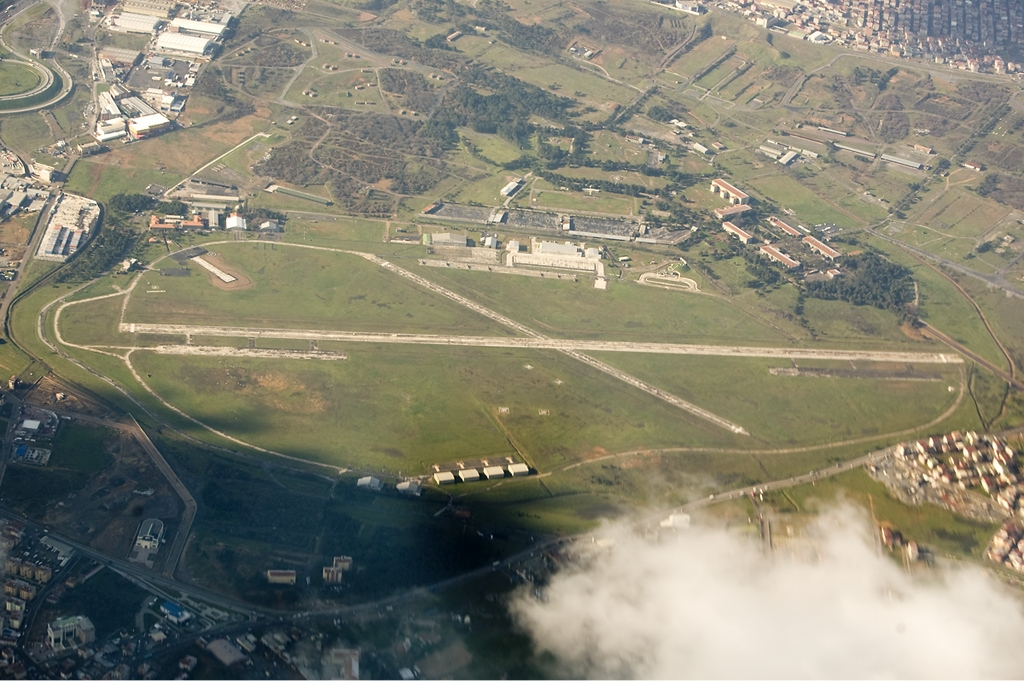
- IATA: none; ICAO: LTBX

Summary
- Airport type: Military
- Owner: Turkish Army
- Operator: 4th Army Aviation Regiment, First Army
- Serves: Istanbul, Turkey
- Location: Samandıra, Istanbul
- Elevation AMSL: 403.5 ft / 123 m
- Coordinates: 40°59′34″N 029°12′56″E

Map
- Location of airport in Turkey

Runways
Direction	Length		Surface
Direction	m	ft	Surface
04/22	1,372	4,500	concrete
18/36	764	2,506	concrete

Samandıra Army Air Base, (Turkish: Samandıra Kara Hava Üssü) (ICAO: LTBX) is a military airport of the Turkish Army located in Sancaktepe district of Istanbul, Turkey. The air base is home to 4th Army Aviation Regiment of the Turkish First Army.

The facility is situated within the Gen. İsmail Hakkı Tunaboylu Barracks just north of the Anatolian Motorway O-4. Two helicopter squadrons are stationed at the army air base, each operating ten UH-1H Iroquois and ten UH-60A Black Hawk. In addition, eight UH-1H and three Cessna T182TSkylane are available for use to the HQ of the regiment.

== Other airports in Istanbul ==
- Atatürk Airport
- Istanbul Sabiha Gökçen International Airport
- Hezarfen Airfield
- Istanbul Airport
