= Baribsi =

Village in Tikare Department, Burkina Faso

Baribsi Baribci
- Location in Burkina Faso
- Coordinates: 13°20′06″N 1°42′59″W
- Country: Burkina Faso
- Region: Centre-Nord Region
- Province: Bam Province
- Department: Tikare Department

Population (2019)
  - Total: 907
- Time zone: UTC+0 (GMT 0)

Baribsi is a town in the Tikare Department of Bam Province in northern Burkina Faso.

Population
Year	Pop.	±%
1985	468	—
2006	741	+58.3%
2019	907	+22.4%
