= Gasongo =

Village in Tikare Department, Burkina Faso

Gasongo Gassanga
- Location in Burkina Faso
- Coordinates: 13°16′N 1°40′W
- Country: Burkina Faso
- Region: Centre-Nord Region
- Province: Bam Province
- Department: Tikare Department

Population (2019)
  - Total: 1,093
- Time zone: UTC+0 (GMT 0)

Gasongo is a village in the Tikare Department of Bam Province in northern Burkina Faso.

Population
Year	Pop.	±%
1985	526	—
2006	837	+59.1%
2019	1,093	+30.6%
