= Manégtaba-Foulbé =

Village in Tikare Department, Burkina Faso

- Country: Burkina Faso
- Region: Centre-Nord Region
- Province: Bam Province
- Department: Tikare Department

Population (2019)
  - Total: 335
- Time zone: UTC+0 (GMT 0)

Manégtaba-Foulbé is a village in the Tikare Department of Bam Province in northern Burkina Faso.

Population
Year	Pop.	±%
2006	271	—
2019	335	+23.6%
