= Ouampèga =

Village in Tikare Department, Burkina Faso

Ouampèga Wampega
- Location in Burkina Faso
- Coordinates: 13°19′N 1°41′W
- Country: Burkina Faso
- Region: Centre-Nord Region
- Province: Bam Province
- Department: Tikare Department

Population (2019)
  - Total: 769
- Time zone: UTC+0 (GMT 0)

Ouampèga is a village in the Tikare Department of Bam Province in northern Burkina Faso.

Population
Year	Pop.	±%
1985	308	—
2006	490	+59.1%
2019	769	+56.9%
