= Touga =

Village in Tikare Department, Burkina Faso

- Location in Burkina Faso
- Coordinates: 13°27′N 1°48′W
- Country: Burkina Faso
- Region: Centre-Nord Region
- Province: Bam Province
- Department: Tikare Department

Population (2019)
  - Total: 1,351
- Time zone: UTC+0 (GMT 0)

Touga is a village in the Tikare Department of Bam Province in northern Burkina Faso.

Population
Year	Pop.	±%
1985	552	—
2006	747	+35.3%
2019	1,351	+80.9%
