= Manégtaba-Mossi =

Village in Tikare Department, Burkina Faso

- Country: Burkina Faso
- Region: Centre-Nord Region
- Province: Bam Province
- Department: Tikare Department

Population (2019)
  - Total: 3,380
- Time zone: UTC+0 (GMT 0)

Manégtaba-Mossi is a town in the Tikare Department of Bam Province in northern Burkina Faso.

Population
| Year | Pop. | ±% |
|---|---|---|
| 2006 | 2,417 | — |
| 2019 | 3,380 | +39.8% |
