= Tanhoka =

Village in Tikare Department, Burkina Faso

- Interactive map of Tanhoka
- Country: Burkina Faso
- Region: Centre-Nord Region
- Province: Bam Province
- Department: Tikare Department

Population (2019)
  - Total: 481
- Time zone: UTC+0 (GMT 0)

Tanhoka is a village in the Tikare Department of Bam Province in northern Burkina Faso.

Population
Year	Pop.	±%
1985	347	—
2006	374	+7.8%
2019	481	+28.6%
