= Söz Vermiş Şarkılar =

Compilation album by Murathan Mungan
- Released: June 9, 2004
- Genre: Pop
- Length: 67:39
- Label: ADA

Söz Vermiş Şarkılar
- Author: Murathan Mungan
- Cover artist: Nihat Odabaşı, Ali Gürevin
- Language: Turkish
- Genre: Lyric poetry
- Publisher: Metis
- Publication date: March 2006
- Publication place: Turkey
- Pages: 132
- ISBN: 978-975-342-555-1
- Preceded by: Elli Parça (2005)

Söz Vermiş Şarkılar is an album released in 2004 and a book released in 2006 by Murathan Mungan. The book contains 82 lyrics written by Mungan, which 18 of those are compiled in the musical album. Three songs "İstersen Hiç Başlamasın", "Çember" and "Otel Odaları" are featured in then unreleased musical "Şarkıcı Kız Kezban'ın Önlenebilir Tırmanışı" by Mungan. Every song in the album is performed by a different popular Turkish musician. Turkish rock singer Cem Karaca also performed in the album, which was released after his death.

== Track listing ==
#	Title	translation	performed by	composed by	time
1	"Maskeli Balo"	Masquerade	Athena	Manos Loïzos	3:45
2	"Aşk Yeniden"	Love again	Nükhet Duru	Derya Köroğlu	3:48
3	"Kimdi Giden Kimdi Kalan"		Aylin Aslım	Selim Atakan	3:33
4	"Sevgili"	Lover	Sezen Aksu	Thanos Mikroutsikos	4:21
5	"Fırtına"	Storm	Rashit	Derya Köroğlu	3:26
6	"İstemeyerek İstemeyerek"	Unwillingly	Göksel	Serdar Ataşer	3:44
7	"Çember"	Circle	Candan Erçetin	Selim Atakan	4:16
8	"Sesler Yüzler Sokaklar"	Sounds, faces, streets	Zuhal Olcay	Selim Atakan	3:55
9	"Dönmek"	To return	Hümeyra	Derya Köroğlu	2:58
10	"Olmasa Mektubun"		Müslüm Gürses	Manos Loïzos	3:41
11	"Hançer"	Dagger	Ajda Pekkan	Selim Atakan	4:25
12	"Ağır Kapı"	Heavy door	Teoman	Derya Köroğlu	4:17
13	"Otel Odaları"	Hotel rooms	Gülden Karaböcek	Selim Atakan	3:34
14	"Telli Telli"		Mor ve Ötesi	Manos Loïzos	3:08
15	"Dağınık Yatak"		Zerrin Özer	Selim Atakan	4:08
16	"Göç Yolları"		Cem Karaca	Derya Köroğlu	4:10
17	"Bir Kadın Nasıl Döner Köşeyi"	How a woman gets rich?	Deniz Türkali	Selim Atakan	2:45
18	"İstersen Hiç Başlamasın"	Don't start if don't you want	Ayten Alpman	Selim Atakan	3:45

- all lyrics by: Murathan Mungan
