= Ritimyinga =

Village in Tikare Department, Burkina Faso

Ritimyinga Ritimynga
- Location in Burkina Faso
- Country: Burkina Faso
- Region: Centre-Nord Region
- Province: Bam Province
- Department: Tikare Department

Population (2019)
  - Total: 1,232
- Time zone: UTC+0 (GMT 0)

Ritimyinga is a village in the Tikare Department of Bam Province in northern Burkina Faso.

Population
Year	Pop.	±%
1985	465	—
2006	850	+82.8%
2019	1,232	+44.9%
