= Koulniéré =

Village in Tikare Department, Burkina Faso

- Country: Burkina Faso
- Region: Centre-Nord Region
- Province: Bam Province
- Department: Tikare Department

Population (2019)
  - Total: 2,206
- Time zone: UTC+0 (GMT 0)

Koulniéré is a village in the Tikare Department of Bam Province in northern Burkina Faso.

Population
| Year | Pop. | ±% |
|---|---|---|
| 1985 | 822 | — |
| 2006 | 1,473 | +79.2% |
| 2019 | 2,206 | +49.8% |
