= Yelkoto =

Village in Tikare Department, Burkina Faso

- Location in Burkina Faso
- Coordinates: 13°20′N 1°43′W
- Country: Burkina Faso
- Region: Centre-Nord Region
- Province: Bam Province
- Department: Tikare Department

Population (2019)
  - Total: 823
- Time zone: UTC+0 (GMT 0)

Yelkoto is a village in the Tikare Department of Bam Province in northern Burkina Faso.

Population
Year	Pop.	±%
1985	443	—
2006	492	+11.1%
2019	823	+67.3%
