= Ipala, Bam =

Village in Tikare Department, Burkina Faso

Ipala
- Location in Burkina Faso
- Coordinates: 13°20′N 1°46′W
- Country: Burkina Faso
- Region: Centre-Nord Region
- Province: Bam Province
- Department: Tikare Department

Population (2019)
  - Total: 600
- Time zone: UTC+0 (GMT 0)

Ipala is a village in the Tikare Department of Bam Province in northern Burkina Faso.

Population
Year	Pop.	±%
1985	425	—
2006	479	+12.7%
2019	600	+25.3%
