= Téonsgo =

Village in Tikare Department, Burkina Faso

Téonsgo Tehonsogo
- Location in Burkina Faso
- Coordinates: 13°22′N 1°47′W
- Country: Burkina Faso
- Region: Centre-Nord Region
- Province: Bam Province
- Department: Tikare Department

Population (2019)
  - Total: 216
- Time zone: UTC+0 (GMT 0)

Téonsgo is a village in the Tikare Department of Bam Province in northern Burkina Faso.

Population
Year	Pop.	±%
1985	149	—
2006	252	+69.1%
2019	216	−14.3%
