= Murathan Mungan =

Turkish author, short story writer, playwright, and poet (born 1955)

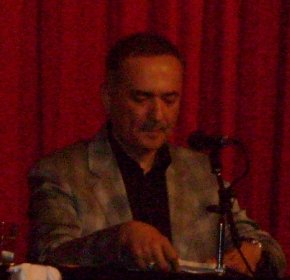
- Mungan in 2008
- Born: 21 April 1955 (age 71); Istanbul, Turkey
- Occupations: Author; poet
- Writing career
- Years active: 1980–present

Murathan Mungan (born 21 April 1955) is a Turkish author, short story writer, playwright, and poet.

== Biography ==
Mungan's family originates from Mardin. His father is an Arab and mother is a Bosniak. After receiving his BA from the Faculty of Letters and Drama at Ankara University, he worked as a dramaturg before devoting all his time to writing poetry, plays, short stories, novels, film scenarios, and songs. His first collection of poems, Osmanlıya Dair Hikayat (Stories about Ottomans) was published in 1980, making Mungan an overnight success.

His output remained prolific and various poetry books followed, notably Yaz Gecer (Summer Passes) and Metal. He has written four theatre plays, which earned him wider success. Mahmud ile Yezida, Taziye are two of the most staged plays of the modern Turkish theatre. He was chosen as the best playwright, together with Mehmet Baydın, by the Ankara Art Association for his staging of the play Condolences, the second book of the Mesopotamia Trilogy, in 1984.

His short stories were compiled in successful volumes such as Kırk Oda (Forty Rooms) and Paranın Cinleri (Genies of Money). His screenplay Dağınık Yatak (Messy Bed) was later filmed by director Atıf Yılmaz in 1986 starring Turkish actress Müjde Ar.

Mungan also wrote lyrics to some of Yeni Türkü's songs, and for pop singers such as Nükhet Duru.

In 2006, Murathan Mungan supervised the production of a music album by Turkish arabesk singer Müslüm Gürses, featuring cover versions of popular songs such as "Alexandra Leaving" by Leonard Cohen, "Mr. Tambourine Man" by Bob Dylan, and "I'm Deranged" by David Bowie, all of which were selected by Mungan.

Openly gay, Mungan has been often associated with the Turkish gay movement as a gay icon.

== Discography ==
- Söz Vermiş Şarkılar (2004, tribute album)
- Aşk Tesadüfleri Sever (2006, supervisor)
- 2020 Model (2020, tribute album)

== Publications ==
- Mahmud ile Yezida (1980)
- Osmanlıya dair Hikâyat (1981)
- "Boyacıköy’de Kanlı Bir Aşk Cinayeti" (short story) (1982)
- Taziye (1982)
- Kum Saati (Hourglass) (1984)
- Son İstanbul (1985)
- Sahtiyan (1985)
- Cenk Hikâyeleri (Combat Stories) (1986)
- Kırk Oda (Forty Rooms) (1987)
- Lal Masallar (1989)
- Eski 45'likler (1989)
- Yaz Sinemaları (Summer Cinemas) (1989)
- Mırıldandıklarım (1990)
- Yaz Geçer (1992)
- Yaz Geçer (special printing-1992)
- Geyikler Lanetler (1992)
- Bir Garip Orhan Veli (1993)
- Oda, Poster ve Şeylerin Kederi (1993)
- Omayra (1993)
- Kaf Dağının Önü (1994)
- Metal (1994)
- Murathan’95 (1996)
- Li Rojhilatê Dilê Min (1996)
- Paranın Cinleri (1997)
- Başkasının Hayatı (Another's Life) (1997)
- Dağınık Yatak (1997)
- Dört Kişilik Bahçe (Garden for Four) (1997)
- Oyunlar İntiharlar Şarkılar (1997)
- Mürekkep Balığı (Squid) (1997)
- Başkalarının Gecesi (Another's Night) (1997)
- Metinler Kitabı (1998)
- Üç Aynalı Kırk Oda (1999)
- Doğduğum Yüzyıla Veda (1999)
- Meskalin (2000)
- 13+1 (2000)
- Soğuk Büfe (2001)
- Erkekler İçin Divan (2001)
- Yüksek Topuklar (2002)
- 7 Mühür (2002)
- Timsah Sokak Şiirleri (2003)
- Yabancı Hayvanlar (Foreign Animals) (2003)
- Çador (2004)
- Bir Kutu Daha (One More Box) (2004)
- Beşpeşe (alongside Elif Şafak, Pınar Kür, Faruk Ulay, Celil Oker) (2004)
- Eteğimdeki Taşlar (2004)
- Elli Parça (Fifty Pieces) (2005)
- Söz Vermiş Şarkılar (2006)
- Kâğıt Taş Kumaş (Rock Paper Fabric) (2007)
- Kullanılmış Biletler (Used Tickets) (2007)
- Yedi Kapılı Kırk Oda (2007)
- Dağ (Mountain) (2007)
- Kadından Kentler (2008)
- Bazı Yazlar Uzaktan Geçer (2009)
- Hayat Atölyesi (2009)
- Eldivenler Hikâyeler (2010)
- İkinci Hayvan (2010)
- Gelecek (Future)) (2010)
- Kibrit Çöpleri (Burnt Matchsticks) (2010)
- Şairin Romanı (2011)
- Aşkın Cep Defteri (Love's Notebook) (2012)
- Bir Dersim Hikâyesi (2012)
- Li Rojhilate Dile Min/Kalbimin Doğusunda (2012)
- Tuğla (Brick) (2012)
- Mutfak (Kitchen) (2013)
- Kadınlar Arasında (Between Women) (2014)
- Merhaba Asker (2014)
- Harita Metot Defteri (2015)
- Aşk İçin Ne Yazdıysam (2016)
- Solak Defterler (2016)
- Dokuz Anahtarlı Kırk Oda (2019)
- Çağ Geçitleri (2019)
- Hamamname (2020)
- Aile Albümü (2021)
- Erkekler Yalnizliklar: Murathan Munganin Sectikleriyle (2021)
- Işığına Tavşan Olduğum Filmler (2022)
- Evrak Çantası (2022)
- 995 km (2023)

== Translations of his works into English ==
Cenk Hikâyeleri in Turkish

- USA - "Valor: Stories" translated into English by Aron Aji and David Gramling, 2022.
