= Boubou Macoutes =

Nickname of welfare fraud inspectors in Quebec, Canada

Les Boubou Macoutes was the popular nickname of special inspectors who investigated and visited the homes of those suspected of welfare fraud in the Canadian province of Quebec during the second government of Premier Robert Bourassa, in the 1990s.

The phrase derives from a combination of Boubou, the popular nickname of Robert Bourassa, and the Tonton Macoutes – the secret police of Haiti under Papa Doc (François Duvalier) and Baby Doc (Jean-Claude Duvalier).

This expression reappeared in the 2010s, in the same context.

== See also ==
- Nicknames of politicians and personalities in Quebec
- Politics of Quebec
