= Kurban (band) =

Turkish heavy metal band

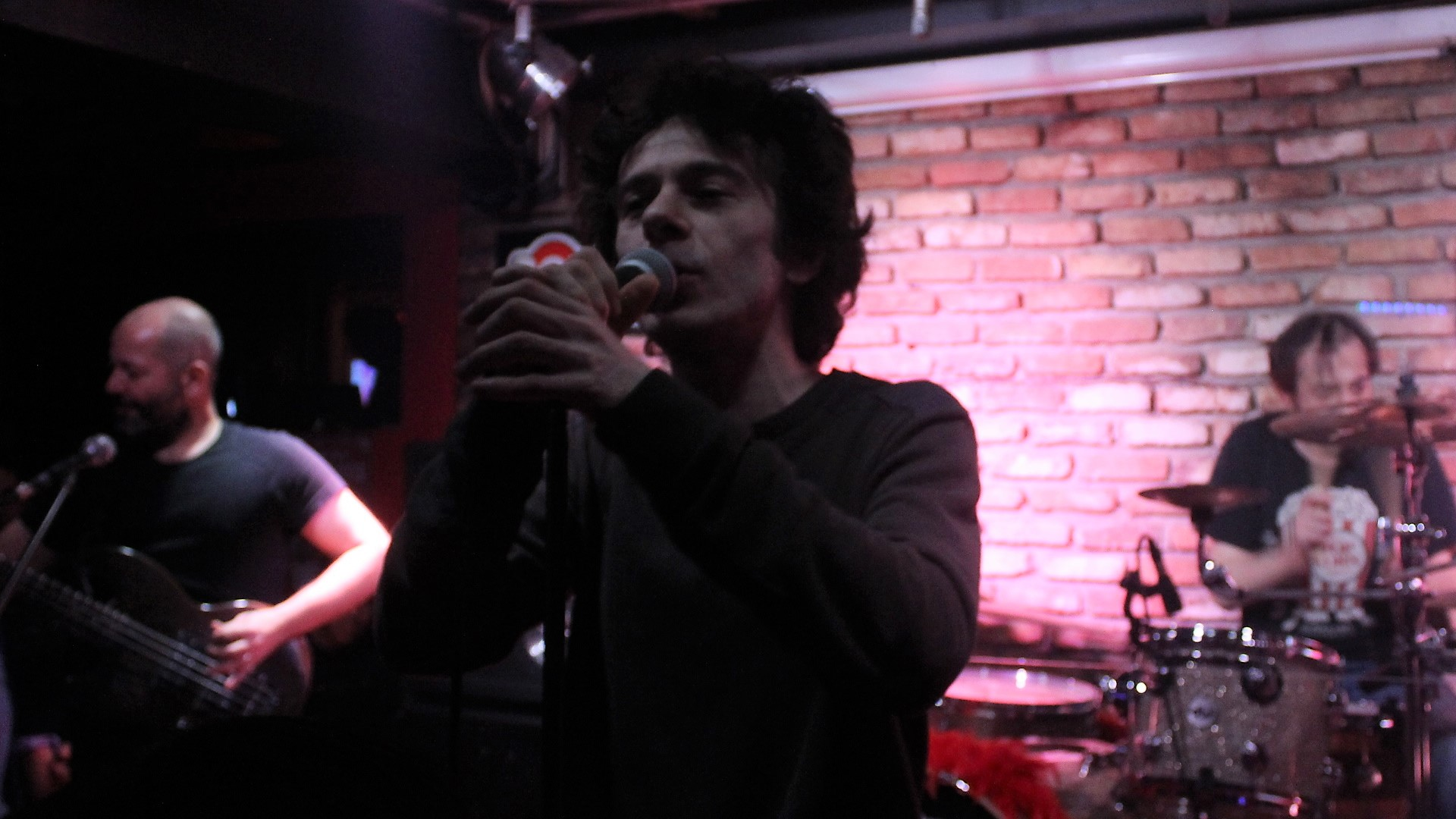
- Tüzün, Yılmaz, and Gürpınar, during their Ankara concert. (December 2014)

Background information
- Origin: Turkey
- Genres: Heavy metal, thrash metal
- Years active: 1995–2005; 2006–2017
- Labels: Raks Müzik, Ece Müzik, Pasaj, Favela Records
- Past members: Deniz Yılmaz; Kerem Tüzün; Burak Gürpınar; Özgür Kankaynar; Umut Gökçen
- Website: kurban.com

Kurban were a Turkish heavy metal band formed in 1995. The band's members were Kerem Tüzün, Burak Gürpınar, Deniz Yılmaz and Özgür Kankaynar.

The band opened for Metallica in 1999 at the Ali Sami Yen Stadium, and opened for Megadeth in RockIstanbul 2005.

The band broke up briefly in 2005, but reunited soon after - in late December 2006. In 2010, Kurban released an album titled Sahip.

== Career ==
Kurban was founded in 1995, then called Outside. Under this name, the band played covers of foreign rock songs. In 1997 they changed their name to Kurban. In the same year the band took part in the Roxy Music Awards competition and became third. In January 1999, the band released their first album Kurban. After opening for Metallica in 1999, guitarist Umut Gökçen moved to the US to live with his fiancée, and the band started looking for a new guitar player. In 2000, they made a soundtrack for a movie named Beans, which starred actor Haluk Bilginer. The band included Özgür Kankaynar soon after. In 2004, Kurban released the album Sert. In 2005, Kurban continued with a new album, İnsanlar. Kurban opened for Megadeth at Rockİstanbul 2005.

The band broke up in June, 2005. Deniz Yılmaz continued with the group Panik. Drummer Burak Gürpınar joined Athena, bassist of the group Kerem Tüzün collaborated with Demir Demirkan, and the guitarist Özgür Kankaynar, continued his career playing with the band So Loud and several other groups in France. The band had an era of acoustic, but they could not get to the end of it due to the break-up.

Kurban members got together again on 31 December 2006. They started playing live in several cities, especially İstanbul and İzmir. Due to the military service of vocal Deniz Yılmaz, the band went on hiatus for 15 months.

Kurban released their fourth album on 23 March 2010, named Sahip. This is the first album Kurban have released after their reunion. Kurban played alongside many important rock bands, Limp Bizkit and Motörhead among them. To contribute to the foundation for the 2011 Van earthquake, the band played in Maçka Küçükçiftlik Park, alongside Hayko Cepkin, Aslı, Pamela, Duman, Gripin, Malt, Melis Danişmend, Moğollar, Redd, Haluk Levent and group Model. In 2012 they released a single called "Usulca". Later in 2014 and 2015 they released singles "Nafile and "İyi Ol" respectively.

Kurban disbanded again in November 2017 due to Deniz Yılmaz's personal issues. Although the disband, the band released their last single Gülümse in August 2022, first announced in 2018. The band took action for their single named Damla. While soloist Deniz Yılmaz shared the intro of the song with a short video on his Instagram account, another member of the group, Özgür Kankaynar, also announced that the song would be released. The completed song was released on all digital platforms on October 7, 2022.

== Group Members ==
=== Old Members ===
- Deniz Yılmaz - vocal, guitar (1995 - 2005, 2007 - 2017)
- Özgür Kankaynar - guitar, back vocal (1999 - 2005, 2007 - 2017)
- Kerem Tüzün - bassist, back vocal (1995 - 2005, 2007 - 2017)
- Burak Gürpınar - drums (1995 - 2005, 2007 - 2017)
- Umut Gökçen - guitar (1995 - 1999)

== Discography ==
=== Albums ===
Yıl	Albüm Bilgileri	Liste Pozisyonları		
Yıl	Albüm Bilgileri	TR	US	UK
1999	Kurban: Sürüm: 1999; Şirket: Raks Müzik; Format: CD	-	-	-
2004	Sert: Sürüm: Şubat 2004; Şirket: GRJ; Format: CD	-	-	-
2005	İnsanlar: Sürüm: 6 Mayıs 2005; Şirket: Pasaj Müzik; Format: CD	-	-	-
2010	Sahip: Sürüm: Mart 2010; Şirket: Favela; Format: CD	-	-	-
"—" notu listeye giremeyen albümler içindir.(Kurban albümlerini içeren herhangi bir müzik listesi bulunamamıştır)

Kurban (Raks Müzik) (1999)

1. Intro
2. Gelme (Don't Come)
3. Ben Değilim (It's not Me)
4. Yalan (Lie)
5. İstersin (You Only Want)
6. Yalaka (Lackey)
7. Sorma (Don't Ask)
8. Kurban (The Victim)
9. Yemen Türküsü (Yemen Ballad)
10. Dur Gitme (Wait Don't Go)
11. Son Söz (The Last Word)
12. Wonderful Tonight
13. Outro

Sert (Hard) (Ece Müzik) (2004)

1. Intro
2. Sarı Çizmeli Mehmet Ağa (Mehmet Agha with the Yellow Boots or John Doe)
3. Namus Belası (Trouble of Purity)
4. Ağlama Değmez Hayat (Don't Cry This World isn't Worth It)
5. Hayvan (Animal)
6. Yalan (Lie)
7. Yosma (Coquette)
8. Haberin Yok (You Don't Know)
9. Lambaya Püf De (Puff the Lamp)
10. Zorba (Bully)

İnsanlar (People) (Pasaj) (2005)

1. A Bir (A1)
2. Suç Bende (It's My Fault)
3. Yine (Again)
4. Uyut Beni (Put Me to Sleep)
5. Cennet (Heaven)
6. Zor Güzel (Stiff Beauty)
7. A
8. Yok (Away)
9. İnsanlar (People)
10. Sus (Hush)
11. Sakın Söyleme (Don't You Dare to Tell)
12. Ben (I)
13. Ağla (Cry)
14. Göç (Migration)

Sahip (Master) (Favela Records) (2010)

1. Hakim (Judge)
2. İfrit (Ifrit)
3. Güneş (Sun)
4. Soykıran (Genocider)
5. Sahip (Master)
6. Yobaz (Bigot)
7. Son Emir (The Final Command)
8. Das Motiv (The Motif)
9. Mesih (Messiah)
10. Misafir (Guest)
11. Ateş Var Mı? (Do You Have a Lighter? )

=== Singles ===
- 2014: Usulca
- 2014: Nafile
- 2015: İyi Ol
- 2022: Gülümse
- 2022: Damla
