= Yob =

Yob, yobbo, yobs, or variants thereof may refer to:

== Language ==
- Yob (slang), a pejorative slang term for 'an uncouth youth' in British English
- Yoba language, once spoken on New Guinea (ISO 639-3:yob)

== People with the surname Yob ==
- Chuck Yob (born 1937), American politician
- Gregory Yob (1945–2005), American computer game designer

== Arts and entertainment ==
=== Music ===
- Yob (band), an American doom metal group
- "Yob" (song), 1998, by TISM
- The Boys (UK band), also known as "The Yobs"

=== Other media ===
- "The Yob", a 1988 Comic Strip Presents... television episode
- Yobs, a comic strip by Tony Husband in satirical news magazine Private Eye

== Other uses ==
- Youth On Board, U.S. nonprofit organization founded in 1994
- Year of birth
