= Hamdallaye, Burkina Faso =

Village in Tikare Department, Burkina Faso

Hamdallaye Hamdalaye
- Country: Burkina Faso
- Region: Centre-Nord Region
- Province: Bam Province
- Department: Tikare Department

Population (2019)
  - Total: 499
- Time zone: UTC+0 (GMT 0)

Hamdallaye is a village in the Tikare Department of Bam Province in northern Burkina Faso.

Population
Year	Pop.	±%
1985	379	—
2006	398	+5.0%
2019	499	+25.4%
