= Yemen Türküsü =

Yemen Türküsü is a Turkish folk song (türkü means Turkish folk song) about Turkish soldiers who were sent to Yemen in World War I to fight a battle against Rebel Arabs for the Ottoman Empire. They went to Yemen from Elazığ, a city in the east of Turkey. They all died in Yemen. So after that tragedy, the Yemen song was written by the local people of Elazığ for the memories of soldiers' death in Yemen.

== Lyrics ==
Below are the lyrics in Turkish, and English:

Havada bulut yok bu ne dumandır
Mahlede ölü yok bu ne şivandır
Şu Yemen elleri ne de yamandır

Ah o Yemen'dir gülü çemendir
Giden gelmiyor acep nedendir
Burası Muş'tur yolu yokuştur
Giden gelmiyor acep ne iştir

Kışlanın önünde çalınır sazlar
Ayağı yalınayak yüreğim sızlar
Yemen'e gidene ağlıyor kızlar

Ah o Yemen'dir gülü çemendir
Giden gelmiyor acep nedendir
Burası Muş'tur yolu yokuştur
Giden gelmiyor acep ne iştir

Kışlanın önünde redif sesi var
Bakın çantasına aceb nesi var
Bir çift kundurası bir de fesi var

Ah o Yemen'dir gülü çemendir
Giden gelmiyor acep nedendir
Burası Muş'tur yolu yokuştur
Giden gelmiyor acep ne iştir

Kışlanın önünde geziyor kazlar
Elim kolum ağrır yüreğim sızlar
Yemen'e gidene ağlıyor kızlar

Ah o Yemen'dir gülü çemendir
Giden gelmiyor acep nedendir
Burası Muş'tur yolu yokuştur
Giden gelmiyor acep ne iştir

Kışlanın önünde bir binek taşı
Yoklama yapıyor bizim binbaşı
Sefere giderler çavuş onbaşı

Ah o Yemen'dir gülü çemendir
Giden gelmiyor acep nedendir
Burası Muş'tur yolu yokuştur
Giden gelmiyor acep ne iştir

There is no cloud in the air, What is that smoke?
There is no death in the neighborhood, What is that cry?
Those Yemen lands are so rugged

Over there is Yemen, its rose is Fenugreek
Those who go never return, Why?
This is Muş, its roads are steep
Those who go never return, What's going on?

Saz is being played in front of the barracks
It's giving me heartache that he's barefoot
Girls cry to the ones who went to Yemen

Over there is Yemen, its rose is Fenugreek
Those who go never return, Why?
This is Muş, its roads are steep
Those who go never return, What's going on?

There is a repeated voice in front of the barracks,
Look in his bag I wonder what he has,
A pair of shoes and a fez!

Over there is Yemen, its rose is Fenugreek
Those who go never return, Why?
This is Muş, its roads are steep
Those who go never return, What's going on?

In front of the barracks, geese are strolling
My arms and legs ache, my heart is grieving
The girls weep for those gone to Yemen

Ah, that Yemen, its rose was Fenugreek
Those who go never return—what could be the reason?
This is Muş, its path is steep
Those who go never return—what kind of affair is this?

In front of the barracks, there's a mounting stone
Our major is conducting roll call
The sergeants and corporals march off to war

Ah, that Yemen, its rose was Fenugreek
Those who go never return—what could be the reason?
This is Muş, its path is steep
Those who go never return—what kind of affair is this?
