= Kilou, Bam =

Village in Tikare Department, Burkina Faso

Kilou
- Location in Burkina Faso
- Coordinates: 13°19′N 1°40′W
- Country: Burkina Faso
- Region: Centre-Nord Region
- Province: Bam Province
- Department: Tikare Department

Population (2019)
  - Total: 1,566
- Time zone: UTC+0 (GMT 0)

Kilou is a village in the Tikaré Department of Bam Province in northern Burkina Faso.

== Demographics ==
Population
Year	Pop.	±%
1985	734	—
2006	1,099	+49.7%
2019	1,566	+42.5%
