= Rashit =

Turkish punk rock band

- Origin: Istanbul, Turkey
- Genres: Punk rock
- Years active: 1993–present
- Labels: Kod; Ada; Sony
- Members: Oğuz Taktak; Tolga Özbey; Levent Özer; Bülent Kabaş; Orkun Tunç
- Past members: Adem Kurt; Murat Yeşil; Gökhan Tunçişler; Atilla Kırçelli; Erdem Helvacıoğlu
- Website: www.rashit.com

Rashit is a Turkish punk rock band founded in Istanbul in 1993 by Tolga Özbey (guitar), Adem Kurt (vocals), Murat Yeşil (bass) and Gökhan Tunçişler (drums). They are considered to be the first major local representative of punk rock and inspiring several local punk bands during the late 1990s. In the 16 years, Tolga being the only constant member, Rashit has had numerous lineup changes.

To date, Rashit has released three studio albums and a couple of LPs Kadiköy'den Hareketler, Taksim'de Bangyjumping . Their 1999 album Telaşa Mahal Yok has been regarded by some critics as the milestone for Turkish punk rock genre.

They are particularly known for their use of aggressive lyrics which was titled as "punk'n roll" by themselves during the initial years. Lyrics are often reflect matters of personal/social deviance, anti racism and degenerated politics.

== History ==
=== Formation and early career (1993–1998) ===
Rashit was formed in Istanbul in 1993 by Tolga Özbey. Özbey was inspired by The Clash, Sex Pistols, Dead Kennedys and Dirty Rotten Imbeciles during his early years. Özbey had numerous involvements in many temporary underground groups during this period. With one of his groups named Sert Itham, he managed to arrange a split demo record with Japanese punk group Argue Damnation but after a long hangover night he could not make it to the post office next day and the chance was missed. He stated that he still keeps the record as a remembrance.

After a couple of demo tapes, Rashit had a split 7” with another Turkish band Ask It Why titled as Kadiköy'den Hareketler. The band later recorded a split tape with English punk outfit Active Minds.

Due to continuous personal conflicts among members, the group broke up in 1998; Özbey joined yet another punk group as a bass player. Up to this date, most performances were recorded unprofessionally, almost always copied with a regular cassette player at home and distributed personally by the members.

=== Debut album Telaşa Mahal Yok (1999–2003) ===
In 1999 Özbey formed the group once again with the new members Oğuz Taktak (vocals) and Atilla Kırçelli (guitar). The same year first album Telaşa Mahal Yok was released by Kod Müzik. The total expense for the album was around US$350. 1999-2000 period was mainly occupied by tours and live concerts. Activities were on hold for around a year when Özbey went to New York City. When Özbey was back the group reformed with new recruits Orkun Tunç (drums) and Bülent Kabaş (bass), the two became the permanent members of the group. In 2001 Rashit released another 7”, Taksim'de Bangyjumping through Dutch Kroket Records. Due to financial bottleneck that Kod Müzik suffered, Rashit signed a contract with Ada Müzik in 2002.

=== Adam Olmak Istemiyorum and Herşeyin Bir Bedeli Var (2003–present) ===
With the solid members group went on to release 2 more albums, Adam Olmak İstemiyorum, was released through Ada Müzik and Herşeyin Bir Bedeli Var, was released through Sony Music. These albums helped Rashit to gain recognition both locally and internationally. The group participated among many live concerts and youth festivals. The appearances in Rock'n Coke 2003 and 2007 were harshly criticised by fans as a result of participating in such a capitalist funded organization. During 2007 performance the duet with Teoman was also disapproved by fans, although this was considered as a comeback effort by Teoman. Rashit generally did not address these criticism publicly.

The band released an EP on Valentine's Day 2010 named Dinozor. Also recorded a duet with Gönül Yazar on a Sezen Aksu song, Kibir. Most recently another duet with Nilüfer Yumlu was performed in 2011 for the song Uzak Dur Ateşimden.

Rashit launched a fourth album, Insan Neslinin Sonu in 2013 through Ada Müzik.

== Band members ==
- Vocals: Oğuz Taktak
- Guitar: Tolga Özbey
- Guitar: Levent Özer
- Bass: Bülent Kabaş
- Drums: Orkun Tunç

== Discography ==
- İnsan Neslinin Sonu (2013)
- Dinozor EP (2010)
- Her Şeyin Bir Bedeli Var (2006)
- Adam Olmak İstemiyorum (2003)
- Taksim'de Bangyjumping EP (2001)
- Telaşa Mahal Yok (1999)
- Aksi Istikamet (1999)
- Kadıköy'den Hareketler (1996)
- Sahibinin Sesini Dinleme (1996)
- Ugh em All ! (1994)
