= Zamsé, Bam =

Village in Tikare Department, Burkina Faso

Zamsé
- Location in Burkina Faso
- Coordinates: 13°27′N 1°48′W
- Country: Burkina Faso
- Region: Centre-Nord Region
- Province: Bam Province
- Department: Tikare Department

Population (2019)
  - Total: 882
- Time zone: UTC+0 (GMT 0)

Zamsé is a village in the Tikare Department of Bam Province in northern Burkina Faso.

Population
Year	Pop.	±%
1985	415	—
2006	748	+80.2%
2019	882	+17.9%
