= Tampèlga, Tikare =

Village in Tikare Department, Burkina Faso

Tampèlga
- Country: Burkina Faso
- Region: Centre-Nord Region
- Province: Bam Province
- Department: Tikare Department

Population (2019)
  - Total: 457
- Time zone: UTC+0 (GMT 0)

Tampèlga is a village in the Tikare Department of Bam Province in northern Burkina Faso.

Population
Year	Pop.	±%
1985	195	—
2006	338	+73.3%
2019	457	+35.2%
