= Tikaré, Burkina Faso =

Village in Tikare Department, Burkina Faso

Tikaré
- Location within Burkina Faso, French West Africa
- Coordinates: 13°17′29″N 1°43′34″W
- Country: Burkina Faso
- Region: Centre-Nord Region
- Province: Bam Province
- Department: Rollo Department

Population (2019)
  - Total: 8,855
- Time zone: UTC+0 (GMT)

Tikaré (also Tinkari and Tinari) is a town in Bam Province, Burkina Faso.

Population
Year	Pop.	±%
1985	3,550	—
2006	5,878	+65.6%
2019	8,855	+50.6%
