= Gonga, Bam =

Village in Tikare Department, Burkina Faso

Gonga
- Country: Burkina Faso
- Region: Centre-Nord Region
- Province: Bam Province
- Department: Tikare Department

Population (2019)
  - Total: 1,407
- Time zone: UTC+0 (GMT 0)

Gonga is a village in the Tikare Department of Bam Province in northern Burkina Faso.

Population
Year	Pop.	±%
2006	853	—
2019	1,407	+64.9%
