= Yobaz =

Yobaz is a pejorative Turkish term meaning bigot.

Someone who is overly attached to a thought, a belief, or an ideology. This is sometimes used by secular and liberal Turks towards religious fanatics, usually linking them with intolerance, hypocrisy, and hatefulness. They were also portrayed as dangerous provocateurs of innocent Muslims in the name of "wrong" Islam, as opposed to the "true" Islam which had to be limited to the individuals' private lives.

The Turkish metal band Kurban released, in 2010, a song titled "Yobaz".

== See also ==
- Islamism
- Secularism in Turkey
