= Boubou, Burkina Faso =

Town in Centre-Nord Region, Burkina Faso

Boubou
- Location in Burkina Faso
- Coordinates: 13°22′N 1°48′W
- Country: Burkina Faso
- Region: Centre-Nord Region
- Province: Bam Province
- Department: Tikare Department

Population (2019)
  - Total: 2,126
- Time zone: UTC+0 (GMT 0)

Boubou is a town in the Tikare Department of Bam Province in northern Burkina Faso.

Population
Year	Pop.	±%
1985	1,468	—
2006	1,652	+12.5%
2019	2,126	+28.7%
