= Yoba, Burkina Faso =

Village in Tikare Department, Burkina Faso

Yoba
- Location in Burkina Faso
- Coordinates: 13°26′N 1°49′W
- Country: Burkina Faso
- Region: Centre-Nord Region
- Province: Bam Province
- Department: Tikare Department

Population (2019)
  - Total: 1,268
- Time zone: UTC+0 (GMT 0)

Yoba is a village in the Tikare Department of Bam Province in northern Burkina Faso.

Population
Year	Pop.	±%
1985	628	—
2006	751	+19.6%
2019	1,268	+68.8%
