= Sancé, Bam =

Village in Tikare Department, Burkina Faso

Sancé
- Country: Burkina Faso
- Region: Centre-Nord Region
- Province: Bam Province
- Department: Tikare Department

Population (2019)
  - Total: 1,715
- Time zone: UTC+0 (GMT 0)

Sancé is a town in the Tikare Department of Bam Province in northern Burkina Faso.

Population
| Year | Pop. | ±% |
|---|---|---|
| 1985 | 763 | — |
| 2006 | 1,159 | +51.9% |
| 2019 | 1,715 | +48.0% |
