= Zano, Bam =

Village in Tikare Department, Burkina Faso

Zano, Burkina Faso
- Location in Burkina Faso
- Coordinates: 13°21′N 1°42′W
- Country: Burkina Faso
- Region: Centre-Nord Region
- Province: Bam Province
- Department: Tikare Department

Population (2019)
  - Total: 1,208
- Time zone: UTC+0 (GMT 0)

Zano, Burkina Faso is a village in the Tikare Department of Bam Province in northern Burkina Faso.

Population
Year	Pop.	±%
1985	455	—
2006	741	+62.9%
2019	1,208	+63.0%
