= Yeni Türkü =

Turkish band

- Lead vocalist Derya Köroğlu in a concert as part of 2006 Turkfest of Seattle

Background information
- Years active: 1978–present
- Members: Derya Köroğlu; Erkin Hadimoğlu; Furkan Bilgi; Serdar Barçın
- Website: www.yeniturku.com

Yeni Türkü (means New Türkü in Turkish) is a Turkish band. The group has held concerts and has recorded a number of albums since forming in 1978. Their musical style is characterized by a combination of traditional Turkish and modern musical instruments, including the oud, baglama, kemenche, qanun and guitar. Their music reflects influences of music from around the world (one example is Inti-Illimani). All group members have changed several times throughout the years, with the exception of the lead singer Derya Köroğlu. After the coup of September 12, 1980, the album Buğdayın Türküsü, composed of poems by names such as Nazım Hikmet, was banned. For this reason, Yeni Türkü's career was interrupted for a short time.

== Band members ==
=== Current members ===
- Derya Köroğlu - vocal, guitar, baglama
- Erkin Hadimoğlu - keyboards (1992–present)
- Furkan Bilgi - classical stringed violin (1997–present)
- Serdar Barçın - wind instruments (flute, clarinet) (2001–present)
- Sezer Alemdar - guitar (2003–present)
- Bahadır Tanrıvermiş - drums, percussion (2006–present)

=== Former members ===
- Selim Atakan - piano, flute (1977–1991)
- Zerrin Atakan - vocals (1977–1981, 1983–1986, 1987–1988)
- Eftal Küçük - guitar, kemane, Greek guitar (1979–1985)
- Tuncer Tezcan - baglama, vocals (1980–1985)
- Tuğrul Bayrak - bass guitar (1980–1991)
- Murat Buket - oud (1980–1997)
- Fuat Oburoğlu - wind instruments (flute, clarinet), vocals (1984–1989, 1991–1997)
- Cengiz Onural - guitar, kemence (1985–1997)
- Halis Bütünley - percussion, vocals ("Vira Vira, "Rumeli Konseri") (1989–1991)
- Tayfun Duygulu - wind instruments (soprano saxophone, clarinet) (1989–1991)
- Raci Pişmişoğlu - bass guitar (1997–2006)
- Fatih Ahıskalı - oud (1997–2011)
- Erdinç Şenol - drums, percussion (1999–2006)
- İsmail Soyberk - bass guitar (2008–2021)

Zerrin Atakan became a psychiatrist in the United Kingdom in 1989. She also divorced with Selim Atakan, was married with 1975 at same year. Fuat Oburoğlu founded a band named "Durup Dururken" in 2001, which Tuğrul Bayrak also joined two years later. Durup Dururken released debut album, "Yeryüzüne Merdiven" in 2007. Cengiz Onural and Murat Buket (left from them after 3rd album) formed the İncesaz Group in 1997 and has released 10 albums since 1999. Tayfun Duygulu became a solo vocalist and has released 6 albums since 1993.

== Discography ==
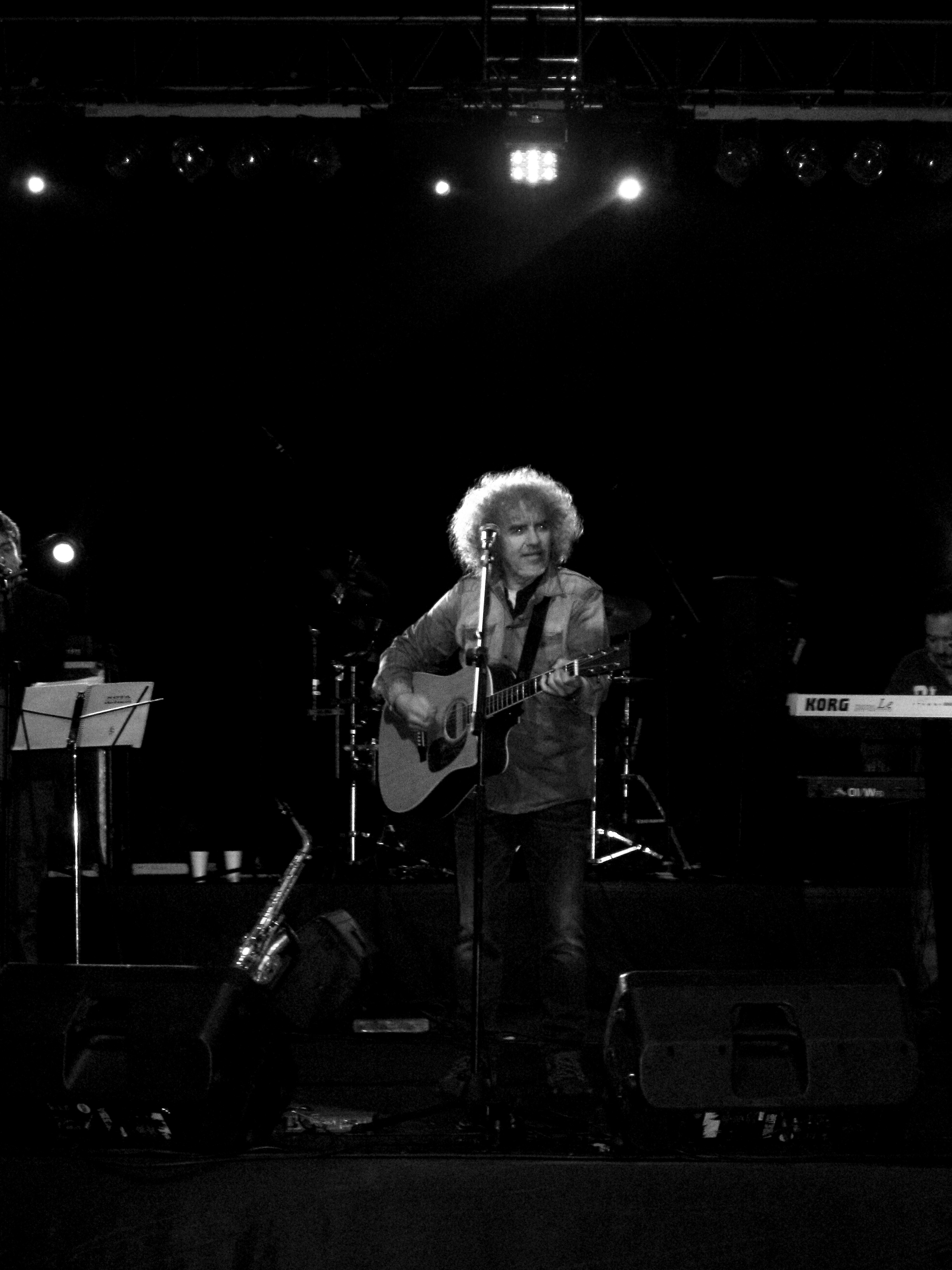
Yeni Türkü, at Boğaziçi University for the Spring Festival, Istanbul,2011.

- Buğdayın Türküsü (LP-MC, 1979)
- Akdeniz Akdeniz (LP-MC-CD, 2 April 1983)
- Film Müzikleri (MC, 1983)
- Çekirdek Sanat Evi Resitali (MC, April 1984)
- Günebakan (LP-MC-CD, 22 July 1986)
- Dünyanın Kapıları (LP-MC-CD, 30 August 1987)
- Yeşilmişik (MC-CD, 24 September 1988)
- Vira Vira (MC-CD, 7 May 1990)
- Rumeli Konseri (MC-CD, 14 July 1991)
- Aşk Yeniden (MC-CD, 28 November 1992)
- Külhani Şarkılar (MC-CD, 3 August 1994)
- Süper Baba - Film Müzikleri (MC-CD, 13 July 1995)
- Telli Telli (Remixes) (CD, 28 August 1996)
- tr:Her Dem Yeni (MC-CD, 2 September 1996)
- "Yeni" (MC-CD, 20 August 1999)
- Koleksiyon (MC-CD, 2003)
- Koleksiyon 2 (CD, 2004)
- Koleksiyon 3 (CD, 25 May 2006)
- Koleksiyon 4 (CD, 2 February 2008)
- Şimdi ve Sonra (CD, May 2012)
