= Konkin =

Konkin may refer to:

- Konkin Foulgo, village in the Zimtenga Department of Bam Province in northern-central Burkina Faso
- Konkin Moogo, village in the Zimtenga Department of Bam Province in northern-central Burkina Faso
- Konkin (surname)

== See also ==
- John Conkin and Clara Layton Harlin House, a historic home in Missouri, USA
- Koankin
- Konk (disambiguation)
