= Conque =

Conque may refer to:

- Conch (instrument), a wind instrument made from a conch shell

== People with the surname ==
- Abraham ben Levi Conque (1648 – after 1689), rabbi and kabbalist in Hebron
- Clint Conque (born 1961), American college football coach

== See also ==
- Conch, a medium- to large-sized sea snail or shell
- Conk (disambiguation)
- Conquer (disambiguation)
- Conques, a former commune in the Aveyron department of France
