= Batanga =

Batanga may refer to:

== Ethnography ==
- Batanga people, of Cameroon and Equatorial Guinea, related to the Duala of Cameroon
- Batanga language, spoken by the Bataga

== Places ==
- Batanga, Burkina Faso, a village in Bam Province, Burkina Faso
- Batanga, Ghana, a community in Kumbungu District in the Northern Region of Ghana
- Grand Batanga, Cameroon

== Other uses ==
- Batanga (cocktail), a mix of tequila and cola
- A music genre created by Bebo Valdés
- Batanga Media, a digital media company focused on the Latino lifestyle and Latin music

== See also ==
- Batangas (disambiguation)
