= Komsilga =

Komsilga is the name of several settlements in Burkina Faso. It may refer to:

- Komsilga, Bam, a village in Bam Department
- Komsilga, Baskouré, a village in Baskouré Department
- Komsilga, Komsilga, a town in the Komsilga Department
