= Batangas (disambiguation) =

Batangas is a province in the Philippines.

Batangas may also refer to:

- Batangas (sword)
- Batangas Bay
- Batangas City
- Batangas International Port, locally known as the Batangas Pier
- Butterfly knife, also known as a "Batangas knife"

== See also ==
- Batanga (disambiguation)
