= Kalagré-mossi =

Village in Zimtenga Department, Burkina Faso

Kalagré-mossi Kolgare-Mossi
- Country: Burkina Faso
- Region: Centre-Nord Region
- Province: Bam Province
- Department: Zimtenga Department

Population (2019)
  - Total: 2,287
- Time zone: UTC+0 (GMT)

Kalagré-mossi is a village in the Zimtenga Department of Bam Province in northern-central Burkina Faso.

Population
Year	Pop.	±%
1985	564	—
2006	1,075	+90.6%
2019 (estimate)	2,287	+112.7%
