= Kalagré-Foulbé =

Village in Zimtenga Department, Burkina Faso

Kalagré-Foulbé Kolgare-Foulbe
- Country: Burkina Faso
- Region: Centre-Nord Region
- Province: Bam Province
- Department: Zimtenga Department

Population (2019)
  - Total: 257
- Time zone: UTC+0 (GMT)

Kalagré-Foulbé is a village in the Zimtenga Department of Bam Province in northern-central Burkina Faso.

Population
Year	Pop.	±%
1985	75	—
2005	121	+61.3%
2019 (estimate)	257	+112.4%
