= Kaokana-Peulh =

Village in Zimtenga Department, Burkina Faso

- Country: Burkina Faso
- Region: Centre-Nord Region
- Province: Bam Province
- Department: Zimtenga Department

Population (2019)
  - Total: 255
- Time zone: UTC+0 (GMT)

Kaokana-Peulh is a village in the Zimtenga Department of Bam Province in northern-central Burkina Faso.

Population
Year	Pop.	±%
2006	120	—
2019 (estimate)	255	+112.5%
