= Wattigué =

Village in Zimtenga Department, Burkina Faso

Wattigué Ouatigue
- Country: Burkina Faso
- Region: Centre-Nord Region
- Province: Bam Province
- Department: Zimtenga Department
- Elevation: 267 m (876 ft)

Population (2019)
  - Total: 483
- Time zone: UTC+0 (GMT)

Wattigué or Ouatigue is a village in the Zimtenga Department of Bam Province in northern-central Burkina Faso.

Population
Year	Pop.	±%
1985	232	—
2006	227	−2.2%
2019 (est.)	483	+112.8%
