= Songédin Yarcé =

Village in Zimtenga Department, Burkina Faso

Songédin Yarcé Sogodin Yarce
- Country: Burkina Faso
- Region: Centre-Nord Region
- Province: Bam Province
- Department: Zimtenga Department

Population (2019)
  - Total: 437
- Time zone: UTC+0 (GMT)

Songédin Yarcé is a village in the Zimtenga Department of Bam Province in northern-central Burkina Faso.

Population
Year	Pop.	±%
1985	336	—
2006	205	−39.0%
2019 (estimate)	437	+113.2%
