= Kargo, Burkina Faso =

Village in Zimtenga Department, Burkina Faso

Coordinates: 13°30′N 1°31′W

Kargo
- Interactive map of Kargo
- Country: Burkina Faso
- Region: Centre-Nord Region
- Province: Bam Province
- Department: Zimtenga Department

Population (2019)
  - Total: 2,997
- Time zone: UTC+0 (GMT)

Kargo is a town in the Zimtenga Department of Bam Province in northern-central Burkina Faso.

Population
Year	Pop.	±%
1985	1,075	—
2006	1,409	+31.1%
2019 (estimate)	2,997	+112.7%
