= Niniongo =

Village in Zimtenga Department, Burkina Faso

Niniongo Nioniogo
- Country: Burkina Faso
- Region: Centre-Nord Region
- Province: Bam Province
- Department: Zimtenga Department

Population (2019)
  - Total: 727
- Time zone: UTC+0 (GMT)

Niniongo is a village in the Zimtenga Department of Bam Province in northern-central Burkina Faso.

Population
Year	Pop.	±%
1985	258	—
2006	342	+32.6%
2019 (estimate)	727	+112.6%
