= Conk (disambiguation) =

Conk was a hairstyle popular among African-American men from the 1920s to 1960s.

Conk may also refer to:

- Conk (fungus), the fruiting body of polyphore fungi

== People ==
- Cemil Conk (1873–1963), officer of the Ottoman Army
- Mehmet Hulusi Conk (1881–c. 1950), officer of the Ottoman Army and Turkish Army

== See also ==
- Conch, a number of different medium to large-sized snails or other shells
- Konk (disambiguation)
- Norman Conks, a Catholic street gang in Glasgow from the 1880s to the 1960s
- Nose, sometimes referred to as conk, especially when large
