= Douré, Burkina Faso =

Village in Zimtenga Department, Burkina Faso

Douré
- Country: Burkina Faso
- Region: Centre-Nord Region
- Province: Bam Province
- Department: Zimtenga Department

Population (2019)
  - Total: 895
- Time zone: UTC+0 (GMT)

Douré is a village in the Zimtenga Department of Bam Province in northern-central Burkina Faso.

Population
Year	Pop.	±%
1985	192	—
2006	421	+119.3%
2019 (estimate)	895	+112.6%
