= Kayon =

Village in Zimtenga Department, Burkina Faso

Coordinates: 13°29′N 1°25′W

- Interactive map of Kayon
- Country: Burkina Faso
- Region: Centre-Nord Region
- Province: Bam Province
- Department: Zimtenga Department

Population (2019)
  - Total: 970
- Time zone: UTC+0 (GMT)

Kayon is a village in the Zimtenga Department of Bam Province in northern-central Burkina Faso.

Population
Year	Pop.	±%
1985	284	—
2006	456	+60.6%
2019 (estimate)	970	+112.7%
