= Singa-Mossi =

Village in Zimtenga Department, Burkina Faso

- Country: Burkina Faso
- Region: Centre-Nord Region
- Province: Bam Province
- Department: Zimtenga Department

Population (2019)
  - Total: 1,531
- Time zone: UTC+0 (GMT)

Singa-Mossi is a village in the Zimtenga Department of Bam Province in northern-central Burkina Faso.

Population
Year	Pop.	±%
1985	431	—
2006	720	+67.1%
2019 (estimate)	1,531	+112.6%
