= Pissi, Bam =

Village in Zimtenga Department, Burkina Faso

Pissi
- Country: Burkina Faso
- Region: Centre-Nord Region
- Province: Bam Province
- Department: Zimtenga Department

Population (2019)
  - Total: 834
- Time zone: UTC+0 (GMT)

Pissi is a village in the Zimtenga Department of Bam Province in northern-central Burkina Faso.

Population
Year	Pop.	±%
1985	187	—
2006	392	+109.6%
2019 (estimate)	834	+112.8%
