= Bangrin, Zimtenga =

Village in Zimtenga Department, Burkina Faso

Bangrin
- Country: Burkina Faso
- Region: Centre-Nord Region
- Province: Bam Province
- Department: Zimtenga Department

Population (2019)
  - Total: 1,583
- Time zone: UTC+0 (GMT)

Bangrin is a village in the Zimtenga Department of Bam Province in northern-central Burkina Faso.

Population
| Year | Pop. | ±% |
|---|---|---|
| 2006 | 744 | — |
| 2019 (estimate) | 1,583 | +112.8% |
