= Singa-Rimaïbé =

Village in Zimtenga Department, Burkina Faso

- Country: Burkina Faso
- Region: Centre-Nord Region
- Province: Bam Province
- Department: Zimtenga Department

Population (2019)
  - Total: 2,593
- Time zone: UTC+0 (GMT)

Singa-Rimaïbé is a town in the Zimtenga Department of Bam Province in northern-central Burkina Faso.

Population
Year	Pop.	±%
1985	577	—
2006	1,219	+111.3%
2019 (estimate)	2,593	+112.7%
