= Zimtenga =

Village in Zimtenga Department, Burkina Faso

Zimtenga Zitenga
- Interactive map of Zimtenga
- Country: Burkina Faso
- Region: Centre-Nord Region
- Province: Bam Province
- Department: Zimtenga Department

Population (2019)
  - Total: 2,518
- Time zone: UTC+0 (GMT)

Zimtenga is a town in the Zimtenga Department of Bam Province in northern-central Burkina Faso. It is the capital of the Zimtenga Department.

Population
Year	Pop.	±%
1985	565	—
2006	1,184	+109.6%
2019 (estimate)	2,518	+112.7%
