= Bonda, Burkina Faso =

Village in Zimtenga Department, Burkina Faso

Bonda
- Location in Burkina Faso
- Coordinates: 13°30′N 1°31′W
- Country: Burkina Faso
- Region: Centre-Nord Region
- Province: Bam Province
- Department: Zimtenga Department

Population (2019)
  - Total: 1,812
- Time zone: UTC+0 (GMT)

Bonda is a village in the Zimtenga Department of Bam Province in northern-central Burkina Faso.

Population
| Year | Pop. | ±% |
|---|---|---|
| 1985 | 490 | — |
| 2006 | 852 | +73.9% |
| 2019 (estimate) | 1,812 | +112.7% |
