= Zimtenga Department =

Department in Bam Province, Burkina Faso

Zimtenga
- Department
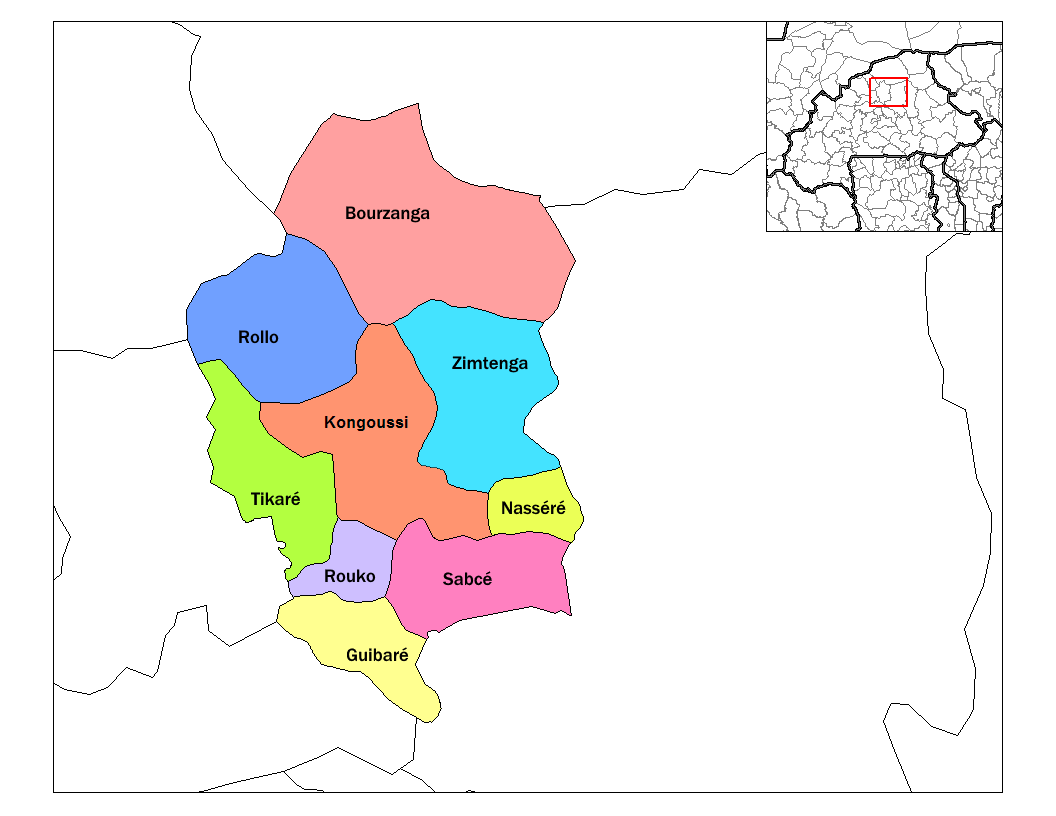
- Zimtenga Department location in the province
- Country: Burkina Faso
- Region: Centre-Nord Region
- Province: Bam Province

Population (1996)
  - Total: 21,879
- Time zone: UTC+0 (GMT 0)

Zimtenga, also spelt Zimtanga, is a department or commune of Bam Province in Centre-Nord Region of Burkina Faso. Its capital lies at the town of Zimtenga. According to the 1996 census the department has a total population of 21,879.

== Towns and villages ==
- Zimtenga (capital)
- Bangrin
- Bargo
- Batanga
- Bayendfoulgo
- Bonda
- Dénéon
- Dougré
- Douré
- Gasdonka
- Kalagré-Foulbé
- Kalagré-Mossi
- Kalagrérimaïbé
- Kaokana-Peulh
- Kargo
- Kayon
- Kiendyendé
- Komsilga
- Konkin-Foulgo
- Konkin-Moogo
- Loa
- Minima
- Moméné
- Niniongo
- Nordé
- Paspanga
- Pètakakisgou
- Pissi
- Rakoegtanga
- Rolga
- Romtanghin
- Siguinvoussé
- Singa-Mossi
- Singa-Rimaïbé
- Sissin
- Songédin-Yarcé
- Tampèlga
- Tankoulounga
- Toéssin
- Wattigué
- Yalgatinga
