= Minima, Burkina Faso =

Village in Zimtenga Department, Burkina Faso

Minima Minama
- Interactive map of Minima
- Country: Burkina Faso
- Region: Centre-Nord Region
- Province: Bam Province
- Department: Zimtenga Department

Population (2019)
  - Total: 2,004
- Time zone: UTC+0 (GMT)

Minima is a village in the Zimtenga Department of Bam Province in northern-central Burkina Faso.

Population
Year	Pop.	±%
1985	591	—
2006	942	+59.4%
2019 (estimate)	2,004	+112.7%
