= Dougré =

Village in Zimtenga Department, Burkina Faso

Dougré Dougoure
- Country: Burkina Faso
- Region: Centre-Nord Region
- Province: Bam Province
- Department: Zimtenga Department

Population (2019)
  - Total: 806
- Time zone: UTC+0 (GMT)

Dougré is a village in the Zimtenga Department of Bam Province in northern-central Burkina Faso.

Population
Year	Pop.	±%
1985	221	—
2006	379	+71.5%
2019 (estimate)	806	+112.7%
