= Moméné =

Village in Zimtenga Department, Burkina Faso

Moméné Momone
- Country: Burkina Faso
- Region: Centre-Nord Region
- Province: Bam Province
- Department: Zimtenga Department

Population (2019)
  - Total: 3,059
- Time zone: UTC+0 (GMT)

Moméné is a town in the Zimtenga Department of Bam Province in northern-central Burkina Faso.

Population
Year	Pop.	±%
1985	857	—
2006	1,438	+67.8%
2019 (estimate)	3,059	+112.7%
