= Loa, Burkina Faso =

Village in Zimtenga Department, Burkina Faso

Coordinates: 13°24′N 1°30′W

- Interactive map of Loa, Burkina Faso
- Country: Burkina Faso
- Region: Centre-Nord Region
- Province: Bam Province
- Department: Zimtenga Department

Population (2019)
  - Total: 942
- Time zone: UTC+0 (GMT)

Loa, Burkina Faso is a village in the Zimtenga Department of Bam Province in northern-central Burkina Faso.

Population
Year	Pop.	±%
2006	443	—
2019 (estimate)	942	+112.6%
