= Nordé =

Village in Zimtenga Department, Burkina Faso

Coordinates: 13°33′N 1°23′W

- Interactive map of Nordé
- Country: Burkina Faso
- Region: Centre-Nord Region
- Province: Bam Province
- Department: Zimtenga Department

Population (2019)
  - Total: 721
- Time zone: UTC+0 (GMT)

Nordé is a village in the Zimtenga Department of Bam Province in northern-central Burkina Faso.

Population
| Year | Pop. | ±% |
|---|---|---|
| 2006 | 339 | — |
| 2019 (estimate) | 721 | +112.7% |
