= Romtanghin =

Village in Zimtenga Department, Burkina Faso

- Country: Burkina Faso
- Region: Centre-Nord Region
- Province: Bam Province
- Department: Zimtenga Department

Population (2019)
  - Total: 2,401
- Time zone: UTC+0 (GMT)

Romtanghin is a village in the Zimtenga Department of Bam Province in northern-central Burkina Faso.

Population
Year	Pop.	±%
2006	1,129	—
2019 (estimate)	2,401	+112.7%
