= Bargo, Burkina Faso =

Village in Zimtenga Department, Burkina Faso

Bargo
- Location in Burkina Faso
- Country: Burkina Faso
- Region: Centre-Nord Region
- Province: Bam Province
- Department: Zimtenga Department

Population (2019)
  - Total: 608
- Time zone: UTC+0 (GMT)

Bargo is a village in the Zimtenga Department of Bam Province in northern-central Burkina Faso.

Population
Year	Pop.	±%
1985	158	—
2006	286	+81.0%
2019 (estimate)	608	+112.6%
