= Dénéon =

Village in Zimtenga Department, Burkina Faso

Coordinates: 13°34′N 1°30′W

- Interactive map of Dénéon
- Country: Burkina Faso
- Region: Centre-Nord Region
- Province: Bam Province
- Department: Zimtenga Department

Population (2019)
  - Total: 1,914
- Time zone: UTC+0 (GMT)

Dénéon is a village in the Zimtenga Department of Bam Province in northern-central Burkina Faso.

Population
Year	Pop.	±%
1985	478	—
2006	900	+88.3%
2019 (estimate)	1,914	+112.7%
