= Konkin Moogo =

Village in Zimtenga Department, Burkina Faso

- Country: Burkina Faso
- Region: Centre-Nord Region
- Province: Bam Province
- Department: Zimtenga Department

Population (2019)
  - Total: 566
- Time zone: UTC+0 (GMT)

Konkin Moogo is a village in the Zimtenga Department of Bam Province in northern-central Burkina Faso.

Population
Year	Pop.	±%
2006	266	—
2019 (estimate)	566	+112.8%
