= John Conkin and Clara Layton Harlin House =

Historic house in Missouri, United States

- U.S. National Register of Historic Places
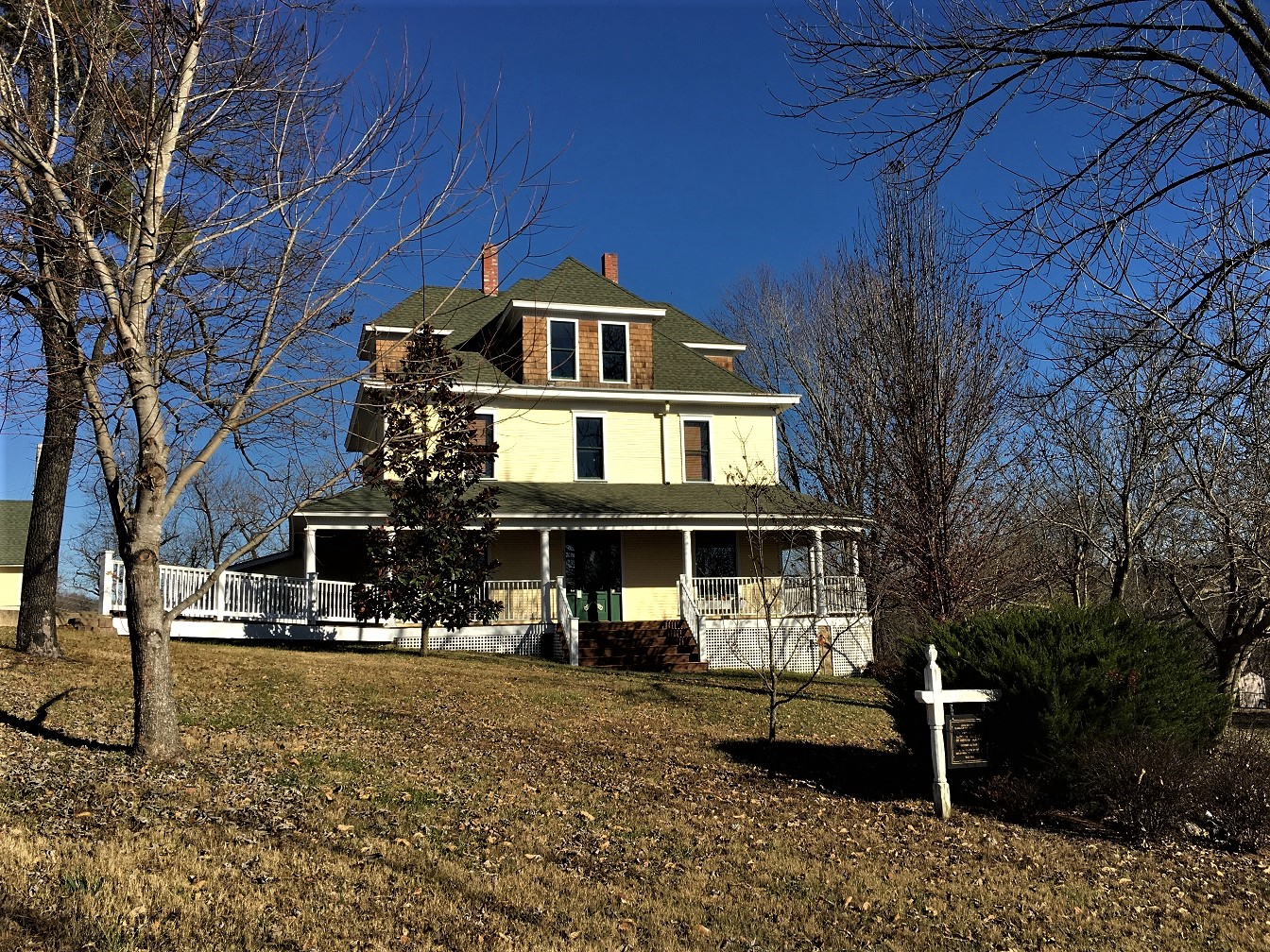

- Location within Missouri Location within the United States
- Location: 403 Harlin Dr., Gainesville, Missouri
- Coordinates: 36°36′20″N 92°25′48″W
- Area: less than one acre
- Built: 1912
- Architectural style: American Four-Square
- NRHP reference No.: 03001065
- Added to NRHP: October 22, 2003

The John Conkin and Clara Layton Harlin House, also known as the Uncle Johnny's and the Old Harlin House, is a historic home located in Gainesville, Ozark County, Missouri. It was built in 1912, and is a 2 1/2-story, American Foursquare style frame dwelling. It sits on a limestone foundation and has a pyramidal roof with hipped roof dormers. It features a one-story wraparound porch with curved corners.

It was listed on the National Register of Historic Places in 2002.
