= Komsilga, Bam =

Village in Zimtenga Department, Burkina Faso

Coordinates: 13.0667°N 0.9333°W

Komsilga
- Interactive map of Komsilga
- Country: Burkina Faso
- Region: Centre-Nord Region
- Province: Bam Province
- Department: Zimtenga Department

Population (2019)
  - Total: 1,729
- Time zone: UTC+0 (GMT)

Komsilga is a village in the Zimtenga Department of Bam Province in northern-central Burkina Faso.

Population
Year	Pop.	±%
1985	480	—
2006	813	+69.4%
2019 (estimate)	1,729	+112.7%
