= Konkin (surname) =

Konkin (Russian: Конкин) is a Russian masculine surname originating from the Greek given name Conon, its feminine counterpart is Konkina. The surname may refer to the following notable people:

- Anastasia Konkina (born 1993), Russian judoka
- Anna Konkina (born 1947), Russian cyclist
- Ksenia Konkina (born 2001), Russian ice dancer.
- Samuel Edward Konkin III (1947–2004), American libertarian philosopher
- Vladimir Konkin (born 1951), Soviet/Russian cinema and theatre actor
