= Abraham ben Levi Conque =

Hebronite rabbi and kabbalist (f. 17th century)

Abraham ben Levi Conque,(Hebrew: אברהם בן לוי קונקי) also spelt Konki and Cuenque, (born 1648) was a 17th-century rabbi and kabbalist in Hebron.

== Life ==
Swayed by his cabalistic studies, Conque threw himself into the Sabbatean movement around Sabbatai Zevi, and became one of the most earnest apostles of the Messiah. Even the apostasy of Zevi did not shake Conque's belief, and he remained until his death a faithful follower.

Conque traveled, as a collector for the poor Jews of Eretz Yisrael, throughout Germany and Russia, and everywhere endeavored to win adherents to the movement. At the request of a friend residing at Frankfort-on-the-Main, he wrote, in 1689, an account of Shabbethai Ẓebi's life, which reveals in the author a peculiar state of mind. The account is full of miracles and prodigies, firmly believed in by Conque. It is referred to in Jacob Emden's history of the Shabbethaian movement, "Zot Torat ha-Ḳena'ot."

Conque was also the author of the following works:

- "Abaḳ Soferim" (Dust of Scholars), Amsterdam, 1704, the first part, under the special title of "Em ha-Yeled," comprises homilies on the Pentateuch; the second, "Uggat Reẓafim," contains Biblical interpretations by himself and others; and the third, "Em la-Binah," consists of nineteen sermons.
- "Minḥat Ḳena'ot" (Offering of Jealousy), a treatise on jealousy.
- "Abaḳ Derakim" (Dust of Roads), a collection of sermons.

The last two are mentioned by Azulai, who claims to have seen them in manuscript.
