= Batanga, Burkina Faso =

Village in Zimtenga Department, Burkina Faso

Coordinates: 13°27′28″N 1°31′02″W

Batanga Battenga
- Interactive map of Batanga
- Country: Burkina Faso
- Region: Centre-Nord Region
- Province: Bam Province
- Department: Zimtenga Department

Population (2019)
  - Total: 1,812
- Time zone: UTC+0 (GMT)

Batanga is a village in the Zimtenga Department of Bam Province in northern-central Burkina Faso.

Population
Year	Pop.	±%
1985	364	—
2006	852	+134.1%
2019 (estimate)	1,812	+112.7%
