= Konk =

Konk or KONK may refer to:

- KONK (AM), a community radio station (1630 AM) in Key West, Florida, United States
- Konk (album), an album by The Kooks
- Konk (band), a 1980s band
- Konk (recording studio), the recording studio and record label owned by The Kinks
- Konk, a character from The Pirates of Dark Water
- Conk, a hair straightener gel
