= 2024–25 FC Sheriff Tiraspol season =

Sheriff Tiraspol
2024–25 season
- Chairman: Viktor Gushan
- Manager: Yuriy Hura (until 5 August); Mislav Karoglan (5 August - 15 April); Victor Mihailov (Interim) (from 15 April)
- Stadium: Sheriff Stadium
- Super Liga: 2nd
- Moldovan Cup: Champions
- UEFA Europa League: Second qualifying round vs Elfsborg
- UEFA Conference League: Third qualifying round vs Olimpija Ljubljana
- Top goalscorer: League: Rasheed Akanbi (7); All: Rasheed Akanbi (12)
- Highest home attendance: 8,257 vs Milsami Orhei (18 May 2025)
- Lowest home attendance: 670 vs Barsa Ungheni (2 March 2025)
- Average home league attendance: 2,998 (18 May 2025)
Home colours	Away colours

The 2024–25 season was FC Sheriff Tiraspol's 28th season, and their 27th in the Moldovan Super Liga, the top-flight of Moldovan football.

== Season events ==
On 10 June, Sheriff announced the signing of Jocelin Behiratche from Dinamo City. The next day, 11 June, Sheriff announced the signing of Ajak Riak from PSS Sleman.

On 17 June, Sheriff announced the signing of Matheus Lins from Austria Lustenau.

On 22 June, Sheriff announced the signing of Rashed Al-Tumi from Sliema Wanderers.

On 25 June, Sheriff announced the signing of Sid Ahmed Aissaoui on loan from CSKA Moscow until the end of the season.

On 27 June, Sheriff announced the return of Vadim Paireli, who'd previously played for the club between 2013 and 2021, from Milsami Orhei.

On 28 June, Sheriff announced the signing of Alesio Mija from Dinamo City.

On 1 July, Sheriff announced the signings of Pape Ndiaga Yade from Metz, and Stefan Despotovski from Rabotnički.

On 2 July, Sheriff announced the departure of Ricardinho after his contract expired.

On 4 July, Sheriff announced the signing of Ilounga Pata from TOP Oss, and the signing of Ayyoub Allach who'd previously played for Gabala.

On 11 July, Sheriff announced the signing of Nana Kwame Boakye from Ghana Premier League club Nations.

On 15 July, Sheriff announced the signing of Gideon Uche Goodlad from Israeli Premier League club Maccabi Petah Tikva.

On 19 July, Sheriff announced the signing of Roko Jureškin from Serie B club Pisa.

On 5 August, Head Coach Yuriy Hura left his position due to family circumstances, and was replaced by Mislav Karoglan.

On 9 August, Sheriff announced the signing of Cyrille Bayala from AC Ajaccio.

On 13 August, Sheriff announced the signing of Vladimer Mamuchashvili from Dinamo Batumi.

On 5 December, Sheriff announced that Vyacheslav Kozma had signed his first professional contract with the club.

On 4 January, Sheriff announced that Dumitru Celeadnic, Armel Zohouri, Tyler Reid, Cedric Badolo and Mihail Ghecev had all left the club and that Victor Străistari had returned from his loan deal with Dacia Buiucani.

On 14 January, Sheriff announced the loan signing of Artur Serobyan from Ararat-Armenia.

On 18 January, Sheriff announced the signing of Raí from Dinamo Minsk.

On 22 January, Sheriff announced the signing of Natus Jamel Swen from Mġarr United.

On 23 January, Sheriff announced the signing of Luis Phelipe who'd most recently played for FCSB.

On 24 January, Sheriff announced the signing of Emil Velić from NK Radomlje.

On 4 February, Sheriff announced the signing of Elijah Odede.

On 11 February, Sheriff announced that Peter Ademo had joined Rapid București on loan until the summer, with Rapid having the option to make the move permanent.

On 12 February, Sheriff announced the loan signing of Aleksa Marušić from 1. FC Magdeburg.

On 24 February, Sheriff announced that they had reached an agreement with Armel Zohouri and that he had re-joined the club.

On 27 February, Sheriff announced the signing of Johan Rodallega from Millonarios.

On 7 March, Sheriff announced the signing of Soumaïla Magossouba from Stade Malien.

On 15 April, Sheriff announced that Mislav Karoglan had left his role as Head Coach by mutual agreement, with Victor Mihailov being announced as Interim Head Coach.

== Squad ==
As of match played 24 May 2025

No.	Name	Nationality	Position	Date of birth (age)	Signed from	Signed in	Contract ends	Apps.	Goals
Goalkeepers
1	Victor Străistari	(Moldova)	GK	21 June 1999 (age 26)	Sfîntul Gheorghe	2023		13	0
16	Rashed Al-Tumi	(Malta)	GK	4 October 2000 (age 25)	Sliema Wanderers	2024		6	0
25	Roman Dumenco	(Moldova)	GK	30 July 2004 (age 21)	Academy	2024		0	0
28	Emil Velić	(Slovenia)	GK	6 February 1995 (age 31)	NK Radomlje	2024		5	0
Defenders
3	Nana Kwame Boakye	(Ghana)	DF	18 August 1997 (age 28)	Nations	2024		35	3
4	Natus Jamel Swen	(Liberia)	DF	18 November 2004 (age 21)	Mġarr United	2025		9	0
6	Raí	(Brazil)	DF	28 March 2000 (age 26)	Dinamo Minsk	2025		16	0
20	Armel Zohouri	(Ivory Coast)	DF	5 April 2001 (age 25)	Unattached	2025		79	2
26	Artiom Dijinari	(Moldova)	DF	26 October 2005 (age 20)	Academy	2022		4	0
29	Soumaïla Magossouba	(Mali)	DF	28 June 2004 (age 21)	Stade Malien	2025		14	0
33	Matheus Lins	(Brazil)	DF	24 March 2001 (age 25)	Austria Lustenau	2024		18	0
44	Alesio Mija	(Albania)	DF	20 June 2001 (age 24)	Dinamo City	2024		20	4
50	Jocelin Behiratche	(Ivory Coast)	DF	8 May 2000 (age 26)	Dinamo City	2024		22	1
Midfielders
8	João Paulo Fernandes	(Cape Verde)	MF	26 May 1998 (age 28)	Feirense	2023		59	6
17	Johan Rodallega	(Colombia)	MF	24 April 2005 (age 21)	Millonarios	2025		1	0
18	Moussa Kyabou	(Mali)	MF	18 April 1998 (age 28)	USC Kita	2021		99	0
24	Danila Forov	(Moldova)	MF	7 January 2004 (age 22)	HNK Rijeka	2023		15	4
36	Nichita Sandetchi	(Moldova)	MF	14 May 2005 (age 21)	Academy	2023		1	0
47	Gideon Uche Goodlad	(Nigeria)	MF	16 January 2005 (age 21)	Maccabi Petah Tikva	2024		7	0
71	Vladimer Mamuchashvili	(Georgia (country))	MF	29 August 1997 (age 28)	Dinamo Batumi	2024		23	8
Forwards
7	Abou Ouattara	(Burkina Faso)	FW	25 December 1999 (age 26)	Valenciennes	2022		32	4
9	Aleksa Marušić	(Montenegro)	FW	8 June 1999 (age 27)	on loan from 1. FC Magdeburg	2025	2025	14	7
10	Artur Serobyan	(Armenia)	FW	2 July 2003 (age 22)	on loan from Ararat-Armenia	2025	2025	15	2
11	Cyrille Bayala	(Burkina Faso)	FW	24 May 1996 (age 30)	AC Ajaccio	2024		63	13
12	Elijah Odede	(Nigeria)	FW	12 January 2007 (age 19)	Unattached	2025		12	2
27	Vyacheslav Kozma	(Moldova)	FW	3 February 2005 (age 21)	Academy	2024		5	1
31	Dan-Angelo Botan	(Moldova)	FW	19 February 2005 (age 21)	Academy	2023		6	0
42	Konan Jaures-Ulrich Loukou	(Ivory Coast)	FW	15 June 2005 (age 20)	Issia Wazy	2023		12	0
61	Rasheed Akanbi	(Nigeria)	FW	9 May 1999 (age 27)	Kocaelispor	2022		83	31
70	Luis Phelipe	(Brazil)	FW	12 February 2001 (age 25)	Unattached	2025		8	1
90	Pape Ndiaga Yade	(Mauritania)	FW	5 January 2000 (age 26)	Metz	2024		32	9
Out on loan
69	Peter Ademo	(Nigeria)	MF	11 January 2003 (age 23)	DFK Dainava	2024		35	5
	Danila Ignatov	(Moldova)	DF	19 June 2001 (age 24)	Academy	2020		4	1
	Roman Novicov	(Moldova)	MF	23 April 2003 (age 23)	Academy	2023		1	0
Left during the season
2	Adamou Djibo	(Niger)	DF	13 August 1998 (age 27)	ASN Nigelec	2023		5	0
4	Bernardo Vilar	(Brazil)	DF	12 February 1998 (age 28)	on loan from IFK Värnamo	2024		10	2
9	Ajak Riak	(South Sudan)	FW	12 December 2000 (age 25)	PSS Sleman	2024		12	2
10	Cedric Badolo	(Burkina Faso)	MF	4 November 1998 (age 27)	Pohronie	2023		105	18
17	Jerome Ngom Mbekeli	(Cameroon)	FW	30 September 1998 (age 27)	Beveren	2023		42	6
21	Cedric Ngah	(Cameroon)	DF	17 October 1998 (age 27)	Sfîntul Gheorghe	2023		6	0
22	Tyler Reid	(England)	DF	24 January 2004 (age 22)	VPS	2024		8	0
23	Cristian Tovar	(Colombia)	DF	21 June 1999 (age 26)	Deportivo Pasto	2023		35	3
27	Mateo Ortíz	(Ecuador)	MF	31 January 2000 (age 26)	on loan from Independiente del Valle	2024		6	0
31	Sid Ahmed Aissaoui	(Algeria)	MF	11 January 2005 (age 21)	on loan from CSKA Moscow	2024	2025	0	0
34	Dumitru Celeadnic	(Moldova)	GK	23 April 1992 (age 34)	Politehnica Iași	2023		83	0
45	Ayyoub Allach	(Morocco)	MF	28 January 1998 (age 28)	Unattached	2024		17	5
46	Stefan Despotovski	(North Macedonia)	DF	23 January 2003 (age 23)	Rabotnički	2024		8	0
55	Maicol Ferreira	(Uruguay)	MF	24 January 2004 (age 22)	Fénix	2024		7	1
66	Ilounga Pata	(Sint Maarten)	DF	12 November 2000 (age 25)	TOP Oss	2024		9	0
77	Mihail Ghecev	(Moldova)	FW	5 November 1997 (age 28)	Mynai	2024		24	6
91	Roko Jureškin	(Croatia)	DF	29 September 2000 (age 25)	Pisa	2024		7	0
95	Vadim Paireli	(Moldova)	MF	8 November 1995 (age 30)	Milsami Orhei	2024		74	6

== Transfers ==
=== In ===
Date	Position	Nationality	Name	From	Fee	Ref.
10 June 2024	DF	(Ivory Coast)	Jocelin Behiratche	Dinamo City	Undisclosed	
11 June 2024	FW	(South Sudan)	Ajak Riak	PSS Sleman	Undisclosed	
17 June 2024	DF	(Brazil)	Matheus Lins	Austria Lustenau	Undisclosed	
22 June 2024	GK	(Malta)	Rashed Al-Tumi	Sliema Wanderers	Undisclosed	
27 June 2024	MF	(Moldova)	Vadim Paireli	Milsami Orhei	Undisclosed	
28 June 2024	DF	(Ivory Coast)	Alesio Mija	Dinamo City	Undisclosed	
1 July 2024	MF	(Mauritania)	Pape Ndiaga Yade	Metz	Undisclosed	
1 July 2024	DF	(North Macedonia)	Stefan Despotovski	Rabotnički	Undisclosed	
4 July 2024	DF	(Sint Maarten)	Ilounga Pata	TOP Oss	Undisclosed	
4 July 2024	MF	(Morocco)	Ayyoub Allach	Unattached	Free	
11 July 2024	DF	(Ghana)	Nana Kwame Boakye	Nations	Undisclosed	
15 July 2024	MF	(Nigeria)	Gideon Uche Goodlad	Maccabi Petah Tikva	Undisclosed	
19 July 2024	DF	(Croatia)	Roko Jureškin	Pisa	Undisclosed	
9 August 2024	FW	(Burkina Faso)	Cyrille Bayala	AC Ajaccio	Free	
13 August 2024	MF	(Georgia (country))	Vladimer Mamuchashvili	Dinamo Batumi	Undisclosed	
18 January 2025	DF	(Brazil)	Raí	Dinamo Minsk	Undisclosed	
22 January 2025	DF	(Liberia)	Natus Jamel Swen	Mġarr United	Undisclosed	
23 January 2025	FW	(Brazil)	Luis Phelipe	Unattached	Free	
24 January 2025	GK	(Slovenia)	Emil Velić	NK Radomlje	Undisclosed	
4 February 2025	FW	(Nigeria)	Elijah Odede			
7 March 2025	DF	(Mali)	Soumaïla Magossouba	Stade Malien	Undisclosed	

=== Loans in ===
Date from	Position	Nationality	Name	From	Date to	Ref.
22 January 2024	MF	(Ecuador)	Mateo Ortíz	Independiente del Valle	24 July 2024	
25 January 2024	DF	(Brazil)	Bernardo Vilar	IFK Värnamo	18 July 2024	
27 February 2025	MF	(Colombia)	Johan Rodallega	Millonarios	Undisclosed	
25 June 2024	MF	(Algeria)	Sid Ahmed Aissaoui	CSKA Moscow	End of season	
14 January 2025	FW	(Armenia)	Artur Serobyan	Ararat-Armenia	31 December 2025	
12 February 2025	FW	(Montenegro)	Aleksa Marušić	1. FC Magdeburg	30 June 2025	

=== Out ===
Date	Position	Nationality	Name	To	Fee	Ref.
4 July 2024	DF	(Brazil)	Rodrigo Freitas	Mafra	Undisclosed	
13 July 2024	DF	(Cameroon)	Cedric Ngah	Zimbru Chișinău	Undisclosed	
12 January 2025	DF	(Colombia)	Cristian Tovar	América de Cali	Undisclosed	
29 January 2025	DF	(Sint Maarten)	Ilounga Pata	Mafra	Undisclosed	
6 February 2025	MF	(Morocco)	Ayyoub Allach	Araz-Naxçıvan	Undisclosed	
19 February 2025	MF	(Moldova)	Vadim Paireli	Ulytau	Undisclosed	
21 February 2025	FW	(South Sudan)	Ajak Riak	AGMK	Undisclosed	

=== Loans out ===
Date from	Position	Nationality	Name	To	Date to	Ref.
3 July 2024	DF	(Colombia)	Cristian Tovar	Ordabasy	31 December 2024	
1 August 2024	GK	(Moldova)	Victor Străistari	Dacia Buiucani	4 January 2025	
11 February 2025	MF	(Nigeria)	Peter Ademo	Rapid București	30 June 2025	

=== Released ===
Date	Position	Nationality	Name	Joined	Date	Ref.
13 June 2024	GK	(Moldova)	Serghei Pașcenco	Retired		
30 June 2024	DF	(Colombia)	Alejandro Artunduaga	Chania	16 September 2024	
30 June 2024	DF	(Greece)	Konstantinos Apostolakis	AEL		
30 June 2024	MF	(Brazil)	Ramon Vinicius	Ankara Keçiörengücü		
30 June 2024	MF	(Niger)	Abdoul Moumouni	Mesaimeer	16 August 2024	
30 June 2024	FW	(Colombia)	Wilinton Aponzá	Torpedo Moscow	1 July 2024	
30 June 2024	FW	(England)	Thierry Nevers	NK Varaždin	17 July 2024	
2 July 2024	FW	(Brazil)	Ricardinho	Rio Branco-ES		
13 September 2024	DF	(Croatia)	Roko Jureškin	Spartak Trnava	13 September 2024	
31 December 2024	DF	(Niger)	Adamou Djibo	US GN	1 February 2025	
31 December 2024	DF	(North Macedonia)	Stefan Despotovski	OFK Beograd	31 January 2025	
31 December 2024	MF	(Uruguay)	Maicol Ferreira	Colón	6 March 2025	
31 December 2024	FW	(Cameroon)	Jerome Ngom Mbekeli	Meizhou Hakka		
4 January 2025	GK	(Moldova)	Dumitru Celeadnic	Ordabasy	19 January 2025	
4 January 2025	DF	(England)	Tyler Reid	VPS	5 March 2025	
4 January 2025	DF	(Ivory Coast)	Armel Zohouri	Re-signed	24 February 2025	
4 January 2025	MF	(Burkina Faso)	Cedric Badolo	Spartak Trnava	28 January 2025	
4 January 2025	FW	(Moldova)	Mihail Ghecev			

== Friendlies ==
22 June 2024	Sheriff Tiraspol	0–0	Milsami Orhei
EEST (UTC+3)		Report

26 June 2024	Sheriff Tiraspol	1–1	Petrocub Hîncești
EEST (UTC+3)	Goal	Report	Riak (penalty missed); Fernandes (pen.)

30 June 2024	Sheriff Tiraspol	1–0	Zimbru Chișinău
EEST (UTC+3)	Riak	Report

3 July 2024	Sheriff Tiraspol	5–0	Florești
EEST (UTC+3)	Yade; Akanbi; Ademo; Badolo; Trialist	Report

12 October 2024	Sheriff Tiraspol	0–1	Politehnica Iași	Tiraspol
EET (UTC+2)		Report		Stadium: Malaya Sportivnaya Arena

26 January 2025	Sheriff Tiraspol	5–0	Milsami Orhei	Tiraspol
EET (UTC+2)	Serobyan; Yade; Phelipe; Mamuchashvili; Trialist	Report		Stadium: Malaya Sportivnaya Arena

29 January 2025	Sheriff Tiraspol	1–3	Petrocub Hîncești	Tiraspol
EET (UTC+2)	Trialist	Report	Goal	Stadium: Malaya Sportivnaya Arena

2 February 2025	Sheriff Tiraspol	1–0	Bălți	Tiraspol
EET (UTC+2)	Phelipe	Report		Stadium: Malaya Sportivnaya Arena

8 February 2025	Sheriff Tiraspol	3–2	CSM Reșița	Belek, Turkey
EET (UTC+2)	Yade; Bayala; Raí	Report	Goal

15 February 2025	Sheriff Tiraspol	0–1	Livyi Bereh Kyiv	Belek, Turkey
EET (UTC+2)		Report

20 February 2025	Sheriff Tiraspol	2–0	Lokomotiv Tashkent	Belek, Turkey
EET (UTC+2)	Marušić; Serobyan	Report

22 March 2025	Sheriff Tiraspol	2–1	Botoșani	Tiraspol
15:00 EET (UTC+2)	Odede; Akanbi	Report	Goal	Stadium: Malaya Sportivnaya Arena

== Competitions ==
=== Overall record ===
Competition	First match	Last match	Starting round	Final position	Record							
Competition	First match	Last match	Starting round	Final position	Pld	W	D	L	GF	GA	GD	Win %
National Division	4 August 2024	18 May 2025	Matchday 1	Runnersup	24	16	8	0	50	12	+38	66.67
Moldovan Cup	2 March 2025	24 May 2025	Round of 16	Winners	6	6	0	0	19	3	+16	100.00
UEFA Europa League	11 July 2024	1 August 2024	First qualifying round	Second qualifying round	4	1	0	3	2	5	−3	25.00
UEFA Conference League	8 August 2024	15 August 2024	Third qualifying round	Third qualifying round	2	0	0	2	0	4	−4	0.00
Total					36	23	8	5	71	24	+47	63.89

Last updated: 24 May 2025
Source: Competitions

=== Super Liga ===
==== Phase I ====
===== League table =====
Pos	Team	Pld	W	D	L	GF	GA	GD	Pts	Qualification or relegation
1	Sheriff Tiraspol	14	11	3	0	33	6	+27	36	Qualification to Phase II
2	Zimbru Chișinău	14	8	1	5	32	16	+16	25	Qualification to Phase II
3	Petrocub Hîncești	14	6	5	3	20	9	+11	23 (Note: Goal difference: Petrocub : +11, Bălți : +9.)	Qualification to Phase II
4	Bălți	14	6	5	3	18	9	+9	23	Qualification to Phase II
5	Milsami Orhei	14	6	3	5	30	18	+12	21	Qualification to Phase II

Source: FMF, UEFA, Soccerway
Rules for classification: 1) Points; 2) Head-to-head points; 3) Head-to-head goal difference; 4) Head-to-head goals scored; 5) Matches won; 6) Goal difference; 7) Goals scored; 8) Least red cards; 9) Least yellow cards.

===== Results summary =====
Overall								Home						Away					
Pld	W	D	L	GF	GA	GD	Pts	W	D	L	GF	GA	GD	W	D	L	GF	GA	GD
14	11	3	0	33	6	+27	36	6	1	0	18	3	+15	5	2	0	15	3	+12

Last updated: 23 November 2024.
Source: FMF

===== Results =====
4 August 2024 1	Sheriff Tiraspol	2–0	Dacia Buiucani	Tiraspol
18:00 EEST (UTC+3)	Ademo 15', 77' (yellow card) 74'	Report	Lupascu (yellow card) 62'	Stadium: Sheriff Arena; Attendance: 1,320; Referee: Denis Ivlev

11 August 2024 2	Sheriff Tiraspol	1–0	Spartanii Sportul	Tiraspol
18:00 EEST (UTC+3)	Allach 42'	Report	Dedov (yellow card) 78'	Stadium: Sheriff Arena; Attendance: 800; Referee: Ion Bîlea

18 August 2024 3	Sheriff Tiraspol	1–0	Petrocub Hîncești	Tiraspol
20:00 EEST (UTC+3)	Mija (yellow card) 17' (goal) 72'; Yade (yellow card) 23'; Badolo (yellow card) 89'	Report	Jardan (yellow card) 24'; Djangbah (yellow card) 59'	Stadium: Sheriff Arena; Attendance: 1,113; Referee: Ion Orlic

25 August 2024 4	Zimbru Chișinău	1–2	Sheriff Tiraspol	Chișinău
20:00 EEST (UTC+3)	Ohajunwa 4'; Dedechko (yellow card) 65'	Report	Mija 13'; Ademo 15'; Despotovski (yellow card) 49'	Stadium: Zimbru Stadium; Attendance: 1,130; Referee: Igor Boșca

31 August 2024 5	Sheriff Tiraspol	1–1	Milsami Orhei	Tiraspol
19:00 EEST (UTC+3)	Yade (yellow card) 45'; Riak 67'; Badolo (yellow card) 70'	Report	Gînsari 35'	Stadium: Sheriff Arena; Attendance: 2,013; Referee: Andrei Cojocaru

15 September 2024 6	Florești	0–4	Sheriff Tiraspol	Bender
16:00 EEST (UTC+3)	Covcenco (yellow card) 68'; Bondarenco (yellow card) 90+2'	Report	Yade 9'; Allach 32'; Akanbi 35'; Ouattara 76'	Stadium: Stadionul Dinamo; Attendance: 250; Referee: Stanislav Leu

21 September 2024 7	Sheriff Tiraspol	1–0	Bălți	Tiraspol
19:00 EEST (UTC+3)	Yade 47'; Zohouri (yellow card) 82'	Report	Urvanțev (yellow card) 44'; Yakovlev (yellow card) 79'	Stadium: Sheriff Arena; Attendance: 3,250; Referee: Denis Ivlev

29 September 2024 8	Dacia Buiucani	1–3	Sheriff Tiraspol	Chișinău
15:00 EEST (UTC+3)	Gorea 43'; Moraru (yellow card) 49'; Josan (yellow card) 76'	Report	Mamuchashvili 18', 26', 54'; Yade (yellow card) 29'; Ouattara (yellow card) 34'; Mija (yellow card) 66'	Stadium: Zimbru-2 Stadium; Attendance: 352; Referee: Viktor Bugenko

5 October 2024 9	Spartanii Sportul	0–1	Sheriff Tiraspol	Nisporeni
18:00 EEST (UTC+3)	Bonsu (yellow card) 10'; Olaniyan (yellow card) 81'; Owusu (yellow card) 90+2'	Report	Boakye (yellow card) 32'; Mbekeli (yellow card) 72'; Allach 90+1'	Stadium: Nisporeni Central Stadium; Attendance: 550; Referee: Roman Jitari

19 October 2024 10	Petrocub Hîncești	1–1	Sheriff Tiraspol	Hîncești
18:00 EEST (UTC+3)	Șmalenea (yellow card) 53'; S.Plătică (yellow card) 60'; Căruntu 79'; Jardan (yellow card) 85'	Report	Mamuchashvili (yellow card) 7'; Badolo 41' (pen.); Mbekeli (yellow card) 90'	Stadium: Stadionul Municipal; Attendance: 1,187; Referee: Andrei Cojocaru

27 October 2024 11	Sheriff Tiraspol	4–2	Zimbru Chișinău	Tiraspol
17:00 EET (UTC+2)	Boakye 19'; Bayala 35' (pen.); Zohouri (yellow card) 45+1'; Mamuchashvili 45+2'; Lins (yellow card) 48'; Kyabou (yellow card) 50'; Badolo 74'	Report	John Paulino (yellow card) 25' (goal) 42'; Ohajunwa (yellow card) 36'; Răileanu (yellow card) 45+1'; Bîtca 76'; Alaribe (yellow card) 82'	Stadium: Sheriff Arena; Attendance: 5,820; Referee: Daniel Luca

2 November 2024 12	Milsami Orhei	0–4	Sheriff Tiraspol	Orhei
16:00 EET (UTC+2)	Lupano (yellow card) 29'; Milić (yellow card) 32'; Cioban (red card) 43'	Report	Mamuchashvili 38'; Lins (yellow card) 54'; Mija 65'; Bayala 74'; Zohouri 89'; Ademo (yellow card) 90+2'	Stadium: CSR Orhei; Attendance: 1,448; Referee: Andrei Cojocaru

9 November 2024 13	Sheriff Tiraspol	8–0	Florești	Tiraspol
15:00 EET (UTC+2)	Ouattara 4'; Akanbi 12', 36', 88'; Pata (yellow card) 42'; Kozma 51'; Forov 82'; Riak 87'; Allach 90+1'	Report	Voropai (yellow card) 42'	Stadium: Sheriff Arena; Attendance: 1,500; Referee: Ivan Tudos

23 November 2024 14	Bălți	0–0	Sheriff Tiraspol	Bălți
13:00 EET (UTC+2)	Cesar (yellow card) 76'	Report	Behiratche (yellow card) 49'; Kozma (yellow card) 86'	Stadium: Stadionul Orășenesc; Attendance: 1,240; Referee: Ion Orlic

==== Phase II ====
===== League table =====
Pos	Team	Pld	W	D	L	GF	GA	GD	Pts	Qualification
1	Milsami Orhei (C)	10	6	3	1	25	8	+17	21	Qualification for the Champions League first qualifying round
2	Sheriff Tiraspol	10	5	5	0	17	6	+11	20 (Note: Head-to-head points: Sheriff : 8, Zimbru : 2.)	Qualification for the Europa League first qualifying round (Note: Sheriff Tiraspol qualified for the Europa League first qualifying round as the 2024–25 Moldovan Cup winners.)
3	Zimbru Chișinău	10	6	2	2	22	9	+13	20	Qualification for the Conference League second qualifying round
4	Petrocub Hîncești	10	4	2	4	20	17	+3	14	Qualification for the Conference League first qualifying round
5	Bălți	10	1	2	7	9	24	−15	5	

Source: FMF, UEFA, Soccerway
Rules for classification: 1) Points; 2) Play-off (only if deciding champion when two teams tied); 3) Head-to-head points; 4) Head-to-head goal difference; 5) Head-to-head goals scored; 6) Matches won; 7) Goal difference; 8) Goals scored; 9) Least red cards; 10) Least yellow cards.
(C) Champions

===== Results summary =====
Overall								Home						Away					
Pld	W	D	L	GF	GA	GD	Pts	W	D	L	GF	GA	GD	W	D	L	GF	GA	GD
10	5	5	0	17	6	+11	20	4	3	0	14	4	+10	1	2	0	3	2	+1

Last updated: 18 May 2025.
Source: FMF

===== Results =====
9 March 2025 1	Sheriff Tiraspol	3–0	Spartanii Sportul	Tiraspol
15:00 EET (UTC+2)	Mamuchashvili 13'; Kyabou (yellow card) 39'; Behiratche (yellow card) 64'; Marušić 69'; Akanbi 90+4'	Report	Morozan (yellow card) 34'; Harb (yellow card) 45+2'; Olaniyan (yellow card) 54'	Stadium: Sheriff Arena; Attendance: 860; Referee: Igor Boșca

15 March 2025 2	Sheriff Tiraspol	0–0	Zimbru Chișinău	Tiraspol
17:00 EET (UTC+2)	Zohouri (yellow card) 17'	Report	Gayá (yellow card) 15'; Soumah (yellow card) 45'; Paz (yellow card) 63'; Rodrigues (yellow card) 90+2'	Stadium: Sheriff Arena; Attendance: 7,023; Referee: Denis Ivlev

29 March 2025 3	Petrocub Hîncești	1–1	Sheriff Tiraspol	Hîncești
18:00 EET (UTC+2)	Lungu (yellow card) 59'; Popescu 79'; Borș (yellow card) 86'	Report	Serobyan 76'	Stadium: Stadionul Municipal; Attendance: 806; Referee: Luca Daniel

5 April 2025 4	Sheriff Tiraspol	2–1	Bălți	Tiraspol
18:00 EEST (UTC+3)	Boakye 10'; Bayala (yellow card) 38'; Raí (yellow card) 52'; Marušić 88' (yellow card) 88'; Akanbi (yellow card) 90+7'	Report	Andrézinho (yellow card) 32'; Ferreira 39'; Cesar (yellow card) 42'; Picus (yellow card) 45' (yellow-red card) 90+5'; Nazarciuc (yellow card) 84'; Rusnac (yellow card) 89'	Stadium: Sheriff Arena; Attendance: 2,312; Referee: Roman Jitari

13 April 2025 5	Sheriff Tiraspol	2–2	Milsami Orhei	Tiraspol
18:00 EEST (UTC+3)	Marušić 38'; Zohouri (yellow card) 51'; Yade 71'; Raí (yellow card) 90+5'	Report	Gînsari (yellow card) 51' (goal) 90+5'; Nwaeze (yellow card) 64'; Ndon 90+1'	Stadium: Sheriff Arena; Attendance: 4,119; Referee: Andrei Cojocaru

19 April 2025 6	Sheriff Tiraspol	4–0	Spartanii Sportul	Tiraspol
15:00 EEST (UTC+3)	Marušić 21'; Serobyan (yellow card) 41'; Akanbi 60', 77'; Forov 83'	Report	Toto (yellow card) 67'	Stadium: Sheriff Arena; Attendance: 1,254; Referee: Ivan Tudos

26 April 2025 7	Zimbru Chișinău	1–1	Sheriff Tiraspol	Chișinău
20:00 EEST (UTC+3)	Bîtca 44'; Katty 45+15'; Mulélé 86'	Report	Yade 18'; Magossouba (yellow card) 45+12'; Serobyan (yellow card) 76'; Bayala (yellow card) 90+2'	Stadium: Zimbru Stadium; Attendance: 1,730; Referee: Igor Boșca

4 May 2025 8	Sheriff Tiraspol	3–1	Petrocub Hîncești	Tiraspol
20:00 EEST (UTC+3)	Boakye 13'; Yade 15'; Akanbi (yellow card) 51'; Potîrniche 85' (o.g.); Kyabou (yellow card) 90'	Report	Lupan 24'; Căruntu (yellow card) 35'; Ngah (yellow card) 55'	Stadium: Sheriff Arena; Attendance: 2,334; Referee: Denis Ivlev

10 May 2025 9	Bălți	0–1	Sheriff Tiraspol	Bălți
20:00 EEST (UTC+3)	Bely (yellow card) 32'; Nazarciuc (yellow card) 85'; Sosnovschi (yellow card) 90+4'	Report	Serobyan (yellow card) 55'; Yade 89'; Loukou (yellow card) 90+2'	Stadium: Bălți Stadium; Attendance: 1,500; Referee: Roman Jitari

18 May 2025 10	Sheriff Tiraspol	0–0	Milsami Orhei	Tiraspol
20:00 EEST (UTC+3)	Akanbi (yellow card) 71'; Marušić (yellow card) 90+5'	Report	Nwaeze (yellow card) 78' (red card) 90+3'; Antoniuc (yellow card) 88'; Tîmbur (yellow card) 90+3'	Stadium: Sheriff Arena; Attendance: 8,257; Referee: Igor Boșca

=== Moldovan Cup ===
2 March 2025 Round of 16	Sheriff Tiraspol	9–0	Barsa Ungheni	Tiraspol
15:00 EET (UTC+2)	Akanbi 3', 51', 71', 79'; Odede 10', 86'; Yade 47'; Mamuchashvili 55' (pen.); Mija 67'; Zohouri (yellow card) 78'	Report	Miron (yellow card) 54'	Stadium: Sheriff Arena; Attendance: 670; Referee: Denis Ivlev

2 April 2025 Quarter-final 1st leg	Sheriff Tiraspol	4–1	Bălți	Tiraspol
18:00 EEST (UTC+3)	Phelipe 3'; Marušić 13', 67'; Mamuchashvili 29'	Report	Bely (yellow card) 66'; Boico 74'	Stadium: Sheriff Arena; Attendance: 1,650; Referee: Igor Boshka

16 April 2025 Quarter-final 2nd leg	Bălți	0–1 (1–5 agg.)	Sheriff Tiraspol	Bălți
18:00 EEST (UTC+3)	Andrézinho (yellow card) 47'	Report	Bayala (yellow card) 41'; Marušić 55'	Stadium: Bălți Stadium; Attendance: 1,347; Referee: Ion Orlic

30 April 2025 Semi-final 1st leg	Zimbru Chișinău	1–2	Sheriff Tiraspol	Chișinău
19:00 EEST (UTC+3)	Soumah (yellow card) 18'; Gayá (yellow card) 45+1'; Ebikabowei 84'	Report	Akanbi 5'; Serobyan 22'; Zohouri (yellow card) 39'; Străistari (yellow card) 60'; Boakye (yellow card) 81'	Stadium: Zimbru Stadium; Attendance: 2,315; Referee: Roman Jitari

14 May 2025 Semi-final 2nd leg	Sheriff Tiraspol	1–0 (3–1 agg.)	Zimbru Chișinău	Tiraspol
19:00 EEST (UTC+3)	Yade 46'; Kyabou (yellow card) 90+5'	Report	Bîtca (yellow card) 53'; Soumah (yellow card) 57'; Ștefan (yellow card) 90+1'	Stadium: Sheriff Arena; Attendance: 2,947; Referee: Andrei Bregutse

24 May 2025 Final	Milsami Orhei	1–2	Sheriff Tiraspol	Tiraspol
19:00 EEST (UTC+3)	Asmelash (yellow card) 16'; Jardan (yellow card) 31'; Gînsari (yellow card) 82'; Kabamba Kalabatama (yellow card) 83'; Gopey 90'; Tîmbur (yellow card) 90+2' (red card) 90+5'; Nwaeze (yellow card) 90+5'; Yoda (red card) 90+5'	Report	Serobyan (yellow card) 22'; Akanbi 85', 90+1'; Phelipe (yellow card) 90+5'	Stadium: Sheriff Arena; Attendance: 8,953; Referee: Denis Ivlev

=== UEFA Europa League ===
==== Qualifying rounds ====
11 July 2024 First qualifying round 1st leg	Sheriff Tiraspol (Moldova)	0–1	(Azerbaijan) Zira	Tiraspol, Moldova
20:00 EEST (UTC+3)		Report	Zebli (yellow card) 31'; Acka (yellow card) 40'; Volkovi 88'	Stadium: Sheriff Arena; Attendance: 3,594; Referee: Alessandro Dudic (Switzerland)

18 July 2024 First qualifying round 2nd leg	Zira (Azerbaijan)	1–2 (a.e.t.) (2–2 agg.) (4–5 p)	(Moldova) Sheriff Tiraspol	Baku, Azerbaijan
20:00 EEST (UTC+3)	Utzig 5'; Soumah (red card) 40'; Akhmedzade (yellow card) 100'	Report	Pata (yellow card) 2'; Ademo (yellow card) 31'; Allach 54'; Yade 77'; Mija (yellow card) 90+2'	Stadium: Dalga Arena; Attendance: 4,700; Referee: Bulat Sariyev (Kazakhstan)
	Penalties
	Alıyev (penalty scored); Ruan Renato (penalty scored); Nuriyev (penalty scored); Ibrahimli (penalty scored); F. Bayramov (penalty missed)		(penalty scored) Badolo; (penalty scored) Akanbi; (penalty scored) Pata; (penalty scored) João Paulo; (penalty scored) Allach
Note: Zira played their home match at the Dalga Arena in Baku, instead of their regular stadium, the Zira Olympic Sport Complex Stadium, in Zirə, which did not meet UEFA requirements.

25 July 2024 Second qualifying round 1st leg	Sheriff Tiraspol (Moldova)	0–1	(Sweden) Elfsborg	Tiraspol, Moldova
20:00 EEST (UTC+3)	Ademo (yellow card) 38'; Mija (yellow card) 73'; Badolo (yellow card) 85'	Report	Hult (yellow card) 69'; Hedlund 86' (pen.) (yellow card) 90+3'	Stadium: Sheriff Arena; Attendance: 3,751; Referee: Marek Radina (Czech Republic)

1 August 2024 Second qualifying round 2nd leg	Elfsborg (Sweden)	2–0 (3–0 agg.)	(Moldova) Sheriff Tiraspol	Borås, Sweden
20:00 EEST (UTC+3)	Abdullai 2'; Henriksson (yellow card) 36'; Ouma (yellow card) 49'; Pettersson (yellow card) 57'; Baidoo 73'; B.Zeneli (yellow card) 86'	Report	Mija (yellow card) 17'	Stadium: Borås Arena; Attendance: 5,414; Referee: Luis Godinho (Portugal)

=== UEFA Conference League ===
==== Qualifying rounds ====
8 August 2024 Third qualifying round 1st leg	Olimpija Ljubljana (Slovenia)	3–0	(Moldova) Sheriff Tiraspol	Ljubljana, Slovenia
20:00 EEST (UTC+3)	Muhamedbegović (yellow card) 14'; Pedro Lucas 45+4'; Doffo 65'; Sualehe 84'	Report	Lins (yellow card) 45+2'	Stadium: Stožice Stadium; Attendance: 3,797; Referee: Vasilios Fotias (Greece)

15 August 2024 Second qualifying round 2nd leg	Sheriff Tiraspol (Moldova)	0–1 (0–4 agg.)	(Slovenia) Olimpija Ljubljana	Tiraspol, Moldova
20:00 EEST (UTC+3)	Kyabou (yellow card) 43'; Mija (yellow card) 82'; Ademo (yellow card) 90+2'	Report	Motika 88' (pen.)	Stadium: Sheriff Arena; Attendance: 2,422; Referee: Maurizio Mariani (Italy)

== Squad statistics ==
As of match played 24 May 2025

=== Appearances and goals ===
No.	Pos	Nat	Player	Total		Super Liga		Moldovan Cup		Europa League		Conference League	
No.	Pos	Nat	Player	Apps	Goals	Apps	Goals	Apps	Goals	Apps	Goals	Apps	Goals
1	GK	(Moldova) MDA	Victor Străistari	11	0	5	0	6	0	0	0	0	0
3	DF	(Ghana) GHA	Nana Kwame Boakye	35	3	24	3	6	0	3	0	2	0
4	DF	(Liberia) LBR	Natus Jamel Swen	9	0	0+4	0	2+3	0	0	0	0	0
6	DF	(Brazil) BRA	Raí	16	0	10	0	6	0	0	0	0	0
7	FW	(Burkina Faso) BFA	Abou Ouattara	12	2	4+5	2	0	0	0+3	0	0	0
8	MF	(Cape Verde) CPV	João Paulo Fernandes	23	0	9+5	0	2+1	0	4	0	2	0
9	FW	(Montenegro) MNE	Aleksa Marušić	14	7	8+2	4	4	3	0	0	0	0
10	FW	(Armenia) ARM	Artur Serobyan	15	2	8+1	1	6	1	0	0	0	0
11	FW	(Burkina Faso) BFA	Cyrille Bayala	25	2	17+2	2	4+2	0	0	0	0	0
12	FW	(Nigeria) NGA	Elijah Odede	12	2	4+4	0	3+1	2	0	0	0	0
16	GK	(Malta) MLT	Rashed Al-Tumi	6	0	1	0	0	0	4	0	1	0
17	MF	(Colombia) COL	Johan Rodallega	1	0	0	0	0+1	0	0	0	0	0
18	MF	(Mali) MLI	Moussa Kyabou	26	0	17	0	3	0	4	0	2	0
20	DF	(Ivory Coast) CIV	Armel Zohouri	24	0	18	0	6	0	0	0	0	0
24	MF	(Moldova) MDA	Danila Forov	9	2	0+5	2	0+4	0	0	0	0	0
26	DF	(Moldova) MDA	Artiom Dijinari	3	0	0+2	0	1	0	0	0	0	0
27	FW	(Moldova) MDA	Vyacheslav Kozma	5	1	0+3	1	0+2	0	0	0	0	0
28	GK	(Slovenia) SVN	Emil Velić	5	0	5	0	0	0	0	0	0	0
29	DF	(Mali) MLI	Soumaïla Magossouba	14	0	8+1	0	5	0	0	0	0	0
33	DF	(Brazil) BRA	Matheus Lins	18	0	5+7	0	0+1	0	4	0	1	0
42	FW	(Ivory Coast) CIV	Konan Jaures-Ulrich Loukou	1	0	0+1	0	0	0	0	0	0	0
44	DF	(Albania) ALB	Alesio Mija	20	4	9+5	3	0+1	1	2+2	0	1	0
47	MF	(Nigeria) NGA	Gideon Uche Goodlad	7	0	1+5	0	0+1	0	0	0	0	0
50	DF	(Ivory Coast) CIV	Jocelin Behiratche	22	1	14+1	1	0+1	0	4	0	2	0
61	FW	(Nigeria) NGA	Rasheed Akanbi	32	14	10+10	7	5+1	7	1+3	0	1+1	0
70	FW	(Brazil) BRA	Luis Phelipe	8	1	3+2	0	2+1	1	0	0	0	0
71	MF	(Georgia (country)) GEO	Vladimer Mamuchashvili	23	8	18+1	6	3+1	2	0	0	0	0
90	FW	(Mauritania) MTN	Pape Ndiaga Yade	32	9	16+6	6	2+4	2	2	1	2	0
Players away on loan:
69	MF	(Nigeria) NGA	Peter Ademo	19	3	8+5	3	0	0	3+1	0	1+1	0
Players who left Sheriff Tiraspol during the season:
9	FW	(South Sudan) SSD	Ajak Riak	12	2	0+8	2	0	0	2+1	0	0+1	0
10	MF	(Burkina Faso) BFA	Cedric Badolo	18	2	11+1	2	0	0	4	0	1+1	0
17	FW	(Cameroon) CMR	Jerome Ngom Mbekeli	10	0	1+6	0	0	0	0+1	0	1+1	0
34	GK	(Moldova) MDA	Dumitru Celeadnic	15	0	13	0	0	0	0+1	0	1	0
45	MF	(Morocco) MAR	Ayyoub Allach	17	5	5+6	4	0	0	3+1	1	0+2	0
46	DF	(North Macedonia) MKD	Stefan Despotovski	8	0	6	0	0	0	0+1	0	1	0
66	DF	(Sint Maarten) SMA	Ilounga Pata	9	0	3+1	0	0	0	4	0	1	0
91	DF	(Croatia) CRO	Roko Jureškin	7	0	2+2	0	0	0	0+1	0	2	0
95	MF	(Moldova) MDA	Vadim Paireli	5	0	1+3	0	0	0	0+1	0	0	0

=== Goal scorers ===
Place	Position	Nation	Number	Name	Super Liga	Moldovan Cup	Europa League	Conference League	Total
1	FW	(Nigeria)	61	Rasheed Akanbi	7	7	0	0	14
2	FW	(Mauritania)	90	Pape Ndiaga Yade	6	2	1	0	9
3	MF	(Georgia (country))	71	Vladimer Mamuchashvili	6	2	0	0	8
4	FW	(Montenegro)	9	Aleksa Marušić	4	3	0	0	7
5	MF	(Morocco)	45	Ayyoub Allach	4	0	1	0	5
6	DF	(Albania)	44	Alesio Mija	3	1	0	0	4
7	MF	(Nigeria)	69	Peter Ademo	3	0	0	0	3
7	DF	(Ghana)	3	Nana Kwame Boakye	3	0	0	0	3
9	MF	(Burkina Faso)	10	Cedric Badolo	2	0	0	0	2
9	FW	(Burkina Faso)	11	Cyrille Bayala	2	0	0	0	2
9	FW	(Burkina Faso)	7	Abou Ouattara	2	0	0	0	2
9	FW	(South Sudan)	9	Ajak Riak	2	0	0	0	2
9	MF	(Moldova)	24	Danila Forov	2	0	0	0	2
9	FW	(Armenia)	10	Artur Serobyan	1	1	0	0	2
9	FW	(Nigeria)	12	Elijah Odede	0	2	0	0	2
16	DF	(Ivory Coast)	50	Jocelin Behiratche	1	0	0	0	1
16	FW	(Moldova)	27	Vyacheslav Kozma	1	0	0	0	1
16	FW	(Brazil)	70	Luis Phelipe	0	1	0	0	1
16				Own goal	1	0	0	0	1
				TOTALS	46	19	2	0	67

=== Clean sheets ===
Place	Position	Nation	Number	Name	Super Liga	Moldovan Cup	Europa League	Conference League	Total
1	GK	(Moldova)	34	Dumitru Celeadnic	8	0	0	0	8
2	GK	(Moldova)	1	Victor Străistari	3	3	0	0	6
3	GK	(Slovenia)	28	Emil Velić	2	0	0	0	2
4	GK	(Malta)	16	Rashed Al-Tumi	1	0	0	0	1
				TOTALS	14	3	0	0	17

=== Disciplinary record ===
Number	Nation	Position	Name	Super Liga		Moldovan Cup		Europa League		Conference League		Total	
Number	Nation	Position	Name	Booked	Sent off (straight red)	Booked	Sent off (straight red)	Booked	Sent off (straight red)	Booked	Sent off (straight red)	Booked	Sent off (straight red)
1	(Moldova)	GK	Victor Străistari	0	0	1	0	0	0	0	0	1	0
3	(Ghana)	DF	Nana Kwame Boakye	1	0	1	0	0	0	0	0	2	0
6	(Brazil)	DF	Raí	2	0	0	0	0	0	0	0	2	0
7	(Burkina Faso)	FW	Abou Ouattara	1	0	0	0	0	0	0	0	1	0
9	(Montenegro)	FW	Aleksa Marušić	2	0	0	0	0	0	0	0	2	0
10	(Armenia)	FW	Artur Serobyan	3	0	1	0	0	0	0	0	4	0
11	(Burkina Faso)	FW	Cyrille Bayala	2	0	1	0	0	0	0	0	3	0
18	(Mali)	MF	Moussa Kyabou	3	0	1	0	0	0	1	0	5	0
20	(Ivory Coast)	DF	Armel Zohouri	4	0	2	0	0	0	0	0	6	0
27	(Moldova)	FW	Vyacheslav Kozma	1	0	0	0	0	0	0	0	1	0
29	(Mali)	DF	Soumaïla Magossouba	1	0	0	0	0	0	0	0	1	0
33	(Brazil)	DF	Matheus Lins	2	0	0	0	0	0	1	0	3	0
42	(Ivory Coast)	FW	Konan Jaures-Ulrich Loukou	1	0	0	0	0	0	0	0	1	0
44	(Albania)	DF	Alesio Mija	2	0	0	0	3	0	1	0	6	0
50	(Ivory Coast)	DF	Jocelin Behiratche	2	0	0	0	0	0	0	0	2	0
61	(Nigeria)	FW	Rasheed Akanbi	3	0	0	0	0	0	0	0	3	0
70	(Brazil)	FW	Luis Phelipe	0	0	1	0	0	0	0	0	1	0
71	(Georgia (country))	MF	Vladimer Mamuchashvili	1	0	0	0	0	0	0	0	1	0
90	(Mauritania)	FW	Pape Ndiaga Yade	3	0	0	0	0	0	0	0	3	0
Players away on loan:
69	(Nigeria)	MF	Peter Ademo	2	0	0	0	2	0	1	0	5	0
Players who left Sheriff Tiraspol during the season:
10	(Burkina Faso)	MF	Cedric Badolo	2	0	0	0	1	0	0	0	3	0
17	(Cameroon)	FW	Jerome Ngom Mbekeli	2	0	0	0	0	0	0	0	2	0
46	(North Macedonia)	DF	Stefan Despotovski	1	0	0	0	0	0	0	0	1	0
66	(Sint Maarten)	DF	Ilounga Pata	1	0	0	0	1	0	0	0	2	0
			TOTALS	42	0	8	0	7	0	4	0	61	0

=== Player of the Month ===
Month	Player	References
July	(Albania) Alesio Mija	
August	(Albania) Alesio Mija	
September	(Nigeria) Peter Ademo	
October	(Burkina Faso) Cedric Badolo	
November	(Albania) Alesio Mija	
March	(Georgia (country)) Vladimer Mamuchashvili	
April	(Armenia) Artur Serobyan	
May	(Nigeria) Rasheed Akanbi	
