= 2024–25 Moldovan Cup =

2024–25 Cupa Moldovei
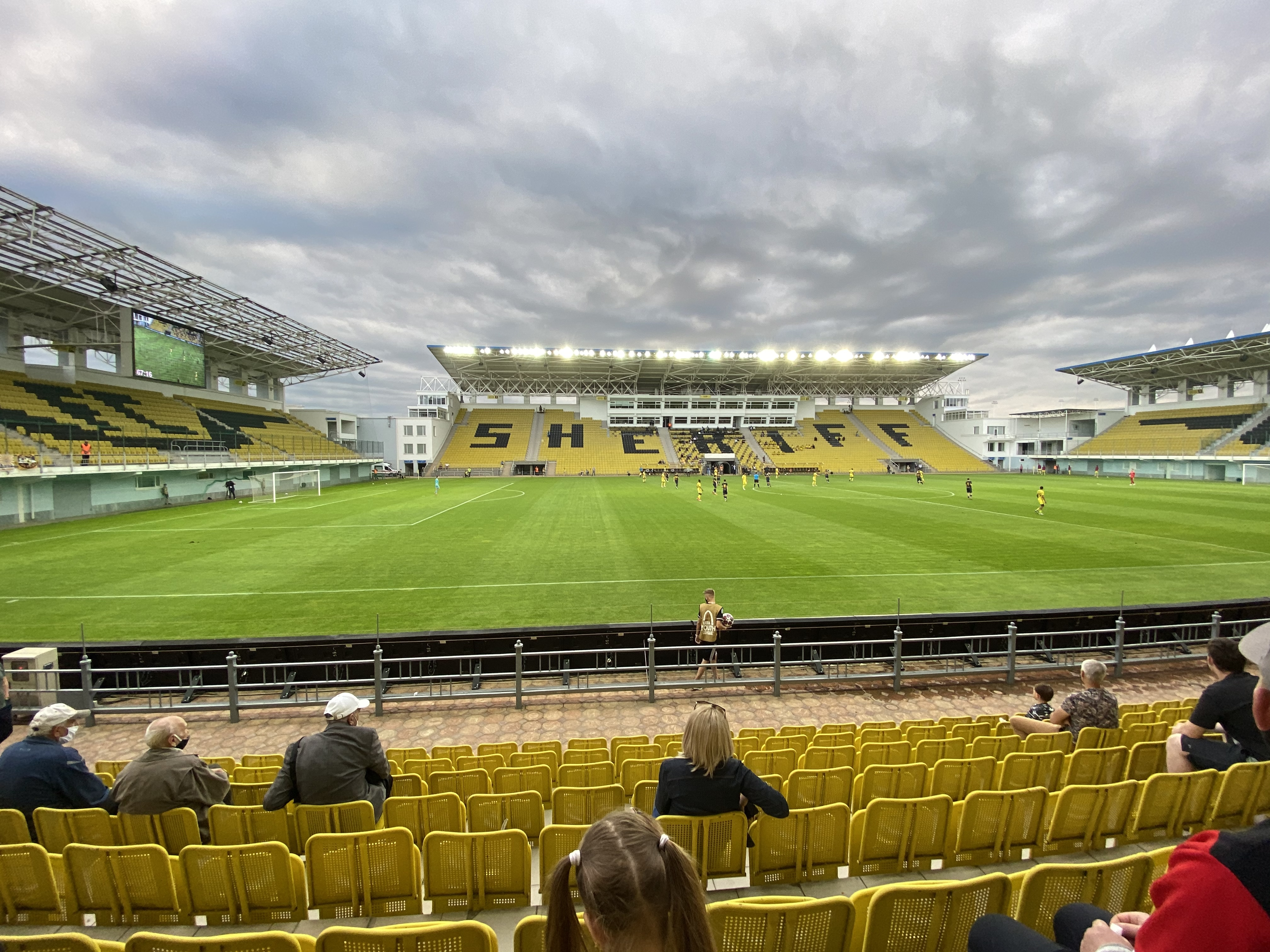
- Sheriff Arena in Tiraspol hosted the final

Tournament details
- Country: Moldova
- Dates: 4 September 2024 – 24 May 2025
- Teams: 41

Final positions
- Champions: Sheriff Tiraspol
- Runners-up: Milsami Orhei

Tournament statistics
- Matches played: 45
- Goals scored: 203 (4.51 per match)

The 2024–25 Moldovan Cup (Romanian: Cupa Moldovei) was the 34th season of the annual Moldovan football cup competition. The competition started on 4 September 2024 with the preliminary round and concluded with the final on 24 May 2025. As the winners, Sheriff Tiraspol qualified for the first qualifying round of the 2025–26 UEFA Europa League.

== Format and schedule ==
Home advantage for the first and second round is granted to the team from the lower league. In case both teams are from the same division, the team ranked higher in the current league season will play their tie away.
Home advantage for the round of 16 is granted to the team from the Super Liga. The home team in the first legs of the quarter with semi-finals and the final will be the team ranked higher in the current league season.

Round	Match dates	Fixtures	Clubs
Preliminary round	4 September 2024	1	41 → 40
First round	24–25 September 2024	16	40 → 24
Second round	21–22 October 2024	8	24 → 16
Round of 16	1–2 March 2025	8	16 → 8
Quarter-finals	2–3 April 2025 (1st leg); 15–16 April 2025 (2nd leg)	8	8 → 4
Semi-finals	30 April 2025 (1st leg); 14 May 2025 (2nd leg)	4	4 → 2
Final	24 May 2025	1	2 → 1

== Participating clubs ==
The following teams entered the competition:

Super Liga the 8 teams of the 2024–25 season	Liga 1 the 11 teams of the 2024–25 season	Liga 2 the 22 teams of the 2024–25 season
Petrocub Hîncești ^{title holder}; Zimbru Chișinău ^{runner-up}; Sheriff Tiraspol; Milsami Orhei; Bălți; Dacia Buiucani; Florești; Spartanii Sportul	Victoria Chișinău; Saksan; Univer Comrat; Speranța Drochia; Olimp Comrat; Speranis Nisporeni; FCM Ungheni; Fălești; Iskra Rîbnița; Vulturii Cutezători; Stăuceni	Real Succes; EFA Visoca; Chișinău; Locomotiva Ocnița; Constructorul Leova; Olimpia Bălți; Socol Copceac; Codru Călărași; Edineț; La Familia; Atletic Strășeni; Barsa Ungheni; Grănicerul Glodeni; Țarigrad; ~~Congaz~~; Maiak Chirsova; Atletico Bălți; Lia Sadaclia; Nisporeni-2023; Oguzsport Comrat; Real Sireți; Steaua Nordului

== Preliminary round ==
2 clubs from the Liga 2 entered this round. 20 clubs from the Liga 2 received a bye for the preliminary round. The match was played on 4 September 2024.

4 September 2024	Oguzsport Comrat (3)	4–1	Maiak Chirsova (3)	Comrat
17:00 EEST	Manastîrlî 18'; Fiodorov 30', 44' (pen.); Sofronovici 86'	Report	Ieșeanu 90+2'	Stadium: Victor Mumjiev; Attendance: 100; Referee: Denis Ivlev

== First round ==
21 clubs from the Liga 2 and 11 clubs from the Liga 1 entered this round. The draw was held on 17 September 2024. Matches were played on 24 and 25 September 2024.

24 September 2024	Congaz (3)	w/o	Speranis Nisporeni (2)	Ceadîr-Lunga
15:00 EEST				Stadium: Ceadîr-Lunga; Referee: Ruslan Țițilovschii

24 September 2024	Grănicerul Glodeni (3)	1–4	FCM Ungheni (2)	Glodeni
15:00 EEST	Grab 44' (pen.)	Report	Mihaliov 6'; Cojocaru 7', 72'; Ternovschi 83'	Stadium: Glodeni Stadium; Attendance: 100; Referee: Nicolae Bălțătescu

24 September 2024	Nisporeni-2023 (3)	1–4	Fălești (2)	Nisporeni
15:00 EEST	Teșcureanu 41'	Report	Rusu 9'; Drab 24'; Turava 50'; Savin 75'	Stadium: Mircea Eliade; Attendance: 50; Referee: Vlad Marin

24 September 2024	Atletico Bălți (3)	2–8	Victoria Chișinău (2)	Bălți
15:00 EEST	Rotaru 16', 27'	Report	Orbu 24', 48'; Lupașcu 43'; Bînzaru 52'; Blajchin 64'; Popescu 67'; Molla 77'; Postoroncă 87'	Stadium: Locomotiv Stadium; Attendance: 50; Referee: Vitalie Urzică

24 September 2024	Socol Copceac (3)	1–6	Stăuceni (2)	Copceac
15:00 EEST	Uzun 11'	Report	Oprea 2', 67'; Cheltuitor 33'; Pocriciuc 39'; Ceavdari 56' (o.g.); Galușca 76'	Stadium: Copceac Stadium; Attendance: 50; Referee: Gheorghe Dandeș

24 September 2024	Atletic Strășeni (3)	1–4	Olimp Comrat (2)	Lozova
15:00 EEST	Murjinschi 56'	Report	Crîcimari 11'; Decev 24'; Popovici 71'; Chirciu 80'	Stadium: Nicolae Simatoc; Attendance: 50; Referee: Petru Ciorbă

24 September 2024	Lia Sadaclia (3)	0–3	Locomotiva Ocnița (3)	Sadaclia
15:00 EEST		Report	Sartacov 16'; Pavlov 60'; Latîșov 69'	Stadium: Sadaclia Stadium; Attendance: 100; Referee: Anatolie Glavațchii

24 September 2024	Codru Călărași (3)	2–5	Iskra Rîbnița (2)	Călărași
15:00 EEST	Pitușcan 36'; Prunici 43'	Report	Muntean 21'; Terlețchii 29'; Pătraș 34' (pen.), 62'; Tîșcul 73'	Stadium: Călărași Stadium; Attendance: 100; Referee: Gheorghe Moldovan

24 September 2024	Edineț (3)	3–4 (a.e.t.)	Steaua Nordului (3)	Edineț
15:00 EEST	Beștanco 37' (pen.); Guriev 66'; Popovici 71'	Report	Ceavdari 15', 33'; Russu 18'; Tontici 102'	Stadium: Edineț Stadium; Attendance: 200; Referee: Serghei Gavriliuc

24 September 2024	Olimpia Bălți (3)	3–1	Oguzsport Comrat (3)	Sîngerei
15:00 EEST	Dobrovinschi 11'; Cojocaru 30'; Pahomea 53'	Report	Gheorghiev 87'	Stadium: Sîngerei Stadium; Attendance: 50; Referee: Alexandru Stefciuc

24 September 2024	Țarigrad (3)	0–2	Real Sireți (3)	Țarigrad
15:00 EEST		Report	Stegorescu 32'; Martin 86'	Stadium: Țarigrad Stadium; Attendance: 100; Referee: Viorel Neamțu

24 September 2024	Constructorul Leova (3)	0–1	Univer Comrat (2)	Leova
15:00 EEST		Report	Dobrioglo 4'	Stadium: Leova Stadium; Attendance: 100; Referee: Andrei Breguța

24 September 2024	La Familia (3)	0–7	Saksan (2)	Bender
15:00 EEST		Report	Ursu 28'; Țelic 50', 56', 86'; Bulmaga 66'; Țap 76'; Trifan 78'	Stadium: Șelcovic Stadium; Attendance: 100; Referee: Daniel Andronachi

24 September 2024	EFA Visoca (3)	4–2	Speranța Drochia (2)	Visoca
15:00 EEST	Podlesnov 23'; Pașa 71', 73'; Lungu 76'	Report	Pîslă 35'; Carazanu 45+2'	Stadium: Visoca Stadium; Attendance: 50; Referee: Andrei Cuziac

24 September 2024	Real Succes (3)	2–2 (a.e.t.) (3–1 p)	Vulturii Cutezători (2)	Chișinău
15:00 EEST	Nosenco 73', 118'	Report	Secureanu 68'; Cucoș 115'	Stadium: Real Succes; Attendance: 50; Referee: Grigore Ciugui
	Penalties
	Bulat (penalty scored); Stratila (penalty scored); Untila (penalty missed); Afanasiev (penalty scored)		(penalty missed) Ciupercă; (penalty missed) Pavlov; (penalty scored) D. Secureanu; (penalty missed) Ionițov

25 September 2024	Barsa Ungheni (3)	2–0	Chișinău (3)	Lozova
13:00 EEST	Nazari 17'; Proca 57'	Report		Stadium: Nicolae Simatoc; Attendance: 50; Referee: Pavel Mura

== Second round ==
The 16 winners from the previous round entered this round. Matches were played on 21 and 22 October 2024.

21 October 2024	Speranis Nisporeni (2)	0–4	Victoria Chișinău (2)	Nisporeni
14:00 EEST		Report	Blajchin 22'; Popescu 26'; Murovanîi 75'; Lupașcu 78'	Stadium: Mircea Eliade; Attendance: 50; Referee: Vladislav Stoianov

21 October 2024	Olimp Comrat (2)	3–1	Stăuceni (2)	Comrat
14:00 EEST	Crîcimari 30', 79'; Popovici 42'	Report	Dosca 27'	Stadium: Victor Mumjiev; Attendance: 50; Referee: Valeriu Minciună

22 October 2024	Fălești (2)	5–6 (a.e.t.)	FCM Ungheni (2)	Fălești
14:00 EEST	Suvorov 24', 49'; Rusu 47', 90+2'; Ovseanicov 114'	Report	Mihaliov 39', 108'; Cojocaru 53'; Șoldan 72'; Caț 80'; Novicov 103'	Stadium: Fălești Stadium; Attendance: 50; Referee: Cătălin Pidghirnîi

22 October 2024	Locomotiva Ocnița (3)	0–5	Iskra Rîbnița (2)	Ocnița
14:00 EEST		Report	Pătraș 10'; Muntean 18'; Gavrilița 37'; Bulat 56'; Musteață 57'	Stadium: Ocnița Stadium; Attendance: 100; Referee: Ivan Luca

22 October 2024	Barsa Ungheni (3)	0–0 (a.e.t.) (4–3 p)	Steaua Nordului (3)	Lozova
14:00 EEST		Report		Stadium: Nicolae Simatoc; Attendance: 50; Referee: Petru Ciorbă
	Penalties
	Podirca (penalty missed); Victorovici (penalty scored); Olaru (penalty scored); Cucu (penalty scored); Nazari (penalty scored)		(penalty scored) Ceavdari; (penalty missed) Obadă; (penalty scored) Ignat; (penalty missed) Tontici; (penalty scored) Ivanov

22 October 2024	Olimpia Bălți (3)	1–2	Real Sireți (3)	Bălți
14:00 EEST	Marcoci 51'	Report	Roizman 12'; Catan 55'	Stadium: Locomotiv Stadium; Attendance: 100; Referee: Gheorghe Moldovan

22 October 2024	Univer Comrat (2)	0–3	Saksan (2)	Comrat
14:00 EEST		Report	Andreiciu 32'; David 58'; Mardari 71'	Stadium: Victor Mumjiev; Attendance: 50; Referee: Andrei Ghetmanciuc

22 October 2024	Real Succes (3)	0–7	EFA Visoca (3)	Chișinău
14:00 EEST		Report	Stratan 42' (pen.), 56', 89'; Pașa 60', 74', 79'; Lungu 78'	Stadium: Real Succes; Attendance: 50; Referee: Alexandru Ababii

== Final stage ==
=== Bracket ===
Round of 16
Petrocub Hîncești	14
Olimp Comrat	1
Milsami Orhei (a.e.t.) (p)	0 (5)
Iskra Rîbnița	0 (3)
Spartanii Sportul (a.e.t.) (p)	0 (2)
Victoria Chișinău	0 (0)
Florești	1
FCM Ungheni	5
Zimbru Chișinău	5
EFA Visoca	3
Dacia Buiucani	0 (4)
Saksan (a.e.t.) (p)	0 (5)
Sheriff Tiraspol	9
Barsa Ungheni	0
Bălți	5
Real Sireți	2

Quarter-finals
Petrocub Hîncești	2	0	2 (3)
Milsami Orhei (a.e.t.) (p)	1	1	2 (4)
Spartanii Sportul	3	1	4
FCM Ungheni	3	0	3
Zimbru Chișinău	3	2	5
Saksan	0	1	1
Sheriff Tiraspol	4	1	5
Bălți	1	0	1

Semi-finals
Milsami Orhei	5	3	8
Spartanii Sportul	0	3	3
Zimbru Chișinău	1	0	1
Sheriff Tiraspol	2	1	3

Final
Milsami Orhei	1
Sheriff Tiraspol	2

== Round of 16 ==
The 8 winners from the previous round and 8 clubs from the Super Liga entered this round. The draw was held on 29 October 2024. Matches were played on 1 and 2 March 2025.

1 March 2025	Florești (1)	1–5	FCM Ungheni (2)	Chișinău
13:00 EET	Carabeț 79' (pen.)	Report	Carazanu 4'; Bacalîm 30'; Paladi 39' (o.g.); Cojocaru 70', 90+2'	Stadium: Joma Arena; Attendance: 100; Referee: Ion Orlic

1 March 2025	Bălți (1)	5–2	Real Sireți (3)	Bălți
13:00 EET	Caio 40', 45+1', 55'; Rusnac 52'; Yakovlev 76'	Report	Borovschi 32'; Brînzaniuc 90+1' (pen.)	Stadium: Bălți Stadium; Attendance: 500; Referee: Victor Bughenco

1 March 2025	Zimbru Chișinău (1)	5–3	EFA Visoca (3)	Chișinău
13:00 EET	Ordóñez 45+1', 90+3', 90+5'; Dahan 60'; Ranera 88'	Report	Stratan 19'; Pașa 22', 30'	Stadium: CPTF Stadium; Attendance: 1,000; Referee: Andrei Diordiev

1 March 2025	Milsami Orhei (1)	0–0 (a.e.t.) (5–3 p)	Iskra Rîbnița (2)	Tiraspol
15:00 EET		Report		Stadium: Sheriff Indoor Arena; Attendance: 100; Referee: Ion Tudos
	Penalties
	Gînsari (penalty scored); Rommens (penalty scored); Chele (penalty scored); Khali (penalty scored); Lupano (penalty scored)		(penalty missed) Pătraș; (penalty scored) A. Popovici; (penalty scored) Malțev; (penalty scored) Andronic

2 March 2025	Petrocub Hîncești (1)	14–1	Olimp Comrat (2)	Sărata-Galbenă
13:00 EET	Lungu 4' (pen.), 90'; Căruntu 11', 33' (pen.), 44', 54', 87'; Posmac 16'; Ambros 18' (pen.); Lupan 20'; Spătaru 62', 88'; S. Plătică 64'; Demian 82' (pen.)	Report	Sidorenco 46'	Stadium: Sărata-Galbenă; Attendance: 200; Referee: Roman Jitari

2 March 2025	Dacia Buiucani (1)	0–0 (a.e.t.) (4–5 p)	Saksan (2)	Chișinău
13:00 EET		Report		Stadium: Joma Arena; Attendance: 180; Referee: Andrei Cojocaru
	Penalties
	Țurcan (penalty scored); Novicov (penalty scored); Focșa (penalty scored); Straistaru (penalty missed); I. Efros (penalty scored)		(penalty scored) Țelic; (penalty scored) Pruteanu; (penalty scored) Sprinsean; (penalty scored) Șilcenco; (penalty scored) David

2 March 2025	Spartanii Sportul (1)	0–0 (a.e.t.) (2–0 p)	Victoria Chișinău (2)	Nisporeni
15:00 EET		Report		Stadium: Nisporeni Stadium; Attendance: 100; Referee: Andrei Breguța
	Penalties
	Gurulea (penalty scored); Rotaru (penalty missed); Nazari (penalty scored)		(penalty missed) Guțu; (penalty missed) Oprea; (penalty missed) Ș. Lupașcu; (penalty missed) Gurgurov

2 March 2025	Sheriff Tiraspol (1)	9–0	Barsa Ungheni (3)	Tiraspol
15:00 EET	Akanbi 3', 51', 71', 89'; Odede 10', 86'; Yade 47'; Mamuchashvili 55' (pen.); Mija 67'	Report		Stadium: Sheriff Indoor Arena; Attendance: 670; Referee: Andrei Ceban

== Quarter-finals ==
The first legs were played on 2 and 3 April 2025 and the second legs on 15 and 16 April 2025.

2 April 2025 1st leg	Zimbru Chișinău (1)	3–0	Saksan (2)	Chișinău
16:00 EEST	Shchebetun 45'; Ordóñez 49', 77' (pen.)	Report		Stadium: Zimbru Stadium; Attendance: 540; Referee: Andrei Ceban

15 April 2025 2nd leg	Saksan (2)	1–2 (1–5 agg.)	Zimbru Chișinău (1)	Hîncești
18:00 EEST	Cucer 3'	Report	Macrițchii 75'; Dahan 77'	Stadium: Hîncești Stadium; Attendance: 250; Referee: Victor Bughenco

2 April 2025 1st leg	Sheriff Tiraspol (1)	4–1	Bălți (1)	Tiraspol
18:00 EEST	Phelipe 3'; Marušić 13', 67'; Mamuchashvili 29'	Report	Boico 74'	Stadium: Sheriff small Arena; Attendance: 1,650; Referee: Igor Boșca

16 April 2025 2nd leg	Bălți (1)	0–1 (1–5 agg.)	Sheriff Tiraspol (1)	Bălți
18:00 EEST		Report	Marušić 55'	Stadium: Bălți Stadium; Attendance: 1,347; Referee: Ion Orlic

3 April 2025 1st leg	Spartanii Sportul (1)	3–3	FCM Ungheni (2)	Nisporeni
16:00 EEST	Rotaru 16', 50', 90+4'	Report	Cojocaru 49', 74', 86'	Stadium: Nisporeni Stadium; Attendance: 180; Referee: Ion Tudos

15 April 2025 2nd leg	FCM Ungheni (2)	0–1 (3–4 agg.)	Spartanii Sportul (1)	Nisporeni
15:00 EEST		Report	Pegza 47'	Stadium: Nisporeni Stadium; Attendance: 80; Referee: Stanislav Leu

3 April 2025 1st leg	Petrocub Hîncești (1)	2–1	Milsami Orhei (1)	Hîncești
18:00 EEST	Posmac 43'; Lungu 45'	Report	Ndon 12'	Stadium: Hîncești Stadium; Attendance: 750; Referee: Dumitru Muntean

16 April 2025 2nd leg	Milsami Orhei (1)	1–0 (a.e.t.) (2–2 agg.) (4–3 p)	Petrocub Hîncești (1)	Orhei
15:00 EEST	Keita 83'			Stadium: Sport Complex; Attendance: 800; Referee: Dumitru Muntean
	Penalties
	Yoda (penalty scored); Ghimp (penalty missed); Chele (penalty scored); Asmelash (penalty scored); Lupano (penalty scored)		(penalty missed) Posmac; (penalty scored) Demian; (penalty missed) Jardan; (penalty scored) Bivol; (penalty scored) Potîrniche

== Semi-finals ==
The first legs were played on 30 April 2025 and the second legs on 14 May 2025.

30 April 2025 1st leg	Milsami Orhei (1)	5–0	Spartanii Sportul (1)	Orhei
19:00 EEST	Kalabatama 1'; Ndon 52'; Gopey 68'; Gînsari 72'; Antoniuc 83'	Report		Stadium: Sport Complex; Attendance: 1,660; Referee: Stanislav Leu

14 May 2025 2nd leg	Spartanii Sportul (1)	3–3 (3–8 agg.)	Milsami Orhei (1)	Nisporeni
19:00 EEST	Rotaru 44' (pen.); Bulmaga 70'; Pegza 82'	Report	Gînsari 5'; Antoniuc 20'; Gopey 47'	Stadium: Nisporeni Stadium; Attendance: 200; Referee: Victor Bughenco

30 April 2025 1st leg	Zimbru Chișinău (1)	1–2	Sheriff Tiraspol (1)	Chișinău
19:00 EEST	Ebikabowei 84'	Report	Akanbi 5'; Serobyan 22'	Stadium: Zimbru Stadium; Attendance: 2,315; Referee: Roman Jitari

14 May 2025 2nd leg	Sheriff Tiraspol (1)	1–0 (3–1 agg.)	Zimbru Chișinău (1)	Tiraspol
19:00 EEST	Yade 46'	Report		Stadium: Sheriff Arena; Attendance: 2,947; Referee: Andrei Breguța

== Final ==
The final was played on Saturday 24 May 2025 at the Sheriff Arena in Tiraspol.

24 May 2025
19:00 EEST

Milsami Orhei	1–2	Sheriff Tiraspol
Gopey 90'	Report	Akanbi 85', 90+1'

Sheriff Arena, Tiraspol
Attendance: 8,953
Referee: Denis Ivlev (Moldova)

Milsami	Sheriff

GK	1	(Moldova) Emil Tîmbur	(yellow card) 90+2'	(red card) 90+2'
DF	4	(Belgium) Danny Lupano
DF	22	(Moldova) Vasile Jardan	(yellow card) 31'	(substituted off) 46'
DF	24	(Netherlands) Dehninio Muringen		(substituted off) 88'
DF	25	(France) Nabil Khali
DF	29	(Netherlands) Hennos Asmelash	(yellow card) 16'	(substituted off) 26'
MF	5	(Nigeria) Christopher Nwaeze	(yellow card) 90+5'
MF	10	(Moldova) Radu Gînsari (c)	(yellow card) 82'
MF	18	(Burkina Faso) Abdoul Yoda	(red card) 90+5'
FW	15	(Nigeria) Ime Ndon		(substituted off) 80'
FW	28	(Norway) Kabamba Kalabatama	(yellow card) 81'
Substitutes:
GK	12	(Moldova) Denis Vornic
GK	31	(Moldova) Mihail Cioban
DF	6	(Moldova) Ion Ghimp		(substituted on) 46'
DF	17	(Moldova) Igor Arhirii
DF	21	(Moldova) Vladislav Zavalișca
MF	7	(Moldova) Daniel Lisu
MF	11	(Moldova) Sorin Chele		(substituted on) 80'
MF	13	(Moldova) Vasile Luchița		(substituted on) 88'
MF	16	(Moldova) Alexandru Antoniuc
MF	27	(Mali) Sibiry Keita		(substituted on) 26'	(substituted off) 80'
FW	9	(Nigeria) Stephen Gopey		(substituted on) 80'
Head Coach:
(Moldova) Igor Picușceac

GK	1	(Moldova) Victor Străistari
DF	3	(Ghana) Nana Boakye
DF	6	(Brazil) Raí Lopes
DF	20	(Ivory Coast) Armel Zohouri
DF	29	(Mali) Soumaïla Magossouba
MF	8	(Cape Verde) João Paulo		(substituted off) 46'
MF	10	(Armenia) Artur Serobyan	(yellow card) 22'	(substituted off) 68'
MF	18	(Mali) Moussa Kyabou (c)
FW	11	(Burkina Faso) Cyrille Bayala
FW	61	(Nigeria) Rasheed Akanbi
FW	90	(Mauritania) Ndiaga Yade
Substitutes:
GK	28	(Slovenia) Emil Velić
DF	4	(Liberia) Natus Swen		(substituted on) 90+6'
DF	26	(Moldova) Artiom Dijinari
DF	33	(Brazil) Matheus Lins
DF	44	(Albania) Alesio Mija
MF	24	(Moldova) Danila Forov
MF	71	(Georgia (country)) Vladimer Mamuchashvili		(substituted on) 68'
FW	9	(Montenegro) Aleksa Marušić
FW	12	(Nigeria) Elijah Odede
FW	27	(Moldova) Veaceslav Cozma
FW	70	(Brazil) Luis Phelipe	(yellow card) 90+5'	(substituted on) 46'	(substituted off) 90+6'
Head Coach:
(Moldova) Victor Mihailov

Assistant referees:
Vladislav Lifciu (Moldova)
Ghenadie Lisița (Moldova)
Additional assistant referees:
Andrei Breguța (Moldova)
Victor Bughenco (Moldova)
Fourth official:
Victor Luchița (Moldova)

Match rules

- 90 minutes.
- 30 minutes of extra time if necessary.
- Penalty shoot-out if score is still level.
- Eleven named substitutes.
- Maximum of five substitutions, with a sixth allowed in extra time.
