= Ime Ndon =

Nigerian footballer (born 2003)

Personal information
- Full name: Ime Udo Ndon
- Date of birth: 7 June 2003 (age 23)
- Place of birth: Uyo, Nigeria
- Height: 1.73 m (5 ft 8 in)
- Position: Winger

Team information
- Current team: Metaloglobus București
- Number: 17

Youth career
- –2021: Jimmy Football Academy
- 2021–2022: Kafr Qasim

Senior career*
Years	Team	Apps	(Gls)
2022–2023	Kafr Qasim	16	(0)
2023	Hammam Sousse	10	(2)
2024–2026	Milsami Orhei	37	(7)
2026	UTA Arad	1	(0)
2026–	Metaloglobus București	10	(4)
- * Club domestic league appearances and goals as of 31 October 2026

Ime Udo Ndon (born 7 June 2003) is a Nigerian professional footballer who plays as a winger for Liga II club Metaloglobus București.

== Honours ==
Milsami Orhei

- Moldovan Super Liga: 2024–25
- Cupa Moldovei runner-up: 2024–25
