= Elijah Odede =

Nigerian footballer (born 2007)

Personal information
- Full name: Elijah Olaniyi Odede
- Date of birth: 12 January 2007 (age 19)
- Place of birth: Ogbomoso, Nigeria
- Height: 1.75 m (5 ft 9 in)
- Position: Winger

Team information
- Current team: Lommel (on loan from Troyes)
- Number: 12

Youth career
- Castle FA

Senior career*
Years	Team	Apps	(Gls)
2025	Sheriff Tiraspol	17	(4)
2025–	Troyes	10	(0)
2026–	→ Lommel (loan)	0	(0)
- * Club domestic league appearances and goals as of 4 September 2026

Elijah Olaniyi Odede (born 12 January 2007) is a Nigerian professional footballer who plays as a winger for Belgian Pro League club Lommel on loan from French club Troyes.

== Career ==
A product of the youth academy of the Castle Football Academy, Odede joined the Moldovan Super Liga club Sheriff Tiraspol on 18 February 2025. On 1 September 2025, he joined Ligue 2 side Troyes on a 5-year contract. He helped the club win the 2025–26 Ligue 2, earning promotion to Ligue 1.

On 3 September 2026, Odede was loaned by Lommel in Belgium for the 2026–27 season.

== International career ==
Odede was called up to the Nigeria U20s for a set of friendlies in August 2025.

== Career statistics ==
=== Club ===
As of match played 9 May 2026

Appearances and goals by club, season and competition
Club	Season	League			National cup (Note: Includes Moldovan Cup, Coupe de France)		Continental		Other		Total	
Club	Season	Division	Apps	Goals	Apps	Goals	Apps	Goals	Apps	Goals	Apps	Goals
Sheriff Tiraspol	2024–25	Super Liga	8	0	4	2	0 (Note: Zero appearances in the UEFA Europa League and zero appearances in the UEFA Conference League)	0	—		12	2
Sheriff Tiraspol	2025–26	Super Liga	9	4	0	0	5 (Note: Three appearances and two goals in the UEFA Europa League, two appearances and one goal in the UEFA Conference League)	0	—		14	7
Sheriff Tiraspol	Total		17	4	4	2	5	3	-	-	26	9
ES Troyes	2025–26	Ligue 2	10	0	3	1	—		—		13	1
Career total			27	4	7	3	5	3	0	0	39	8

== Honours ==
Sheriff Tiraspol

- Moldovan Cup: 2024–25

Troyes

- Ligue 2: 2025–26
