= Ilounga Pata =

Sint Maartener footballer (born 2000)

Personal information
- Full name: Ilounga Isea Pata
- Date of birth: 12 November 2000 (age 25)
- Place of birth: Philipsburg, Netherlands Antilles
- Height: 1.82 m (6 ft 0 in)
- Position: Right-back

Team information
- Current team: TOP Oss
- Number: 2

Youth career
- –2017: Alphense Boys
- 2017–2018: ADO Den Haag
- 2018–2019: Alphense Boys
- 2019–2021: Huddersfield Town

Senior career*
Years	Team	Apps	(Gls)
2021–2024	TOP Oss	92	(2)
2024–2025	Sheriff Tiraspol	4	(0)
2025	Mafra	1	(0)
2025–	TOP Oss	15	(0)

International career^{‡}
2022–	Sint Maarten	15	(1)
- * Club domestic league appearances and goals as of 28 April 2026 ‡ National team caps and goals as of 18 November 2024

Ilounga Isea Pata (born 12 November 2000) is a Sint Maartener professional footballer who plays as a right-back for Dutch Eerste Divisie club TOP Oss and the Sint Maarten national team.

== Club career ==
Pata is a former youth academy player of Alphense Boys and ADO Den Haag. He joined the youth academy of Huddersfield Town in July 2019. In August 2021, he joined Dutch Eerste Divisie club TOP Oss. He made his professional debut for the club on 10 September 2021 in a 3–3 draw against ADO Den Haag.

On 4 July 2024, Pata joined Moldovan Super Liga club Sheriff Tiraspol.

In January 2026, Pata returned to TOP Oss until the end of the 2025–26 season.

== Career statistics ==
=== Club ===
As of match played 11 July 2024

Appearances and goals by club, season and competition
Club	Season	League			National cup		Continental		Other		Total	
Club	Season	Division	Apps	Goals	Apps	Goals	Apps	Goals	Apps	Goals	Apps	Goals
TOP Oss	2021–22	Eerste Divisie	30	1	1	0	—		—		31	1
TOP Oss	2022–23	Eerste Divisie	24	1	0	0	—		—		24	1
TOP Oss	2023–24	Eerste Divisie	38	0	1	0	—		—		39	0
TOP Oss	Total		92	2	2	0	0	0	0	0	94	2
Sheriff Tiraspol	2024–25	Moldovan Super Liga	0	0	0	0	1 (Note: Appearance in UEFA Europa League)	0	0	0	1	0
Career total			92	2	2	0	1	0	0	0	95	2

=== International ===
As of match played 18 November 2024

Appearances and goals by national team and year
National team	Year	Apps	Goals
Sint Maarten	2022	3	0
Sint Maarten	2023	5	1
Sint Maarten	2024	7	0
Total		15	1

Scores and results list Sint Maarten's goal tally first, score column indicates score after each Pata goal.

List of international goals scored by Ilounga Pata
No.	Date	Venue	Opponent	Score	Result	Competition
1	15 October 2023	SKNFA Technical Center, Basseterre, Saint Kitts and Nevis	Saint Kitts and Nevis	1–0	1–0	2023–24 CONCACAF Nations League
