= Luis Phelipe =

Brazilian footballer (born 2001)

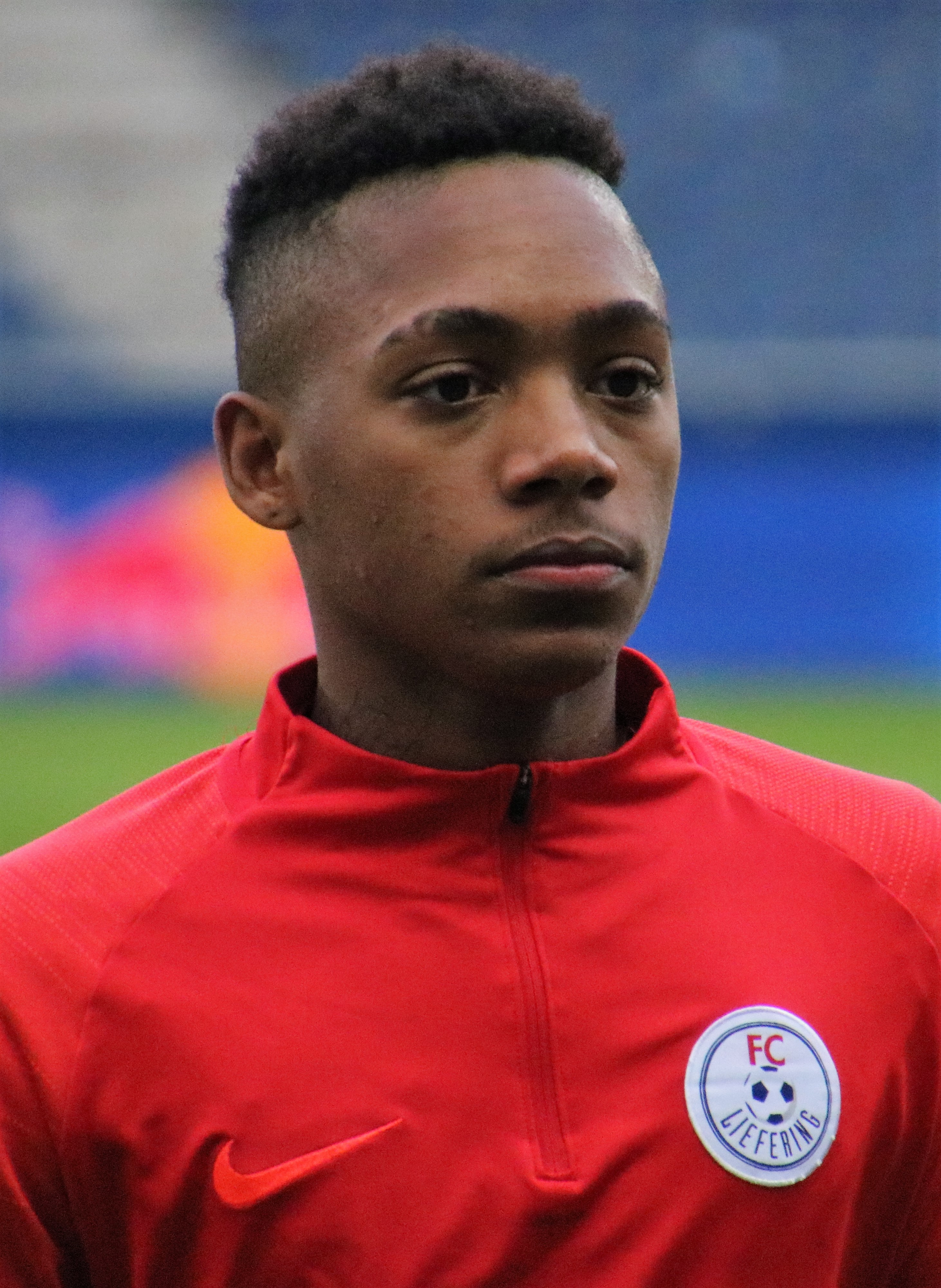
- Phelipe with Liefering in 2020

Personal information
- Full name: Luis Phelipe de Souza Figueiredo
- Date of birth: 12 February 2001 (age 25)
- Place of birth: Santos, Brazil
- Height: 1.83 m (6 ft 0 in)
- Position: Forward

Team information
- Current team: Lee Man (on loan from Sheriff Tiraspol)
- Number: 19

Youth career
- 2014–2015: Portuguesa Santista
- 2016–2018: Red Bull Brasil

Senior career*
Years	Team	Apps	(Gls)
2018–2019	Red Bull Brasil	0	(0)
2019	→ Red Bull Bragantino (loan)	2	(0)
2019–2022	Red Bull Salzburg	0	(0)
2019–2020	→ Liefering (loan)	19	(4)
2020–2021	→ Red Bull Bragantino (loan)	11	(1)
2021–2022	→ Lugano (loan)	5	(0)
2021–2022	→ Team Ticino U21 (loan)	5	(0)
2022–2023	Atlético Goianiense	0	(0)
2022	→ Náutico (loan)	11	(1)
2023	→ Botafogo (loan)	0	(0)
2023	→ Paysandu (loan)	5	(0)
2023–2024	Politehnica Iași	19	(3)
2024–2025	FCSB	17	(0)
2025–	Sheriff Tiraspol	14	(0)
2026–	→ Lee Man (loan)	7	(1)
- * Club domestic league appearances and goals as of 20 November 2026

Luis Phelipe de Souza Figueiredo (born 20 February 2001) is a Brazilian professional footballer who currently plays as a forward for Hong Kong Premier League club Lee Man, on loan from Moldovan Super Liga club Sheriff Tiraspol.

== Career ==
=== Red Bull Brasil / Red Bull Bragantino ===
Born in Santos, São Paulo, Phelipe represented the youth sides of Santos and Portuguesa Santista before joining Red Bull Brasil in 2016. He made his senior debut for the latter club on 22 September 2018, coming on as a second-half substitute and scoring in a 3–1 home win over Desportivo Brasil in the Copa Paulista.

Phelipe became a Red Bull Bragantino player when Red Bull Brasil merged with Clube Atlético Bragantino in April 2019. He made his Série B debut on 18 May, replacing Barreto late into a 0–1 away loss to Londrina. Phelipe featured in just one further match for Bragantino during the campaign, as his side achieved Série A promotion as champions.

=== Red Bull Salzburg ===
On 18 July 2019, Austrian team Red Bull Salzburg announced the signing of Phelipe on a five-year contract.

==== Various loans ====
Phelipe was immediately sent on loan to FC Liefering for the 2019–20 season, being used mainly as a substitute and scoring four goals as the club finished third in the 2. Liga. In August 2020, he returned to his former side Red Bull Bragantino on loan for one year. He made his Série A debut on the 19th that month, replacing Morato and scoring the winner in a 2–1 home success over Fluminense.

Phelipe however did not establish himself on his return at Bragantino, and on 28 July 2021 moved to Swiss Super League club Lugano on another one-year loan deal, joining several compatriots including manager Abel Braga. He was very rarely used after Mattia Croci-Torti replaced Braga, and on 11 February 2022 Lugano announced the early termination of Phelipe's loan. The next day, Red Bull Salzburg also terminated his deal.

=== Atlético Goianiense ===
Phelipe joined Série A club Atlético Goianiense as a free agent on 1 March 2022. He only made two appearances for the Dragão, both in the state league.

==== Various loans ====
On 14 April 2022, Phelipe was loaned out to Náutico in the second division. In the first half of 2023, he represented in quick succession Botafogo and Paysandu, also on loan.

=== Politehnica Iași ===
On 29 June 2023, Phelipe signed a two-year deal with Romanian side Politehnica Iași, newly promoted to the Liga I. He scored his first goals on 30 July, his double helping to a 3–1 away league win over defending champion Farul Constanța.

=== FCSB ===
On 8 December 2023, Iași chairman Cornel Șfaițer announced that Phelipe would be transferred to fellow league club FCSB for €200,000 and 20% interest when the winter transfer window opens. The move was confirmed by FCSB on 24 December.

=== Sheriff Tiraspol ===
On 23 January 2025, Phelipe joined Moldovan Super Liga club Sheriff Tiraspol.

==== Loan to Lee Man ====
On 1 August 2026, Phelipe joined Hong Kong Premier League club Lee Man on a loan move for the 2026–27 season.

== Style of play ==
Phelipe excels as an attacking midfielder and is versatile enough to play various offensive positions, including as a main striker. However, his preferred role is on the wing. Known for his technical skills, he can easily beat opponents one-on-one and disrupt defences with his precise passing. His delicate frame makes him a frequent target for tackles, sometimes taking him out of play. Additionally, Phelipe finds it more challenging to assist in defence when playing on the wing compared to a central position.

== Personal life ==
Phelipe is married and has one child.

== Career statistics ==
=== Club ===
As of match played 1 December 2025

Appearances and goals by club, season and competition
Club	Season	League			State League		National Cup		Continental		Other		Total	
Club	Season	Division	Apps	Goals	Apps	Goals	Apps	Goals	Apps	Goals	Apps	Goals	Apps	Goals
Red Bull Brasil	2018	Paulista	—		0	0	—		—		2 (Note: Appearances in Copa Paulista)	1	2	1
Red Bull Brasil	2019	Paulista	—		1	0	—		—		—		1	0
Red Bull Brasil	Subtotal		—		1	0	—		—		2	1	3	1
Red Bull Bragantino	2019	Série B	2	0	—		—		—		—		2	0
Liefering	2019–20	2. Liga	19	4	—		—		—		—		19	4
Red Bull Bragantino	2020	Série A	11	1	—		1	0	—		—		12	1
Red Bull Bragantino	2021	Série A	0	0	5	0	0	0	0	0	—		5	0
Red Bull Bragantino	Subtotal		11	1	5	0	1	0	0	0	—		17	1
Lugano	2021–22	Swiss Super League	5	0	—		0	0	—		—		5	0
Atlético Goianiense	2022	Série A	0	0	2	0	0	0	0	0	—		2	0
Náutico (loan)	2022	Série B	11	1	—		—		—		—		11	1
Botafogo (loan)	2023	Série A	—		1	0	—		—		—		1	0
Paysandu (loan)	2023	Série C	5	0	5	0	2	0	—		—		12	0
Politehnica Iași	2023–24	Liga I	19	3	—		1	0	—		—		20	3
FCSB	2023–24	Liga I	10	0 (Note: Does not include one goal scored on 3 March 2024 against Petrolul Ploiești. LPF, the governing body that runs the Liga I, attributes it as an own goal by Valentin Țicu, while statistics website Soccerway attributes it to Phelipe.)	—		—		—		—		10	0
FCSB	2024–25	Liga I	7	0	—		3	1	5	0	1	1	16	2
FCSB	Subtotal		17	0	—		3	1	5	0	1	1	26	2
Sheriff Tiraspol	2024–25	Super Liga	5	0	—		2	1	—		—		7	1
Sheriff Tiraspol	2024–25	Super Liga	9	0	—		1	1	—		—		10	1
Sheriff Tiraspol	Subtotal		14	0	—		3	2	0	0	0	0	17	2
Career total			103	9	14	0	10	3	5	0	3	2	135	14

== Honours ==
Red Bull Bragantino

- Série B: 2019

Atlético Goianiense

- Campeonato Goiano: 2022

Náutico

- Campeonato Pernambucano: 2022

Paysandu

- Copa Verde runner-up: 2023

FCSB

- Liga I: 2023–24, 2024–25
- Supercupa României: 2024

Sheriff Tiraspol

- Cupa Moldovei: 2024–25
