= Rashed Al-Tumi =

Maltese footballer (born 2000)

Personal information
- Date of birth: 14 October 2000 (age 26)
- Place of birth: Valletta, Malta
- Height: 1.97 m (6 ft 6 in)
- Position: Goalkeeper

Team information
- Current team: Sliema Wanderers
- Number: 22

Youth career
- –2016: Valletta
- 2016–2019: Palermo

Senior career*
Years	Team	Apps	(Gls)
2019–2020	Casarano	14	(0)
2020–2021	Arzachena	6	(0)
2021–2022	Nocerina	3	(0)
2022–2024	Sliema Wanderers	36	(0)
2024–2025	Sheriff Tiraspol	1	(0)
2025–	Sliema Wanderers	25	(0)

International career^{‡}
2016	Malta U17	1	(0)
2017–2018	Malta U19	2	(0)
2020–2021	Malta U21	3	(0)
2024–	Malta	5	(0)
- * Club domestic league appearances and goals as of 18 May 2026 ‡ National team caps and goals as of 18:05, 27 September 2026 (UTC)

Rashed Al-Tumi (born 14 October 2000) is a Maltese professional footballer who plays as a goalkeeper for Sliema Wanderers and the Malta national team.

== International career ==
Born in Malta, Al-Tumi is of Libyan descent, thus being eligible to play for either Malta or Libya. He has expressed pride in representing Malta, stating, "I can represent Libya, but I don't want to because I feel Maltese." Al-Tumi made his debut for the senior Malta national team on 26 March 2024 in a friendly against Belarus. Which ended 0–0 full-time. He has also played for Malta U17, Malta U19 and Malta U21 teams.
