= Stefan Despotovski =

Macedonian footballer

Personal information
- Full name: Stefan Despotovski
- Date of birth: 23 January 2003 (age 23)
- Place of birth: Skopje, Macedonia
- Height: 1.82 m (6 ft 0 in)
- Position: Right-back

Team information
- Current team: OFK Beograd
- Number: 2

Youth career
- –2021: Red Star Belgrade
- 2019: → Grafičar (youth loan)

Senior career*
Years	Team	Apps	(Gls)
2021–2022	Red Star Belgrade	0	(0)
2021–2022	→ Grafičar (loan)	26	(0)
2023–2024	Rabotnički	40	(1)
2024–2025	Sheriff Tiraspol	6	(0)
2025–	OFK Beograd	40	(1)

International career^{‡}
2022–2024	North Macedonia U21	24	(0)
2025–	North Macedonia	2	(0)
- * Club domestic league appearances and goals as of 12 June 2026 ‡ National team caps and goals as of 9 June 2025

Stefan Despotovski (Macedonian: Стефан Деспотовски; born 23 January 2003) is a Macedonian professional footballer who plays as a right-back for Serbian club OFK Beograd and the North Macedonia national team.

== Club career ==
He started his career in the youth academy of Partizan before moving to Red Star Belgrade in 2015. In February 2021, he was loaned to Grafičar where he made his professional debut on 24 March in a 2–1 Serbian First League (Serbian second division) match against Žarkovo. He remained a free agent at the end of the 2021–2022 season, and in January 2023 he signed a contract in his homeland with Rabotnički, where he played for a season and a half before signing with Moldovan club Sheriff Tiraspol.

On 4 February 2025 he was purchased outright by OFK Beograd.

Despotovski previously played for the Macedonia U21.

He made his debut for the Macedonia national team on 9 June 2025 in a 2026 FIFA World Cup qualification match where they won 1–0 against Kazakhstan.
