= Johan Rodallega =

Colombian footballer (born 2005)

Personal information
- Full name: Johan Stiben Rodallega Navia
- Date of birth: 24 April 2005 (age 21)
- Place of birth: Colombia
- Height: 1.79 m (5 ft 10 in)
- Position: Midfielder

Team information
- Current team: FC Sheriff Tiraspol
- Number: 17

Youth career
- –2021: Incauca FC
- 2021–2024: Millonarios F.C.

Senior career*
Years	Team	Apps	(Gls)
2024–	Millonarios F.C.		
2025	→ FC Sheriff Tiraspol (loan)	0	(0)

International career
- Colombia U-17
2023–	Colombia U-20		
- * Club domestic league appearances and goals as of 27 June 2025

Johan Stiben Rodallega Navia (born 24 April 2005) is a Colombian footballer who played as a midfielder for Moldova Liga club FC Sheriff.

== Club career ==
Johan began his youth career at Incauca FC, where he played until 2021 before move to Millonarios. With Millonarios, he played for the U-17 and U-20 team, participated in the Supercopa Juvenil FCF.

In 2025, Johan was loaned to FC Sheriff for one year.

== International career ==
Johan played for the Under-17 and Under-20 Colombia.
