= Nana Kwame Boakye =

Ghanaian footballer (born 2005)

Personal information
- Full name: Nana Kwame Boakye
- Date of birth: 5 December 2005 (age 20)
- Height: 1.87 m (6 ft 2 in)
- Position: Centre-back

Team information
- Current team: SK Brann
- Number: 4

Senior career*
Years	Team	Apps	(Gls)
2021–2022	Future Stars	3	(0)
2022–2023	Nkoranza Warriors	21	(0)
2023–2024	Berekum City	13	(0)
2024–2025	Sheriff Tiraspol	34	(3)
2025–	Brann	8	(0)
2025	Brann 2	2	(0)

International career^{‡}
2024–	Ghana U20	6	(0)
- * Club domestic league appearances and goals as of 22 March 2026 ‡ National team caps and goals as of 30 October 2025

Nana Kwame Boakye (born 5 December 2005) is a Ghanaian professional footballer who plays for SK Brann. (Note: Nana Kwame Boakye at the Norwegian Football Federation (in Norwegian))

== Career statistics ==
As of 22 March 2026

Club	Season	League			National Cup (Note: Includes Moldovan Cup and Norwegian Football Cup)		Europe		Other		Total	
Club	Season	Division	Apps	Goals	Apps	Goals	Apps	Goals	Apps	Goals	Apps	Goals
Future Stars	2021-22	Division One League	3	0	—		—		—		3	0
Nkoranza Warriors	2022-23	Division One League	21	0	—		—		—		21	0
Berekum City	2024-25	Division One League	13	0	—		—		—		13	0
Sheriff Tiraspol	2024–25	Moldovan Liga	24	3	6	0	5 (Note: Appearances in the UEFA Conference League and UEFA Europa League)	0	—		35	3
Sheriff Tiraspol	2025–26	Moldovan Liga	10	0	0	0	6	0	—		16	0
Sheriff Tiraspol	Total		34	3	6	0	11	0	0	0	51	3
Brann	2025	Eliteserien	6	0	1	1	3 (Note: Appearances in UEFA Europa League)	0	—		10	1
Brann	2026	Eliteserien	2	0	2	0	2	0	—		6	0
Brann	Total		8	0	3	1	5	0	0	0	16	1
Brann 2	2025	Norwegian Second Division	2	0	—		—		—		2	0
Career total			81	3	9	1	16	0	0	0	103	4

== Honours ==
=== Sheriff Tiraspol ===
- Moldovan Liga runner-up 2024–25
- Moldovan Cup winner 2024–25
