= Moussa Kyabou =

Malian footballer

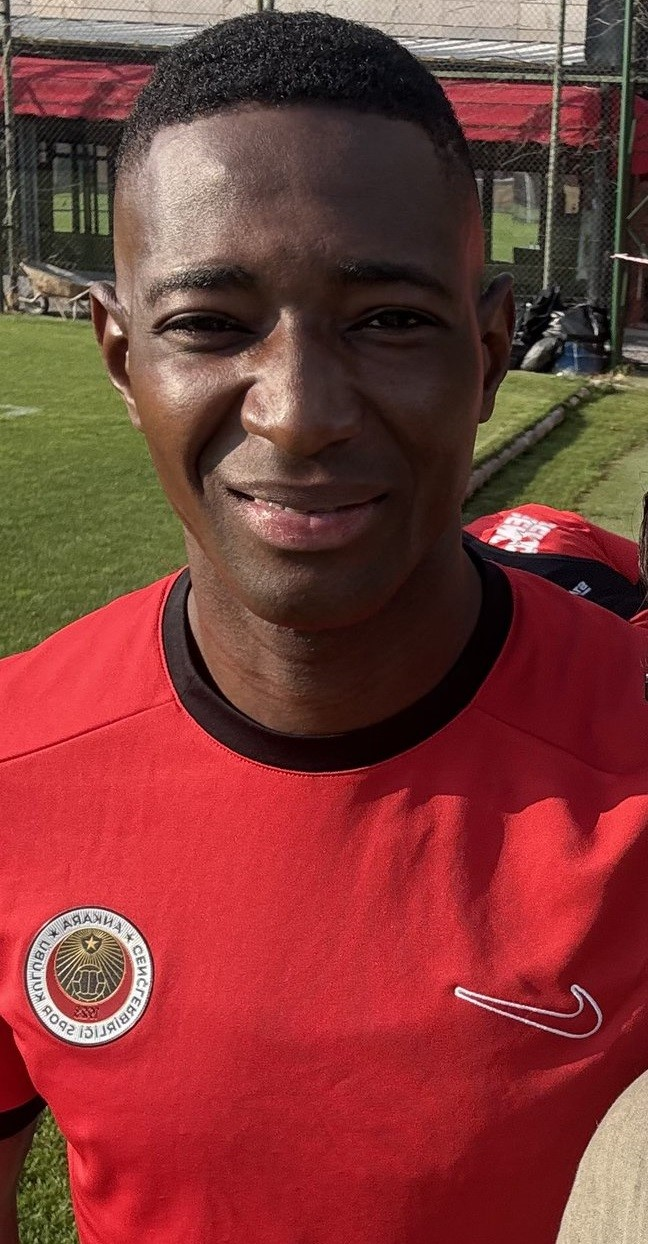
- Kyabou with Gençlerbirliği in 2025

Personal information
- Date of birth: 18 April 1998 (age 28)
- Place of birth: Bamako, Mali
- Height: 1.83 m (6 ft 0 in)
- Position: Defensive midfielder

Team information
- Current team: Sheriff Tiraspol
- Number: 18

Senior career*
Years	Team	Apps	(Gls)
2017–2021	USC Kita		
2021–2025	Sheriff Tiraspol	52	(0)
2025–2026	Gençlerbirliği	3	(0)
2026–	Sheriff Tiraspol	1	(0)

International career^{‡}
2019–	Mali	8	(0)
- * Club domestic league appearances and goals as of 17 October 2026 ‡ National team caps and goals as of 15 June 2021

Moussa Kyabou (born 18 April 1998) is a Malian professional footballer who plays as an defensive midfielder for Moldovan Liga club Sheriff Tiraspol and the Mali national team.

== Club career ==
On 15 March 2021, Kyabou joined Moldovan Super Liga team Sheriff Tiraspol. Kyabou extended his contract with Sheriff Tiraspol on 27 September 2023. On 1 July 2025, Sheriff announced the departure of Kyabou after his contract had expired.

Kyabou joined Gençlerbirliği on 5 July 2025.

On 14 September 2026, Sheriff Tiraspol announced the return of Kyabou to the club.

== Career statistics ==
=== Club ===
As of match played 31 August 2025.

Appearances and goals by club, season and competition
Club	Season	League			National cup (Note: Includes Moldovan Cup)		League cup		Continental		Other		Total	
Club	Season	Division	Apps	Goals	Apps	Goals	Apps	Goals	Apps	Goals	Apps	Goals	Apps	Goals
Sheriff Tiraspol	2020–21	Moldovan Super Liga	8	0	3	0	—		0 (Note: Zero appearances and goals in the UEFA Champions League and UEFA Europa League)	0	—		11	0
Sheriff Tiraspol	2021–22	Moldovan Super Liga	10	0	3	0	—		4 (Note: Three appearances and zero goals in the UEFA Champions League, one appearance and zero goals in the UEFA Europa League)	0	—		17	0
Sheriff Tiraspol	2022–23	Moldovan Super Liga	10	0	3	0	—		17 (Note: Six appearances and zero goals in the UEFA Champions League, seven appearances and zero goals in the UEFA Europa League and four appearances and zero goals in the UEFA Europa Conference League)	0	—		30	0
Sheriff Tiraspol	2023–24	Moldovan Super Liga	7	0	4	0	—		4 (Note: Appearances in the UEFA Champions League)	0	—		15	0
Sheriff Tiraspol	2024–25	Moldovan Super Liga	17	0	3	0	—		6 (Note: Four appearances and zero goals in the UEFA Europa League, two appearances and zero goals in the UEFA Conference League)	0	—		26	0
Total			52	0	16	0	0	0	31	0	0	0	99	0
Gençlerbirliği	2025–26	Süper Lig	2	0	0	0	—		0	0	—		2	0
Total			2	0	0	0	0	0	0	0	0	0	2	0
Career total			54	0	16	0	0	0	31	0	0	0	101	0

=== International ===
As of match played 15 June 2021

National team	Year	Apps	Goals
Mali	2019	0	0
Mali	2020	0	0
Mali	2021	8	0
Total		11	0
