= Rasheed Akanbi =

Nigerian footballer (born 1999)

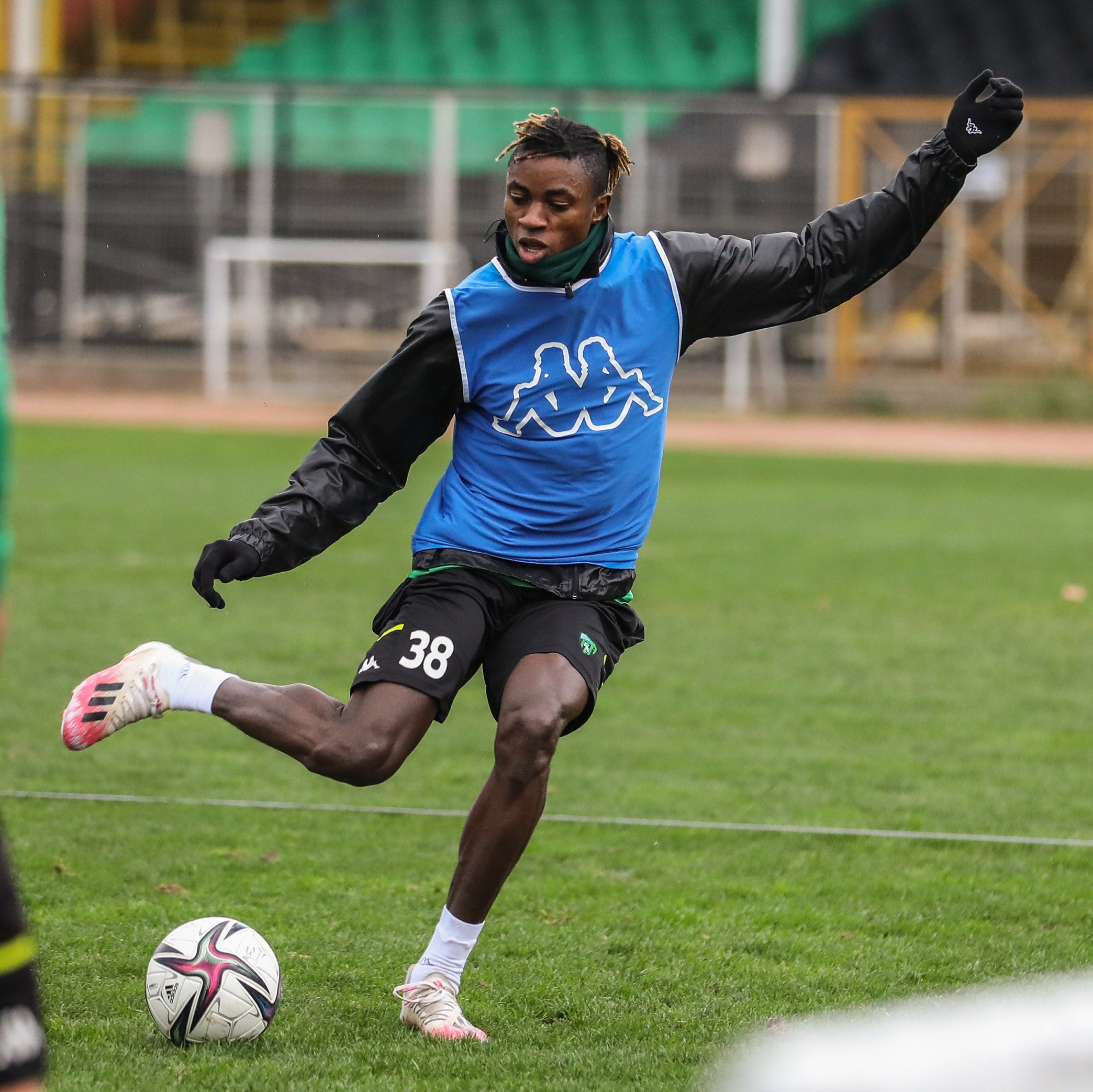
- Rasheed with Kocaelispor in 2022

Personal information
- Full name: Rasheed Ibrahim Akanbi
- Date of birth: 9 May 1999 (age 27)
- Place of birth: Lagos, Nigeria
- Height: 1.89 m (6 ft 2 in)
- Position: Forward

Youth career
- –2017: Buckswood FA
- 2017–2019: Future PA

Senior career*
Years	Team	Apps	(Gls)
2019	Foça Belediyespor		
2019–2020	Tire Belediyespor		
2020–2021	Menemenspor	46	(12)
2022	Kocaelispor	15	(3)
2022–2025	Sheriff Tiraspol	47	(18)
2025–2026	Boluspor	32	(4)
- * Club domestic league appearances and goals as of 21 June 2026

Rasheed Ibrahim Akanbi(born 9 May 1999) is a Nigerian professional footballer who plays as a forward.

== Career ==
On 22 June 2022, Akanbi signed a contract with Moldovan Super Liga club Sheriff Tiraspol. On 1 July 2025, Sheriff announced the departure of Akanbi after his contract had expired.

On 14 July 2025, TFF 1. Lig club Boluspor announced the signing of Akanbi to a two-year contract.

== Career statistics ==
=== Club ===
As of match played 24 May 2025

Appearances and goals by club, season and competition
Club	Season	League			National cup (Note: Includes Turkish Cup, Moldovan Cup)		Europe		Total	
Club	Season	Division	Apps	Goals	Apps	Goals	Apps	Goals	Apps	Goals
Menemenspor	2019–20	TFF First League	7	0	0	0	—		7	0
Menemenspor	2020–21	TFF First League	25	8	0	0	—		25	8
Menemenspor	2021–22	TFF First League	14	4	0	0	—		14	4
Menemenspor	Total		46	12	0	0	—		46	12
Kocaelispor	2021–22	TFF First League	15	3	0	0	—		15	3
Sheriff Tiraspol	2022–23	Moldovan Super Liga	19	8	2	1	17 (Note: Six appearances and two goals in UEFA Champions League, eight appearances and two goals in UEFA Europa League, three appearances in UEFA Europa Conference League)	4	38	13
Sheriff Tiraspol	2023–24	Moldovan Super Liga	9	3	4	1	0 (Note: Zero appearances in the UEFA Champions League, UEFA Europa League, and UEFA Europa Conference League)	0	13	4
Sheriff Tiraspol	2024–25	Moldovan Super Liga	20	7	6	7	6 (Note: Four appearances in the UEFA Europa League, and two appearances in the UEFA Europa Conference League)	0	32	14
Sheriff Tiraspol	Total		48	18	12	9	23	4	83	31
Career total			109	33	12	9	23	4	144	46

== Honours ==
Sheriff Tiraspol

- Moldovan Super Liga: 2022–23
- Moldovan Cup: 2022–23
