= João Paulo Fernandes (footballer) =

Cape Verdean footballer (born 1998)

João Paulo
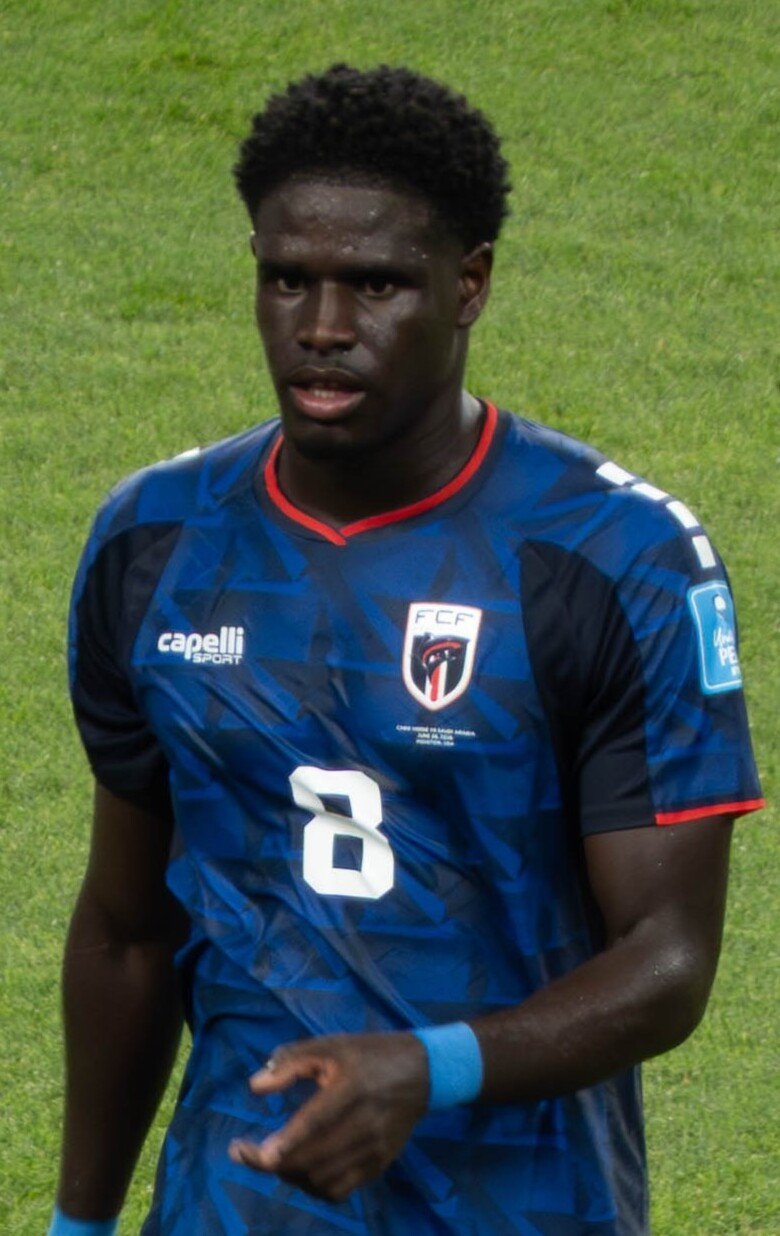
- Fernandes with Cape Verde in 2026

Personal information
- Full name: João Paulo Moreira Fernandes
- Date of birth: 26 May 1998 (age 28)
- Place of birth: Ribeira Grande de Santiago, Cape Verde
- Height: 1.80 m (5 ft 11 in)
- Positions: Midfielder; left-back

Team information
- Current team: FCSB
- Number: 18

Youth career
- –2015: Tchadense

Senior career*
Years	Team	Apps	(Gls)
2016–2017	Tchadense		
2017–2018	Sporting Praia		
2018–2019	Maria da Fonte	30	(3)
2019–2021	Leça	41	(5)
2021–2023	Feirense	56	(4)
2023–2025	Sheriff Tiraspol	34	(4)
2025–2026	Oțelul Galați	20	(1)
2026–	FCSB	29	(4)

International career^{‡}
2019	Cape Verde U19	2	(0)
2021–	Cape Verde	45	(1)
- * Club domestic league appearances and goals as of 22 November 2026 ‡ National team caps and goals as of 13 November 2026

João Paulo Moreira Fernandes (Portuguese: [ʒu.ˈɐ̃w ˈpaw.lu mu.ˈɾej.ɾɐ fɨɾ.ˈnɐ̃.dɨʃ]; born 26 May 1998), commonly known as João Paulo, is a Cape Verdean professional footballer who plays as a midfielder or a left-back for Liga I club FCSB and the Cape Verde national team.

== Club career ==
In June 2025, the player moved to Oțelul Galați from Liga I, signing a two-year contract.

== International career ==
Fernandes was called up to the Cape Verde national team for a pair of friendlies in June 2021. He debuted with the Cape Verde national team in a friendly 2–0 loss to Senegal on 8 June 2021.

On 18 May 2026, he was called up by Cape Verde's head coach Bubista for the 2026 FIFA World Cup.

== Career statistics ==
=== Club ===
As of match played 22 November 2026

Appearances and goals by club, season and competition
Club	Season	League			National cup (Note: Includes Taça de Portugal, Cupa Moldovei, Cupa României)		Continental		Other		Total	
Club	Season	Division	Apps	Goals	Apps	Goals	Apps	Goals	Apps	Goals	Apps	Goals
Tchadense	2017	Campeonato Caboverdiano de Futebol	?	?	?	?	—		—		?	?
Sporting Praia	2018	Campeonato Caboverdiano de Futebol	?	?	?	?	—		—		?	?
Maria da Fonte	2018–19	Campeonato de Portugal	30	3	3	1	—		—		33	4
Leça	2019–20	Campeonato de Portugal	17	3	3	0	—		—		20	3
Leça	2020–21	Campeonato de Portugal	24	2	1	0	—		—		25	2
Leça	Total		41	5	4	0	—		—		45	5
Feirense	2021–22	Liga Portugal 2	24	1	3	0	—		1 (Note: Appearances in Taça da Liga)	0	28	1
Feirense	2022–23	Liga Portugal 2	32	3	1	0	—		3	0	36	3
Feirense	Total		56	4	4	0	—		4	0	64	4
Sheriff Tiraspol	2023–24	Moldovan Super Liga	20	4	3	2	13 (Note: Four appearances in UEFA Champions League, nine appearances in UEFA Europa League)	0	—		36	6
Sheriff Tiraspol	2024–25	Moldovan Super Liga	14	0	3	0	6 (Note: Four appearances in UEFA Europa League, two appearances in UEFA Conference League)	0	—		23	0
Sheriff Tiraspol	Total		34	4	6	2	19	0	—		59	6
Oțelul Galați	2025–26	Liga I	20	1	2	0	—		—		22	1
FCSB	2025–26	Liga I	14	1	1	0	—		2 (Note: Appearances in Liga I European play-offs)	1	17	2
FCSB	2026–27	Liga I	15	3	2	0	1 (Note: Appearances in UEFA Conference League)	1	—		18	4
FCSB	Total		29	4	3	0	1	1	2	1	35	6
Career total			210	21	22	3	20	1	6	1	258	26

=== International ===
As of match played 13 November 2026

Appearances and goals by national team and year
National team	Year	Apps	Goals
Cape Verde	2021	4	0
Cape Verde	2022	3	0
Cape Verde	2023	9	1
Cape Verde	2024	15	0
Cape Verde	2025	7	0
Cape Verde	2026	7	0
Total		45	1

Scores and results list Cape Verde's goal tally first, score column indicates score after each João Paulo goal.

List of international goals scored by João Paulo
No.	Date	Venue	Opponent	Score	Result	Competition
1	18 June 2023	Estádio Nacional de Cabo Verde, Praia, Cape Verde	Burkina Faso	2–0	3–1	2023 Africa Cup of Nations qualification

== Honours ==
Sporting Praia

- Taça Nacional de Cabo Verde: 2018

Sheriff Tiraspol

- Cupa Moldovei: 2024–25
