= Victor Străistari =

Moldovan footballer (born 1999)

Personal information
- Date of birth: 21 June 1999 (age 27)
- Place of birth: Criuleni, Moldova
- Position: Goalkeeper

Youth career
- –2017: Real Succes Chișinău
- 2017–2018: Sheriff Tiraspol

Senior career*
Years	Team	Apps	(Gls)
2018–2019	Petrocub Hîncești	1	(0)
2019–2021	Dinamo-Auto	30	(0)
2021	Dunărea Călărași	0	(0)
2021–2023	CSF Bălți	18	(0)
2023	Sfîntul Gheorghe	9	(0)
2023–2026	Sheriff Tiraspol	1	(0)
2024–2025	→ Dacia Buiucani (loan)	12	(0)
2026	Toktogul	0	(0)

International career^{‡}
2017	Moldova U19	1	(0)
2019–2020	Moldova U21	7	(0)
- * Club domestic league appearances and goals as of 3 March 2026 ‡ National team caps and goals as of 7 April 2021

Victor Străistari (born 21 June 1999) is a Moldovan professional footballer who plays as a goalkeeper.

He has played at youth level for his country with the Moldova U19 and Moldova U21 sides.

== Club career ==
Străistari started playing football for Real Succes Chișinău before joining the Sheriff Tiraspol academy. He made his professional debut as part of Petrocub Hîncești on 10 November 2018, starting in a 1–0 away loss to Dinamo-Auto.

In 2019, Străistari moved to Dinamo-Auto where he experienced his breakthrough. He made 34 appearances through two seasons, including his European debut on 27 August 2020 in a 2–1 away loss to Ventspils in a UEFA Europa League qualifier. In March 2021, Străistari was the subject of interest from Romanian side Universitatea Craiova.

Străistari joined Romanian Liga II club Dunărea Călărași on 21 July 2021, signing a one-year contract. One month later, however, he returned to Moldova, signing with CSF Bălți on 28 August 2021. He made his debut for the club on 11 September in a 1–1 away draw against Milsami.

In May 2023, Străistari was on the books of Sfîntul Gheorghe, playing for the club in the second leg of the 2022–23 Moldovan Cup semi-final defeat against Bălți. On 26 June 2023, Sheriff Tiraspol announced that Străistari had returned to the club. In August 2024 he joined Dacia Buiucani on loan, playing for the club for the duration of Phase I of the season.

== International career ==
Străistari is a Moldovan youth international, and has played for Moldova under-19 and under-21. He made his debut at under-21 level on 11 October 2019 in a 2–1 win over Wales. In 2023 he was called up to the senior team.

== Career statistics ==
As of match played 14 May 2023

Appearances and goals by club, season and competition
Club	Season	League			National cup		Other		Total	
Club	Season	Division	Apps	Goals	Apps	Goals	Apps	Goals	Apps	Goals
Petrocub Hîncești	2018	Divizia Națională	1	0	0	0	—		1	0
Dinamo-Auto	2019	Divizia Națională	11	0	1	0	—		12	0
Dinamo-Auto	2020–21	Divizia Națională	19	0	2	0	1 (Note: Appearance in UEFA Europa League)	0	22	0
Dinamo-Auto	Total		30	0	3	0	1	0	34	0
Dunărea Călărași	2021–22	Liga II	0	0	0	0	—		0	0
CSF Bălți	2021–22	Divizia Națională	9	0	1	0	—		10	0
CSF Bălți	2022–23	Moldovan Super Liga	9	0	0	0	—		9	0
CSF Bălți	Total		18	0	1	0	—		19	0
Sfîntul Gheorghe	2022–23	Moldovan Super Liga	9	0	4	0	—		13	0
Career total			58	0	8	0	1	0	67	0
