= Papa Ndiaga Yade =

Mauritanian footballer (born 2000)

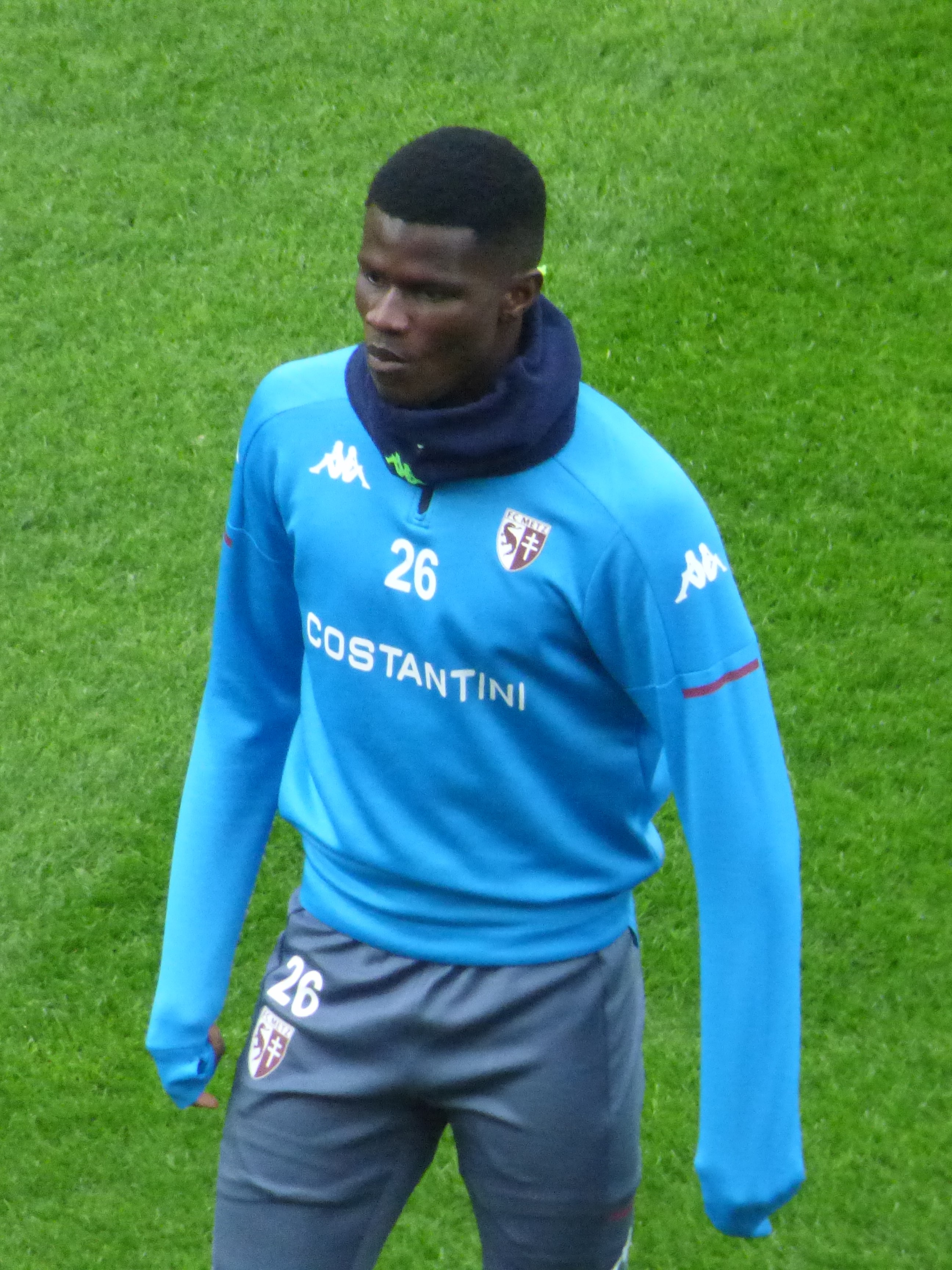
- Yade in 2021 with Metz

Personal information
- Date of birth: 5 January 2000 (age 26)
- Place of birth: Saint-Louis, Senegal
- Height: 1.85 m (6 ft 1 in)
- Position: Winger

Team information
- Current team: LNZ Cherkasy (on loan from Oleksandriya)
- Number: 37

Youth career
- 2016–2019: Génération Foot

Senior career*
Years	Team	Apps	(Gls)
2019–2024	Metz II	13	(6)
2020–2024	Metz	57	(3)
2022–2023	→ Troyes (loan)	14	(0)
2023–2024	→ Quevilly-Rouen (loan)	36	(4)
2024–2025	Sheriff Tiraspol	38	(12)
2026–	Oleksandriya	14	(1)
2026-	LNZ Cherkasy	4	(2)

International career^{‡}
2024–	Mauritania	13	(1)
- * Club domestic league appearances and goals as of 3 October 2026 @ 17:00(AEST) ‡ National team caps and goals as of 20:40, 5 September 2025 (UTC)

Papa Ndiaga Yade (born 5 January 2000) is a professional footballer who plays as a winger for Ukrainian Premier League club Oleksandriya. Born in Senegal, he plays for the Mauritania national team.

== Club career ==
On 15 August 2019, Yade signed a professional contract with Metz for five seasons. He made his professional debut with Metz in a 1–1 (3–4) Coupe de la Ligue penalty shootout loss to Brest on 30 October 2019.

On 25 August 2022, Yade joined Troyes on loan until the end of the 2022–23 season, with an option to buy.

On 27 July 2023, Ligue 2 side Quevilly-Rouen announced the signing of Yade from Metz on a season-long loan.

On 01 July 2024, Yade joined Moldovan Super Liga club Sheriff Tiraspol.

== International career ==
In March 2024, Yade was called up by the Mauritania national team.

=== International goals ===
As of match played 5 September 2025

List of international goals scored by Vakoun Issouf Bayo
No.	Date	Venue	Opponent	Score	Result	Competition
1	5 September 2025	Nouadhibou Municipal Stadium, Nouadhibou, Mauritania	Togo	1–0	2–0	2026 FIFA World Cup qualification
