= Stephen Gopey =

Nigerian footballer

Personal information
- Full name: Stephen Michael Gopey
- Date of birth: 15 January 2000 (age 26)
- Place of birth: Warri, Nigeria
- Height: 1.84 m (6 ft 0 in)
- Position: Forward

Team information
- Current team: Toktogul
- Number: 99

Senior career*
Years	Team	Apps	(Gls)
2019	Lobi Stars	17	(3)
2019–2021	Rivers United	33	(2)
2021	Wikki Tourists	6	(5)
2021–2022	Inhulets Petrove	16	(2)
2022	Al-Arabi	0	(0)
2022–2023	TP Mazembe		
2022	→ Wadi Degla (loan)		
2023	Hong Linh Ha Tinh	9	(1)
2024	Inhulets Petrove	0	(0)
2024–2025	Milsami Orhei	15	(4)
2026–	Toktogul	0	(0)
- * Club domestic league appearances and goals as of 14 March 2026

Stephen Michael Gopey (born 15 January 2000) is a Nigerian professional footballer who plays as a forward for Kyrgyz Premier League club Toktogul.

== Club career ==
In mid-season of the 2020–21 Nigeria Professional Football League, Gopey moved from Rivers United to Wikki Tourists.

On 23 July 2021, he signed for Ukrainian Premier League club Inhulets Petrove, on a three-year contract. Gopey made his league debut against Shakhtar Donetsk on 24 July 2021, scoring his team's lone goal in a 2–1 defeat.
