= Danny Lupano =

Belgian footballer (born 2000)

Personal information
- Full name: Danny Koy Lupano
- Date of birth: 23 August 2000 (age 26)
- Place of birth: Brussels, Belgium
- Height: 1.93 m (6 ft 4 in)
- Position: Centre-back

Team information
- Current team: FK Žalgiris

Youth career
- 2016–2018: Solihull Moors
- 2018–2019: Birmingham City
- 2019–2021: Hull City

Senior career*
Years	Team	Apps	(Gls)
2019	→ Hednesford Town (loan)	0	(0)
2019	Hednesford Town	2	(0)
2020–2021	Hull City	0	(0)
2020	→ Derry City (loan)	4	(0)
2020	→ King's Lynn Town (loan)	4	(0)
2021	→ Derry City (loan)	5	(0)
2021–2023	Kalamata	36	(2)
2023–2024	Virton	4	(1)
2024–2026	Milsami Orhei		
2026–	Žalgiris	10	(1)
- * Club domestic league appearances and goals as of 17 September 2026

Danny Koy Lupano (born 23 August 2000) is a Belgian professional footballer who plays as a centre-back for Moldovan Liga club Milsami Orhei.

== Career ==
At the age of 16, Lupano joined the youth academy of English fifth tier side Solihull Moors. In 2018, he joined the youth academy of Birmingham City in the English second tier. Before the second half of 2018–19, he signed for English seventh tier club Hednesford Town. In 2019, Lupano signed for Hull City in the English second tier after trialing for English Premier League teams Wolverhampton Wanderers and Leicester City.

Before the 2020 season, he was sent on loan to Derry City in Northern Ireland. In 2020, he was sent on loan to English fifth tier outfit King's Lynn Town. Before the 2021 season, Lupano returned on loan to Derry City in Northern Ireland. In 2021, he signed for Greek side Kalamata. On 16 January 2022, he debuted for Kalamata during a 0–0 draw with Levadiakos.

=== FK Žalgiris ===
On 27 May 2026, Lithuanian FK Žalgiris announced the signing of Danny Lupano.
