= Hennos Asmelash =

Dutch football player (born 1999)

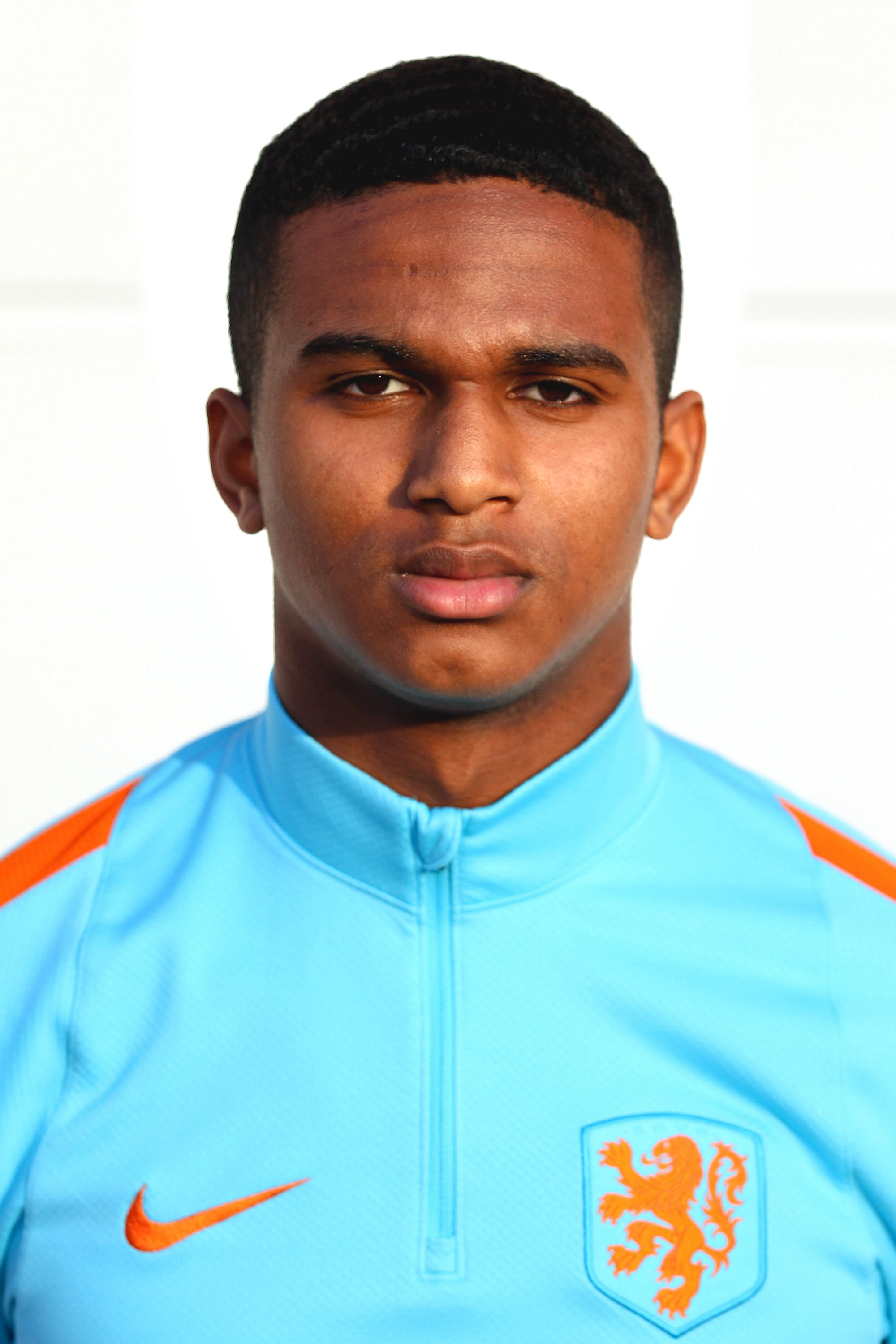
- Asmelash in 2017

Personal information
- Date of birth: 1 July 1999 (age 27)
- Place of birth: Delft, Netherlands
- Height: 1.77 m (5 ft 10 in)
- Position: Right-back

Team information
- Current team: Milsami Orhei
- Number: 29

Youth career
- –2013: SV DSO
- 2013–2017: ADO Den Haag

Senior career*
Years	Team	Apps	(Gls)
2016–2020	ADO Den Haag	3	(0)
2018–2019	→ TOP Oss (loan)	23	(1)
2019–2020	→ TOP Oss (loan)	20	(0)
2021–2022	Inhulets Petrove	14	(0)
2023–2024	Wieczysta Kraków	20	(1)
2024–2025	Scheveningen	15	(1)
2025–	Milsami Orhei	46	(0)

International career^{‡}
2014	Netherlands U16	2	(0)
2016	Netherlands U18	5	(0)
2026–	Eritrea	3	(0)
- * Club domestic league appearances and goals as of 15:14, 9 November 2026 (UTC) ‡ National team caps and goals as of 18:19, 16 November 2026 (UTC)

Hennos Asmelash (Geʽez: ሐንኖስ ኣስመላሽ; born 1 July 1999) is a professional footballer who plays as a right-back for Moldovan Liga club Milsami Orhei. Born in the Netherlands, he represented it on junior levels, before switching allegiance to Eritrea for senior level.

== Club career ==
Asmelash made his professional debut in the Eredivisie for ADO Den Haag on 14 January 2017 in a game against SC Heerenveen. After two loans at TOP Oss, Asmelash was released by ADO and became a free agent on 1 July 2020.

On 1 March 2021, Asmelash signed with Ukrainian Premier League club Inhulets Petrove.

On 3 January 2023, Asmelash joined Polish fourth division side Wieczysta Kraków on a year-and-a-half deal, with an extension option. On 8 June 2024, after Wieczysta won promotion to the II liga, it was announced he would depart the club at the end of his contract.

== International career ==
Asmelash was born in the Netherlands to Eritrean parents. He was a youth international for the Netherlands at the U16 and U18 levels.

On 30 September 2026, Asmelash made his debut for the Eritrea national team in an AFCON qualifier against South Africa.

== Honours ==
Wieczysta Kraków

- III liga, group IV: 2023–24
