= Armel Zohouri =

Ivorian footballer

Personal information
- Full name: Armel Junior Zohouri
- Date of birth: 5 April 2001 (age 25)
- Place of birth: Divo, Ivory Coast
- Height: 1.76 m (5 ft 9 in)
- Position: Right-back

Team information
- Current team: Reims
- Number: 20

Senior career*
Years	Team	Apps	(Gls)
2019–2020	RC Abidjan	20	(1)
2020–2021	Nice	0	(0)
2020–2021	→ Lausanne-Sport (loan)	5	(0)
2021–2022	Lausanne-Sport	24	(0)
2022–2024	Sheriff Tiraspol	37	(1)
2025–2026	Iberia 1999	32	(1)
2026–	Reims	0	(0)

International career^{‡}
2023	Ivory Coast U23	2	(0)
2025–	Ivory Coast	5	(0)
- * Club domestic league appearances and goals as of 23 June 2026 ‡ National team caps and goals as of 31 December 2025

Armel Junior Zohouri (born 5 April 2001) is an Ivorian professional footballer who plays as a right-back for French Ligue 2 club Reims and the Ivory Coast national team.

== Club career ==
Zohouri joined Ligue 1 club Nice on 16 September 2020.

Zohouri joined Lausanne-Sport on loan on 30 September 2020. He made his professional debut with the club in a 2–1 Swiss Super League loss to Basel on 25 November 2020. At the end of the season, Lausanne-Sport signed Zohouri on a permanent basis.

Zohouri joined Moldovan club Sheriff Tiraspol on 27 August 2022. After initialling leaving Sheriff in January 2025 after his contract had expired, Zohouri signed a new contract with Sheriff on 24 February 2025.

On 17 July 2026, Zohouri signed a three-year contract with Reims in French Ligue 2.

== International career ==
Zohouri was called up to the Ivory Coast U23s on 16 March 2023. He played his first national match on 22 March 2023 against Morocco U23.
