= Emil Velić =

Slovenian footballer

Personal information
- Date of birth: 6 February 1995 (age 31)
- Place of birth: Ljubljana, Slovenia
- Height: 1.90 m (6 ft 3 in)
- Position: Goalkeeper

Team information
- Current team: Velež Mostar
- Number: 95

Youth career
- –2015: Domžale

Senior career*
Years	Team	Apps	(Gls)
2015–2017	Sint-Truiden	1	(0)
2017–2020	Mladost Doboj Kakanj	71	(0)
2020–2021	Xanthi	0	(0)
2021	→ Mladost Doboj Kakanj (loan)	13	(0)
2021–2025	Radomlje	86	(0)
2025–2026	Sheriff Tiraspol	5	(0)
2026–	Velež Mostar	6	(0)
- * Club domestic league appearances and goals as of 6 September 2026

Emil Velić (born 6 February 1995) is a Slovenian professional footballer who plays as a goalkeeper for Bosnian Premier League club Velež Mostar.

He started off his career at Slovenian club Domžale, before signing a contract with Belgian club Sint-Truiden in 2015. In January 2017, Velić joined Bosnian club Mladost Doboj Kakanj. He left Mladost in June 2020.

== Career ==
=== Early career ===
Velić started playing football in the youth team of Slovenian club Domžale, who he left in July 2015 after joining and signing his first professional contract with Belgian First Division A club Sint-Truiden. He made one appearance for Sint-Truiden in the 2015–16 season.

=== Mladost Doboj Kakanj ===
Velić left Sint-Truiden in January 2017 and shortly after, on 22 January, signed a six-month contract with newly promoted Bosnian Premier League club Mladost Doboj Kakanj. He made his debut for Mladost on 25 February 2017, in the club's 3–1 home league win against Sloboda Tuzla. After showing himself as a good signing, the club decided to extended Velić's contract on 22 August 2017. On 20 July 2018, he once again extended his contract with the club until June 2020.

On 18 June 2020, Velić left Mladost after his contract with the club expired, three and a half years after joining them. In total, during that period, he played over 70 matches for Mladost and was one of the most important and best players in the team, being one of the key players that kept Mladost up in the Premier League. He was also regarded as one of the best Premier League goalkeepers during those seasons.

=== Sheriff ===
On 24 January 2025, Velić signed with Sheriff Tiraspol in Moldova.

== Career statistics ==
=== Club ===
As of match played 6 September 2026

Appearances and goals by club, season and competition
Club	Season	League			National cup (Note: Includes Bosnian Cup, Slovenian Cup)		Total	
Club	Season	Division	Apps	Goals	Apps	Goals	Apps	Goals
Sint-Truidense	2015–16	Belgian First Division A	1	0	0	0	1	0
Sint-Truidense	2016–17	Belgian First Division A	0	0	0	0	0	0
Sint-Truidense	Total		1	0	0	0	1	0
Mladost Doboj Kakanj	2016–17	Bosnian Premier League	11	0	2	0	13	0
Mladost Doboj Kakanj	2017–18	Bosnian Premier League	23	0	2	0	25	0
Mladost Doboj Kakanj	2018–19	Bosnian Premier League	28	0	0	0	28	0
Mladost Doboj Kakanj	2019–20	Bosnian Premier League	9	0	2	0	11	0
Mladost Doboj Kakanj (loan)	2020–21	Bosnian Premier League	13	0	—		13	0
Mladost Doboj Kakanj (loan)	Total		84	0	6	0	90	0
Radomlje	2021–22	Slovenian PrvaLiga	20	0	—		20	0
Radomlje	2022–23	Slovenian PrvaLiga	32	0	—		32	0
Radomlje	2023–24	Slovenian PrvaLiga	19	0	1	0	20	0
Radomlje	2024–25	Slovenian PrvaLiga	15	0	0	0	15	0
Radomlje	Total		86	0	1	0	87	0
Sheriff Tiraspol	2024–25	Moldovan Liga	5	0	0	0	5	0
Sheriff Tiraspol	2025–26	Moldovan Liga	0	0	0	0	0	0
Sheriff Tiraspol	Total		5	0	0	0	5	0
Velež Mostar	2026–27	Bosnian Premier League	6	0	0	0	6	0
Career total			182	0	7	0	189	0
