= Aleksa Marušić =

Montenegrin footballer (born 1999)

Personal information
- Date of birth: 8 June 1999 (age 27)
- Place of birth: Nikšić, Montenegro
- Height: 1.88 m (6 ft 2 in)
- Position: Striker

Team information
- Current team: Radnički 1923
- Number: 26

Senior career*
Years	Team	Apps	(Gls)
–2021	Sutjeska	73	(7)
2022	Dečić	20	(7)
2022	Mladost GAT	10	(1)
2023	Dečić	12	(0)
2023–2024	Voska Sport	32	(17)
2024–	1. FC Magdeburg	3	(0)
2024–2026	1. FC Magdeburg II	21	(5)
2025	→ Sheriff Tiraspol (loan)	10	(4)
2026–	Radnički 1923	0	(0)

International career^{‡}
2015–2016	Montenegro U17	12	(1)
2017–2018	Montenegro U19	5	(0)
2018–2019	Montenegro U21	3	(0)
- * Club domestic league appearances and goals as of 30 June 2026 ‡ National team caps and goals as of 10 September 2019

Aleksa Marušić (born 8 June 1999) is a Montenegrin professional footballer who plays as a Striker for Serbian SuperLiga club Radnički 1923.

== Club career ==
Marušić started his career with Montenegrin side Sutjeska, where he suffered a broken nose while playing for the club and helped them win two league titles. In 2022, he signed for Montenegrin side Dečić. The same year, he signed for Serbian side Mladost GAT before returning to Montenegrin side Dečić in 2023.

During the summer of 2023, he signed for Macedonian side Voska Sport, where he was top scorer of the 2023–24 Macedonian First Football League with seventeen goals and helped the club reach the final of the 2023–24 Macedonian Football Cup. Following his stint there, he signed for German side 1. FC Magdeburg on 22 July 2024. Subsequently, he was sent on loan to Moldovan side Sheriff on 12 February 2025. On 9 March 2025, he debuted and scored his first goal for the club during a 3–0 home win over Spartanii Sportul.

Following his loan spell, Marušić returned to 1. FC Magdeburg, where he played for the club's reserve team in the 2025–26 season, making 20 appearances and scoring five goals in the Regionalliga Nordost. He subsequently left the club and joined Serbian side FK Radnički Niš.
