= 2025–26 FC Sheriff Tiraspol season =

Sheriff Tiraspol
2025–26 season
- Chairman: Viktor Gushan
- Manager: Victor Mihailov (Interim) (until 3 September); Vadim Skripchenko (3 September-5 November); Victor Mihailov (Interim) (from 5 November)
- Stadium: Sheriff Stadium
- Super Liga: 2nd
- Moldovan Cup: Champions
- UEFA Europa League: Second qualifying round vs Utrecht
- UEFA Conference League: Third qualifying round vs Anderlecht
- Top goalscorer: League: Amarildo Gjoni (7); All: Amarildo Gjoni (9); Jayder Asprilla (9)
- Highest home attendance: 6,223 vs Prishtina (10 July 2025)
- Lowest home attendance: 814 vs Spartanii Sportul (19 October 2025)
- Average home league attendance: 2,069 (10 May 2026)
Home colours	Away colours

The 2025–26 season was FC Sheriff Tiraspol's 29th season, and their 28th in the Moldovan Super Liga, the top-flight of Moldovan football.

== Season events ==
On 10 June, Sheriff announced the singing of Mollo Bessala on loan from LNZ Cherkasy.

On 11 June, Sheriff announced the singing of Ibrahima Soumah from Zimbru Chișinău.

On 20 June, Sheriff announced the singing of Fernando Neto from Gomel, Átila from Arsenal Dzerzhinsk and Amarildo Gjoni from Elbasani.

On 23 June, Sheriff announced the singing of Ivan Dyulgerov from CSKA Sofia.

On 25 June, Sheriff announced that Vladimer Mamuchashvili was leaving the club to sign for Torpedo Kutaisi.

On 1 July, Sheriff announced the singing of Mamady Diarra from Győri ETO, and the departures of Moussa Kyabou, Rasheed Akanbi, João Paulo Fernandes and Rashed Al-Tumi.

On 9 July, Sheriff announced the singing of Abdoulaye Diarra from AS Bakaridjan.

On 18 July, Sheriff announced the singing of Daba Diakité from Djoliba AC.

On 16 August, Sheriff announced that Artur Serobyan had left the club after his loan deal from Ararat-Armenia had been ended by mutual agreement.

On 21 August, Sheriff announced the signing of Qays Ghanem from Maccabi Bnei Reineh.

On 1 September, Sheriff announced the signing of Jójó from Vizela, and that Elijah Odede had left the club to sign for Troyes.

On 2 September, Sheriff announced the loan signing of Liam Hermesh from Maccabi Haifa until the end of the season.

On 3 September, Sheriff announced the appointment of Vadim Skripchenko as their new head coach.

On 8 September, Sheriff announced the signing of Baye Assane Ciss from Teungueth.

On 9 September, Sheriff announced the signing of Riis Opoku Twumasi from Aduana.

On 5 November, Sheriff announced the departure of Vadim Skripchenko as their head coach.

On 12 January, when announcing the friendly matches for their winter training camp, Sheriff announced that Johan Rodallega, Cyrille Bayala, Abdoulaye Diarra, Jójó and Daba Diakité had all left the club.

On 13 January, Sheriff announced the singing of Zé Flores from Bălți.

On 14 January, Sheriff announced the singing of Emil Tîmbur from Milsami Orhei.

On 19 January, Sheriff announced the singing of Mahmoud Ghorbel on loan from US Monastir.

On 23 January, Sheriff announced the singing of Jayder Asprilla from Atlético Nacional.

On 2 February, Sheriff announced the signing of Dhoraso Klas from Iberia 1999.

On 3 February, Sheriff announced that Amarildo Gjoni had left the club in order to sign for Puszcza Niepołomice.

On 12 February, Sheriff announced that Victor Străistari had left the club.

On 13 February, Sheriff announced the signings of Vsevolod Nihaev from Dacia Buiucani and Daniel Danu from CSM Olimpia Satu Mare.

On 16 February, Sheriff announced the singing of Emmanuel Afetse from Progen.

On 19 February, Sheriff announced the singing of Bourama Fomba from Omonia Aradippou.

On 20 February, Sheriff announced the singing of Nicolae Cebotari from Zimbru Chișinău.

On 16 February, Sheriff announced the singing of Sapata from RWDM Brussels.

On 7 March, Sheriff announced the singing of Eguedegue Magloire from Vitebsk.

On 12 March, Sheriff announced the signing of Marcelino Carreazo who'd most recently played for Apollon Limassol.

== Squad ==
As of match played 23 May 2026

No.	Name	Nationality	Position	Date of birth (age)	Signed from	Signed in	Contract ends	Apps.	Goals
Goalkeepers
1	Emil Tîmbur	(Moldova)	GK	21 July 1997 (age 29)	Milsami Orhei	2026		12	0
12	Renat Josan	(Moldova)	GK	13 May 2007 (age 19)	Academy	2025		0	0
21	Ivan Dyulgerov	(Bulgaria)	GK	15 July 1999 (age 27)	CSKA Sofia	2025		16	0
25	Serghei Obiscalov	(Moldova)	GK	19 July 2006 (age 20)	Academy	2024		0	0
28	Nicolae Cebotari	(Moldova)	GK	24 May 1997 (age 29)	Zimbru Chișinău	2026		5	0
Defenders
2	Átila	(Brazil)	DF	24 February 2002 (age 24)	Arsenal Dzerzhinsk	2025		10	0
4	Natus Jamel Swen	(Liberia)	DF	18 November 2004 (age 21)	Mġarr United	2025		21	0
6	Raí	(Brazil)	DF	28 March 2000 (age 26)	Dinamo Minsk	2025		58	3
7	Mahmoud Ghorbel	(Tunisia)	DF	31 December 2003 (age 22)	on loan from US Monastir	2026		9	0
18	Eguedegue Magloire	(Cameroon)	DF	3 January 2006 (age 20)	Vitebsk	2025		4	0
20	Riis Opoku Twumasi	(Ghana)	DF	25 January 2006 (age 20)	Aduana	2025		13	0
24	Danila Forov	(Moldova)	DF	7 January 2004 (age 22)	HNK Rijeka	2023		45	5
29	Soumaïla Magossouba	(Mali)	DF	28 June 2004 (age 22)	Stade Malien	2025		42	2
35	Bourama Fomba	(Mali)	DF	10 July 1999 (age 27)	Omonia Aradippou	2026		15	2
44	Alesio Mija	(Albania)	DF	20 June 2001 (age 25)	Dinamo City	2024		44	4
45	Baye Assane Ciss	(Senegal)	DF	10 October 2003 (age 22)	Teungueth	2025		24	0
Midfielders
3	Liam Hermesh	(Israel)	MF	12 March 2004 (age 22)	on loan from Maccabi Haifa	2025	2026	17	1
8	Ibrahima Soumah	(Guinea)	MF	12 September 2003 (age 23)	Zimbru Chișinău	2025		30	1
13	Marcelino Carreazo	(Colombia)	MF	17 December 1999 (age 26)	Unattached	2026		2	0
16	Daniel Danu	(Moldova)	MF	26 August 2002 (age 24)	CSM Olimpia Satu Mare	2026		9	0
17	Vsevolod Nihaev	(Moldova)	MF	4 May 1999 (age 27)	Dacia Buiucani	2026		9	1
26	Dhoraso Klas	(Suriname)	MF	30 January 2001 (age 25)	Iberia 1999	2026		15	1
32	Emmanuel Afetse	(Ghana)	MF	9 March 2007 (age 19)	Progen	2026		3	0
33	Mihail Corotcov	(Moldova)	MF	24 July 2008 (age 18)	Academy	2025		8	0
69	Peter Ademo	(Nigeria)	MF	11 January 2003 (age 23)	DFK Dainava	2024		75	9
Forwards
10	Zé Flores	(Brazil)	FW	20 May 1999 (age 27)	Bălți	2026		15	3
11	Sapata	(Brazil)	FW	26 March 2003 (age 23)	RWDM Brussels	2026		15	1
14	Qays Ghanem	(Israel)	FW	31 December 1997 (age 28)	Maccabi Bnei Reineh	2025		18	3
19	Jayder Asprilla	(Colombia)	FW	20 March 2003 (age 23)	Atlético Nacional	2026		14	9
22	Mollo Bessala	(Cameroon)	FW	10 October 2003 (age 22)	on loan from LNZ Cherkasy	2025	2026	14	1
42	Konan Loukou	(Ivory Coast)	FW	15 June 2005 (age 21)	Issia Wazy	2023		47	5
Out on loan
26	Artiom Dijinari	(Moldova)	DF	26 October 2005 (age 20)	Academy	2022		4	0
27	Vyacheslav Kozma	(Moldova)	FW	3 February 2005 (age 21)	Academy	2024		17	4
31	Dan-Angelo Botan	(Moldova)	FW	19 February 2005 (age 21)	Academy	2023		7	0
70	Luis Phelipe	(Brazil)	FW	12 February 2001 (age 25)	Unattached	2025		18	2
	Danila Ignatov	(Moldova)	DF	19 June 2001 (age 25)	Academy	2020		4	1
	Roman Novicov	(Moldova)	MF	23 April 2003 (age 23)	Academy	2023		1	0
Left during the season
1	Victor Străistari	(Moldova)	GK	21 June 1999 (age 27)	Sfîntul Gheorghe	2023		24	0
3	Nana Kwame Boakye	(Ghana)	DF	18 August 1997 (age 29)	Nations	2024		51	3
7	Jójó	(Cape Verde)	DF	19 May 2001 (age 25)	on loan from Vizela	2025		5	0
7	Abou Ouattara	(Burkina Faso)	FW	25 December 1999 (age 26)	Valenciennes	2022		32	4
7	Fernando Neto	(Brazil)	MF	18 June 2003 (age 23)	Gomel	2025		4	0
9	Amarildo Gjoni	(Albania)	FW	25 July 1999 (age 27)	Elbasani	2025		22	9
10	Artur Serobyan	(Armenia)	FW	2 July 2003 (age 23)	on loan from Ararat-Armenia	2025	2025	25	4
11	Cyrille Bayala	(Burkina Faso)	FW	24 May 1996 (age 30)	AC Ajaccio	2024		84	18
12	Elijah Odede	(Nigeria)	FW	12 January 2007 (age 19)	Unattached	2025		26	9
15	Abdoulaye Diarra	(Mali)	FW	6 January 2006 (age 20)	AS Bakaridjan	2025		9	2
16	Rashed Al-Tumi	(Malta)	GK	4 October 2000 (age 25)	Sliema Wanderers	2024		6	0
17	Johan Rodallega	(Colombia)	MF	24 April 2005 (age 21)	on loan from Millonarios	2025		1	0
18	Daba Diakité	(Mali)	MF	23 April 2004 (age 22)	Djoliba AC	2025		1	0
18	Moussa Kyabou	(Mali)	MF	18 April 1998 (age 28)	USC Kita	2021		99	0
28	Emil Velić	(Slovenia)	GK	6 February 1995 (age 31)	NK Radomlje	2024		5	0
61	Rasheed Akanbi	(Nigeria)	FW	9 May 1999 (age 27)	Kocaelispor	2022		83	31
71	Vladimer Mamuchashvili	(Georgia (country))	MF	29 August 1997 (age 29)	Dinamo Batumi	2024		24	10
77	Mamady Diarra	(Mali)	FW	26 June 2000 (age 26)	Győri ETO	2025		19	4
88	João Paulo Fernandes	(Cape Verde)	MF	26 May 1998 (age 28)	Feirense	2023		59	6
90	Papa Ndiaga Yade	(Mauritania)	FW	5 January 2000 (age 26)	Metz	2024		52	15

== Transfers ==
=== In ===
Date	Position	Nationality	Name	From	Fee	Ref.
11 June 2025	MF	(Guinea)	Ibrahima Soumah	Zimbru Chișinău	Undisclosed	
20 June 2025	MF	(Brazil)	Fernando Neto	Gomel	Undisclosed	
20 June 2025	DF	(Brazil)	Átila	Arsenal Dzerzhinsk	Undisclosed	
20 June 2025	FW	(Albania)	Amarildo Gjoni	Elbasani	Undisclosed	
23 June 2025	GK	(Bulgaria)	Ivan Dyulgerov	CSKA Sofia	Undisclosed	
1 July 2025	FW	(Mali)	Mamady Diarra	Győri ETO	Undisclosed	
9 July 2025	FW	(Mali)	Abdoulaye Diarra	AS Bakaridjan	Undisclosed	
18 July 2025	MF	(Mali)	Daba Diakité	Djoliba AC	Undisclosed	
21 August 2025	FW	(Israel)	Qays Ghanem	Maccabi Bnei Reineh	Undisclosed	
8 September 2025	DF	(Senegal)	Baye Assane Ciss	Teungueth	Undisclosed	
9 September 2025	DF	(Ghana)	Riis Opoku Twumasi	Aduana	Undisclosed	
13 January 2026	FW	(Brazil)	Zé Flores	Bălți	Undisclosed	
14 January 2026	GK	(Moldova)	Emil Tîmbur	Milsami Orhei	Undisclosed	
23 January 2026	FW	(Colombia)	Jayder Asprilla	Atlético Nacional	Undisclosed	
2 February 2026	MF	(Suriname)	Dhoraso Klas	Iberia 1999	Undisclosed	
13 February 2026	MF	(Moldova)	Daniel Danu	CSM Olimpia Satu Mare	Undisclosed	
13 February 2026	MF	(Moldova)	Vsevolod Nihaev	Dacia Buiucani	Undisclosed	
16 February 2026	MF	(Ghana)	Emmanuel Afetse	Progen	Undisclosed	
19 February 2026	DF	(Mali)	Bourama Fomba	Omonia Aradippou	Undisclosed	
20 February 2026	GK	(Moldova)	Nicolae Cebotari	Zimbru Chișinău	Undisclosed	
28 February 2026	FW	(Brazil)	Sapata	RWDM Brussels	Undisclosed	
7 March 2026	DF	(Cameroon)	Eguedegue Magloire	Vitebsk	Undisclosed	
12 March 2026	MF	(Colombia)	Marcelino Carreazo	Unattached	Free	

=== Loans in ===
Date from	Position	Nationality	Name	From	Date to	Ref.
14 January 2025	FW	(Armenia)	Artur Serobyan	Ararat-Armenia	16 August 2025	
27 February 2025	MF	(Colombia)	Johan Rodallega	Millonarios	31 December 2025	
10 June 2025	FW	(Cameroon)	Mollo Bessala	LNZ Cherkasy	30 June 2026	
1 September 2025	DF	(Cape Verde)	Jójó	Vizela	31 December 2025	
2 September 2025	MF	(Israel)	Liam Hermesh	Maccabi Haifa	30 June 2026	
19 January 2025	DF	(Tunisia)	Mahmoud Ghorbel	US Monastir	30 June 2026	

=== Out ===
Date	Position	Nationality	Name	To	Fee	Ref.
20 June 2025	GK	(Moldova)	Roman Dumenco	Dacia Buiucani	Undisclosed	
25 June 2025	MF	(Georgia (country))	Vladimer Mamuchashvili	Torpedo Kutaisi	Undisclosed	
29 August 2025	DF	(Ghana)	Nana Kwame Boakye	Brann	Undisclosed	
24 August 2025	MF	(Brazil)	Fernando Neto	Varnsdorf	Undisclosed	
1 September 2025	FW	(Nigeria)	Elijah Odede	Troyes	Undisclosed	
22 January 2026	FW	(Mali)	Mamady Diarra	Hapoel Petah Tikva	Free	
3 February 2026	FW	(Albania)	Amarildo Gjoni	Puszcza Niepołomice	Undisclosed	

=== Loans out ===
Date from	Position	Nationality	Name	To	Date to	Ref.
8 July 2025	DF	(Moldova)	Artiom Dijinari	Politehnica UTM	31 December 2025	
30 January 2026	FW	(Brazil)	Luis Phelipe	Ponte Preta	30 June 2026	
3 March 2026	DF	(Moldova)	Artiom Dijinari	Dacia Buiucani	30 June 2026	
3 March 2026	DF	(Moldova)	Vyacheslav Kozma	Dacia Buiucani	30 June 2026	

=== Released ===
Date	Position	Nationality	Name	Joined	Date	Ref.
17 June 2025	DF	(Ivory Coast)	Armel Zohouri	Iberia 1999	17 June 2025	
20 June 2025	DF	(Ivory Coast)	Jocelin Behiratche	Oleksandriya	7 July 2025	
20 June 2025	DF	(Brazil)	Matheus Lins	Port FC		
20 June 2025	MF	(Nigeria)	Gideon Uche Goodlad	Icon Allah FA		
1 July 2025	GK	(Malta)	Rashed Al-Tumi	Sliema Wanderers	11 July 2025	
1 July 2025	MF	(Cape Verde)	João Paulo Fernandes	Oțelul Galați	1 July 2025	
1 July 2025	MF	(Mali)	Moussa Kyabou	Gençlerbirliği	5 July 2025	
1 July 2025	FW	(Burkina Faso)	Abou Ouattara	Džiugas Telšiai	18 March 2026	
1 July 2025	FW	(Nigeria)	Rasheed Akanbi	Boluspor	14 July 2025	
12 January 2026	MF	(Mali)	Daba Diakité			
12 January 2026	FW	(Burkina Faso)	Cyrille Bayala	Dalian K'un City		
12 January 2026	FW	(Mali)	Abdoulaye Diarra			
8 February 2026	FW	(Mauritania)	Papa Ndiaga Yade	Oleksandriya		
12 February 2026	GK	(Moldova)	Victor Străistari	Toktogul		
20 February 2026	GK	(Slovenia)	Emil Velić			
30 June 2026	DF	(Albania)	Alesio Mija			
30 June 2026	DF	(Brazil)	Átila	Gandzasar	29 July 2026	
30 June 2026	DF	(Cameroon)	Eguedegue Magloire			
30 June 2026	DF	(Ghana)	Riis Opoku Twumasi			
30 June 2026	MF	(Mali)	Ibrahima Soumah	Maccabi Petah Tikva		
30 June 2026	MF	(Colombia)	Marcelino Carreazo	Kalamata		
30 June 2026	MF	(Nigeria)	Peter Ademo	Real Zaragoza		
30 June 2026	FW	(Israel)	Qays Ghanem	Ironi Tiberias		

== Friendlies ==
11 June 2025	Sheriff Tiraspol	8–2	Spartanii Sportul	Tiraspol
EEST (UTC+3)	Odede; Swen; Bayala; Raí; Trialist; Trialist; Trialist; Trialist	Report	Goal	Stadium: Sheriff Arena
Note: Match played behind closed doors.

14 June 2025	Sheriff Tiraspol	1–1	Dacia Buiucani	Tiraspol
EEST (UTC+3)	Mamuchashvili	Report	Goal Penalty missed	Stadium: Sheriff Arena
Note: Match played behind closed doors.

6 September 2025	Sheriff Tiraspol	5–0	Dacia Buiucani	Tiraspol
EEST (UTC+3)	Magossouba; Ghanem (yellow card); Phelipe; A.Diarra; Bessala	Report		Stadium: Sheriff Arena
Note: Match originally scheduled to be play against Politehnica Iași.

11 October 2025	Sheriff Tiraspol	3–0	Politehnica Iași	Tiraspol
EEST (UTC+3)	Bayala; Gjoni	Report		Stadium: Sheriff Arena

16 November 2025	Sheriff Tiraspol	6–0	Spartanii Sportul	Tiraspol
EET (UTC+2)	Goal	Report		Stadium: Sheriff Arena
Note: Match played behind closed doors.

23 January 2026	Sheriff Tiraspol	1–1	Zimbru Chișinău	Tiraspol
EET (UTC+2)		Report		Stadium: Sheriff Arena

23 January 2026	Sheriff Tiraspol	2–0	Zimbru Chișinău	Tiraspol
EET (UTC+2)		Report		Stadium: Sheriff Arena

28 January 2026	Sheriff Tiraspol	2–0	Politehnica UTM Chișinău	Tiraspol
EET (UTC+2)		Report		Stadium: Sheriff Arena

31 January 2026	Sheriff Tiraspol	1–1	Bălți	Tiraspol
EET (UTC+2)	Asprilla	Report	Goal	Stadium: Sheriff Arena

7 February 2026	Sheriff Tiraspol	3–0	Politehnica Iași	Tiraspol
EET (UTC+2)	Asprilla; Loukou; Raí	Report		Stadium: Sheriff Arena

14 February 2026	Sheriff Tiraspol	7–0	Petrus Flo	Tiraspol
EET (UTC+2)	Twumasi; Hermesh; Asprilla; Loukou; Ademo; Afetse; Trialist	Report		Stadium: Sheriff Arena

21 February 2026	Sheriff Tiraspol	4–0	Vaslui	Tiraspol
EET (UTC+2)	Asprilla; Loukou; Fomba	Report		Stadium: Sheriff Arena

21 February 2026	Sheriff Tiraspol	1–0	Florești	Tiraspol
EET (UTC+2)	Twumasi	Report		Stadium: Sheriff Arena

28 March 2026	Sheriff Tiraspol	2–0	Spartanii Sportul	Tiraspol
EET (UTC+2)	Asprilla; Magossouba	Report	Goal	Stadium: Sheriff Arena

== Competitions ==
=== Overall record ===
Competition	First match	Last match	Starting round	Final position	Record							
Competition	First match	Last match	Starting round	Final position	Pld	W	D	L	GF	GA	GD	Win %
Super Liga	22 June 2025	17 May 2026	Matchday 1	2nd	31	20	4	7	57	22	+35	64.52
Moldovan Cup	29 October 2025	23 May 2026	Round of 16	Winners	6	5	0	1	15	2	+13	83.33
UEFA Europa League	10 July 2025	31 July 2025	First qualifying round	Second qualifying round	4	1	0	3	7	9	−2	25.00
UEFA Conference League	7 August 2025	14 August 2025	Third qualifying round	Third qualifying round	2	0	1	1	1	4	−3	0.00
Total					43	26	5	12	80	37	+43	60.47

Last updated: 23 May 2026
Source: Competitions

=== Super Liga ===
==== Phase I ====
===== League table =====
Pos	Team	Pld	W	D	L	GF	GA	GD	Pts	Qualification or relegation
1	Petrocub Hîncești	21	14	6	1	44	14	+30	48	Qualification to Phase II
2	Zimbru Chișinău	21	13	5	3	52	21	+31	44	Qualification to Phase II
3	Sheriff Tiraspol	21	13	2	6	43	17	+26	41	Qualification to Phase II
4	Milsami Orhei	21	11	4	6	42	25	+17	37	Qualification to Phase II
5	Bălți	21	8	5	8	27	29	−2	29	Qualification to Phase II

Source: FMF, UEFA, Soccerway
Rules for classification: 1) Points; 2) Head-to-head points; 3) Head-to-head goal difference; 4) Head-to-head goals scored; 5) Matches won; 6) Goal difference; 7) Goals scored; 8) Least red cards; 9) Least yellow cards.

===== Results summary =====
Overall								Home						Away					
Pld	W	D	L	GF	GA	GD	Pts	W	D	L	GF	GA	GD	W	D	L	GF	GA	GD
21	13	2	6	40	17	+23	41	6	1	3	21	8	+13	7	1	3	19	9	+10

Last updated: 30 November 2025.
Source: FMF

===== Results =====
22 June 2025 1	Politehnica Chișinău	0–4	Sheriff Tiraspol	Chișinău
18:00 EEST (UTC+3)	Lipcan (yellow card) 35'	Report	Yade 25'; Mamuchashvili 44', 56'; Mija (yellow card) 72'; Kozma 90'	Stadium: Sport Complex UTM; Attendance: 300; Referee: Viktor Bugenko

29 June 2025 2	Sheriff Tiraspol	5–1	Spartanii Sportul	Tiraspol
18:00 EEST (UTC+3)	Gjoni 3', 33'; Bayala 18'; Swen (yellow card) 25'; Odede 68', 73'	Report	Olaniyan (yellow card) 28' (goal) 80'; Harb (yellow card) 71'	Stadium: Sheriff Arena; Attendance: 3,167; Referee: Andrei Breguța

5 July 2025 3	Milsami Orhei	1–2	Sheriff Tiraspol	Orhei
20:00 EEST (UTC+3)	Gînsari 12' (pen.); Jardan (yellow card) 16'; Nwaeze (red card) 24'; Lisu (yellow card) 80'	Report	Dyulgerov (yellow card) 11'; Gjoni (yellow card) 35' (goal) 41'; Serobyan 52'; Soumah (yellow card) 55'	Stadium: CSR Orhei; Attendance: 1,800; Referee: Viktor Bugenko

13 July 2025 4	Sheriff Tiraspol	1–0	Bălți	Tiraspol
20:00 EEST (UTC+3)	Gjoni 12'; Magossouba (yellow card) 58'	Report	Rogac (yellow card) 55'; Boico (yellow card) 66'; Rusnac (yellow card) 76'	Stadium: Sheriff Arena; Attendance: 1,470; Referee: Ion Orlic

20 July 2025 5	Petrocub Hîncești	0–0	Sheriff Tiraspol	Hîncești
20:00 EEST (UTC+3)	Pușcaș (yellow card) 67'	Report	Soumah (yellow card) 73'	Stadium: Municipal Stadium; Attendance: 1,250; Referee: Andrei Cojocaru

27 July 2025 6	Sheriff Tiraspol	2–3	Zimbru Chișinău	Tiraspol
20:00 EEST (UTC+3)	Gjoni 25' (yellow card) 89'; Loukou (yellow card) 66'; Soumah (yellow card) 68'; Ademo (yellow card) 89'; Kozma 90+1'	Report	Stînă 8'; Shchebetun 42', 70'; Agachi (yellow card) 90+3'	Stadium: Sheriff Arena; Attendance: 3,400; Referee: Roman Jitari

3 August 2025 7	Dacia Buiucani	0–2	Sheriff Tiraspol	Nisporeni
20:00 EEST (UTC+3)	Suruceanu (red card) 45+3'; Focșa (yellow card) 56'; Lambarschi (yellow card) 80'; Nihaev (yellow card) 90'; Dumbrava (yellow card) 90+2'	Report	Bayala (yellow card) 56'; Loukou 76'; Ademo (yellow card) 80'; A.Diarra 88'	Stadium: Central Stadium; Attendance: 600; Referee: Denis Ivlev

10 August 2025 8	Sheriff Tiraspol	3–0	Politehnica UTM Chișinău	Tiraspol
19:00 EEST (UTC+3)	Gjoni 12' (yellow card) 39' (yellow-red card) 42'; Raí (yellow card) 15'; Odede 17'; Magossouba 45' (yellow card) 47'	Report	Mardari (yellow card) 44'	Stadium: Sheriff Arena; Attendance: 1,614; Referee: Andrei Ceban

17 August 2025 9	Spartanii Sportul	0–3	Sheriff Tiraspol	Suruceni
18:00 EEST (UTC+3)	Nazari (yellow card) 80'; Leuca (yellow card) 86'	Report	Raí (yellow card) 13'; M.Diarra 26'; Odede 71'; Bayala 87'	Stadium: Suruceni Stadium; Attendance: 105; Referee: Ion Orlic

24 August 2025 10	Sheriff Tiraspol	1–1	Milsami Orhei	Tiraspol
20:00 EEST (UTC+3)	Ademo 18'; Boakye (yellow card) 25'; A.Diarra (yellow card) 64'	Report	Nwaeze 24' (yellow card) 35'; Jardan (yellow card) 81'; Yoda (yellow card) 86'; Khali (yellow card) 88'	Stadium: Sheriff Arena; Attendance: 4,016; Referee: Viktor Bugenko

31 August 2025 11	Bălți	0–3	Sheriff Tiraspol	Bălți
18:00 EEST (UTC+3)	Ze Flores (yellow card) 22'; Urvanțev (yellow card) 61'	Report	Phelipe (yellow card) 24'; Ghanem 25' (yellow card) 62'; Mija (yellow card) 37'; Bayala (yellow card) 52'; Loukou 69'; Yade 88'	Stadium: Stadionul Orășenesc; Attendance: 2,428; Referee: Denis Ivlev

14 September 2025 12	Sheriff Tiraspol	2–0	Petrocub Hîncești	Tiraspol
19:00 EEST (UTC+3)	Ghanem 18' (yellow card) 39'; Magossouba 22'; Dyulgerov (yellow card) 75'; Phelipe (yellow card) 90+4'	Report	Plătică (yellow card) 59'; Dijinari (yellow card) 90'; Popescu (yellow card) 90+4'; Cucoș (yellow card) 90+4'	Stadium: Sheriff Arena; Attendance: 3,846; Referee: Andrei Cojocaru

21 September 2025 13	Zimbru Chișinău	2–0	Sheriff Tiraspol	Chișinău
19:00 EEST (UTC+3)	Kozlovskiy 9'; Dosso (yellow card) 23'; Amoroso (yellow card) 53'; Fratea 56'	Report		Stadium: Zimbru Stadium; Attendance: 1,570; Referee: Andrei Breguța

27 September 2025 14	Sheriff Tiraspol	1–0	Dacia Buiucani	Tiraspol
18:00 EEST (UTC+3)	Bessala 5'	Report		Stadium: Sheriff Arena; Attendance: 1,684; Referee: Roman Jitari

4 October 2025 15	Politehnica UTM Chișinău	1–2	Sheriff Tiraspol	Chișinău
15:00 EEST (UTC+3)	Musteață 23'; Charles (yellow card) 52'; Pegza (yellow card) 70'; Ghinaitis (yellow card) 87'	Report	Gjoni 7' (yellow card) 88'; Yade 62' (yellow card) 79'; Raí (yellow card) 75'; Bayala (yellow card) 87'	Stadium: Sport Complex UTM; Attendance: 350; Referee: Andrei Ceban

19 October 2025 16	Sheriff Tiraspol	5–0	Spartanii Sportul	Tiraspol
15:00 EEST (UTC+3)	Yade 7', 39', 53'; A.Diarra 72'; Soumah 85'; Forov (yellow card) 86'; Twumasi (yellow card) 90+1'	Report	Sosnovschi (yellow card) 28'	Stadium: Sheriff Arena; Attendance: 814; Referee: Andre Breguța

26 October 2025 17	Milsami Orhei	1–0	Sheriff Tiraspol	Orhei
17:00 EET (UTC+2)	Cobeț 21'; Takyi (yellow card) 23'; Ohajunwa (yellow card) 43'; Yoda (yellow card) 62'; Asmelash (yellow card) 90+5'	Report	Twumasi (yellow card) 47'; Bayala (yellow card) 63'; Yade (yellow card) 90+5'	Stadium: CSR Orhei; Attendance: 1,811; Referee: Denis Ivlev

2 November 2025 18	Sheriff Tiraspol	1–2	Bălți	Tiraspol
14:00 EET (UTC+2)	Ghanem (yellow card) 19'; Raí 26'; Twumasi (yellow card) 37'; Ademo (yellow card) 45'; Bayala (yellow card) 58'	Report	Plătică (yellow card) 19'; Zé Flores 38'; Cociuc 45+1'; Dumitru (yellow card) 47'; Boico (yellow card) 85'; Nazarciuc (yellow card) 90'	Stadium: Sheriff Arena; Attendance: 1,618; Referee: Ivan Tudos

8 November 2025 19	Petrocub Hîncești	4–2	Sheriff Tiraspol	Hîncești
15:00 EET (UTC+2)	Ambros 24', 66' (yellow card) 67'; Plătică (yellow card) 24'; Lupan 50'; Dijinari (yellow card) 58'; Mija 90+1' (o.g.); Jardan (yellow card) 90+3'	Report	Gjoni 4'; Raí 21'; Mija (yellow card) 64'; Soumah (yellow card) 73'	Stadium: Municipal Stadium; Attendance: 820; Referee: Andrei Cojocaru

23 November 2025 20	Sheriff Tiraspol	0–1	Zimbru Chișinău	Tiraspol
15:00 EET (UTC+2)		Report	Amoroso 54' (yellow card) 55'; Ceijas (yellow card) 87'; Zolotov (yellow card) 90+2'	Stadium: Sheriff Arena; Attendance: 2,025; Referee: Andrei Cojocaru

30 November 2025 21	Dacia Buiucani	0–4	Sheriff Tiraspol	Nisporeni
13:00 EET (UTC+2)	Muntean (yellow card) 39'; Baciu (yellow card) 52'	Report	Forov 58'; Ghanem 66' (yellow card) 81'; Străistari (yellow card) 67'; M.Diarra 72'; Cozma 84'	Stadium: Nisporeni Stadium; Attendance: 150; Referee: Andrei Breguța

==== Phase II ====
===== League table =====
Pos	Team	Pld	W	D	L	GF	GA	GD	Pts	Qualification
1	Petrocub Hîncești (C)	10	8	1	1	20	3	+17	40	Qualification for the Champions League first qualifying round
2	Sheriff Tiraspol	10	7	2	1	14	5	+9	34	Qualification for the Europa League first qualifying round (Note: Sheriff Tiraspol qualified for the Europa League first qualifying round as the 2025–26 Moldovan Cup winners.)
3	Zimbru Chișinău	10	5	3	2	18	11	+7	32	Qualification for the Conference League second qualifying round
4	Milsami Orhei	10	2	3	5	5	13	−8	19	Qualification for the Conference League first qualifying round
5	Bălți	10	2	2	6	4	15	−11	16	

Source: FMF, UEFA, Soccerway
Rules for classification: 1) Points; 2) Play-off (only if deciding champion when two teams tied); 3) Head-to-head points; 4) Head-to-head goal difference; 5) Head-to-head goals scored; 6) Matches won; 7) Goal difference; 8) Goals scored; 9) Least red cards; 10) Least yellow cards.
(C) Champions

===== Results summary =====
Overall								Home						Away					
Pld	W	D	L	GF	GA	GD	Pts	W	D	L	GF	GA	GD	W	D	L	GF	GA	GD
10	7	2	1	14	5	+9	23	5	0	0	9	1	+8	2	2	1	5	4	+1

Last updated: 17 May 2026.
Source: FMF

===== Results =====
8 March 2026 1	Bălți	0–1	Sheriff Tiraspol	Bălți
18:00 EET (UTC+2)	Căruntu (yellow card) 35'; Bivol (yellow card) 66'	Report	Loukou (yellow card) 33'; Urvanțev 67' (o.g.); Raí (yellow card) 89'	Stadium: Stadionul Orășenesc; Attendance: 1,900; Referee: Denis Ivlev

14 March 2026 2	Sheriff Tiraspol	1–0	Petrocub Hîncești	Tiraspol
18:00 EET (UTC+2)	Asprilla 3'; Nihaev (yellow card) 51'; Raí (yellow card) 90+3'	Report	Plătică (yellow card)	Stadium: Sheriff Indoor Arena; Attendance: 2,057; Referee: Andrei Breguța

20 March 2026 3	Sheriff Tiraspol	2–0	Dacia Buiucani	Tiraspol
18:00 EET (UTC+2)	Zé Flores 4'; Ghorbel (yellow card) 29'; Nihaev (yellow card) 60'; Asprilla 79'; Forov (yellow card) 85'	Report	Ciumașu (yellow card) 55'; Lambarschi (yellow card) 76'; Efros (yellow card) 81'; Baciu (yellow card) 87'	Stadium: Sheriff Indoor Arena; Attendance: 1,543; Referee: Andrei Ceban

5 April 2026 4	Zimbru Chișinău	2–2	Sheriff Tiraspol	Chișinău
18:00 EEST (UTC+3)	Kazlouski 4', 47'; Zolotov (yellow card) 68'	Report	Ademo 32'; Zé Flores 55'; Ghorbel (yellow card) 63'	Stadium: Zimbru Stadium; Attendance: 3,575; Referee: Andrei Cojocaru

11 April 2026 5	Sheriff Tiraspol	3–1	Milsami Orhei	Tiraspol
18:00 EEST (UTC+3)	Asprilla 6' (pen.), 65', 76'; Zé Flores (yellow card) 87'	Report	Lupano 40'	Stadium: Sheriff Arena; Attendance: 1,086; Referee: Viktor Bugenko

18 April 2026 6	Sheriff Tiraspol	2–0	Bălți	Tiraspol
18:00 EEST (UTC+3)	Klas 9'; Sapata 35'	Report	Botnari (yellow card) 20'; Rusnac (red card) 48'; Plătică (yellow card) 49'; Cotogoi (yellow card) 60'; Căruntu (yellow card) 61'; Cociuc (yellow card) 61'	Stadium: Sheriff Arena; Attendance: 1,050; Referee: Roman Jitari

26 April 2026 7	Petrocub Hîncești	1–0	Sheriff Tiraspol	Hîncești
20:00 EEST (UTC+3)	Cucoș 37'; Șmalenea (yellow card) 90+2'; Borș (yellow card) 90+4'	Report	Fomba (yellow card) 75'	Stadium: Municipal Stadium; Attendance: 1,280; Referee: Denis Ivlev

3 May 2026 8	Dacia Buiucani	1–2	Sheriff Tiraspol	Nisporeni
20:00 EEST (UTC+3)	Lupașco 11'	Report	Asprilla 9'; Fomba (yellow card) 80'; Raí 90'	Stadium: Central Stadium; Attendance: 400; Referee: Ion Orlic

10 May 2026 9	Sheriff Tiraspol	1–0	Zimbru Chișinău	Tiraspol
20:00 EEST (UTC+3)	Ghorbel (yellow card) 40'; Fomba 81'; Ademo (yellow card) 83'; Zé Flores (yellow card) 90+1'; Forov (yellow card) 90+5'	Report	Gesteira (yellow card) 2'; Yermachkov (yellow card) 70'; Kazlouski (yellow card) 71'; Ștefan (yellow card) 90'	Stadium: Sheriff Arena; Attendance: 1,649; Referee: Roman Jitari

17 May 2026 10	Milsami Orhei	0–0	Sheriff Tiraspol	Orhei
20:30 EEST (UTC+3)	Takyi (yellow card) 9'; Kalabatama (yellow card) 60'; Souza (yellow card) 62'; Dujmović (yellow card) 90+4'	Report	Tîmbur (yellow card) 48'; Magloire (yellow card) 60'	Stadium: CSR Orhei; Attendance: 1,478; Referee: Ion Orlic

=== Moldovan Cup ===
29 October 2025 Round of 16	Sheriff Tiraspol	7–0	FCM Ungheni	Tiraspol
16:00 EET (UTC+2)	Ademo 26'; Loukou 36', 62'; Gjoni 52' (pen.); M.Diarra 68', 71'; Luis Phelipe (yellow card) 85' (goal) 88'	Report	Babin (yellow card) 85'	Stadium: Sheriff Arena; Attendance: 411; Referee: Viktor Bugenko

4 March 2026 Quarter-final 1st leg	Sheriff Tiraspol	2–0	Dacia Buiucani	Tiraspol
15:00 EET (UTC+2)	Asprilla 33', 39' (yellow card) 62'; Ademo (yellow card) 44' (yellow-red card) 44'; Ghorbel (yellow card) 51'; Ciss (yellow card) 72'	Report	Baciu (yellow card) 44'; Calestru (yellow card) 45+2'; Ghedrouțan (yellow card) 65'; Dumbrava (yellow card) 68'; Lambarschi (yellow card) 80'	Stadium: Sheriff Indoor Arena; Attendance: 712; Referee: Andrei Ceban

21 April 2026 Quarter-final 2nd leg	Dacia Buiucani	1–2 (1–4 agg.)	Sheriff Tiraspol	Nisporeni
18:00 EEST (UTC+3)	Țurcan 25'; Baciu (yellow card) 57'; Muntean (yellow card) 85'	Report	Mija (yellow card) 15'; Magloire (yellow card) 24'; Magossouba (yellow card) 30'; Danu (yellow card) 67'; Zé Flores (yellow card) 79'; Nihaev 90+1'; Loukou 90+5'	Stadium: Nisporeni Stadium; Attendance: 368; Referee: Dumitru Muntean

6 May 2026 Semi-final 1st leg	Petrocub Hîncești	1–0	Sheriff Tiraspol	Hîncești
19:00 EET (UTC+2)	Bogaciuc 23' (yellow card) 35'; Șmalenea (red card) 70'; Dodon (yellow card) 86'; Pușcaș (yellow card) 90+3'	Report	Klas (yellow card) 90+1'; Forov (yellow card) 90+1'	Stadium: Hîncești Stadium; Attendance: 1,680; Referee: Denis Ivlev

13 May 2026 Semi-final 2nd leg	Sheriff Tiraspol	2–0 (2–1 agg.)	Petrocub Hîncești	Tiraspol
19:00 EEST (UTC+3)	Fomba 38'; Zé Flores 66' (yellow card) 77'; Sapata (yellow card) 68'	Report	Ambros (yellow card) 11'	Stadium: Sheriff Arena; Attendance: 2,512; Referee: Viktor Bugenko

23 May 2026 Final	Sheriff Tiraspol	2–0	Zimbru Chișinău	Chișinău
20:00 EEST (UTC+3)	Asprilla 13'; Hermesh 53' (yellow card) 79'; Tîmbur (yellow card) 64'; Forov (yellow card) 68'; Loukou (yellow card) 79'	Report	Kazlouski (yellow card) 67'; Ceijas (yellow card) 75'; Amoroso (yellow card) 77'	Stadium: Zimbru Stadium; Attendance: 5,589; Referee: Denis Ivlev

=== UEFA Europa League ===
==== Qualifying rounds ====
10 July 2025 First qualifying round 1st leg	Sheriff Tiraspol (Moldova)	4–0	(Kosovo) Prishtina	Tiraspol, Moldova
20:00 EEST (UTC+3)	Bayala 11', 19', 74'; Odede 79'	Report	Salihu (yellow card) 69'; Vitija (yellow card) 70'	Stadium: Sheriff Arena; Attendance: 6,223; Referee: Dario Bel (Croatia)

17 July 2025 First qualifying round 2nd leg	Prishtina (Kosovo)	2–1 (2–5 agg.)	(Moldova) Sheriff Tiraspol	Pristina, Kosovo
21:00 EEST (UTC+3)	Boueye (yellow card) 44'; Namani 56'; Ahmeti 65'	Report	Bayala (yellow card) 26'; Soumah (yellow card) 45+1'; Serobyan 51'	Stadium: Fadil Vokrri Stadium; Attendance: 1,320; Referee: Henrik Nalbandyan (Armenia)

24 July 2025 Second qualifying round 1st leg	Sheriff Tiraspol (Moldova)	1–3	(Netherlands) Utrecht	Nisporeni, Moldova
20:00 EEST (UTC+3)	Ademo 24'; Bessala (yellow card) 69'; Soumah (yellow card) 70'; Loukou (yellow card) 88'	Report	Jensen 33' (yellow card) 62'; Viergever 54'; Blake 70'	Stadium: Central Stadium; Attendance: 2,674; Referee: Philip Farrugia (Malta)
Note: Sheriff Tiraspol played their home match at the Central Stadium in Nisporeni, instead of their regular stadium, the Sheriff Arena, in Tiraspol, due to the Dutch government's travel advisory concerning Transnistria.

31 July 2025 Second qualifying round 2nd leg	Utrecht (Netherlands)	4–1 (7–2 agg.)	(Moldova) Sheriff Tiraspol	Utrecht, Netherlands
21:00 EEST (UTC+3)	Jensen 27'; Horemans 46'; Viergever 56'; Elkarouani 89'	Report	Odede 75'	Stadium: Stadion Galgenwaard; Attendance: 21,611; Referee: Chrysovalantis Theouli (Cyprus)

=== UEFA Conference League ===
==== Qualifying rounds ====
7 August 2025 Third qualifying round 1st leg	Anderlecht (Belgium)	3–0	(Moldova) Sheriff Tiraspol	Brussels, Belgium
21:00 EEST (UTC+3)	Kana (yellow card) 4'; Angulo 17'; Dolberg 48'; Degreef (yellow card) 79'; Verschaeren 81'	Report	Boakye (yellow card) 33'	Stadium: Constant Vanden Stock Stadium; Attendance: 14,124; Referee: Nenad Minaković (Serbia)

14 August 2025 Third qualifying round 2nd leg	Sheriff Tiraspol (Moldova)	1–1 (1–4 agg.)	(Belgium) Anderlecht	Chișinău, Moldova
20:00 EEST (UTC+3)	M.Diarra (yellow card) 1'; Dyulgerov (yellow card) 38'; Magossouba (yellow card) 74'; Bayala (yellow card) 79'; Odede 81'	Report	Stroeykens (yellow card) 29' (penalty missed) 38'; Degreef (yellow card) 55'; Saliba (yellow card) 65' (goal) 72'; Hey (yellow card) 83'; De Cat (yellow card) 90'	Stadium: Zimbru Stadium; Attendance: 4,123; Referee: Halil Umut Meler (Turkey)
Note: Sheriff Tiraspol played their home match at the Zimbru Stadium in Chișinău, instead of their regular stadium, the Sheriff Arena, in Tiraspol, due to the Belgian government's travel advisory concerning Transnistria.

== Squad statistics ==
As of match played 23 May 2026

=== Appearances and goals ===
No.	Pos	Nat	Player	Total		Super Liga		Moldovan Cup		Europa League		Conference League	
No.	Pos	Nat	Player	Apps	Goals	Apps	Goals	Apps	Goals	Apps	Goals	Apps	Goals
1	GK	(Moldova) MDA	Emil Tîmbur	12	0	10	0	2	0	0	0	0	0
2	DF	(Brazil) BRA	Átila	10	0	5+2	0	1	0	2	0	0	0
3	MF	(Israel) ISR	Liam Hermesh	17	1	12+3	0	2	1	0	0	0	0
4	DF	(Liberia) LBR	Natus Jamel Swen	12	0	7	0	0	0	2+1	0	2	0
6	DF	(Brazil) BRA	Raí	42	3	29+1	3	4+2	0	4	0	2	0
7	DF	(Tunisia) TUN	Mahmoud Ghorbel	9	0	7	0	2	0	0	0	0	0
8	MF	(Mali) MLI	Ibrahima Soumah	30	1	18+4	1	2	0	4	0	2	0
10	FW	(Brazil) BRA	Zé Flores	15	3	8+2	2	4+1	1	0	0	0	0
11	FW	(Brazil) BRA	Sapata	15	1	5+5	1	3+2	0	0	0	0	0
13	MF	(Colombia) COL	Marcelino Carreazo	2	0	1	0	1	0	0	0	0	0
14	FW	(Israel) ISR	Qays Ghanem	17	3	3+9	3	1+4	0	0	0	0	0
16	MF	(Moldova) MDA	Daniel Danu	9	0	1+4	0	1+3	0	0	0	0	0
17	MF	(Moldova) MDA	Vsevolod Nihaev	7	1	1+3	0	1+2	1	0	0	0	0
18	DF	(Cameroon) CMR	Eguedegue Magloire	4	0	0+3	0	1	0	0	0	0	0
19	FW	(Colombia) COL	Jayder Asprilla	14	9	10	6	4	3	0	0	0	0
20	DF	(Ghana) GHA	Riis Opoku Twumasi	13	0	7+3	0	3	0	0	0	0	0
21	GK	(Bulgaria) BUL	Ivan Dyulgerov	16	0	10	0	0	0	4	0	2	0
22	FW	(Cameroon) CMR	Mollo Bessala	14	1	9+2	1	0	0	0+3	0	0	0
24	DF	(Moldova) MDA	Danila Forov	30	1	9+15	1	4+2	0	0	0	0	0
25	GK	(Moldova) MDA	Roman Dumenco	1	0	0	0	1	0	0	0	0	0
26	MF	(Suriname) SUR	Dhoraso Klas	15	1	10	1	4+1	0	0	0	0	0
28	GK	(Moldova) MDA	Nicolae Cebotari	3	0	0	0	3	0	0	0	0	0
29	DF	(Mali) MLI	Soumaïla Magossouba	28	1	15+4	1	2+1	0	4	0	2	0
32	MF	(Ghana) GHA	Emmanuel Afetse	3	0	2	0	1	0	0	0	0	0
33	MF	(Moldova) MDA	Mihail Corotcov	8	0	0+5	0	1	0	0+2	0	0	0
35	DF	(Mali) MLI	Bourama Fomba	15	2	10	1	4+1	1	0	0	0	0
42	FW	(Ivory Coast) CIV	Konan Loukou	35	5	13+14	2	4+2	3	0+1	0	0+1	0
44	DF	(Albania) ALB	Alesio Mija	26	0	8+7	0	3+3	0	1+3	0	0+1	0
45	DF	(Senegal) SEN	Baye Assane Ciss	23	0	19+1	0	2+1	0	0	0	0	0
69	MF	(Nigeria) NGR	Peter Ademo	39	4	26+2	2	4+1	1	4	1	2	0
Players away on loan:
27	FW	(Moldova) MDA	Vyacheslav Kozma	13	3	3+6	3	1	0	0+1	0	0+2	0
70	FW	(Brazil) BRA	Luis Phelipe	10	1	4+5	0	0+1	1	0	0	0	0
Players who left Sheriff Tiraspol during the season:
1	GK	(Moldova) MDA	Victor Străistari	11	0	11	0	0	0	0	0	0	0
3	DF	(Ghana) GHA	Nana Kwame Boakye	16	0	10	0	0	0	4	0	2	0
7	DF	(Cape Verde) CPV	Jójó	5	0	4+1	0	0	0	0	0	0	0
7	MF	(Brazil) BRA	Fernando Neto	4	0	2+1	0	0	0	0+1	0	0	0
9	FW	(Albania) ALB	Amarildo Gjoni	22	9	12+3	8	0+1	1	4	0	2	0
10	FW	(Armenia) ARM	Artur Serobyan	10	2	3+2	1	0	0	2+2	1	0+1	0
11	FW	(Burkina Faso) BFA	Cyrille Bayala	21	5	17	2	0	0	2	3	2	0
12	FW	(Nigeria) NGR	Elijah Odede	14	7	5+4	4	0	0	0+3	2	2	1
15	FW	(Mali) MLI	Abdoulaye Diarra	9	2	0+8	2	0	0	0	0	0+1	0
18	MF	(Mali) MLI	Daba Diakite	1	0	0+1	0	0	0	0	0	0	0
71	MF	(Georgia (country)) GEO	Vladimer Mamuchashvili	1	2	1	2	0	0	0	0	0	0
77	FW	(Mali) MLI	Mamady Diarra	19	4	6+6	2	0+1	2	4	0	2	0
90	FW	(Mauritania) MTN	Papa Ndiaga Yade	20	6	7+8	6	0	0	3+1	0	0+1	0

=== Goal scorers ===
Place	Position	Nation	Number	Name	Super Liga	Moldovan Cup	Europa League	Conference League	Total
1	FW	(Albania)	9	Amarildo Gjoni	8	1	0	0	9
1	FW	(Colombia)	19	Jayder Asprilla	6	3	0	0	9
3	MF	(Nigeria)	12	Elijah Odede	4	0	2	1	7
4	FW	(Mauritania)	90	Papa Ndiaga Yade	6	0	0	0	6
5	FW	(Ivory Coast)	42	Konan Loukou	2	3	0	0	5
5	FW	(Burkina Faso)	11	Cyrille Bayala	2	0	3	0	5
7	FW	(Mali)	77	Mamady Diarra	2	2	0	0	4
7	MF	(Nigeria)	69	Peter Ademo	2	1	1	0	4
9	FW	(Israel)	14	Qays Ghanem	3	0	0	0	3
9	FW	(Moldova)	27	Vyacheslav Kozma	3	0	0	0	3
9	DF	(Brazil)	6	Raí	3	0	0	0	3
9	FW	(Brazil)	10	Zé Flores	2	1	0	0	3
13	MF	(Georgia (country))	71	Vladimer Mamuchashvili	2	0	0	0	2
13	DF	(Mali)	29	Soumaïla Magossouba	2	0	0	0	2
13	FW	(Mali)	15	Abdoulaye Diarra	2	0	0	0	2
13	DF	(Mali)	35	Bourama Fomba	1	1	0	0	2
13	FW	(Armenia)	10	Artur Serobyan	1	0	1	0	2
18	FW	(Cameroon)	22	Mollo Bessala	1	0	0	0	1
18	MF	(Mali)	8	Ibrahima Soumah	1	0	0	0	1
18	DF	(Moldova)	24	Danila Forov	1	0	0	0	1
18	MF	(Suriname)	26	Dhoraso Klas	1	0	0	0	1
18	FW	(Brazil)	11	Sapata	1	0	0	0	1
18	FW	(Brazil)	70	Luis Phelipe	0	1	0	0	1
18	MF	(Moldova)	17	Vsevolod Nihaev	0	1	0	0	1
18	MF	(Israel)	3	Liam Hermesh	0	1	0	0	1
18				Own goal	1	0	0	0	1
				TOTALS	57	15	7	1	80

=== Clean sheets ===
Place	Position	Nation	Number	Name	Super Liga	Moldovan Cup	Europa League	Conference League	Total
1	GK	(Moldova)	1	Emil Tîmbur	6	2	0	0	8
2	GK	(Moldova)	1	Victor Străistari	6	0	0	0	6
2	GK	(Bulgaria)	21	Ivan Dyulgerov	5	0	1	0	6
4	GK	(Moldova)	25	Roman Dumenco	0	1	0	0	1
4	GK	(Moldova)	28	Nicolae Cebotari	0	1	0	0	1
				TOTALS	17	4	1	0	22

=== Disciplinary record ===
Number	Nation	Position	Name	Super Liga		Moldovan Cup		Europa League		Conference League		Total	
Number	Nation	Position	Name	Booked	Sent off (straight red)	Booked	Sent off (straight red)	Booked	Sent off (straight red)	Booked	Sent off (straight red)	Booked	Sent off (straight red)
1	(Moldova)	GK	Emil Tîmbur	1	0	1	0	0	0	0	0	2	0
3	(Israel)	MF	Liam Hermesh	0	0	1	0	0	0	0	0	1	0
4	(Liberia)	DF	Natus Jamel Swen	1	0	0	0	0	0	0	0	1	0
6	(Brazil)	DF	Raí	5	0	0	0	0	0	0	0	5	0
7	(Tunisia)	DF	Mahmoud Ghorbel	3	0	1	0	0	0	0	0	4	0
8	(Mali)	MF	Ibrahima Soumah	4	0	0	0	2	0	0	0	6	0
10	(Brazil)	FW	Zé Flores	2	0	2	0	0	0	0	0	4	0
11	(Brazil)	FW	Sapata	0	0	1	0	0	0	0	0	1	0
14	(Israel)	FW	Qays Ghanem	4	0	0	0	0	0	0	0	4	0
16	(Moldova)	MF	Daniel Danu	0	0	1	0	0	0	0	0	1	0
17	(Moldova)	MF	Vsevolod Nihaev	2	0	0	0	0	0	0	0	2	0
18	(Cameroon)	DF	Eguedegue Magloire	1	0	1	0	0	0	0	0	2	0
19	(Colombia)	FW	Jayder Asprilla	0	0	1	0	0	0	0	0	1	0
20	(Ghana)	DF	Riis Opoku Twumasi	3	0	0	0	0	0	0	0	3	0
21	(Bulgaria)	GK	Ivan Dyulgerov	2	0	0	0	0	0	1	0	3	0
22	(Cameroon)	FW	Mollo Bessala	0	0	0	0	1	0	0	0	1	0
24	(Moldova)	DF	Danila Forov	3	0	2	0	0	0	0	0	5	0
26	(Suriname)	MF	Dhoraso Klas	0	0	1	0	0	0	0	0	1	0
29	(Mali)	DF	Soumaïla Magossouba	2	0	1	0	0	0	1	0	4	0
35	(Mali)	DF	Bourama Fomba	2	0	0	0	0	0	0	0	2	0
42	(Ivory Coast)	FW	Konan Loukou	2	0	1	0	1	0	0	0	4	0
44	(Albania)	DF	Alesio Mija	3	0	1	0	0	0	0	0	4	0
45	(Senegal)	DF	Baye Assane Ciss	0	0	1	0	0	0	0	0	1	0
69	(Nigeria)	MF	Peter Ademo	4	0	2	1	0	0	0	0	6	1
Players away on loan:
70	(Brazil)	FW	Luis Phelipe	2	0	1	0	0	0	0	0	3	0
Players who left Sheriff Tiraspol during the season:
1	(Moldova)	GK	Victor Străistari	1	0	0	0	0	0	0	0	1	0
3	(Ghana)	DF	Nana Kwame Boakye	1	0	0	0	0	0	1	0	2	0
9	(Albania)	FW	Amarildo Gjoni	5	1	0	0	0	0	0	0	5	1
11	(Burkina Faso)	FW	Cyrille Bayala	5	0	0	0	1	0	1	0	7	0
15	(Mali)	FW	Abdoulaye Diarra	1	0	0	0	0	0	0	0	1	0
77	(Mali)	FW	Mamady Diarra	0	0	0	0	0	0	1	0	1	0
90	(Mauritania)	FW	Papa Ndiaga Yade	2	0	0	0	0	0	0	0	2	0
			TOTALS	61	1	19	1	5	0	5	0	90	2
