= 2025–26 Moldovan Cup =

2025–26 Cupa Moldovei
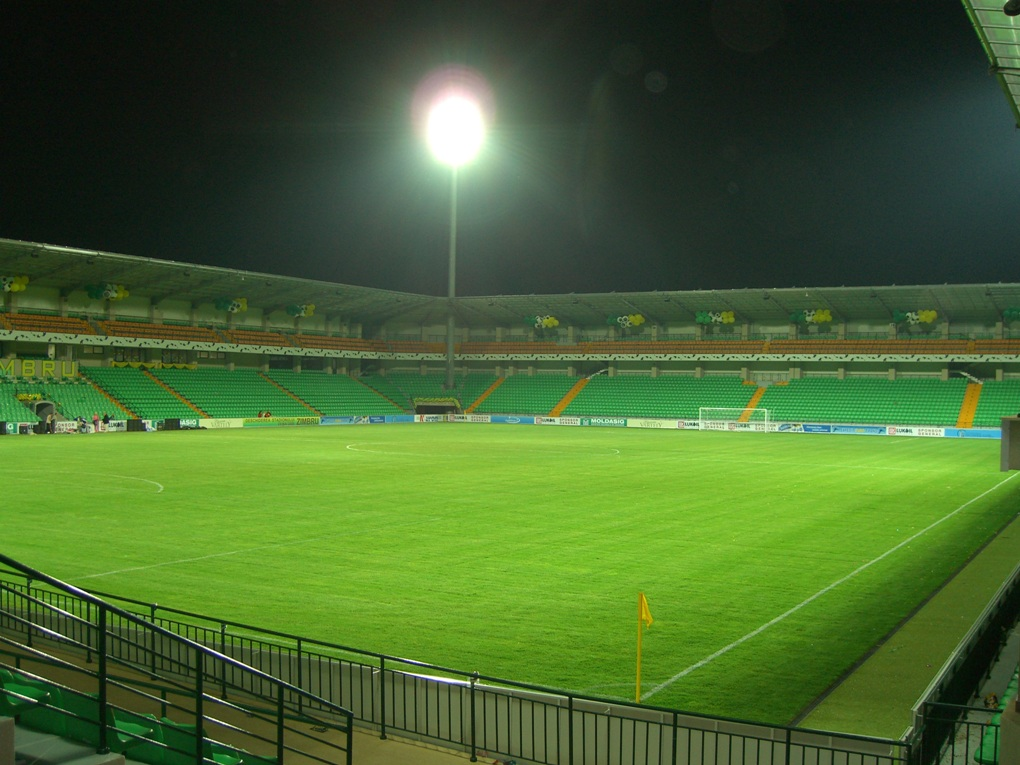
- Zimbru Stadium in Chișinău hosted the final

Tournament details
- Country: Moldova
- Dates: 3 September 2025 – 23 May 2026
- Teams: 37

Final positions
- Champions: Sheriff Tiraspol
- Runners-up: Zimbru Chișinău

Tournament statistics
- Matches played: 42
- Goals scored: 187 (4.45 per match)

The 2025–26 Moldovan Cup (Romanian: Cupa Moldovei) was the 35th season of the annual Moldovan football cup competition. The competition started on 3 September 2025 with the first preliminary round and concluded with the final on 23 May 2026. As the winners, Sheriff Tiraspol qualified for the first qualifying round of the 2026–27 UEFA Europa League.

== Format and schedule ==
Home advantage for the preliminary rounds and the round of 16 is granted to the team from the higher league. If both teams belong to the same division, the team with a higher ranking in the current league season will play at home. The home team in the first legs of the quarter-finals, semi-finals and the final will be the team ranked higher in the current league season.

Round	Draw date	Match dates	Fixtures	Clubs
First preliminary round	26 August 2025	3 September 2025	7	37 → 30
Second preliminary round	26 August 2025	17 September 2025	6	30 → 24
Third preliminary round	23 September 2025	30 September 2025, 1 October 2025	8	24 → 16
Round of 16	7 October 2025	28–29 October 2025	8	16 → 8
Quarter-finals	7 October 2025	3–4 March 2026 (1st leg); 21–22 April 2026 (2nd leg)	8	8 → 4
Semi-finals	7 October 2025	6 May 2026 (1st leg); 13 May 2026 (2nd leg)	4	4 → 2
Final	7 October 2025	23 May 2026	1	2 → 1

== Participating clubs ==
The following teams entered the competition:

Liga the 8 teams of the 2025–26 season	Liga 1 the 10 teams of the 2025–26 season	Liga 2 the 19 teams of the 2025–26 season
Sheriff Tiraspol ^{title holder}; Milsami Orhei ^{runner-up}; Zimbru Chișinău; Petrocub Hîncești; Bălți; Spartanii Sportul; Dacia Buiucani; Politehnica UTM	Victoria Chișinău; Fălești; Stăuceni; Florești; Iskra Rîbnița; FCM Ungheni; Univer Comrat; Olimp Comrat; Real Sireți; Oguz Comrat	Speranța Drochia; Vulturii Cutezători; EFA Visoca; Chișinău; Steaua Nordului; Atletic Strășeni; Locomotiva Ocnița; Socol Copceac; Edineț; Constructorul Leova; Atletico Bălți; Maiak Chirsova; Țarigrad; Real Succes; Grănicerul Glodeni; Congaz; Olimpia Bălți; CMF Cahul; Național Ialoveni

== First preliminary round ==
14 clubs from the Liga 2 entered this round and the other 5 clubs (selected via a draw) received a bye.

3 September 2025	Maiak Chirsova (3)	1–2	Congaz (3)	Chirsova
16:30 EEST	Dobrioglo 45+2'	Report	Gaidarji 32'; Terlețchii 90+2'	Stadium: Chirsova Stadium; Attendance: 200; Referee: Gheorghe Dandeș

3 September 2025	EFA Visoca (3)	9–0	Țarigrad (3)	Cricova
16:30 EEST	Cudalbă 2'; Cucoș 8', 12', 28'; Pașa 45', 59'; Iurcu 72'; Gherman 76', 90'	Report		Stadium: Cricova Stadium; Attendance: 100; Referee: Alexandr Korovinski

3 September 2025	Vulturii Cutezători (3)	5–2	Olimpia Bălți (3)	Sîngerei
16:30 EEST	Pîslă 12' (pen.), 22', 69'; Beștanco 82', 84'	Report	Mateițov 35', 89'	Stadium: Sîngerei Stadium; Attendance: 150; Referee: Vitalie Urzica

3 September 2025	Steaua Nordului (3)	2–0	Speranța Drochia (3)	Criuleni
16:30 EEST	Voitco 32'; Climenciuc 64' (o.g.)	Report		Stadium: Criuleni Stadium; Attendance: 100; Referee: Daniel Andronachi

3 September 2025	Locomotiva Ocnița (3)	2–1	Real Succes (3)	Ocnița
16:30 EEST	Murguleț 9'; A. Ciumac 45+1'	Report	Gherganov 56'	Stadium: Ocnița Stadium; Attendance: 100; Referee: Ivan Luca

3 September 2025	Chișinău (3)	7–3	Grănicerul Glodeni (3)	Chișinău
16:30 EEST	Boboc 12'; Onofrei 18'; Prodan 20', 48'; Laur 33' (pen.); Bîtca 72', 89'	Report	Colbasiuc 45+1' (pen.); Pascariuc 58'; Gaman 86'	Stadium: Petru Zadnipru; Attendance: 20; Referee: Vlad Marin

3 September 2025	Edineț (3)	0–4	Național Ialoveni (3)	Edineț
16:30 EEST		Report	Rusu 20'; Dodan 35', 37', 89'	Stadium: Edineț Stadium; Attendance: 100; Referee: Anatolie Țîbulca

== Second preliminary round ==
12 clubs from the Liga 2 entered this round.

17 September 2025	Național Ialoveni (3)	3–0	Chișinău (3)	Costești
15:00 EEST	Dodan 13'; Bânzaru 22'; V. Graur 90+1'	Report		Stadium: Costești Stadium; Attendance: 60; Referee: Anatoli Glavațchii

17 September 2025	Socol Copceac (3)	1–8	Atletico Bălți (3)	Copceac
16:00 EEST	Culicovschii 56'	Report	Cebotari 3', 25', 28'; Babiuc 40' (pen.); Axenti 44'; Musteață 50'; Gorea 58'; Crihan 90'	Stadium: Copceac Stadium; Attendance: 50; Referee: Ruslan Țițilovschi

17 September 2025	Atletic Strășeni (3)	3–6 (a.e.t.)	Constructorul Leova (3)	Lozova
16:00 EEST	Celeadnic 59' (pen.), 83'; Donoagă 67'	Report	Stoleru 4'; Carp 39'; Vlas 62'; Paladi 99'; Zacon 111'; Daraban 119'	Stadium: Nicolae Simatoc; Attendance: 20; Referee: Vitalie Urzica

17 September 2025	Congaz (3)	2–1	CMF Cahul (3)	Ceadîr-Lunga
16:00 EEST	Sincu 6'; Gorodețchi 39'	Report	Prepelița 45'	Stadium: Ceadîr-Lunga; Attendance: 200; Referee: Alexandru Codreanu

17 September 2025	Vulturii Cutezători (3)	2–3	EFA Visoca (3)	Sîngerei
16:00 EEST	Secureanu 71'; Maga 81'	Report	Gherman 13'; Pașa 70', 86'	Stadium: Sîngerei Stadium; Attendance: 200; Referee: Piotr Orlovschi

17 September 2025	Steaua Nordului (3)	7–1	Locomotiva Ocnița (3)	Criuleni
16:00 EEST	Diordiev 7'; Trinca 26' (o.g.); Bobrov 45+1'; Ceavdari 54', 88'; Voitco 69'; Picus 86'	Report	A. Ciumac 56'	Stadium: Criuleni Stadium; Attendance: 50; Referee: Daniel Andronachi

== Third preliminary round ==
6 clubs from the Liga 2 and 10 clubs from the Liga 1 entered this round.

30 September 2025	Real Sireți (2)	7–2 (a.e.t.)	Atletico Bălți (3)	Sireți
15:00 EEST	Gulceac 20', 73', 105+1', 112'; Orbu 94'; Borovschi 98'; Zalenschi 120'	Report	Palii 31', 55'	Stadium: Sireți Stadium; Attendance: 100; Referee: Ion Arhirii

30 September 2025	Iskra Rîbnița (2)	4–1	Congaz (3)	Rîbnița
15:00 EEST	A. Popovici 17'; Șoimu 59', 90+4'; Mihaliov 90'	Report	Guțu 85'	Stadium: Rîbnița Stadium; Attendance: 50; Referee: Andrei Cuzeac

30 September 2025	Florești (2)	6–0	EFA Visoca (3)	Bender
15:00 EEST	Sidorenco 40', 55' (pen.), 56'; Arabadji 58'; Mîrza 81', 84'	Report		Stadium: Bender Stadium; Attendance: 50; Referee: Andrei Ghetmanciuc

30 September 2025	FCM Ungheni (2)	3–0	Steaua Nordului (3)	Ungheni
15:00 EEST	~~Proca 32', 60'~~; ~~Marjin 97'~~	Report	~~Picus 66' (pen.)~~ ~~Voitco 84'~~	Stadium: Ungheni Stadium; Attendance: 500; Referee: Serghei Gavriliuc
Note: The match originally ended 3–2 for FCM Ungheni after extra time. Steaua Nordului used a total of seven substitutes, while only six were allowed.

30 September 2025	Stăuceni (2)	4–2 (a.e.t.)	Național Ialoveni (3)	Stăuceni
15:00 EEST	Chițanu 13'; Țelic 96', 101', 103'	Report	Dodan 20', 110'	Stadium: Olimp Stadium; Attendance: 100; Referee: Alexandru Codreanu

30 September 2025	Fălești (2)	1–2	Victoria Chișinău (2)	Fălești
15:00 EEST	Platniuc 33'	Report	Ș. Lupașcu 67'; Pavlov 90'	Stadium: Fălești Stadium; Attendance: 100; Referee: Piotr Orlovschi

30 September 2025	Oguz Comrat (2)	1–2	Olimp Comrat (2)	Comrat
15:00 EEST	Gheorghiev 52'	Report	Castro 58'; Taras 88'	Stadium: Victor Mumjiev; Attendance: 200; Referee: Iurie Dogaru

1 October 2025	Univer Comrat (2)	6–1	Constructorul Leova (3)	Comrat
15:00 EEST	Botnarenco 6', 64'; Matei 14'; Condruc 22', 41'; Bucicov 26'	Report	Diacenco 88' (pen.)	Stadium: Victor Mumjiev; Attendance: 50; Referee: Gheorghe Dandeș

== Final stage ==
=== Bracket ===
Round of 16
Petrocub Hîncești	2
Olimp Comrat	0
Bălți	6
Victoria Chișinău	1
Sheriff Tiraspol	7
FCM Ungheni	0
Dacia Buiucani	1
Stăuceni	0
Zimbru Chișinău	10
Univer Comrat	0
Politehnica UTM	6
Real Sireți	1
Milsami Orhei	1
Florești	0
Spartanii Sportul	3
Iskra Rîbnița	1

Quarter-finals
Petrocub Hîncești	1	1	2
Bălți	0	1	1
Sheriff Tiraspol	2	2	4
Dacia Buiucani	0	1	1
Zimbru Chișinău	5	5	10
Politehnica UTM	0	0	0
Milsami Orhei	5	0	5
Spartanii Sportul	0	0	0

Semi-finals
Petrocub Hîncești	1	0	1
Sheriff Tiraspol	0	2	2
Zimbru Chișinău	2	1	3
Milsami Orhei	0	0	0

Final
Sheriff Tiraspol	2
Zimbru Chișinău	0

== Round of 16 ==
8 clubs from the Liga 1 and 8 clubs from the Liga entered this round.

28 October 2025	Spartanii Sportul (1)	3–1	Iskra Rîbnița (2)	Suruceni
13:00 EET	Danilov 67'; Leuca 77' (pen.); Weisz 90+1'	Report	Gliga 69'	Stadium: Suruceni Stadium; Attendance: 100; Referee: Dumitru Muntean

28 October 2025	Bălți (1)	6–1	Victoria Chișinău (2)	Bălți
13:00 EET	Plătică 13', 44', 56'; Boțan 20'; Rusnac 54'; Rogac 90'	Report	Pavlov 18' (pen.)	Stadium: Bălți Stadium; Attendance: 451; Referee: Andrei Diordiev

28 October 2025	Zimbru Chișinău (1)	10–0	Univer Comrat (2)	Chișinău
16:00 EET	Jonathas 17', 51'; Shchebetun 20'; Cojocari 45'; Caio 49'; Cleșcenco 53', 82', 87'; Dahan 86'; Sharkouski 88'	Report		Stadium: Zimbru Stadium; Attendance: 220; Referee: Andrei Ceban

28 October 2025	Dacia Buiucani (1)	1–0	Stăuceni (2)	Nisporeni
16:00 EET	Dumbrava 45'	Report		Stadium: Nisporeni Stadium; Attendance: 150; Referee: Daniel Luca

29 October 2025	Politehnica UTM (1)	6–1	Real Sireți (2)	Suruceni
13:00 EET	Gandi 31', 64'; Gabriel 44'; Radu 47'; Sprinsean 51'; Lipcan 84'	Report	Mardari 18' (o.g.)	Stadium: Suruceni Stadium; Attendance: 64; Referee: Andrei Cojocaru

29 October 2025	Milsami Orhei (1)	1–0	Florești (2)	Orhei
13:00 EET	Igor 9'	Report		Stadium: Sport Complex; Attendance: 322; Referee: Stanislav Leu

29 October 2025	Sheriff Tiraspol (1)	7–0	FCM Ungheni (2)	Tiraspol
16:00 EET	Ademo 26'; Loukou 36', 62'; Gjoni 52' (pen.); Diarra 68', 71'; Phelipe 88'	Report		Stadium: Sheriff small Arena; Attendance: 411; Referee: Viktor Bugenko

29 October 2025	Petrocub Hîncești (1)	2–0	Olimp Comrat (2)	Hîncești
16:00 EET	Pușcaș 58'; Bogaciuc 74'	Report		Stadium: Hîncești Stadium; Attendance: 550; Referee: Roman Jitari

== Quarter-finals ==
8 clubs from the Liga entered this round.

3 March 2026 1st leg	Zimbru Chișinău (1)	5–0	Politehnica UTM (1)	Chișinău
13:00 EET	Marcello 12'; Sharkouski 20'; Kazlouski 40'; Jonathas 65'; Amoroso 80'	Report		Stadium: CPTF Stadium; Attendance: 350; Referee: Andrei Diordiev

21 April 2026 2nd leg	Politehnica UTM (1)	0–5 (0–10 agg.)	Zimbru Chișinău (1)	Orhei
15:00 EEST		Report	Bețivu 14'; Yermachkov 21'; Șilcenco 72'; Kazlouski 76', 87'	Stadium: Sport Complex; Attendance: 50; Referee: Denis Ivlev

3 March 2026 1st leg	Milsami Orhei (1)	5–0	Spartanii Sportul (1)	Orhei
15:00 EET	Keita 27', 61'; Cobeț 52'; Igor 60', 73'	Report		Stadium: Sport Complex; Attendance: 350; Referee: Ion Orlic

22 April 2026 2nd leg	Spartanii Sportul (1)	0–0 (0–5 agg.)	Milsami Orhei (1)	Nisporeni
15:00 EEST		Report		Stadium: Nisporeni Stadium; Attendance: 100; Referee: Andrei Diordiev

4 March 2026 1st leg	Petrocub Hîncești (1)	1–0	Bălți (1)	Hîncești
13:00 EET	Pușcaș 18'	Report		Stadium: Hîncești Stadium; Attendance: 480; Referee: Viktor Bugenko

22 April 2026 2nd leg	Bălți (1)	1–1 (1–2 agg.)	Petrocub Hîncești (1)	Bălți
18:00 EEST	Boico 59'	Report	Popescu 85'	Stadium: Bălți Stadium; Attendance: 1,524; Referee: Andrei Cojocaru

4 March 2026 1st leg	Sheriff Tiraspol (1)	2–0	Dacia Buiucani (1)	Tiraspol
15:00 EET	Asprilla 33', 39'	Report		Stadium: Sheriff Indoor Arena; Attendance: 712; Referee: Andrei Ceban

21 April 2026 2nd leg	Dacia Buiucani (1)	1–2 (1–4 agg.)	Sheriff Tiraspol (1)	Nisporeni
18:00 EEST	Țurcan 25' (pen.)	Report	Nihaev 90+1'; Loukou 90+5'	Stadium: Nisporeni Stadium; Attendance: 368; Referee: Dumitru Muntean

== Semi-finals ==
4 clubs from the Liga entered this round.

6 May 2026 1st leg	Zimbru Chișinău (1)	2–0	Milsami Orhei (1)	Chișinău
19:00 EEST	Jonathas 40', 66'	Report		Stadium: Zimbru Stadium; Attendance: 580; Referee: Stanislav Leu

13 May 2026 2nd leg	Milsami Orhei (1)	0–1 (0–3 agg.)	Zimbru Chișinău (1)	Orhei
19:00 EEST		Report	Amoroso 72'	Stadium: Sport Complex; Attendance: 776; Referee: Stanislav Leu

6 May 2026 1st leg	Petrocub Hîncești (1)	1–0	Sheriff Tiraspol (1)	Hîncești
19:00 EEST	Bogaciuc 23'	Report		Stadium: Hîncești Stadium; Attendance: 1,680; Referee: Denis Ivlev

13 May 2026 2nd leg	Sheriff Tiraspol (1)	2–0 (2–1 agg.)	Petrocub Hîncești (1)	Tiraspol
19:00 EEST	Fomba 38'; Flores 66'	Report		Stadium: Sheriff small Arena; Attendance: 2,512; Referee: Viktor Bugenko

== Final ==
The final was played on Saturday 23 May 2026 at the Zimbru Stadium in Chișinău.

23 May 2026
20:00 EEST

Sheriff Tiraspol	2–0	Zimbru Chișinău
Asprilla 13'; Hermesh 53'	Report

Zimbru Stadium, Chișinău
Attendance: 5,589
Referee: Denis Ivlev (Moldova)

Sheriff	Zimbru

GK	1	(Moldova) Emil Tîmbur	(yellow card) 64'
DF	6	(Brazil) Raí Lopes
DF	24	(Moldova) Danila Forov	(yellow card) 68'
DF	35	(Mali) Bourama Fomba
DF	45	(Senegal) Baye Assane Ciss
MF	3	(Israel) Liam Hermesh	(yellow card) 79'	(substituted off) 90+2'
MF	11	(Brazil) Sapata		(substituted off) 67'
MF	26	(Suriname) Dhoraso Klas
MF	69	(Nigeria) Peter Ademo (c)		(substituted off) 90+2'
FW	10	(Brazil) Zé Flores		(substituted off) 67'
FW	19	(Colombia) Jayder Asprilla		(substituted off) 89'
Substitutes:
GK	28	(Moldova) Nicolae Cebotari
DF	7	(Tunisia) Mahmoud Ghorbel
DF	18	(Cameroon) Eguedegue Magloire
DF	29	(Mali) Soumaïla Magossouba
DF	30	(Moldova) Alexandr Egupov
DF	44	(Albania) Alesio Mija		(substituted on) 90+2'
MF	16	(Moldova) Daniel Danu		(substituted on) 67'
MF	17	(Moldova) Vsevolod Nihaev		(substituted on) 90+2'
MF	32	(Ghana) Emmanuel Afetse
FW	14	(Israel) Qays Ghanem		(substituted on) 89'
FW	42	(Ivory Coast) Konan Loukou	(yellow card) 79'	(substituted on) 67'
Head Coach:
(Moldova) Victor Mihailov

GK	88	(Serbia) Ivan Dokić
DF	29	(Ivory Coast) Abou Dosso
DF	30	(Moldova) Andrei Macrițchii
DF	33	(Moldova) Mihail Ștefan (c)
DF	35	(Belarus) Nikolai Zolotov
MF	5	(Brazil) Matteo Amoroso	(yellow card) 77'
MF	7	(Brazil) Caio Dantas		(substituted off) 71'
MF	8	(Belarus) Tsimafei Sharkouski		(substituted off) 81'
MF	11	(Brazil) Jonathas Abimael		(substituted off) 71'
MF	24	(Argentina) Thiago Ceijas	(yellow card) 75'	(substituted off) 87'
FW	15	(Belarus) Dzianis Kazlouski	(yellow card) 67'
Substitutes:
GK	12	(Ukraine) Artem Odyntsov
GK	92	(Moldova) Cristian Sîrghi
DF	4	(Moldova) Cristian Gonța
DF	6	(Brazil) Pedro Henrique
DF	34	(Ukraine) Ivan Yermachkov
MF	14	(Curaçao) Rayvien Rosario		(substituted on) 71'
MF	17	(Moldova) Tudor Butucel		(substituted on) 87'
MF	22	(Sweden) Ahmed Bonnah
MF	25	(Belarus) Ilya Vasilevich		(substituted on) 81'
MF	77	(Moldova) Serafim Cojocari		(substituted on) 71'
FW	99	(Moldova) Alexandru Bețivu
Head Coach:
(Belarus) Oleg Kubarev

Assistant referees:
Vladislav Lifciu (Moldova)
Vadim Roșca (Moldova)
Additional assistant referees:
Roman Jitari (Moldova)
Andrei Ceban (Moldova)
Fourth official:
Vadim Vicol (Moldova)

Match rules

- 90 minutes.
- 30 minutes of extra time if necessary.
- Penalty shoot-out if score is still level.
- Eleven named substitutes.
- Maximum of five substitutions, with a sixth allowed in extra time.
