= Eduardo (footballer, born 2000) =

Brazilian footballer

Personal information
- Full name: Eduardo da Silva Albuquerque
- Date of birth: 15 June 2000 (age 26)
- Place of birth: Miraíma, Brazil
- Height: 1.73 m (5 ft 8 in)
- Position: Midfielder

Team information
- Current team: São Bernardo (on loan from Vitória)
- Number: 26

Youth career
- 2015–2016: Estação
- 2016–2020: Vitória

Senior career*
Years	Team	Apps	(Gls)
2020–	Vitória	91	(4)
2023	→ Náutico (loan)	17	(0)
2023–2024	→ Portuguesa (loan)	9	(0)
2024	→ CSA (loan)	11	(0)
2025	→ Noroeste (loan)	12	(2)
2025	→ São Bernardo (loan)	21	(3)
2026–	→ São Bernardo (loan)	36	(3)
- * Club domestic league appearances and goals as of 18 November 2026

Eduardo da Silva Albuquerque (born 15 June 2000), simply known as Eduardo or sometimes as Dudu Miraíma, is a Brazilian footballer who plays as a midfielder for São Bernardo, on loan from Vitória.

== Career ==
Born in Miraíma, Ceará, Eduardo joined Vitória's youth setup in 2016, after failed trials at Fluminense and Juventude. He made his first team debut on 15 February 2020, starting in a 2–1 Campeonato Baiano home win over Atlético de Alagoinhas.

On 22 June 2020, Eduardo renewed his contract with Leão until December 2023. He scored his first goal for the club on 17 April 2021, netting a last-minute winner in a 2–1 home success over Altos, for the year's Copa do Nordeste.

On 31 August 2022, already established as a first team member, Eduardo further extended his link with Vitória until 2025. On 20 April of the following year, he was loaned to Náutico for the remainder of the season.

On 6 September 2023, after Náutico's elimination from the 2023 Série C, Eduardo moved to Portuguesa also in a temporary deal. He never managed to establish himself at Vitória in the following years, serving other loans at CSA, Noroeste and São Bernardo.

== Career statistics ==
As of 1 November 2026

Club	Season	League			State League		Cup		Continental		Other		Total	
Club	Season	Division	Apps	Goals	Apps	Goals	Apps	Goals	Apps	Goals	Apps	Goals	Apps	Goals
Vitória	2020	Série B	17	0	3	0	0	0	—		0	0	20	0
Vitória	2021	Série B	22	2	4	0	3	1	—		5 (Note: Appearance(s) in Copa do Nordeste)	1	34	4
Vitória	2022	Série C	21	0	8	2	4	0	—		—		33	2
Vitória	2023	Série B	0	0	6	0	1	0	—		6	0	13	0
Vitória	2026	Série A	0	0	5	0	0	0	—		0	0	5	0
Vitória	Total		60	2	26	2	8	1	—		11	1	105	6
Náutico (loan)	2023	Série C	17	0	—		—		—		—		17	0
Portuguesa (loan)	2023	Paulista	—		0	0	—		—		2 (Note: Appearance(s) in Copa Paulista)	0	2	0
Portuguesa (loan)	2024	Paulista	—		9	0	—		—		—		9	0
Portuguesa (loan)	Total		—		9	0	—		—		2	0	11	0
CSA (loan)	2024	Série C	11	0	—		—		—		—		11	0
Noroeste (loan)	2025	Paulista	—		12	2	—		—		—		12	2
São Bernardo (loan)	2025	Série C	21	3	—		—		—		—		21	3
São Bernardo (loan)	2026	Série B	34	3	—		3	0	—		2 (Note: Appearance(s) in Copa Sul-Sudeste)	1	44	4
Career total			143	6	42	4	11	1	0	0	15	2	216	15
