= Fernando Neto =

Fernando Neto may refer to:

- Fernando Neto (footballer, born 1993), Brazilian football midfielder for São Bernardo
- Fernando Neto (footballer, born 2003), Brazilian football winger for São José-SP
