= Ivan Dyulgerov =

Bulgarian footballer

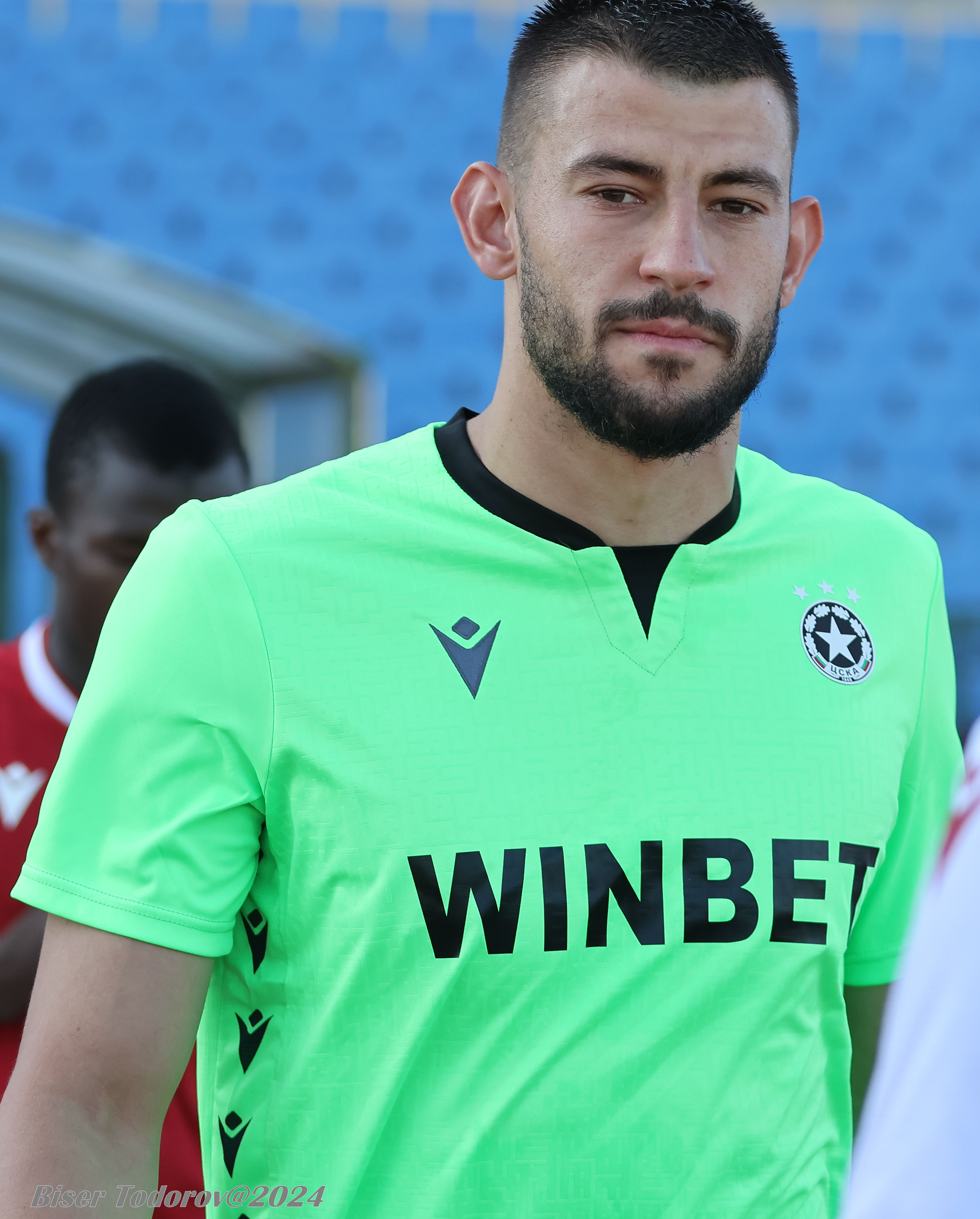
- Dyulgerov with CSKA Sofia in 2024

Personal information
- Full name: Ivan Vasilev Dyulgerov
- Date of birth: 15 July 1999 (age 27)
- Place of birth: Varna, Bulgaria
- Height: 1.91 m (6 ft 3 in)
- Position: Goalkeeper

Team information
- Current team: Sheriff Tiraspol
- Number: 21

Youth career
- 2010–2017: Cherno More

Senior career*
Years	Team	Apps	(Gls)
2016–2024	Cherno More	123	(0)
2024–2025	CSKA Sofia	17	(0)
2025–	Sheriff Tiraspol	10	(0)

International career^{‡}
2017	Bulgaria U18	1	(0)
2017–2018	Bulgaria U19	3	(0)
2019–2020	Bulgaria U21	1	(0)
2022–	Bulgaria	6	(0)
- * Club domestic league appearances and goals as of 17:04, 27 September 2025 (UTC) ‡ National team caps and goals as of 4 June 2024

Ivan Vasilev Dyulgerov (Bulgarian: Иван Василев Дюлгеров; born 15 July 1999) is a Bulgarian professional footballer who plays as a goalkeeper for Moldovan Liga club Sheriff Tiraspol.

== Career ==
A product of Cherno More's academy, Dyulgerov joined the first team as third choice goalkeeper in January 2016, following the departure of Iliya Nikolov. He made his league debut for Cherno More in a 3–1 away win over Neftochimic Burgas on 19 March 2017, playing the full 90 minutes. In the first half, he was booked for a foul against Ivan Valchanov in the penalty area, but he saved Galin Ivanov's penalty. Subsequently, Dyulgerov won the Man of the match award.

Dyulgerov made his 100th appearance for the club in the First League on 1 October 2023 against Lokomotiv Sofia, keeping his 44th league clean sheet.

== International career ==
Dyulgerov was called up for the Bulgaria U18 squad for a friendly against Georgia U19 on 11 June 2017. He made his debut coming on as substitute for Dimitar Sheytanov. On 12 September 2017, Dyulgerov made his debut for Bulgaria U19 in a friendly against Bosnia and Herzegovina U19.

Dyulgerov made his debut for the Bulgarian under-21 team on 22 March 2019 in the starting eleven for the friendly against Northern Ireland U21.

== Career statistics ==
=== Club ===
As of 21 September 2025

Club performance			League		Cup		Continental		Other		Total	
Club	League	Season	Apps	Goals	Apps	Goals	Apps	Goals	Apps	Goals	Apps	Goals
Bulgaria			League		Bulgarian Cup		Europe		Other (Note: Includes Bulgarian Supercup matches.)		Total	
Cherno More	First League	2016–17	1	0	0	0	–		–		1	0
Cherno More	First League	2017–18	3	0	0	0	–		–		3	0
Cherno More	First League	2018–19	11	0	1	0	–		–		12	0
Cherno More	First League	2019–20	9	0	0	0	–		–		9	0
Cherno More	First League	2020–21	15	0	2	0	–		–		17	0
Cherno More	First League	2021–22	23	0	1	0	–		–		24	0
Cherno More	First League	2022–23	26	0	5	0	–		–		31	0
Cherno More	First League	2023–24	35	0	0	0	–		–		35	0
Cherno More	Total		123	0	9	0	0	0	0	0	132	0
CSKA Sofia	First League	2024–25	17	0	2	0	–		–		19	0
Sheriff Tiraspol	Moldovan Super Liga	2025–26	10	0	0	0	6	0	–		16	0
Career statistics			150	0	11	0	6	0	0	0	167	0

=== International ===
As of match played 4 June 2024

Appearances and goals by national team and year
National team	Year	Apps	Goals
Bulgaria	2023	4	0
Bulgaria	2024	2	0
Total		6	0
