= Alexandru Bețivu =

Moldovan footballer

Personal information
- Date of birth: 21 June 2007 (age 19)
- Place of birth: Chișcăreni, Moldova
- Height: 1.84 m (6 ft 0 in)
- Position: Forward

Team information
- Current team: Zimbru Chișinău
- Number: 99

Youth career
- 2016–2022: Sîngerei
- 2022–2024: Zimbru Chișinău

Senior career*
Years	Team	Apps	(Gls)
2024–2025	Tunari		
2025–2026	Zimbru-2	22	(8)
2026–	Zimbru Chișinău	15	(8)

International career^{‡}
2026–	Moldova	2	(0)
- * Club domestic league appearances and goals as of 18:41, 20 November 2026 (UTC) ‡ National team caps and goals as of 18:41, 20 November 2026 (UTC)

Alexandru Bețivu (born 21 June 2007) is a Moldovan footballer who plays for Moldovan Liga club Zimbru Chișinău and the Moldova national team.

== Club career ==
Bețivu began playing football at local club FC Sîngerei at age eight. At age fifteen, he then moved to the academy of FC Zimbru Chișinău and joined the club's under-16 side. In 2025, he moved to Romanian club CS Tunari and played for its senior team in the Liga III for the 2024–25 season. CS Tunari finished the season as champions and were promoted to Liga II. Following the season, he returned to Zimbru Chișinău and played for the club's U19 team and reserve side.

Bețivu made his first-team debut for Zimbru Chișinău in a 2025–26 Moldovan Cup quarter-finals match with Politehnica UTM on 21 April 2026. He scored his first senior goal for the club in the eventual 5–0 victory. He was added to the first team squad for the 2026–27 season and quickly established himself in the starting lineup. The forward scored eight goals in the first half of the season, placing him second among league scorers at that time.

== International career ==
Bețivu represented Moldova at various youth levels. He was called up to the Moldovan national team for the first time in November 2026 for 2026–27 UEFA Nations League C matches against Kazakhstan and the Faroe Islands. He made his senior international debut in the match against Kahzakhstan on 13 November 2026, entering as a 58th-minute substitute for Nicky Cleșcenco in the eventual 2–1 victory.

=== International career statistics ===
As of match played 16 November 2026

Moldova
Year	Apps	Goals
2026	2	0
Total	2	0
