= Marcelino Carreazo =

Colombian footballer (born 1999)

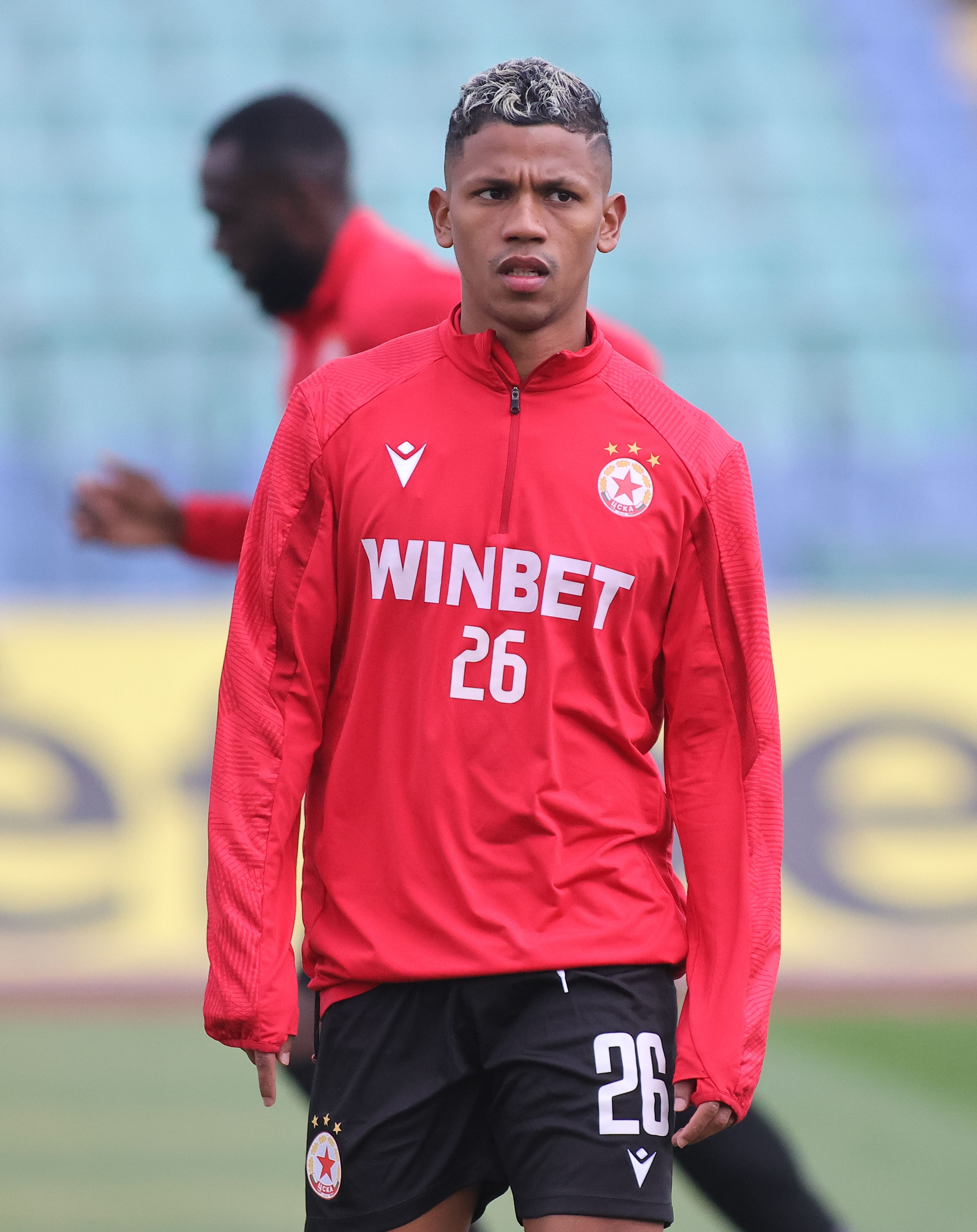
- Carreazo with CSKA Sofia in 2023

Personal information
- Full name: Marcelino Jr Carreazo Betin
- Date of birth: 17 December 1999 (age 26)
- Place of birth: El Carmen de Bolívar, Colombia
- Height: 1.79 m (5 ft 10 in)
- Position: Midfielder

Team information
- Current team: Kalamata
- Number: 21

Youth career
- –2018: Once Caldas

Senior career*
Years	Team	Apps	(Gls)
2018–2022	Once Caldas	120	(19)
2022–2025	CSKA Sofia	80	(10)
2025–2026	Apollon Limassol	5	(0)
2026	Sheriff Tiraspol	1	(0)
2026–	Kalamata	2	(0)
- * Club domestic league appearances and goals as of 22:00, 6 September 2026 (UTC)

Marcelino Jr Carreazo Betin (born 17 December 1999) is a Colombian professional footballer who plays as a midfielder for Super League Greece club Kalamata.

== Early life ==
Carreazo was born in El Carmen de Bolívar, Colombia to a Colombian father and a Venezuelan mother.

== Career ==
On 12 March 2026, Moldovan Liga club Sheriff Tiraspol announced the signing of Carreazo.

== Career statistics ==
As of match played 13 May 2026

Appearances and goals by club, season and competition
Club	Season	League			National cup		Continental		Other		Total	
Club	Season	Division	Apps	Goals	Apps	Goals	Apps	Goals	Apps	Goals	Apps	Goals
Once Caldas	2018	Categoría Primera A	26	2	9	1	—		—		35	3
Once Caldas	2019	Categoría Primera A	23	5	2	0	2	0	—		27	5
Once Caldas	2020	Categoría Primera A	20	4	2	1	—		—		22	5
Once Caldas	2021	Categoría Primera A	35	5	1	0	—		—		36	5
Once Caldas	2022	Categoría Primera A	16	3	4	0	—		—		20	3
Once Caldas	Total		120	19	18	2	2	0	0	0	140	21
CSKA Sofia	2022–23	First League	23	3	3	0	—		—		26	3
CSKA Sofia	2023–24	First League	29	3	5	0	2	0	1	0	37	3
CSKA Sofia	2024–25	First League	28	4	5	1	—		1	0	34	5
CSKA Sofia	Total		80	10	13	1	2	0	2	0	97	11
Apollon Limassol	2025–26	First Division	5	0	1	0	—		—		6	0
Sheriff Tiraspol	2025–26	Moldovan Liga	1	0	1	0	—		—		2	0
Career total			206	29	33	3	4	1	2	0	245	32
