= Laur Chițanu =

Moldovan footballer

Personal information
- Full name: Laurențiu Chițanu
- Date of birth: 1 September 2000 (age 26)
- Place of birth: Chișinău, Moldova
- Position: Striker

Team information
- Current team: Spartak (Varna)

Senior career*
Years	Team	Apps	(Gls)
2018−2019	Marinhense B		
2020	Scandicci		
2021	Florești	12	(1)
2022–	Spartak (Varna)	0	(0)
- * Club domestic league appearances and goals

Laurențiu Chițanu (born 1 September 2000) is a Moldovan footballer who plays as a striker for Spartak (Varna). Besides Moldova, he has played in Portugal, Italy, and Bulgaria.

== Career ==
He started his career with Portuguese sixth tier side Marinhense B. Before the second half of 2019–20, he signed for Scandicci in the Italian fourth tier. In 2021, Chițanu signed for Moldovan club Florești, where he made 12 league appearances and scored 1 goal. On 8 August 2021, he debuted for Florești during a 1–4 loss to Milsami. On 6 November 2021, Chițanu scored his first goal for Florești during a 1–5 loss to Dinamo-Auto. Before the second half of 2021–22, he signed for Spartak (Varna) in Bulgaria after trialing for Spanish team Castellón.
