= Miraíma =

Municipality in Ceará, Brazil

Coordinates: 3°35′S 39°59′W

- Municipality
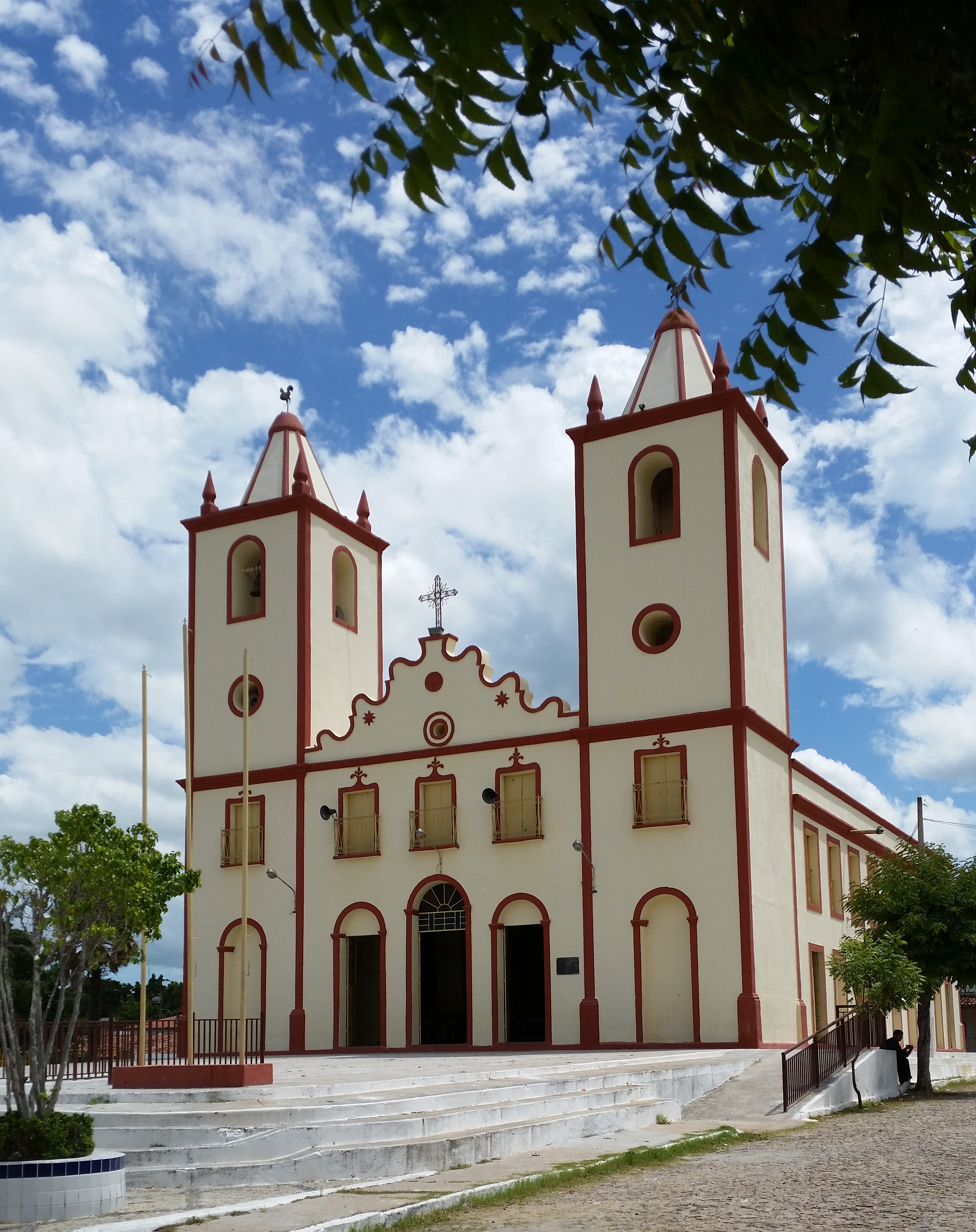

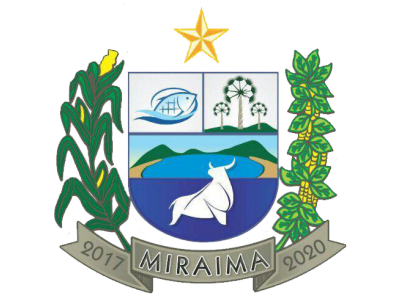
- Coat of arms
- Interactive map of Miraíma
- Country: Brazil
- Region: Nordeste
- State: Ceará
- Mesoregion: Noroeste Cearense

Population (2020)
  - Total: 13,894
- Time zone: UTC−3 (BRT)

Miraíma is a municipality in the state of Ceará in the Northeast region of Brazil.

== See also ==
- List of municipalities in Ceará
