= Peter Ademo =

Nigerian footballer (born 2003)

Personal information
- Full name: Peter Oluwaseun Ademo
- Date of birth: 11 January 2003 (age 23)
- Place of birth: Lagos, Nigeria
- Height: 1.84 m (6 ft 0 in)
- Position: Defensive midfielder

Team information
- Current team: Zaragoza

Youth career
- –2021: Real Sapphire
- 2021–2022: Daugavpils

Senior career*
Years	Team	Apps	(Gls)
2022–2023	Daugavpils	0	(0)
2022	→ Dainava (loan)	6	(0)
2023–2024	Dainava	18	(1)
2023–2024	→ Sheriff Tiraspol (loan)	6	(1)
2024–2026	Sheriff Tiraspol	42	(5)
2025	→ Rapid București (loan)	6	(0)
2026–	Zaragoza	0	(0)
- * Club domestic league appearances and goals as of 17 May 2026

Peter Oluwaseun Ademo (born 11 January 2003) is a Nigerian professional footballer who plays as a defensive midfielder for Spanish club Real Zaragoza.

== Career ==
Ademo was born in Lagos, and began playing football at the Real Sapphire youth academy. In 2021, he moved to Europe and joined Latvian side Daugavpils, being initially a member of the reserve side before being loaned out to Dainava in Lithuania in March 2022.

Ademo signed a permanent deal with Dainava in January 2023, before switching teams and countries again in July of that year, signing for Sheriff Tiraspol in Moldova on loan. In July 2024, he signed a permanent deal with the latter club.

On 11 February 2025, Ademo was loaned to Romanian side Rapid București unti June. Rarely used, he subsequently returned to Sheriff before agreeing to a four-year contract with Real Zaragoza in the Spanish Primera Federación on 8 June 2026.

== Honours ==
Dainava

- I Lyga: 2022

Sheriff Tiraspol

- Cupa Moldovei: 2025–26
