= 2023 Clube Náutico Capibaribe season =

Náutico
2023 season
- Chairman: Diógenes Braga
- Manager: Dado Cavalcanti; Pedro Gama (c); Otávio Augusto (c); Fernando Marchiori; Bruno Pivetti
- Stadium: Estádio dos Aflitos
- Série C: 10th
- Pernambucano: Quarter-finals
- Copa do Brasil: Third round
- Copa do Nordeste: Quarter-final
- Top goalscorer: League: Souza (4); All: Souza (11)
Home colours	Away colours	Third colours

The 2023 season was Náutico's 123rd season in the club's history. Náutico competed in the Campeonato Pernambucano, Copa do Nordeste, Série C and Copa do Brasil.

== Squad ==
Note: Flags indicate national team as defined under FIFA eligibility rules; some limited exceptions apply. Players may hold more than one non-FIFA nationality.

No.	Pos.	Nation	Player
12	GK	BRA	Bruno Lopes
26	GK	BRA	Gabriel Leite
1	GK	BRA	Vagner
4	DF	BRA	Victor Ferraz
14	DF	BRA	Denílson
6	DF	BRA	Diego Matos
3	DF	BRA	Odivan
30	DF	BRA	Diego Ferreira
13	DF	BRA	Rennan Siqueira
21	DF	BRA	Danilo Cardoso
3	DF	BRA	Joécio

No.	Pos.	Nation	Player
21	DF	BRA	Richardson
5	MF	BRA	Jean Mangabeira
18	MF	BRA	Nathan Lourenço
23	MF	BRA	Elton
18	MF	BRA	Fernando Neto
2	MF	BRA	Yago Ferreira
15	FW	BRA	Kayon
23	FW	BRA	Thiaguinho
22	FW	BRA	Berguinho
99	FW	BRA	Ribamar
17	FW	BRA	Maxwell

== Statistics ==
=== Overall ===
Games played	45 (13 Pernambucano, 9 Copa do Nordeste, 4 Copa do Brasil, 19 Série C)
Games won	20 (7 Pernambucano, 4 Copa do Nordeste, 3 Copa do Brasil, 6 Série C)
Games drawn	15 (5 Pernambucano, 1 Copa do Nordeste, 0 Copa do Brasil, 9 Série C)
Games lost	10 (1 Pernambucano, 4 Copa do Nordeste, 1 Copa do Brasil, 4 Série C)
Goals scored	63
Goals conceded	50
Goal difference	+13
Best results (goal difference)	4–0 (A) v Íbis - Pernambucano - 2023.03.15
Worst result (goal difference)	0–3 (A) v Aparecidense - Série C - 2023.05.13
Top scorer	Souza (11)

Source: Náutico official website

=== Goalscorers ===
Place	Position	Nationality	Number	Name	Campeonato Pernambucano	Copa do Nordeste	Copa do Brasil	Série C	Total
1	MF	(Brazil)	8	Souza	5	2	0	4	11
2	DF	(Brazil)	4	Victor Ferraz	1	4	0	2	7
3	MF	(Brazil)	7	Gabriel Santiago	2	0	1	2	5
3	FW	(Brazil)	9	Júlio	3	2	0	0	5
3	MF	(Brazil)	14	Matheus Carvalho	4	0	0	1	5
4	FW	(Brazil)	9	Jael	1	0	0	3	4
4	MF	(Colombia)	11	Paul Villero	2	0	0	2	4
5	FW	(Brazil)	22	Berguinho	0	0	0	3	3
5	MF	(Brazil)	5	Jean Mangabeira	0	1	0	2	3
5	FW	(Brazil)	20	Kayon	1	1	1	0	3
6	DF	(Brazil)	2	Anilson	2	0	0	0	2
6	DF	(Brazil)	14	Denílson	0	0	1	1	2
6	FW	(Brazil)	99	Ribamar	0	0	0	2	2
7	MF	(Brazil)	16	Alisson Santos	0	0	0	1	1
7	DF	(Brazil)	6	Diego Matos	0	1	0	0	1
7	MF	(Paraguay)	22	Juan Gauto	0	0	0	1	1
7	FW	(Brazil)	17	Maxwell	0	0	0	1	1
7	MF	(Brazil)	18	Nathan Lourenço	0	0	1	0	1
7	FW	(Brazil)	15	Tagarela	0	1	0	0	1
				Own goals	0	1	0	0	1
				Total	21	13	4	25	63

=== Managers performance ===
Name	Nationality	From	To	P	W	D	L	GF	GA	Avg%	Ref
Dado Cavalcanti	Brazil	7 January 2023	13 May 2023	28	15	6	7	40	30	60%	
Pedro Gama (c)	Brazil	26 February 2023	26 February 2023	1	0	0	1	1	2	0%	
Otávio Augusto (c)	Brazil	22 May 2023	27 May 2023	2	1	1	0	3	1	66%	
Fernando Marchiori	Brazil	3 June 2023	13 August 2023	12	4	6	2	15	13	50%	
Bruno Pivetti	Brazil	19 August 2023	26 August 2023	2	0	2	0	4	4	33%	

(c) Indicates the caretaker manager

== Official Competitions ==
=== Campeonato Pernambucano ===
==== First stage ====
7 January 2023 1	Central	2–1	Náutico	Caruaru
16:30 (UTC-3)	Douglas Bomba 17'; Leandro Costa 69'	Report	Matheus Carvalho 33'	Stadium: Estádio Luiz José de Lacerda (Lacerdão); Attendance: 2,899; Referee: Tiago Nascimento dos Santos

11 January 2023 2	Náutico	2–0	Caruaru City	Recife
19:00 (UTC-3)	Souza 74'; Matheus Carvalho 87'	Report		Stadium: Estádio Eládio de Barros Carvalho (Aflitos); Referee: Diego Fernando Silva de Lima

15 January 2023 3	Santa Cruz	3–3	Náutico	Recife
16:30 (UTC-3)	Yan Oliveira 6'; Anilson 20' (o.g.); Arthur 43'	Report	Júlio 15', 37'; Anilson 53'	Stadium: Estádio José do Rego Maciel (Arruda); Attendance: 15,389; Referee: Rodrigo Jose Pereira de Lima

18 January 2023 4	Náutico	2–0	Belo Jardim	Recife
19:00 (UTC-3)	Matheus Carvalho 49'; Souza 51'	Report		Stadium: Estádio Eládio de Barros Carvalho (Aflitos); Referee: Michelangelo Martins de Almeida Junior

25 January 2023 5	Retrô	1–1	Náutico	Recife
20:00 (UTC-3)	Albano 90+3'	Report	Souza 56' (pen.)	Stadium: Estádio José do Rego Maciel (Arruda); Attendance: 1,932; Referee: Diego Fernando

30 January 2023 6	Náutico	0–0	Porto	Recife
20:00 (UTC-3)		Report		Stadium: Estádio Eládio de Barros Carvalho (Aflitos); Referee: Hugo Soares Dias Figueiredo

7 February 2023 7	Afogados da Ingazeira	0–1	Náutico	Afogados da Ingazeira
20:00 (UTC-3)		Report	Gabriel Santiago 15'	Stadium: Estádio Valdemar Viana de Araújo (Vianão); Referee: Luiz Claudio Sobral

11 February 2023 8	Náutico	2–2	Sport	Recife
20:30 (UTC-3)	Gabriel Santiago 46'; Victor Ferraz 90+2'	Report	Ewerthon 31'; Labandeira 62'	Stadium: Estádio Eládio de Barros Carvalho (Aflitos); Attendance: 5,226; Referee: José Washington da Silva

12 March 2023 9	Náutico	2–0	Salgueiro	Recife
16:30 (UTC-3)	Anilson 40'; Matheus Carvalho 48'	Report		Stadium: Estádio Eládio de Barros Carvalho (Aflitos); Attendance: 6,022; Referee: Nairon Pereira de Lira

15 March 2023 10	Íbis	0–4	Náutico	Recife
20:00 (UTC-3)		Report	Villero 7', 12'; Kayon 46'; Jael 68'	Stadium: Estádio José do Rego Maciel (Arruda); Attendance: 514; Referee: Gilberto Rodrigues Castro Junior

18 March 2023 11	Maguary	0–1	Náutico	Bonito
16:30 (UTC-3)		Report	Souza 8' (pen.)	Stadium: Estádio Arthur Tavares de Melo; Referee: Tiago Nascimento dos Santos

1 April 2023 12	Náutico	1–0	Petrolina	Recife
16:30 (UTC-3)	Júlio 11'	Report		Stadium: Estádio Eládio de Barros Carvalho (Aflitos); Referee: Rodrigo Jose Pereira de Lima

==== Quarter-final ====
5 April 2023	Náutico	1–1 (13–14 p)	Salgueiro	Recife
20:00 (UTC-3)	Souza 45+7'	Report	Robinho 71'	Stadium: Estádio Eládio de Barros Carvalho (Aflitos); Attendance: 6,502; Referee: Michelangelo Martins de Almeida Junior
	Penalties
	Souza (penalty scored); Júlio (penalty scored); Diego Matos (penalty scored); Odivan (penalty missed); Paul Villero (penalty scored); Fernando Neto (penalty scored); Mateus Cocão (penalty scored); Régis Tosatti (penalty scored); Diego Ferreira (penalty scored); Vágner (penalty missed); Paulo Miranda (penalty scored); Souza (penalty scored); Júlio (penalty scored); Diego Matos (penalty missed); Paul Villero (penalty scored); Fernando Neto (penalty scored); Mateus Cocão (penalty missed)		(penalty scored) Anderson Recife; (penalty scored) Gaspar; (penalty scored) Denilton; (penalty missed) Bartolomeu; (penalty scored) Robinho; (penalty scored) Palominha; (penalty scored) Wesley; (penalty scored) Gabriel Fonseca; (penalty scored) Léo Ceará; (penalty missed) Pedro Gustavo; (penalty scored) Éverton; (penalty scored) Anderson Recife; (penalty scored) Gaspar; (penalty missed) Denilton; (penalty scored) Robinho; (penalty scored) Palominha; (penalty scored) Gabriel Fonseca

==== Record ====
Final Position	Points	Matches	Wins	Draws	Losses	Goals For	Goals Away	Win%
5th	26	13	7	5	1	21	9	66%

=== Copa do Nordeste ===
22 January 2023 1	Atlético de Alagoinhas	0–1	Náutico	Alagoinhas
16:00 (UTC-3)		Report	Júlio 10'	Stadium: Estádio Municipal Antônio de Figueiredo Carneiro; Attendance: 1,404; Referee: Léo Simão Holanda

4 February 2023 2	Náutico	2–2	CRB	Recife
17:30 (UTC-3)	Souza 33'; Kayon 75'	Report	Renato 55'; Diogo Silva 90'	Stadium: Estádio Eládio de Barros Carvalho (Aflitos); Attendance: 5,642; Referee: Diego Pombo Lopez

15 February 2023 3	Náutico	2–0	Fluminense–PI	Recife
21:30 (UTC-3)	Diego Matos 21'; Júlio 45+3'	Report		Stadium: Estádio Eládio de Barros Carvalho (Aflitos); Attendance: 3,729; Referee: Tiago Ramos de Oliveira

18 February 2023 4	Sampaio Corrêa	1–0	Náutico	São Luís
19:45 (UTC-3)	Joecio 87'	Report		Stadium: Estádio Governador João Castelo (Castelão); Attendance: 755; Referee: Adriano Barros Carneiro

23 February 2023 5	Vitória	2–3	Náutico	Salvador
19:00 (UTC-3)	Osvaldo 3'; Thiago Lopes 18'	Report	Jean Mangabeira 12'; Railan 60' (o.g.); Victor Ferraz 75'	Stadium: Estádio Manoel Barradas (Barradão); Attendance: 4,357; Referee: Rafael Carlos Salgueiro Lima

26 February 2023 7	Fortaleza	2–1	Náutico	Fortaleza
19:00 (UTC-3)	Romero 13'; Lucero 31'	Report	Jael 90+4'	Stadium: Estádio Presidente Vargas; Attendance: 11,219; Referee: Paulo José Souza Mourão

4 March 2023 6	Náutico	0–2	Sport	Recife
17:30 (UTC-3)		Report	Fabinho 62'; Luciano Juba 90+7'	Stadium: Estádio Eládio de Barros Carvalho (Aflitos); Attendance: 7,394; Referee: Caio Max Augusto Vieira

22 March 2023 8	Náutico	3–2	Ferroviário	Recife
21:30 (UTC-3)	Jael 25', 42'; Souza 64'	Report	Kiuan 77', 81'	Stadium: Estádio Eládio de Barros Carvalho (Aflitos); Attendance: 5,348; Referee: Antônio Dib Moraes de Sousa

==== Quarter-final ====
26 March 2023	ABC	3–1	Náutico	Natal
15:30 (UTC-3)	Felipe Garcia 13', 77'; Souza 45+4' (o.g.)	Report	Tagarela 88'	Stadium: Estádio Maria Lamas Farache (Frasqueirão); Attendance: 0 Referee: Léo Simão Holanda

==== Record ====
Final Position	Points	Matches	Wins	Draws	Losses	Goals For	Goals Away	Win%
5th	13	9	4	1	4	13	14	48%

=== Copa do Brasil ===
==== First round ====
1 March 2023	São Bernardo	0–1	Náutico	São Bernardo do Campo
20:00 (UTC-3)		Report	Denilson 4'	Stadium: Estádio 1º de Maio; Attendance: 3,179; Referee: Paulo Roberto Alves Junior

==== Second round ====
9 March 2023	Náutico	2–1	Vila Nova	Recife
19:00 (UTC-3)	Kayon 12'; Nathan 90+8'	Report	Neto Pessoa 90'	Stadium: Estádio Eládio de Barros Carvalho (Aflitos); Attendance: 8,345; Referee: Paulo César Zanovelli da Silva

==== Third round ====
13 April 2023 First leg	Náutico	1–0	Cruzeiro	Recife
19:00 UTC−3	Gabriel Santiago 87'	Report		Stadium: Estádio Eládio de Barros Carvalho (Aflitos); Attendance: 6,435; Referee: Marcelo de Lima Henrique

25 April 2023 Second leg	Cruzeiro	2–0	Náutico	Belo Horizonte
19:00 UTC−3	William 54'; Richard 89'	Report		Stadium: Estádio Raimundo Sampaio (Independência); Attendance: 21,675; Referee: Luiz Flávio de Oliveira

==== Record ====
Final Position	Points	Matches	Wins	Draws	Losses	Goals For	Goals Away	Win%
20th	9	4	3	0	1	4	3	75%

=== Série C ===
==== Table ====
Pos	Team	Pld	W	D	L	GF	GA	GD	Pts	Qualification or relegation
8	São Bernardo	19	7	8	4	20	17	+3	29	Advance to Second stage
9	Confiança	19	8	4	7	23	26	−3	28	
10	Náutico	19	6	9	4	25	24	+1	27	
11	Remo	19	6	7	6	20	18	+2	25	
12	CSA	19	5	9	5	15	13	+2	24	

Source: CBF
Rules for classification: 1) points; 2) wins; 3) goal difference; 4) goals scored; 5) fewest red cards; 6) fewest yellow cards; 7) draw.

==== First stage ====
2 May 2023 1	Manaus	2–1	Náutico	Manaus
21:30 (UTC-4)	Douglas 81'; Cardoso 90+3'	Report	Jean Mangabeira 32'	Stadium: Arena da Amazônia; Attendance: 4,691; Referee: Paulo Henrique de Melo Salmazio

6 May 2023 2	Náutico	2–1	São José	Recife
19:00 (UTC-3)	Jael 35'; Gabriel Santiago 52'	Report	José Welinton 28'	Stadium: Estádio Eládio de Barros Carvalho (Aflitos); Attendance: 7,460; Referee: Paulo Henrique Schleich Vollkopf

13 May 2023 3	Aparecidense	3–0	Náutico	Aparecida de Goiânia
19:00 (UTC-3)	Moraes 47'; Du Fernandes 73'; Jackson 90+7'	Report		Stadium: Estádio Municipal Annibal Batista de Toledo; Attendance: 581; Referee: Felipe Fernandes de Lima

22 May 2023 4	Náutico	3–1	Floresta	Recife
20:00 (UTC-3)	Souza 5'; Gabriel Santiago 32'; Gauto 87'	Report	Marllon 38'	Stadium: Estádio Eládio de Barros Carvalho (Aflitos); Attendance: 5,010; Referee: Ivan da Silva Guimaraes Junior

27 May 2023 5	Náutico	0–0	América–RN	Recife
19:00 (UTC-3)		Report		Stadium: Estádio Eládio de Barros Carvalho (Aflitos); Attendance: 8,833; Referee: Leonardo Ferreira Lima

3 June 2023 6	Pouso Alegre	0–1	Náutico	Pouso Alegre
16:30 (UTC-3)		Report	Denilson 19'	Stadium: Estádio Municipal Irmão Gino Maria Rossi (Manduzão); Attendance: 3,682; Referee: Arthur Gomes Rabelo

6 June 2023 7	Náutico	2–0	Volta Redonda	Recife
20:00 (UTC-3)	Jael 47'; Souza 58'	Report		Stadium: Estádio Eládio de Barros Carvalho (Aflitos); Attendance: 7,349; Referee: Murilo Francisco Misson Junior

12 June 2023 8	Confiança	2–2	Náutico	Aracaju
21:30 (UTC-3)	Edison Negueba 49'; Salazar 90+3'	Report	Souza 5', 32'	Stadium: Estádio Lourival Baptista (Batistão); Attendance: 2,394; Referee: José Mendonca da Silva Junior

19 June 2023 9	Botafogo–PB	1–1	Náutico	João Pessoa
20:00 (UTC-3)	Bismark 52'	Report	Jael 38'	Stadium: Estádio José Américo de Almeida Filho (Almeidão); Attendance: 6,204; Referee: Alexandre Vargas Tavares de Jesus

28 June 2023 10	Náutico	0–1	Amazonas	Recife
21:30 (UTC-3)		Report	Sassá 42'	Stadium: Estádio Eládio de Barros Carvalho (Aflitos); Attendance: 4,699; Referee: Gustavo Ervino Bauermann

3 July 2023 11	Náutico	1–0	Altos	Recife
20:00 (UTC-3)	Berguinho 37'	Report		Stadium: Estádio Eládio de Barros Carvalho (Aflitos); Attendance: 5,169; Referee: Adriano Barros Carneiro

10 July 2023 12	Ypiranga	3–3	Náutico	Erechim
20:00 (UTC-3)	Erick 17'; Jhonatan 27'; Wiliam Barbio 61'	Report	Paul 31'; Alisson 90'; Victor Ferraz 90+3'	Stadium: Estádio Olímpico Colosso da Lagoa; Attendance: 105; Referee: Davi de Oliveira Lacerda

15 July 2023 13	Náutico	2–1	Figueirense	Recife
16:30 (UTC-3)	Victor Ferraz 29'; Jean Mangabeira 38'	Report	Gustavo Franca 60'	Stadium: Estádio Eládio de Barros Carvalho (Aflitos); Attendance: 8,818; Referee: Antonio Dib Moraes de Sousa

23 July 2023 14	Náutico	0–0	Remo	Recife
19:00 (UTC-3)		Report		Stadium: Estádio Eládio de Barros Carvalho (Aflitos); Attendance: 10,612; Referee: Tiago Ramos de Oliveira

29 July 2023 15	Operário	1–1	Náutico	Ponta Grossa
16:00 (UTC-3)	Felipe Augusto 22'	Report	Paul 63'	Stadium: Estádio Germano Krüger; Attendance: 4,756; Referee: Douglas Marques das Flores

6 August 2023 16	Náutico	0–0	CSA	Recife
16:00 (UTC-3)		Report		Stadium: Estádio Eládio de Barros Carvalho (Aflitos); Attendance: 15,323; Referee: Dyorgines Jose Padovani de Andrade

13 August 2023 17	Paysandu	4–2	Náutico	Belém
16:00 (UTC-3)	Ronaldo Mendes 35'; Kevyn Lucas 63'; Vinícius Leite 78'; Roger 90+4'	Report	Berguinho 11', 22'	Stadium: Estádio Leônidas Sodré de Castro (Curuzu); Attendance: 15,941; Referee: Felipe Fernandes de Lima

19 August 2023 18	Brusque	2–2	Náutico	Brusque
16:00 (UTC-3)	Madison 42'; Wallace 69'	Report	Ribamar 25', 51'	Stadium: Estádio Augusto Bauer; Attendance: 1,715; Referee: Antonio Dib Moraes de Sousa

26 August 2023 19	Náutico	2–2	São Bernardo	Recife
16:00 (UTC-3)	Maxwell 70'; Matheus Carvalho 89'	Report	João Carlos 36'; Hugo 66'	Stadium: Estádio Eládio de Barros Carvalho (Aflitos); Attendance: 18,314; Referee: Bruno Arleu de Araujo

==== Record ====
Final Position	Points	Matches	Wins	Draws	Losses	Goals For	Goals Away	Win%
10th	27	19	6	9	4	25	24	47%
