= Fernando Neto (footballer, born 2003) =

Brazilian footballer

Personal information
- Full name: Fernando Antônio Evangelista da Silva Neto
- Date of birth: 18 June 2003 (age 23)
- Place of birth: Recife, Brazil
- Height: 1.78 m (5 ft 10 in)
- Position: Attacking midfielder

Team information
- Current team: São José-SP
- Number: 17

Youth career
- ADESPE
- 2019–2023: Náutico

Senior career*
Years	Team	Apps	(Gls)
2023	Náutico	10	(0)
2024	Treze	0	(0)
2024–2025	Gomel	19	(3)
2025	Sheriff Tiraspol	3	(0)
2025	Sheriff-2 Tiraspol	1	(1)
2025–2026	Varnsdorf	0	(0)
2026	São-Carlense	18	(4)
2026–	São José-SP	0	(0)
- * Club domestic league appearances and goals as of 13:41, 7 July 2026 (UTC)

Fernando Antônio Evangelista da Silva Neto (born 18 June 2003), known as Fernando Neto, is a Brazilian professional footballer who plays for São José-SP. Mainly an attacking midfielder, he can also play as a winger.

== Career ==
Born in Recife, Pernambuco, Fernando Neto finished his formation with Náutico, having joined their youth categories in 2019. He made his first team debut on 7 January 2023, starting in a 2–1 Campeonato Pernambucano away loss to Central.

Despite being regularly used in the state league, Fernando Neto subsequently lost space at Timbu, and returned to the under-20 team before moving to Treze on 24 February 2024. On 29 August, after just one match, he moved abroad and signed for FC Gomel in Belarus.

On 20 June 2025, Fernando Neto was announced at Moldovan side Sheriff Tiraspol. On 25 August, after four matches, he left for Czech club Varnsdorf.

On 14 January 2026, Fernando Neto returned to his home country, after being announced at Campeonato Paulista Série A4 side São-Carlense. On 6 July, he joined São José-SP for the Copa Paulista.

== Career statistics ==
As of 7 July 2026

Club	Season	League			State League		Cup		Continental		Other		Total	
Club	Season	Division	Apps	Goals	Apps	Goals	Apps	Goals	Apps	Goals	Apps	Goals	Apps	Goals
Náutico	2023	Série C	1	0	9	0	0	0	—		3 (Note: Appearance(s) in Copa do Nordeste)	0	13	0
Treze	2024	Série D	0	0	0	0	0	0	—		1	0	1	0
Gomel	2024	Belarusian Premier League	10	2	—		—		—		—		10	2
Gomel	2025	Belarusian Premier League	9	1	—		—		—		—		9	1
Gomel	Total		19	3	—		—		—		—		19	3
Sheriff Tiraspol	2025–26	Moldovan Liga	3	0	—		—		1 (Note: Appearance(s) in UEFA Europa League)	0	—		4	0
Sheriff-2 Tiraspol	2025–26	Moldovan Liga 1	1	1	—		—		—		—		1	1
Varnsdorf	2025–26	Bohemian Football League	0	0	—		—		—		—		0	0
São-Carlense	2026	Paulista A4	—		18	4	—		—		—		18	4
São José-SP	2026	Paulista A2	—		—		—		—		0	0	0	0
Career total			24	4	27	4	0	0	1	0	4	0	56	8

== Honours ==
Náutico

- Campeonato Pernambucano: 2021, 2022
