= Daniel Danu =

Moldovan footballer (born 2002)

- Danu with Moldova U21 in 2023

Personal information
- Date of birth: 26 August 2002 (age 24)
- Place of birth: Bălți, Moldova
- Height: 1.77 m (5 ft 10 in)
- Position: Midfielder

Team information
- Current team: Rudar Prijedor

Youth career
- –2018: Zaria Bălți

Senior career*
Years	Team	Apps	(Gls)
2018–2024	Bălți (Note: Does not include matches from Moldovan Liga 1)	70	(4)
2024–2025	Chindia Târgoviște	26	(5)
2025–2026	CSM Olimpia Satu Mare	6	(0)
2026	Sheriff Tiraspol	5	(0)
2026–	Rudar Prijedor	0	(0)

International career^{‡}
2018	Moldova U17 (Note: Only official UEFA matches included)	3	(1)
2019	Moldova U19	3	(0)
2021–2024	Moldova U21	11	(0)
2024–	Moldova	1	(0)
- * Club domestic league appearances and goals as of 24 August 2026 ‡ National team caps and goals as of 19 November 2024

Daniel Danu (born 26 August 2002) is a Moldovan professional footballer who plays as a midfielder for First League of RS club Rudar Prijedor.

== Club career ==
Danu started his career at Zaria Bălți, which was rebranded as FC Bălți in 2020. In December 2018, he was on trials for the under-19 team of Elche CF. He joined Chindia Târgoviște in August 2024.

== International career ==
In February 2020, Danu played for Moldova U19 in the "Roma Caput Mundi" tournament, which reached the final. He has played for Moldova under-17, under-19, and under-21 in the qualifying campaigns for the European Championships. He was called up for the senior team multiple times since September 2023. On 19 November 2024 Danu made his debut for the senior team, as a 70th-minute substitute in a friendly against Gibraltar, in which he got sent off after a second yellow card in stoppage time.

== Career statistics ==
=== International ===
As of match played 19 November 2024

Appearances and goals by national team and year
National team	Year	Apps	Goals
Moldova
Moldova	2024	1	0
Total		1	0

== Honours ==
FC Bălți

- Divizia A: 2020–21
- Cupa Moldovei runner-up: 2022–23
