= Qays Ghanem =

Israeli association footballer

Personal information
- Full name: Qays Ghanem
- Date of birth: 31 December 1997 (age 28)
- Place of birth: Zemer, Israel
- Height: 1.83 m (6 ft 0 in)
- Position: Forward

Team information
- Current team: Sheriff Tiraspol
- Number: 14

Senior career*
Years	Team	Apps	(Gls)
2016–2019	Hapoel Ramat HaSharon	48	(10)
2018–2019	→ Hapoel Ra'anana	30	(7)
2019–2020	Hapoel Ra'anana	20	(1)
2020–2022	Hapoel Be'er Sheva	16	(1)
2021–2022	Hapoel Haifa	14	(2)
2022–2023	Hapoel Tel Aviv	22	(3)
2023–2025	Maccabi Bnei Reineh	48	(7)
2025–	Sheriff Tiraspol	13	(3)

International career
2018	Israel U21	1	(2)
- * Club domestic league appearances and goals as of 1 June 2026

Qays Ghanem (Arabic: قيس غانم, Hebrew: קייס גאנם; born 31 December 1997) is an Israeli professional footballer who plays as a forward for Moldovan Liga club Sheriff Tiraspol.

== Club career ==
On 7 June 2022 signed for Israeli Premier League club Hapoel Tel Aviv.

== Honours ==
Hapoel Be'er Sheva

- Israel State Cup: 2019–20, 2021–22
