= Bourama Fomba =

Romanian footballer

Personal information
- Date of birth: 10 July 1999 (age 27)
- Place of birth: Bamako, Mali
- Height: 1.86 m (6 ft 1 in)
- Position: Defender

Team information
- Current team: Sheriff Tiraspol
- Number: 35

Youth career
- Académie des Étoiles du Mandé

Senior career*
Years	Team	Apps	(Gls)
2018–2019	Étoiles du Mandé		
2019–2020	Ceahlăul Piatra Neamț	15	(2)
2020	→ Politehnica Iași (loan)	4	(0)
2020–2021	Chindia Târgoviște	16	(0)
2021	Oleksandriya	0	(0)
2022	Minsk	13	(0)
2022–2025	Levadia	68	(13)
2025–2026	Omonia Aradippou	16	(0)
2026–	Sheriff Tiraspol	10	(1)
- * Club domestic league appearances and goals as of 1 June 2026

Bourama Fomba (born 10 July 1999) is a Malian professional footballer who plays as a defender for Moldovan Liga club Sheriff Tiraspol. In his career, Fomba also played for Étoiles du Mandé, Ceahlăul Piatra Neamț and Politehnica Iași.
