= Vsevolod Nihaev =

Moldovan football player

Personal information
- Full name: Vsevolod Pavlovich Nikhayev
- Date of birth: 4 May 1999 (age 27)
- Place of birth: Moldova
- Height: 1.85 m (6 ft 1 in)
- Position: Midfielder

Team information
- Current team: Sheriff Tiraspol
- Number: 17

Youth career
- Sheriff Tiraspol

Senior career*
Years	Team	Apps	(Gls)
2018–2019	Sheriff Tiraspol	2	(0)
2019–2020	Dinamo-Auto	19	(0)
2020–2021	Okzhetpes	6	(0)
2021–2022	Akron Tolyatti	15	(0)
2022	Milsami Orhei	13	(1)
2023	Buxoro	24	(0)
2024	Isloch Minsk Raion	7	(0)
2024–2025	Petrocub Hîncești	5	(1)
2025–2026	Dacia Buiucani	17	(2)
2026–	Sheriff Tiraspol	4	(0)

International career
2015	Moldova U17	5	(2)
2016–2017	Moldova U19	10	(2)
2019	Moldova U21	4	(0)
- * Club domestic league appearances and goals as of 1 June 2026

Vsevolod Nihaev (born 4 May 1999) is a Moldovan football player who currently plays as a midfielder for Moldovan Liga club Sheriff Tiraspol. He also holds Russian citizenship as Vsevolod Pavlovich Nikhayev (Russian: Всеволод Павлович Нихаев).

== Club career ==
He made his debut in the Russian Football National League for FC Akron Tolyatti on 27 February 2021 in a game against FC Veles Moscow.

On 31 August 2024 Nihaev joined Petrocub Hîncești.
