= Emil Tîmbur =

Moldovan footballer

Personal information
- Date of birth: 21 July 1997 (age 29)
- Place of birth: Chișinău, Moldova
- Height: 1.85 m (6 ft 1 in)
- Position: Goalkeeper

Team information
- Current team: Sheriff Tiraspol
- Number: 1

Youth career
- Zimbru Chișinău

Senior career*
Years	Team	Apps	(Gls)
2013–2017	Zimbru-2 Chișinău	71	(0)
2014–2018	Zimbru Chișinău	22	(0)
2018–2019	Torpedo-BelAZ	0	(0)
2019–2024	Milsami Orhei	99	(0)
2024	Panevėžys	6	(0)
2025–2026	Milsami Orhei	26	(0)
2026–	Sheriff Tiraspol	10	(0)

International career^{‡}
2013	Moldova U17 (Note: Only official UEFA matches included)	1	(0)
2015	Moldova U19	1	(0)
2017–2018	Moldova U21	6	(0)
2022–	Moldova	4	(0)
- * Club domestic league appearances and goals as of 1 June 2026 ‡ National team caps and goals as of 9 June 2026

Emil Tîmbur (born 21 July 1997) is a Moldovan professional footballer who plays as a goalkeeper for Moldovan Liga club Sheriff Tiraspol and the Moldova national team.

== Club career ==
Tîmbur made his professional debut for Zimbru Chișinău in the Divizia Națională on 1 April 2017 against Milsami Orhei. He reached the final of the Moldovan Cup in his last season with the club. In August 2018 he joined the Belarusian side Torpedo-BelAZ. In July 2019 Tîmbur transferred to Politehnica Timișoara, but returned in Moldova to Milsami Orhei two months later. He has 113 appearances for the club in all competitions. On 13 June 2024 Panevėžys Club announced about the signing of Tîmbur.

== International career ==
Tîmbur has played for Moldova under-17, under-19, and under-21 in the qualifying campaigns for the European Championships. On 18 January 2022 he made his debut for the Moldova national football team as a substitute in the second half in a friendly with Uganda.

== Honours ==
Zimbru Chișinău

- Moldovan Cup runner-up: 2017–18
