= Nicolae Cebotari =

Moldovan footballer (born 1997)

Personal information
- Date of birth: 24 May 1997 (age 29)
- Place of birth: Chișinău, Moldova
- Height: 1.84 m (6 ft 0 in)
- Position: Goalkeeper

Team information
- Current team: Sheriff Tiraspol
- Number: 28

Youth career
- –2012: Dacia Buiucani
- 2012–2015: Academia Chișinău
- 2015–2017: União de Leiria

Senior career*
Years	Team	Apps	(Gls)
2012–2015	Academia Chișinău	16	(0)
2017	Botev Vratsa	0	(0)
2017–2020	Sfântul Gheorghe	27	(0)
2018	→ Sheriff Tiraspol (loan)	1	(0)
2020–2021	Petrolul Ploiești	3	(0)
2022–2023	Petrocub Hîncești	3	(0)
2023–2026	Zimbru Chișinău	48	(0)
2026–	Sheriff Tiraspol	0	(0)

International career^{‡}
2012–2013	Moldova U17	4	(0)
2014–2015	Moldova U18	4	(0)
2014–2015	Moldova U19	5	(0)
2015–2018	Moldova U21	7	(0)
2024–	Moldova	1	(0)
- * Club domestic league appearances and goals as of 12 March 2026 ‡ National team caps and goals as of 26 March 2024

Nicolae Cebotari (born 24 May 1997) is a Moldovan footballer who plays as a goalkeeper for Moldovan Liga club Sheriff Tiraspol, and the Moldova national team.

== International career ==
Cebotari made his debut for the senior Moldova national team on 26 March 2024 in a friendly against the Cayman Islands.

== Honours ==
Sheriff Tiraspol

- Divizia Națională: 2018
