= Mamady Diarra =

Spanish footballer (born 2000)

Personal information
- Full name: Mamady Diarra
- Date of birth: 26 June 2000 (age 26)
- Place of birth: Bamako, Mali
- Height: 1.80 m (5 ft 11 in)
- Position: Right winger

Team information
- Current team: Muğlaspor

Youth career
- Yeelen Olympique

Senior career*
Years	Team	Apps	(Gls)
2018–2019	Yeelen Olympique		
2019–2023	Cádiz B	93	(7)
2022–2023	Cádiz	2	(0)
2023–2025	Győr	52	(6)
2025–2026	Sheriff Tiraspol	12	(2)
2026	Hapoel Petah Tikva	16	(2)
2026–	Muğlaspor	0	(0)

International career
2015	Mali U17	3	(0)
2019	Mali U20	1	(0)
- * Club domestic league appearances and goals as of 24 July 2026

Mamady Diarra (born 26 June 2000) is a Malian footballer who plays as a right winger for Turkish club Muğlaspor.

== Club career ==
Born in Bamako, Diarra began his career with local side Yeelen Olympique. On 2 May 2019, he signed a four-year contract with Spanish side Cádiz CF, being initially assigned to the reserves in Segunda División B.

Diarra made his senior debut for Cádiz B on 1 September 2019, coming on as a late substitute in a 2–1 away loss against Yeclano Deportivo. He scored his first senior goal on 27 February 2022, netting the winner in a 1–0 Segunda División RFEF win over UD Las Palmas Atlético.

Diarra made his first team – and La Liga – debut on 14 August 2022, replacing Joseba Zaldúa in a 1–0 loss at Real Sociedad.

On 1 July 2025, Moldovan Liga club Sheriff Tiraspol announced the signing of Diarra.

On 22 January 2026, Israeli Premier League club Hapoel Petah Tikva on a free transfer from Sheriff Tiraspol.

Diarra joined the Turkish 1. Lig club Muğlaspor on 24 July 2026.
