= Dhoraso Klas =

Surinamese footballer (born 2001)

Personal information
- Full name: Dhoraso Moreo Klas
- Date of birth: 30 January 2001 (age 25)
- Place of birth: Amsterdam, Netherlands
- Height: 1.81 m (5 ft 11 in)
- Position: Midfielder

Team information
- Current team: Sheriff Tiraspol
- Number: 26

Youth career
- 2015–2017: Brabant United
- 2017–2020: Den Bosch

Senior career*
Years	Team	Apps	(Gls)
2018–2020	Jong Den Bosch	31	(6)
2020–2021	Den Bosch	27	(2)
2021–2024	ADO Den Haag	74	(5)
2024	Deinze	3	(0)
2025–2026	Iberia 1999	28	(1)
2026–	Sheriff Tiraspol	25	(4)

International career^{‡}
2023–	Suriname	18	(2)
- * Club domestic league appearances and goals as of 15:18, 26 October 2026 (UTC) ‡ National team caps and goals as of 3 October 2026

Dhoraso Moreo Klas (born 30 January 2001) is a professional footballer who plays as a midfielder for Moldovan Liga club Sheriff Tiraspol. Born in the Netherlands, he plays for the Suriname national team.

== Career ==
=== Den Bosch ===
Born in Amsterdam, Klas played in the youth system of FC Den Bosch, where he played one year above his age group and each day traveled 90 kilometres (56 mi) in public transport from Amsterdam to 's-Hertogenbosch to train and play for the youth teams. Already in the 2017–18 season, Klas was included in the first-team squad, but eventually did not make a senior appearance.

In the summer of 2020, Klas was officially promoted to the first team after having mainly played for the under-21 team for two years. He made his debut for FC Den Bosch in the Eerste Divisie on 6 September 2020, in a 2–1 home win over FC Dordrecht, coming on as a 78th-minute substitute for Jizz Hornkamp. On 22 September, he scored his professional goal as a starter in the home match against MVV.

On 18 April 2021, it was announced that Klas' contract with Den Bosch had been terminated after he had informed the club that he wanted to play elsewhere after initially having agreed on a contract extension.

=== ADO Den Haag ===
In July 2021, he moved to ADO Den Haag on a three-year contract. He made his competitive debut for the club on 8 August 2021, starting in a 2–0 win over Jong Ajax. On 10 September 2021, Klas scored his first goal for ADO, securing a late 3–3 equalizer away against TOP Oss.

He left the club at the end of the 2023–24 season, as his contract was not extended.

=== Deinze ===
On 27 June 2024, Klas signed a two-year contract with Deinze in Belgium. He left the club in December 2024 after Deinze was declared bankrupt and ceased operations.

== Personal life ==
Born in the Netherlands, Klas is of Surinamese descent. In June 2023, he switched to play for the Suriname national team for a set of 2023 CONCACAF Gold Cup qualification matches.

== Career statistics ==
=== Club ===
As of match played 3 May 2024

Appearances and goals by club, season and competition
Club	Season	League			National Cup		Continental		Other		Total	
Club	Season	Division	Apps	Goals	Apps	Goals	Apps	Goals	Apps	Goals	Apps	Goals
Jong Den Bosch	2018–19	Vierde Divisie	18	2	—		—		—		18	2
Jong Den Bosch	2019–20	Beloften Eredivisie	13	4	—		—		—		13	4
Jong Den Bosch	Total		31	6	—		—		—		31	6
Den Bosch	2020–21	Eerste Divisie	27	2	1	0	—		—		28	2
ADO Den Haag	2021–22	Eerste Divisie	35	4	3	0	—		6 (Note: Appearances in Promotion play-offs)	2	44	6
ADO Den Haag	2022–23	Eerste Divisie	19	0	3	0	—		—		22	0
ADO Den Haag	2023–24	Eerste Divisie	20	1	1	0	—		—		21	1
ADO Den Haag	Total		74	5	7	0	—		6	2	87	7
Career total			132	13	8	0	0	0	6	2	146	15

=== International ===
As of match played 13 November 2025

Appearances and goals by national team and year
National team	Year	Apps	Goals
Suriname	2023	3	0
Suriname	2024	1	0
Suriname	2025	10	2
Total		14	2

Scores and results list Suriname's goal tally first.

No.	Date	Venue	Opponent	Score	Result	Competition
1.	8 September 2025	Cuscatlán Stadium, San Salvador, El Salvador	El Salvador	2–1	2–1	2026 FIFA World Cup qualification
2.	13 November 2025	Franklin Essed Stadion, Paramaribo, Suriname	El Salvador	4–0	4–0	2026 FIFA World Cup qualification
