= 2023–24 FC Sheriff Tiraspol season =

Sheriff Tiraspol
2023–24 season
- Chairman: Viktor Gushan
- Manager: Roberto Bordin (until 6 October); Viktor Mikhailov (Acting) (6–11 October); Roman Pylypchuk (11 October – 19 March); Viktor Mikhailov (Acting) (19 March – 7 May); Yuriy Hura (from 7 May)
- Stadium: Sheriff Stadium
- Divizia Naţională: 2nd
- Moldovan Cup: Semifinal
- UEFA Champions League: Second Qualifying Round
- UEFA Europa League: Group stage
- Top goalscorer: League: Amine Talal (8); All: Amine Talal (11)
- Highest home attendance: 7,933 vs Maccabi Haifa (26 July 2023)
- Lowest home attendance: 376 vs Dacia Buiucani (21 April 2024)
- Average home league attendance: 720 (18 May 2024)
Home colours	Away colours

The 2023–24 season was FC Sheriff Tiraspol's 27th season, and their 26th in the Divizia Naţională, the top-flight of Moldovan football.

== Season events ==
On 12 June, Sheriff announced that Dumitru Celeadnic had left the club after his contract was not renewed, whilst Michael López had also left the club after his contract was terminated by mutual consent. On the same day, Sheriff announced the signing of Adamou Djibo from ASN Nigelec.

On 15 June, Sheriff announced the signing of Didier Bueno on loan from Independiente Medellín.

On 26 June, Sheriff announced the signings of João Paulo Fernandes, Konstantinos Apostolakis, Peter Ademo, Victor Străistari and Vinícius Paiva.

On 27 June, Sheriff announced the signing of Cristian Tovar from Deportivo Pasto.

On 3 July, Sheriff announced the return of Henrique Luvannor.

On 5 July, Sheriff announced the signing of Jerome Ngom Mbekeli from Beveren. The following day, 6 July, Sheriff announced the signings of Cedric Ngah from Sfîntul Gheorghe and David Ankeye from ES Hammam Sousse.

On 19 July, Sheriff announced the signing of Alejandro Artunduaga from Once Caldas.

On 11 August, Berkay Vardar joined Sheriff on loan from Beşiktaş for the season.

On 30 August, Sheriff announced the signing of Toni Silić on loan from Hajduk Split.

Following Sheriff's 6–0 defeat to Slavia Prague in the UEFA Europa League, Roberto Bordin was fired as the club's head coach, with Viktor Mikhailov being put in temporary charge.

On 11 October, Roman Pylypchuk was announced as the new permanent head coach of Sheriff.

On 10 January, Sheriff announced the departure of Maksym Koval and Henrique Luvannor.

On 15 January, Sheriff announced the signing of Mario García from Progreso.

On 19 January, Sheriff announced the signings of Rodrigo Freitas, Tyler Reid, Ramon Vinicius, Maicol Ferreira and Thierry Nevers.

On 22 January, Sheriff announced the signing of Mateo Ortíz.

On 25 January, Sheriff announced the signing of Bernardo Vilar from IFK Värnamo.

On 31 January, David Ankeye left Sheriff to sign for Genoa.

On 1 February, Sheriff announced the signing of Wilinton Aponzá from Portimonense, whilst Munashe Garananga left the club to sign for KV Mechelen.

On 2 February, Sheriff announced the return of Mihail Ghecev from Mynai.

On 20 February, Amine Talal left Sheriff to sign for Akhmat Grozny.

On 5 March, Sheriff announced the signing of Anas Ouahim from Heracles Almelo.

On 19 March, Roman Pylypchuk left his role as head coach of Sheriff, with Victor Mihailov once again being put in temporary charge. On 7 May, Yuriy Hura was announced as the new permanent head coach of Sheriff.

== Squad ==
As of match played 18 May 2024

No.	Name	Nationality	Position	Date of birth (age)	Signed from	Signed in	Contract ends	Apps.	Goals
Goalkeepers
1	Victor Străistari	(Moldova)	GK	21 June 1999 (aged 24)	Sfîntul Gheorghe	2023		2	0
13	Toni Silić	(Croatia)	GK	7 May 2004 (aged 20)	on loan from Hajduk Split	2023		12	0
33	Serghei Pașcenco	(Moldova)	GK	18 December 1982 (aged 41)	Zaria Bălți	2018		127+	0
34	Dumitru Celeadnic	(Moldova)	GK	23 April 1992 (aged 32)	Politehnica Iași	2023		68	0
Defenders
2	Adamou Djibo	(Niger)	DF	13 August 1998 (aged 25)	ASN Nigelec	2023		5	0
3	Didier Bueno	(Colombia)	DF	21 June 1999 (aged 24)	on loan from Independiente Medellín	2023		17	1
4	Bernardo Vilar	(Brazil)	DF	12 February 1998 (aged 26)	on loan from IFK Värnamo	2024		10	2
16	Konstantinos Apostolakis	(Greece)	DF	28 May 1999 (aged 24)	Panetolikos	2023		27	0
20	Armel Zohouri	(Ivory Coast)	DF	5 April 2001 (aged 23)	Lausanne-Sport	2022		55	2
21	Cedric Ngah	(Cameroon)	DF	17 October 1998 (aged 25)	Sfîntul Gheorghe	2023		6	0
22	Tyler Reid	(England)	DF	24 January 2004 (aged 20)	VPS	2024		8	0
23	Cristian Tovar	(Colombia)	DF	21 June 1999 (aged 24)	Deportivo Pasto	2023		35	3
26	Artiom Dijinari	(Moldova)	DF	26 October 2005 (aged 18)	Academy	2022		1	0
28	Alejandro Artunduaga	(Colombia)	DF	9 September 1997 (aged 26)	Once Caldas	2023		32	1
29	Roman Novicov	(Moldova)	DF	24 January 2004 (aged 20)	Academy	2023		1	0
32	Rodrigo Freitas	(Brazil)	DF	17 June 1998 (aged 25)	Chapecoense	2024		10	0
Midfielders
6	Mario García	(Uruguay)	MF	8 September 1999 (aged 24)	on loan from Progreso	2024		4	0
8	João Paulo Fernandes	(Cape Verde)	MF	26 May 1998 (aged 25)	Feirense	2023		36	6
10	Cedric Badolo	(Burkina Faso)	MF	4 November 1998 (aged 25)	Pohronie	2023		87	16
12	Abdoul Moumouni	(Niger)	MF	7 August 2002 (aged 21)	US GN	2021		30	1
17	Jerome Ngom Mbekeli	(Cameroon)	MF	30 September 1998 (aged 25)	Beveren	2023		32	6
18	Moussa Kyabou	(Mali)	MF	18 April 1998 (aged 26)	USC Kita	2021		73	0
24	Danila Forov	(Moldova)	MF	7 January 2004 (aged 20)	HNK Rijeka	2023		6	2
27	Mateo Ortíz	(Ecuador)	MF	31 January 2000 (aged 24)	on loan from Independiente del Valle	2024		6	0
30	Anas Ouahim	(Morocco)	MF	23 September 1997 (aged 26)	on loan from Heracles Almelo	2024		7	0
36	Nichita Sandetchi	(Moldova)	MF	14 May 2005 (aged 19)	Academy	2023		1	0
43	Ramon Vinicius	(Brazil)	MF	24 January 2004 (aged 20)	Água Santa	2024		7	0
55	Maicol Ferreira	(Uruguay)	MF	24 January 2004 (aged 20)	Fénix	2024		7	1
69	Peter Ademo	(Nigeria)	MF	11 January 2003 (aged 21)	on loan from DFK Dainava	2023		16	2
77	Mihail Ghecev	(Moldova)	MF	5 November 1997 (aged 26)	Mynai	2024		24	6
Forwards
7	Abou Ouattara	(Burkina Faso)	FW	25 December 1999 (aged 24)	Valenciennes	2022		20	2
9	Thierry Nevers	(England)	FW	24 January 2004 (aged 20)	West Ham United	2024		10	1
11	Ricardinho	(Brazil)	FW	4 September 1989 (aged 34)	Unattached	2023		177	62
19	Wilinton Aponzá	(Colombia)	FW	29 March 2000 (aged 24)	Portimonense	2024		7	1
31	Dan-Angelo Botan	(Moldova)	FW	19 February 2005 (aged 19)	Academy	2023		6	0
42	Konan Jaures-Ulrich Loukou	(Ivory Coast)	FW	15 June 2005 (aged 18)	Issia Wazy	2023		11	0
61	Rasheed Akanbi	(Nigeria)	FW	9 May 1999 (aged 25)	Kocaelispor	2022		51	17
Out on loan
32	Roman Novicov	(Moldova)	MF	23 April 2003 (aged 21)	Academy	2023		1	0
	Danila Ignatov	(Moldova)	DF	19 June 2001 (aged 22)	Academy	2020		4	1
Left during the season
4	Munashe Garananga	(Zimbabwe)	DF	18 January 2001 (aged 23)	Dynamo Brest	2023		38	2
6	Stjepan Radeljić	(Bosnia and Herzegovina)	DF	5 September 1997 (aged 26)	Osijek	2022		84	3
14	Amine Talal	(Morocco)	MF	5 June 1996 (aged 27)	Bastia	2023		40	12
15	Gaby Kiki	(Cameroon)	DF	15 February 1995 (aged 29)	Rukh Brest	2022		64	4
22	Berkay Vardar	(Turkey)	MF	14 January 2003 (aged 21)	on loan from Beşiktaş	2023	2024	10	0
27	Vinícius Paiva	(Brazil)	FW	1 March 2001 (aged 23)	on loan from Vasco da Gama	2023		10	1
30	David Ankeye	(Nigeria)	FW	22 May 2002 (aged 21)	ES Hammam Sousse	2024		26	8
35	Maksym Koval	(Ukraine)	GK	9 December 1992 (aged 31)	Al Fateh	2022		41	0
40	Razak Abalora	(Ghana)	GK	4 September 1996 (aged 27)	Asante Kotoko	2022		24	0
80	Iyayi Atiemwen	(Nigeria)	FW	24 January 1996 (aged 28)	Dinamo Zagreb	2022		26	4
90	Henrique Luvannor	(Moldova)	FW	19 May 1990 (aged 33)	Ceará	2023		141	63
99	Momo Yansané	(Guinea)	FW	29 July 1997 (aged 26)	Nizhny Novgorod	2021		41	16
	Valeriu Gaiu	(Moldova)	DF	6 February 2001 (aged 23)	Academy	2020		19	0
	Christ Bekale	(Gabon)	MF	20 March 1999 (aged 25)	O Sidi Bouzid	2023		9	0
	Nichita Covali	(Moldova)	MF	7 September 2002 (aged 21)	Academy	2022		6	0
	Adrian Hatman	(Moldova)	MF	5 January 2003 (aged 21)	Real Succes Chișinău	2021		2	1
	Eugeniu Gliga	(Moldova)	MF	12 May 2001 (aged 23)	Academy	2020		13	0
	Bubacarr Tambedou	(The Gambia)	FW	5 April 2002 (aged 22)	Paide Linnameeskond	2023		11	1
	Danil Ankudinov	(Kazakhstan)	FW	31 July 2003 (aged 20)	Rodina Moscow	2022		9	1

== Transfers ==
=== In ===
Date	Position	Nationality	Name	From	Fee	Ref.
12 June 2023	DF	(Niger)	Adamou Djibo	ASN Nigelec	Undisclosed	
26 June 2023	GK	(Moldova)	Victor Străistari	Sfîntul Gheorghe	Undisclosed	
26 June 2023	DF	(Greece)	Konstantinos Apostolakis	Panetolikos	Undisclosed	
26 June 2023	MF	(Cape Verde)	João Paulo Fernandes	Feirense	Undisclosed	
27 June 2023	DF	(Colombia)	Cristian Tovar	Deportivo Pasto	Undisclosed	
3 July 2023	FW	(Moldova)	Henrique Luvannor	Ceará	Undisclosed	
5 July 2023	MF	(Cameroon)	Jerome Ngom Mbekeli	Beveren	Undisclosed	
5 July 2023	MF	(Moldova)	Danila Forov	HNK Rijeka	Undisclosed	
6 July 2023	DF	(Cameroon)	Cedric Ngah	Sfîntul Gheorghe	Undisclosed	
19 July 2023	DF	(Colombia)	Alejandro Artunduaga	Once Caldas	Undisclosed	
4 September 2023	GK	(Moldova)	Dumitru Celeadnic	Unattached	Free	
6 September 2023	FW	(Ivory Coast)	Konan Jaures-Ulrich Loukou	Issia Wazy	Undisclosed	
1 January 2024	FW	(Nigeria)	David Ankeye	ES Hammam Sousse	Undisclosed	
19 January 2024	DF	(Brazil)	Rodrigo Freitas	Chapecoense	Undisclosed	
19 January 2024	DF	(England)	Tyler Reid	VPS	Undisclosed	
19 January 2024	MF	(Brazil)	Ramon Vinicius	Água Santa	Undisclosed	
19 January 2024	MF	(Uruguay)	Maicol Ferreira	Fénix	Undisclosed	
19 January 2024	FW	(England)	Thierry Nevers	West Ham United	Undisclosed	
1 February 2024	FW	(Colombia)	Wilinton Aponzá	Portimonense	Undisclosed	
2 February 2024	MF	(Moldova)	Mihail Ghecev	Mynai	Undisclosed	

=== Loans in ===
Date from	Position	Nationality	Name	From	Date to	Ref.
11 February 2022	FW	(The Gambia)	Bubacarr Tambedou	Paide Linnameeskond	31 July 2023	
15 June 2023	DF	(Colombia)	Didier Bueno	Independiente Medellín	Undisclosed	
26 June 2023	MF	(Nigeria)	Peter Ademo	DFK Dainava	Undisclosed	
26 June 2023	FW	(Cape Verde)	Vinícius Paiva	Vasco da Gama	6 February 2024	
6 July 2023	FW	(Nigeria)	David Ankeye	ES Hammam Sousse	31 December 2023	
11 August 2023	MF	(Turkey)	Berkay Vardar	Beşiktaş	4 February 2024	
30 August 2023	GK	(Croatia)	Toni Silić	Hajduk Split	Undisclosed	
15 January 2024	MF	(Uruguay)	Mario García	Progreso	Undisclosed	
22 January 2024	MF	(Ecuador)	Mateo Ortíz	Independiente del Valle	Undisclosed	
25 January 2024	DF	(Brazil)	Bernardo Vilar	IFK Värnamo	Undisclosed	
5 March 2024	MF	(Morocco)	Anas Ouahim	Heracles Almelo	Undisclosed	

=== Out ===
Date	Position	Nationality	Name	To	Fee	Ref.
20 June 2023	DF	(Greece)	Stefanos Evangelou	NK Osijek	Undisclosed	
26 June 2023	DF	(Brazil)	Renan Guedes	NK Osijek	Undisclosed	
13 July 2023	DF	(Bosnia and Herzegovina)	Stjepan Radeljić	HNK Rijeka	Undisclosed	
26 August 2023	FW	(Nigeria)	Iyayi Atiemwen	Gostivari	Undisclosed	
17 January 2024	MF	(Moldova)	Eugeniu Gliga	Germania Leer	Undisclosed	
19 January 2024	GK	(Ghana)	Razak Abalora	Petrocub Hîncești	Undisclosed	
23 January 2024	DF	(Cameroon)	Gaby Kiki	Aktobe	Undisclosed	
27 January 2024	FW	(Kazakhstan)	Danil Ankudinov	Dnepr Mogilev	Undisclosed	
31 January 2024	MF	(Moldova)	Adrian Hatman	TSV Aubstadt	Undisclosed	
31 January 2024	FW	(Nigeria)	David Ankeye	Genoa	Undisclosed	
1 February 2024	DF	(Zimbabwe)	Munashe Garananga	KV Mechelen	Undisclosed	
20 February 2024	MF	(Morocco)	Amine Talal	Akhmat Grozny	Undisclosed	
28 February 2024	MF	(Moldova)	Nichita Covali	Zimbru Chișinău	Undisclosed	
30 March 2024	DF	(Moldova)	Valeriu Gaiu	Germania Leer	Undisclosed	

=== Loans out ===
Date from	Position	Nationality	Name	To	Date to	Ref.
31 January 2023	FW	(Moldova)	Valeriu Gaiu	Zimbru Chișinău	31 December 2023	
1 July 2023	MF	(Moldova)	Nichita Covali	Florești	31 December 2023	
29 July 2023	FW	(Kazakhstan)	Danil Ankudinov	Džiugas Telšiai	31 December 2023	
28 February 2024	MF	(Moldova)	Roman Novicov	Florești	31 December 2024	

=== Released ===
Date	Position	Nationality	Name	Joined	Date	Ref.
12 June 2023	GK	(Moldova)	Dumitru Celeadnic	Politehnica Iași		
12 June 2023	FW	(Argentina)	Michael López	Honka		
30 June 2023	MF	(Ghana)	Patrick Kpozo	Baník Ostrava		
30 June 2023	MF	(Moldova)	Serafim Cojocari	Unirea Slobozia		
31 July 2023	MF	(Gabon)	Christ Bekale	Future FC	19 August 2023	
9 September 2023	FW	(Guinea)	Momo Yansané	HNK Rijeka	9 September 2023	
10 January 2024	GK	(Ukraine)	Maksym Koval	Aris Thessaloniki	13 January 2024	
10 January 2024	FW	(Moldova)	Henrique Luvannor	Al-Bukiryah		

== Friendlies ==
25 June 2023	Sheriff Tiraspol	1–0	Zimbru Chișinău	Tiraspol
EEST (UTC+3)	Talal	Report		Stadium: Sheriff Stadium

30 June 2023	Sheriff Tiraspol	3–1	Petrocub Hîncești	Tiraspol
EEST (UTC+3)	Fernandes; Talal (pen.); Badolo	Report	Goal	Stadium: Sheriff Stadium

4 July 2023	Sheriff Tiraspol	2–0	Milsami Orhei	Tiraspol
EEST (UTC+3)	Talal 36'	Report		Stadium: Sheriff Stadium

4 February 2024	Sheriff Tiraspol	1–0	Bălți	Tiraspol
EET (UTC+2)	Akanbi	Report

10 February 2024	Sheriff Tiraspol	0–0	Zhenis	Belek, Turkey
EET (UTC+2)		Report

14 February 2024	Sheriff Tiraspol	v	Liepāja	Belek, Turkey
EET (UTC+2)		Report

17 February 2024	Sheriff Tiraspol	0–2	Dynamo Kyiv	Belek, Turkey
15:00 EET (UTC+2)		Report	Buyalskyi 58'; Voloshyn 80'

20 February 2024	Sheriff Tiraspol	1–1	Valmiera	Belek, Turkey
16:00 EET (UTC+2)	Ricardinho 19'	Report	Guèye 46' (pen.)

22 February 2024	Sheriff Tiraspol	1–2	RFS	Belek, Turkey
16:00 EET (UTC+2)	Vilar	Report	Goal

== Competitions ==
=== Overall record ===
Competition	First match	Last match	Starting round	Final position	Record							
Competition	First match	Last match	Starting round	Final position	Pld	W	D	L	GF	GA	GD	Win %
National Division	6 August 2023	18 May 2024	Matchday 1	2nd	24	16	4	4	51	16	+35	66.67
Moldovan Cup	1 November 2023	1 May 2024	Round of 16	Semifinal	5	3	1	1	11	3	+8	60.00
UEFA Champions League	12 July 2023	2 August 2023	First qualifying round	Second qualifying round	4	2	0	2	5	5	+0	50.00
UEFA Europa League	10 August 2022	14 December 2023	Third qualifying round	Group Stage	10	2	3	5	15	22	−7	20.00
Total					43	23	8	12	82	46	+36	53.49

Last updated: 18 May 2024
Source: Competitions

=== Super Liga ===
==== Phase I ====
===== League table =====
Pos	Team	Pld	W	D	L	GF	GA	GD	Pts	Qualification or relegation
1	Sheriff Tiraspol	14	11	1	2	35	7	+28	34	Qualification to Phase II
2	Petrocub Hîncești	14	8	4	2	29	7	+22	28 (Note: Head-to-head points: Petrocub : 4, Milsami : 1.)	Qualification to Phase II
3	Milsami Orhei	14	9	1	4	20	14	+6	28	Qualification to Phase II
4	Zimbru Chișinău	14	8	1	5	17	11	+6	25	Qualification to Phase II
5	Bălți	14	7	1	6	26	22	+4	22	Qualification to Phase II

Source: FMF, UEFA, Soccerway
Rules for classification: 1) Points; 2) Head-to-head points; 3) Head-to-head goal difference; 4) Head-to-head goals scored; 5) Matches won; 6) Goal difference; 7) Goals scored; 8) Least red cards; 9) Least yellow cards.

===== Results summary =====
Overall								Home						Away					
Pld	W	D	L	GF	GA	GD	Pts	W	D	L	GF	GA	GD	W	D	L	GF	GA	GD
14	11	1	2	35	7	+28	34	6	1	0	22	2	+20	5	0	2	13	5	+8

Last updated: 3 December 2023.
Source: FMF

===== Results =====
6 August 2023 1	Petrocub Hîncești	0–1	Sheriff Tiraspol	Hîncești
20:00 EEST (UTC+3)	Jardan (yellow card) 51'; Cojocaru (yellow card) 58'	Report	Luvannor 73'; Koval (yellow card) 90+7'	Stadium: Stadionul Municipal; Attendance: 1,269; Referee: Ion Orlic

13 August 2023 2	Spartanii Selemet	0–2	Sheriff Tiraspol	Suruceni
18:00 EEST (UTC+3)		Report	Talal 45+3' (penalty missed) 75'; Paiva 69'	Stadium: Suruceni Stadium; Attendance: 300; Referee: Ion Bîlea

20 August 2023 3	Sheriff Tiraspol	5–0	Dacia Buiucani	Tiraspol
20:00 EEST (UTC+3)	Yansané 10'; Ankeye 26'; Talal 39'; Tovar 43'; Luvannor 90+3'	Report	Bivol (yellow card) 63'	Stadium: Sheriff Arena; Attendance: 1,100; Referee: Ivan Tudos

27 August 2023 4	Milsami Orhei	2–0	Sheriff Tiraspol	Orhei
20:00 EEST (UTC+3)	Lambarschi 36'; Graur (yellow card) 78'; Lisu (yellow card) 86'; Puntus 90+1'; Gînsari (yellow card) FT	Report	Ademo (yellow card) 20'; Talal (yellow card) 31'; Ngah (yellow card) 90+3'	Stadium: CSR Orhei; Attendance: 1,750; Referee: Igor Boșca

16 September 2023 5	Sheriff Tiraspol	5–1	Florești	Tiraspol
17:00 EEST (UTC+3)	Talal 21' (pen.); Ademo 28'; Artunduaga 37'; Luvannor 45+1'; Mbekeli 55'; Botan (yellow card) 80'; Kiki (yellow card) 88'	Report	Ursu (yellow card) 20'; Muntean (yellow card) 25'; Holodov 62'; Voropai (yellow card) 72'	Stadium: Sheriff Arena; Attendance: 738; Referee: Viktor Bugenko

24 September 2023 6	Zimbru Chișinău	0–1	Sheriff Tiraspol	Chișinău
19:00 EEST (UTC+3)		Report	Fernandes 20'; Talal (yellow card) 69'; Ankeye (yellow card) 82'; Moumouni (yellow card) 90+5'; Zohouri (yellow card) 90+9'	Stadium: Zimbru Stadium; Attendance: 7,800; Referee: Daniel Luca

30 September 2023 7	Sheriff Tiraspol	4–0	Bălți	Tiraspol
20:00 EEST (UTC+3)	Talal 24', 28'; Apostolakis (yellow card) 32'; Luvannor 41'; Moumouni (yellow card) 78'; Garananga (yellow card) 82'; Ricardinho 88'	Report	BelyÁlvaro Bely (yellow card) 30'; Yakovlev (yellow card) 57'; L.Nsue (yellow card) 87'	Stadium: Sheriff Arena; Attendance: 670; Referee: Andrei Ceban

8 October 2023 8	Sheriff Tiraspol	0–0	Petrocub Hîncești	Tiraspol
18:00 EEST (UTC+3)	Zohouri (yellow card) 73'	Report	Cotogoi (yellow card) 60'; Potîrniche (yellow card) 69'	Stadium: Sheriff Arena; Attendance: 450; Referee: Ion Orlic

21 October 2023 9	Sheriff Tiraspol	4–0	Spartanii Sportul	Tiraspol
15:00 EEST (UTC+3)	Bueno 19'; Ankeye 41', 63'; Talal 77'	Report	Andronic (yellow card) 71'	Stadium: Sheriff Arena; Attendance: 503; Referee: Ion Bîlea

29 October 2023 10	Dacia Buiucani	0–4	Sheriff Tiraspol	Chișinău
14:00 EET (UTC+2)	Rebeja (yellow card) 34'; Josan (yellow card) 66'	Report	Luvannor 11'; Ankeye (yellow card) 18'; Mbekeli (yellow card) 72' (goal) 90'; Fernandes 79'; Ricardinho 86'; Garananga (yellow card) 90+2'	Stadium: Zimbru-2 Stadium; Attendance: 453; Referee: Andre Ceban

5 November 2023 11	Sheriff Tiraspol	2–1	Milsami Orhei	Tiraspol
17:00 EET (UTC+2)	Mbekeli (yellow card) 25' (goal) 48'; Ankeye 32'; Bueno (yellow card) 71'; Zohouri (yellow card) 74'	Report	Bolohan (yellow card) 31'; Lisu (yellow card) 39'; Cioban (yellow card) 41'; Camara 90+3'; Samiev (yellow card) FT	Stadium: Sheriff Arena; Attendance: 800; Referee: Daniel Luca

12 November 2023 12	Florești	0–4	Sheriff Tiraspol	Bender
13:00 EET (UTC+2)	Osipov (yellow card) 83'; Chiperi (yellow card) 90+3'	Report	Ankeye 45'; Ricardinho 47'; Moumouni 87'; Talal 90+4'	Stadium: Stadionul Dinamo; Attendance: 200; Referee: Ghenadie Sidenco

25 November 2023 13	Sheriff Tiraspol	2–0	Zimbru Chișinău	Tiraspol
14:00 EET (UTC+2)	Luvannor 8'; Talal 34' (yellow card) 89'; Mbekeli (yellow card) 81'	Report	Soumah (yellow card) 19' (yellow-red card) 47'	Stadium: Sheriff Arena; Attendance: 516; Referee: Roman Jitari

3 December 2023 14	Bălți	3–1	Sheriff Tiraspol	Bălți
13:00 EET (UTC+2)	Neagu 43'; Mbourou (yellow card) 65'; Andrézinho 75'; Păscăluță 80'	Report	Luvannor 65'	Stadium: Stadionul Orășenesc; Attendance: 1,946; Referee: Ghenadie Sidenco

==== Phase II ====
===== League table =====
Pos	Team	Pld	W	D	L	GF	GA	GD	Pts	Qualification
1	Petrocub Hîncești (C)	10	7	3	0	30	5	+25	24	Qualification for the Champions League first qualifying round
2	Sheriff Tiraspol	10	5	3	2	16	9	+7	18	Qualification for the Europa League first qualifying round
3	Zimbru Chișinău	10	5	2	3	16	12	+4	17	Qualification for the Conference League second qualifying round
4	Milsami Orhei	10	2	4	4	11	12	−1	10	Qualification for the Conference League first qualifying round
5	Bălți	10	2	2	6	7	22	−15	8	

Source: FMF, UEFA, Soccerway
Rules for classification: 1) Points; 2) Play-off (only if deciding champion when two teams tied); 3) Head-to-head points; 4) Head-to-head goal difference; 5) Head-to-head goals scored; 6) Matches won; 7) Goal difference; 8) Goals scored; 9) Least red cards; 10) Least yellow cards.
(C) Champions

===== Results summary =====
Overall								Home						Away					
Pld	W	D	L	GF	GA	GD	Pts	W	D	L	GF	GA	GD	W	D	L	GF	GA	GD
10	5	3	2	16	9	+7	18	5	2	0	15	5	+10	0	1	2	1	4	−3

Last updated: 18 May 2024.
Source: FMF

===== Results =====
9 March 2024 15	Sheriff Tiraspol	1–1	Dacia Buiucani	Tiraspol
14:00 EET (UTC+2)	Vilar 68'	Report	Bivol (yellow card) 37'; Zasavițchi 45+1'; Dumbrava (yellow card) 55'; Lupascu (yellow card) 83'; Dodon (yellow card) 90+2'	Stadium: Sheriff Arena; Attendance: 607; Referee: Roman Jitari

16 March 2024 16	Sheriff Tiraspol	1–1	Petrocub Hîncești	Tiraspol
16:00 EET (UTC+2)	Badolo 11'	Report	Jardan 38'; Platica (yellow card) 45+3'; Mudrac (yellow card) 67'; Lupan (yellow card) 76'	Stadium: Sheriff Arena; Attendance: 896; Referee: Piotr Stoianov

31 March 2024 17	Milsami Orhei	0–0	Sheriff Tiraspol	Orhei
16:00 EEST (UTC+3)	Tîmbur (yellow card) 35'; Gînsari (yellow card) 35'; Bolohan (yellow card) 35'; Cioban (red card) 38'; Dijinari (yellow card) 73'; Lambarschi (yellow card) 75'; Milić (yellow card) 89'; Camara (yellow card) 90+1'	Report	Nevers (yellow card) 25'; Mbekeli (yellow card) 78'; Kyabou (yellow card) 83'; Ghecev (yellow card) 89'; Fernandes (yellow card) 90+1'	Stadium: CSR Orhei; Attendance: 2,250; Referee: Daniel Luca

7 April 2024 18	Sheriff Tiraspol	4–1	Zimbru Chișinău	Tiraspol
18:00 EEST (UTC+3)	Fernandes 15', 45'; Aponzá 37'; Badolo 46'; Ghecev (yellow card) 53'; Ortíz (yellow card) 75'	Report	Paulino 29'; Djou (yellow card) 49'; Soumah (yellow card) 79'	Stadium: Sheriff Arena; Attendance: 1,321; Referee: Denis Ivlev

13 April 2024 19	Sheriff Tiraspol	2–0	Bălți	Tiraspol
18:00 EEST (UTC+3)	Vilar 14'; Badolo 77' (pen.)	Report	Andrézinho (yellow card) 72'	Stadium: Sheriff Arena; Attendance: 911; Referee: Andrei Breguța

21 April 2024 20	Sheriff Tiraspol	3–0	Dacia Buiucani	Tiraspol
15:00 EEST (UTC+3)	Akanbi 46'; Aponzá (yellow card) 55'; Ouahim (yellow card) 61'; Ricardinho 71'; Badolo 76'	Report	Botnari (yellow card) 28'; Bivol (yellow card) 51'; Efros (red card) 55'	Stadium: Sheriff Arena; Attendance: 376; Referee: Andrei Ceban

28 April 2024 21	Petrocub Hîncești	2–1	Sheriff Tiraspol	Hîncești
18:00 EEST (UTC+3)	Plătică 4'; Abagna 61'; Pușcaș (yellow card) 76'; Lungu (yellow card) 80'; Jardan (yellow card) 90+5'; Potîrniche (yellow card) 90+7'; Ambros (yellow card) FT	Report	Ferreira (yellow card) 34'; Badolo (yellow card) 53'; Ortíz (yellow card) 55'; Aponzá (yellow card) 73'; Akanbi 89'	Stadium: Stadionul Municipal; Attendance: 1,300; Referee: Daniel Luca

4 May 2024 22	Sheriff Tiraspol	2–1	Milsami Orhei	Tiraspol
18:00 EEST (UTC+3)	Rodrigo (yellow card) 33'; Akanbi 35'; Badolo 60'	Report	Camara 63'	Stadium: Sheriff Arena; Attendance: 759; Referee: Andrei Cojocaru

11 May 2024 23	Zimbru Chișinău	2–0	Sheriff Tiraspol	Chișinău
20:00 EEST (UTC+3)	Alaribe 41'; Dedechko (yellow card) 62'; Ohajunwa 76'	Report		Stadium: Zimbru Stadium; Attendance: 1,717; Referee: Igor Boșca

18 May 2024 24	Sheriff Tiraspol	2–1	Bălți	Tiraspol
20:00 EEST (UTC+3)	Badolo 22', 59'; Bueno (yellow card) 82'	Report	Danu 50'; Agbodize (yellow card) 58'; Dedov (yellow card) 82'	Stadium: Sheriff Arena; Attendance: 437; Referee: Andrei Breguța

=== Moldovan Cup ===
1 November 2023 Round of 16	Sheriff Tiraspol	5–0	FCM Ungheni	Tiraspol
18:00 EET (UTC+2)	Fernandes 17'; Garananga (yellow card) 33' (goal) 45', 73'; Sandetchi (yellow card) 37'; Luvannor 40'; Forov 89'	Report	Vatavu (yellow card) 58'	Stadium: Malaya Sportivnaya Arena; Attendance: 200; Referee: Denis Ivlev

3 March 2024 Quarterfinal 1st leg	Sheriff Tiraspol	2–0	Victoria Chișinău	Tiraspol
14:00 EET (UTC+2)	Ghecev 42'; Nevers 84'	Report	Daniliuc (yellow card) 31'	Stadium: Malaya Sportivnaya Arena; Attendance: 750; Referee: Andrei Ceban

3 April 2024 Quarterfinal 2nd leg	Victoria Chișinău	1–3 (1–5 agg.)	Sheriff Tiraspol	Chișinău
14:00 EEST (UTC+3)	Postoroncă (yellow card) 18'; Gurgurov (yellow card) 40'; Namalovan 54'; Guştiuc (yellow card) 40'	Report	Ferreira 5'; Forov 22'; Akanbi 80'	Stadium: Joma Arena; Attendance: 250; Referee: Ivan Tudos

24 April 2024 Semifinal 1st leg	Zimbru Chișinău	1–0	Sheriff Tiraspol	Chișinău
19:00 EET (UTC+2)	Soumah (yellow card) 45+2'; Djou 60'; Misarăș (yellow card) 73'; Furtună (yellow card) 81'; Cebotari (yellow card) 90+5'; Dedechko (yellow card) 90+6'	Report	Ortíz (yellow card) 85'	Stadium: Zimbru Stadium; Attendance: 1,200; Referee: Daniel Luca

1 May 2024 Semifinal 2nd leg	Sheriff Tiraspol	1–1 (1–2 agg.)	Zimbru Chișinău	Tiraspol
19:00 EEST (UTC+3)	Ricardinho (yellow card) 2'; Fernandes 32' (yellow card) 60'; Apostolakis (yellow card) 90+1'	Report	Alaribe 25'; Macrițchii (yellow card) 66'; Sandu (yellow card) 81'	Stadium: Malaya Sportivnaya Arena; Attendance: 1,300; Referee: Piotr Stoianov

=== UEFA Champions League ===
==== Qualifying rounds ====
12 July 2023 First qualifying round 1st leg	Farul Constanța (Romania)	1–0	(Moldova) Sheriff Tiraspol	Ovidiu, Romania
20:30 EEST (UTC+3)	Kiki (yellow card) 10' (goal) 56'; Mazilu (yellow card) 33'; Băluță (yellow card) 53'	Report	Kyabou (yellow card) 49'; Talal (yellow card) 52'; Bueno (yellow card) 55'	Stadium: Stadionul Viitorul; Attendance: 4,028; Referee: Sander Van Der Eijk (Netherlands)

18 July 2023 First qualifying round 2nd leg	Sheriff Tiraspol (Moldova)	3–0 (3–1 agg.)	(Romania) Farul Constanța	Tiraspol, Moldova
20:00 EEST (UTC+3)	Talal 45+1'; Mbekeli (yellow card) 95' (goal) 99'; Bueno (yellow card) 101'; Ademo 105+1'	Report	Boli (yellow card) 43'; Alibec (yellow card) 101'	Stadium: Sheriff Arena; Attendance: 5,792; Referee: Miguel Nogueira (Portugal)

26 July 2023 Second qualifying round 1st leg	Sheriff Tiraspol (Moldova)	1–0	(Israel) Maccabi Haifa	Tiraspol, Moldova
20:00 EEST (UTC+3)	Talal 28'; Mbekeli (yellow card) 51'; Apostolakis (yellow card) 86'	Report	Cornud (yellow card) 70'; Sundgren (yellow card) 90+2'; Pierrot (yellow card) 90+5'	Stadium: Sheriff Arena; Attendance: 7,933; Referee: Sebastian Gishamer (Austria)

2 August 2023 Second qualifying round 2nd leg	Maccabi Haifa (Israel)	4–1 (a.e.t.) (4–2 agg.)	(Moldova) Sheriff Tiraspol	Haifa, Israel
20:00 EEST (UTC+3)	Mohamed (yellow card) 18'; Haziza (yellow card) 18'; Chery 33'; Saba (yellow card) 56'; Jaber 85'; Kandil (yellow card) 86'; David 105+2'; Shuranov 107' (yellow card) 119'; Podgoreanu (yellow card) 113'	Report	Talal 20' (pen.) (yellow card) 45+10' (red card) 90+4'; Koval (yellow card) 31'; Luvannor (yellow card) 42' (yellow-red card) 86'; Mbekeli (yellow card) 45+1'; Zohouri (yellow card) 119'	Stadium: Sammy Ofer Stadium; Attendance: 29,000; Referee: Damian Sylwestrzak (Poland)

=== UEFA Europa League ===
==== Qualifying rounds ====
10 August 2023 Third qualifying round 1st leg	Sheriff Tiraspol (Moldova)	5–1	(Belarus) BATE Borisov	Tiraspol, Moldova
20:00 EEST (UTC+3)	Ankeye 12', 47'; Badolo 32'; Apostolakis (yellow card) 73'; Yansané 90+3', 90+8'	Report	Bane 50'	Stadium: Sheriff Arena; Attendance: 5,400; Referee: Mohammed Al-Hakim (Sweden)

17 August 2023 Third qualifying round 2nd leg	BATE Borisov (Belarus)	2–2 (3–7 agg.)	(Moldova) Sheriff Tiraspol	Mezőkövesd, Hungary
21:00 EEST (UTC+3)	Jimoh (yellow card) 14'; Kontsevoy 25' (yellow card) 68'; Shestyuk (yellow card) 41'; Khadarkevich (yellow card) 76'; Grechikho (yellow card) 87'; Laptev 90+4'	Report	Garananga (yellow card) 6'; Kiki (yellow card) 24'; Ricardinho 40' (pen.); Luvannor 45+2' (pen.)	Stadium: Mezőkövesdi Városi Stadion; Attendance: 0 Referee: António Nobre (Portugal)
Note: Match played behind closed doors at the Mezőkövesdi Városi Stadion in Mezőkövesd, Hungary, instead of BATE Borisov's regular Borisov Arena in Barysaw, Belarus due to Belarus's involvement in the Russian invasion of Ukraine.

24 August 2023 Playoff round 1st leg	KÍ (Faroe Islands)	1–1	(Moldova) Sheriff Tiraspol	Tórshavn, Faroe Islands
21:45 EEST (UTC+3)	Da Silva 52'	Report	Mbekeli 73'	Stadium: Tórsvøllur; Attendance: 3,413; Referee: Rade Obrenovič (Slovenia)
Note: KÍ played their home match at the Tórsvøllur, Tórshavn, instead of their regular stadium, Við Djúpumýrar, in Klaksvík, which did not meet UEFA requirements.

31 August 2023 Playoff round 2nd leg	Sheriff Tiraspol (Moldova)	2–1 (3–2 agg.)	(Faroe Islands) KÍ	Tiraspol, Moldova
20:00 EEST (UTC+3)	Luvannor 16' (pen.); Artunduaga (yellow card) 45+2'; Badolo (yellow card) 51'; Fernandes (yellow card) 68'; Zohouri 74'; Kiki (yellow card) 82'; Garananga (yellow card) 83'	Report	Joensen (yellow card) 14'; Kassi 34'; Færø (yellow card) 70'; H.Hansson (yellow card) 80'; J.Johannessen (yellow card) 90+3'	Stadium: Sheriff Arena; Attendance: 5,493; Referee: Halil Umut Meler (Turkey)

==== Group stage ====
Pos	Team	Pld	W	D	L	GF	GA	GD	Pts	Qualification
1	(Czech Republic) Slavia Prague	6	5	0	1	17	4	+13	15	Advance to round of 16
2	(Italy) Roma	6	4	1	1	12	4	+8	13	Advance to knockout round play-offs
3	(Switzerland) Servette	6	1	2	3	4	13	−9	5	Transfer to Europa Conference League
4	(Moldova) Sheriff Tiraspol	6	0	1	5	5	17	−12	1	

Source: UEFA
Rules for classification: Group stage tiebreakers

21 September 2023 1	Sheriff Tiraspol (Moldova)	1–2	(Italy) Roma	Tiraspol, Moldova
19:45 EEST (UTC+3)	Talal (yellow card) 45+3'; Tovar 57'; Kiki (yellow card) 77'; Apostolakis (yellow card) 90+2'; Fernandes (yellow card) 90+7' (red card) 90+8'	Report	Paredes 45+4'; Cristante (yellow card) 56'; Lukaku 65'	Stadium: Arena Sheriff; Referee: Andris Treimanis (Latvia)

5 October 2023 2	Slavia Prague (Czech Republic)	6–0	(Moldova) Sheriff Tiraspol	Prague, Czech Republic
22:00 EEST (UTC+3)	Chytil 4', 71'; Ogbu 7'; Garananga 39' (o.g.); Schranz 47'; Douděra 58'	Report	Tovar (yellow card) 35'; Kiki (yellow card) 44'; Mbekeli (yellow card) 68'	Stadium: Fortuna Arena; Attendance: 17,844; Referee: Willy Delajod (France)

26 October 2023 3	Sheriff Tiraspol (Moldova)	1–1	(Switzerland) Servette	Tiraspol, Moldova
22:00 EEST (UTC+3)	Tovar (yellow card) 50'; Zohouri (yellow card) 75'; Ankeye 80'	Report	Crivelli 41'	Stadium: Arena Sheriff; Attendance: 2,834; Referee: John Brooks (England)

9 November 2023 4	Servette (Switzerland)	2–1	(Moldova) Sheriff Tiraspol	Geneva, Switzerland
19:45 EET (UTC+2)	Severin (yellow card) 69'; Rouiller 84'; Bedia 90+3' (pen.) (yellow card) 90+5'	Report	Severin 12' (o.g.); Badolo (yellow card) 37'; Zohouri (yellow card) 79' (yellow-red card) 90'; Kiki (yellow card) 90' (yellow-red card) 90+8'; Koval (yellow card) 90+8'	Stadium: Stade de Genève; Attendance: 15,822; Referee: Manfredas Lukjančukas (Lithuania)

30 November 2023 5	Sheriff Tiraspol (Moldova)	2–3	(Czech Republic) Slavia Prague	Tiraspol, Moldova
22:00 EET (UTC+2)	Apostolakis (yellow card) 33'; Tovar 45+3'; Ngom Mbekeli 56'; Talal (yellow card) 67'; Badolo (yellow card) 83'; Artunduaga (yellow card) 90+4'	Report	Jurečka 19'; Dumitrescu (yellow card) 45+2'; Zafeiris 78'; Tijani (yellow card) 83' (goal) 90+5' (pen.)	Stadium: Arena Sheriff; Attendance: 1,520; Referee: Christian-Petru Ciochirca (Austria)

14 December 2023 6	Roma (Italy)	3–0	(Moldova) Sheriff Tiraspol	Rome, Italy
19:45 EET (UTC+2)	Lukaku 11'; Belotti 32'; Bove (yellow card) 77'; Pisilli 90+3'	Report	Talal (yellow card) 24'; Ricardinho (yellow card) 61'	Stadium: Stadio Olimpico; Attendance: 47,803; Referee: Jérôme Brisard (France)

== Squad statistics ==
As of match played 18 May 2024

=== Appearances and goals ===
No.	Pos	Nat	Player	Total		Super Liga		Moldovan Cup		Champions League		Europa League	
No.	Pos	Nat	Player	Apps	Goals	Apps	Goals	Apps	Goals	Apps	Goals	Apps	Goals
1	GK	(Moldova) MDA	Victor Străistari	2	0	1	0	1	0	0	0	0	0
2	DF	(Niger) NIG	Adamou Djibo	5	0	1+2	0	0	0	0+2	0	0	0
3	DF	(Colombia) COL	Didier Bueno	17	1	11+2	1	1	0	2	0	0+1	0
4	DF	(Brazil) BRA	Bernardo Vilar	10	2	6+1	2	3	0	0	0	0	0
6	MF	(Uruguay) URU	Mario García	4	0	0+2	0	1+1	0	0	0	0	0
8	MF	(Cape Verde) CPV	João Paulo Fernandes	36	6	16+4	4	3	2	4	0	9	0
9	FW	(England) ENG	Thierry Nevers	10	1	5+2	0	2+1	1	0	0	0	0
10	MF	(Burkina Faso) BFA	Cedric Badolo	35	8	18+1	7	3+1	0	1+2	0	8+1	1
11	FW	(Brazil) BRA	Ricardinho	38	5	15+7	4	3+1	0	0+2	0	7+3	1
12	MF	(Niger) NIG	Abdoul Moumouni	9	1	5+4	1	0	0	0	0	0	0
13	GK	(Croatia) CRO	Toni Silić	12	0	11+1	0	0	0	0	0	0	0
16	DF	(Greece) GRE	Konstantinos Apostolakis	27	0	7+4	0	3	0	4	0	4+5	0
17	MF	(Cameroon) CMR	Jerome Ngom Mbekeli	32	6	12+5	3	1+1	0	4	1	8+1	2
18	MF	(Mali) MLI	Moussa Kyabou	15	0	7	0	4	0	4	0	0	0
19	FW	(Colombia) COL	Wilinton Aponzá	7	1	6	1	0+1	0	0	0	0	0
20	DF	(Ivory Coast) CIV	Armel Zohouri	25	1	9+3	0	0	0	4	0	6+3	1
21	DF	(Cameroon) CMR	Cedric Ngah	6	0	2+1	0	0	0	0+3	0	0	0
22	DF	(England) ENG	Tyler Reid	8	0	3+4	0	1	0	0	0	0	0
23	DF	(Colombia) COL	Cristian Tovar	35	3	15+4	1	3	0	3+1	0	8+1	2
24	MF	(Moldova) MDA	Danila Forov	6	2	1+2	0	2+1	2	0	0	0	0
27	MF	(Ecuador) ECU	Mateo Ortíz	6	0	2+2	0	1+1	0	0	0	0	0
28	DF	(Colombia) COL	Alejandro Artunduaga	32	1	17+2	1	3	0	0	0	10	0
29	DF	(Moldova) MDA	Vlad Colis	1	0	0	0	0+1	0	0	0	0	0
30	MF	(Morocco) MAR	Anas Ouahim	7	0	4+1	0	1+1	0	0	0	0	0
31	FW	(Moldova) MDA	Dan-Angelo Botan	6	0	0+3	0	0+1	0	0	0	0+2	0
32	DF	(Brazil) BRA	Rodrigo Freitas	10	0	5+2	0	2+1	0	0	0	0	0
34	GK	(Moldova) MDA	Dumitru Celeadnic	7	0	3	0	4	0	0	0	0	0
36	MF	(Moldova) MDA	Nichita Sandetchi	1	0	0	0	1	0	0	0	0	0
42	FW	(Ivory Coast) CIV	Konan Jaures-Ulrich Loukou	11	0	0+9	0	1+1	0	0	0	0	0
43	MF	(Brazil) BRA	Ramon Vinicius	7	0	5+2	0	0	0	0	0	0	0
55	MF	(Uruguay) URU	Maicol Ferreira	7	1	1+3	0	2+1	1	0	0	0	0
61	FW	(Nigeria) NGR	Rasheed Akanbi	13	4	7+2	3	3+1	1	0	0	0	0
69	MF	(Nigeria) NGR	Peter Ademo	16	2	5+1	1	0	0	2+2	1	6	0
77	MF	(Moldova) MDA	Mihail Ghecev	14	1	8+2	0	3+1	1	0	0	0	0
Players away on loan:
32	MF	(Moldova) MDA	Roman Novicov	1	0	0	0	0+1	0	0	0	0	0
Players who left Sheriff Tiraspol during the season:
4	DF	(Zimbabwe) ZIM	Munashe Garananga	24	2	6+3	0	1	2	4	0	8+2	0
14	MF	(Morocco) MAR	Amine Talal	24	11	12+1	8	0+1	0	4	3	6	0
15	DF	(Cameroon) CMR	Gaby Kiki	14	0	5+1	0	0	0	0	0	8	0
22	MF	(Turkey) TUR	Berkay Vardar	10	0	4+2	0	1	0	0	0	0+3	0
27	FW	(Brazil) BRA	Vinícius Paiva	10	1	2+2	1	0	0	0+4	0	1+1	0
30	FW	(Nigeria) NGR	David Ankeye	25	8	5+8	5	0	0	0+2	0	6+4	3
35	GK	(Ukraine) UKR	Maksym Koval	22	0	8	0	0	0	4	0	10	0
40	GK	(Ghana) GHA	Razak Abalora	1	0	1	0	0	0	0	0	0	0
90	FW	(Moldova) MDA	Henrique Luvannor	25	10	11+1	7	1	1	4	0	5+3	2
99	FW	(Guinea) GUI	Momo Yansané	6	3	3	1	0	0	0	0	0+3	2

=== Goal scorers ===
Place	Position	Nation	Number	Name	Super Liga	Moldovan Cup	Champions League	Europa League	Total
1	MF	(Morocco)	14	Amine Talal	8	0	3	0	11
2	FW	(Moldova)	90	Henrique Luvannor	7	1	0	2	10
3	MF	(Burkina Faso)	10	Cedric Badolo	7	0	0	1	8
3	FW	(Nigeria)	30	David Ankeye	5	0	0	3	8
5	MF	(Cape Verde)	8	João Paulo Fernandes	4	2	0	0	6
5	MF	(Cameroon)	17	Jerome Ngom Mbekeli	3	0	1	2	6
7	FW	(Brazil)	11	Ricardinho	4	0	0	1	5
8	FW	(Nigeria)	61	Rasheed Akanbi	3	1	0	0	4
9	FW	(Guinea)	99	Momo Yansané	1	0	0	2	3
9	DF	(Colombia)	23	Cristian Tovar	1	0	0	2	3
11	DF	(Brazil)	4	Bernardo Vilar	2	0	0	0	2
11	MF	(Nigeria)	69	Peter Ademo	1	0	1	0	2
11	DF	(Zimbabwe)	4	Munashe Garananga	0	2	0	0	2
11	DF	(Moldova)	24	Danila Forov	0	2	0	0	2
15	FW	(Brazil)	27	Vinícius Paiva	1	0	0	0	1
15	DF	(Colombia)	29	Alejandro Artunduaga	1	0	0	0	1
15	DF	(Colombia)	3	Didier Bueno	1	0	0	0	1
15	MF	(Niger)	12	Abdoul Moumouni	1	0	0	0	1
15	FW	(Colombia)	19	Wilinton Aponzá	1	0	0	0	1
15	MF	(Niger)	77	Mihail Ghecev	0	1	0	0	1
15	FW	(England)	9	Thierry Nevers	0	1	0	0	1
15	MF	(Uruguay)	55	Maicol Ferreira	0	1	0	0	1
15	DF	(Ivory Coast)	20	Armel Zohouri	0	0	0	1	1
15				Own goal	0	0	0	1	1
				TOTALS	51	11	5	15	82

=== Clean sheets ===
Place	Position	Nation	Number	Name	Super Liga	Moldovan Cup	Champions League	Europa League	Total
1	GK	(Croatia)	13	Toni Silić	7	0	0	0	7
1	GK	(Ukraine)	35	Maksym Koval	5	0	2	0	7
3	GK	(Moldova)	1	Victor Străistari	1	1	0	0	2
4	GK	(Ghana)	40	Razak Abalora	1	0	0	0	1
4	GK	(Ghana)	34	Dumitru Celeadnic	0	1	0	0	1
				TOTALS	13	2	2	0	17

Maksym Koval & Toni Silić both played in Sheriff's 4–0 victory over Spartanii Sportul on 21 October 2023

=== Disciplinary record ===
Number	Nation	Position	Name	Super Liga		Moldovan Cup		Champions League		Europa League		Total	
Number	Nation	Position	Name	Booked	Sent off (straight red)	Booked	Sent off (straight red)	Booked	Sent off (straight red)	Booked	Sent off (straight red)	Booked	Sent off (straight red)
3	(Colombia)	DF	Didier Bueno	2	0	0	0	2	0	0	0	4	0
8	(Cape Verde)	MF	João Paulo Fernandes	1	0	1	0	0	0	2	1	4	1
9	(England)	FW	Thierry Nevers	1	0	0	0	0	0	0	0	1	0
10	(Burkina Faso)	MF	Cedric Badolo	1	0	0	0	0	0	3	0	4	0
11	(Brazil)	FW	Ricardinho	0	0	1	0	0	0	1	0	2	0
12	(Niger)	MF	Abdoul Moumouni	2	0	0	0	0	0	0	0	2	0
16	(Greece)	DF	Konstantinos Apostolakis	1	0	1	0	1	0	3	0	6	0
17	(Cameroon)	MF	Jerome Ngom Mbekeli	4	0	0	0	3	0	1	0	8	0
18	(Mali)	MF	Moussa Kyabou	1	0	0	0	1	0	0	0	2	0
19	(Colombia)	FW	Wilinton Aponzá	2	0	0	0	0	0	0	0	2	0
20	(Ivory Coast)	DF	Armel Zohouri	3	0	0	0	1	0	3	1	7	1
21	(Cameroon)	DF	Cedric Ngah	1	0	0	0	0	0	0	0	1	0
23	(Colombia)	DF	Cristian Tovar	0	0	0	0	0	0	2	0	2	0
27	(Ecuador)	MF	Mateo Ortíz	2	0	1	0	0	0	0	0	3	0
28	(Colombia)	DF	Alejandro Artunduaga	0	0	0	0	0	0	2	0	2	0
30	(Morocco)	MF	Anas Ouahim	1	0	0	0	0	0	0	0	1	0
31	(Moldova)	FW	Dan-Angelo Botan	1	0	0	0	0	0	0	0	1	0
32	(Brazil)	DF	Rodrigo Freitas	1	0	0	0	0	0	0	0	1	0
36	(Moldova)	MF	Nichita Sandetchi	0	0	1	0	0	0	0	0	1	0
55	(Uruguay)	MF	Maicol Ferreira	1	0	0	0	0	0	0	0	1	0
69	(Nigeria)	MF	Peter Ademo	1	0	0	0	0	0	0	0	1	0
77	(Moldova)	MF	Mihail Ghecev	2	0	0	0	0	0	0	0	2	0
Players away on loan:
Players who left Sheriff Tiraspol during the season:
4	(Zimbabwe)	DF	Munashe Garananga	2	0	1	0	0	0	2	0	5	0
14	(Morocco)	MF	Amine Talal	3	0	0	0	2	1	3	0	8	1
15	(Cameroon)	DF	Gaby Kiki	1	0	0	0	0	0	6	1	7	1
30	(Nigeria)	FW	David Ankeye	2	0	0	0	0	0	0	0	2	0
35	(Ukraine)	GK	Maksym Koval	1	0	0	0	1	0	1	0	3	0
90	(Moldova)	FW	Henrique Luvannor	0	0	0	0	2	1	0	0	2	1
			TOTALS	35	0	6	0	13	2	29	3	83	5
