= 2023–24 UEFA Europa League group stage =

The 2023–24 UEFA Europa League group stage began on 21 September 2023 and ended on 14 December 2023. A total of 32 teams competed in the group stage to decide 16 of the 24 places in the knockout phase of the 2023–24 UEFA Europa League.

Aris Limassol, Brighton & Hove Albion, BK Häcken, Raków Częstochowa, Servette and TSC made their debut appearances in the group stage. All six clubs also made their debut appearances in a UEFA competition group stage. Furthermore, Brighton & Hove Albion qualified for European football for the first time in their history. A total of 21 national associations were represented in the group stage.

This was the final season with the group stage format, which was replaced by the league phase format starting from the next season.

== Draw ==
The draw for the group stage was held on 1 September 2023, 13:00 CEST, in Monaco. The 32 teams were drawn into eight groups of four. For the draw, the teams were seeded into four pots, each of eight teams, based on their 2023 UEFA club coefficients. Teams from the same association could not be drawn into the same group. Prior to the draw, UEFA formed pairings of teams from the same association, including those playing in the Europa Conference League group stage (one pairing for associations with two or three teams, two pairings for associations with four or five teams), based on television audiences, where one team was drawn into Groups A–D and another team was drawn into Groups E–H, so that the two teams would have different kick-off times. The following pairings were announced by UEFA after the group stage teams were confirmed (the second team in a pairing marked by UECL played in the Europa Conference League group stage):

1. (England) West Ham United and Liverpool
2. (Italy) Roma and Atalanta
3. (Netherlands) Ajax and AZ (UECL)
4. (Spain) Villarreal and Real Betis
5. (Germany) Bayer Leverkusen and SC Freiburg
6. (Scotland) Rangers and Aberdeen (UECL)
7. (Czech Republic) Slavia Prague and Sparta Prague
8. (France) Rennes and Marseille
9. (Greece) Olympiacos and Panathinaikos
10. (Austria) LASK and Sturm Graz
11. (Norway) Molde and Bodø/Glimt (UECL)
12. (England) Brighton & Hove Albion and Aston Villa (UECL)
13. (Belgium) Union Saint-Gilloise and Club Brugge (UECL)
14. (Israel) Maccabi Haifa and Maccabi Tel Aviv (UECL)
15. (France) Toulouse and Lille (UECL)
16. (Greece) AEK Athens and PAOK (UECL)
17. (Serbia) TSC and Čukarički (UECL)
18. (Switzerland) Servette and Lugano (UECL)
19. (Poland) Raków Częstochowa and Legia Warsaw (UECL)

== Teams ==
Below were the participating teams (with their 2023 UEFA club coefficients), grouped by their seeding pot. They included:

- 12 teams which entered in this stage
- 10 winners of the play-off round
- 6 losers of the Champions League play-off round (4 from Champions Path, 2 from League Path)
- 4 League Path losers of the third qualifying round

Key to colours
Group winners advanced directly to round of 16
Group runners-up advanced to knockout round play-offs
Third-placed teams entered Europa Conference League knockout round play-offs

Pot 1
Team	Notes	Coeff.
(England) West Ham United		50.000
(England) Liverpool		123.000
(Italy) Roma		97.000
(Netherlands) Ajax		89.000
(Spain) Villarreal		82.000
(Germany) Bayer Leverkusen		72.000
(Italy) Atalanta		55.500
(Scotland) Rangers		54.000

Pot 2
Team	Notes	Coeff.
(Portugal) Sporting CP		52.500
(Czech Republic) Slavia Prague		52.000
(France) Rennes		44.000
(Greece) Olympiacos		39.000
(Spain) Real Betis		37.000
(Austria) LASK		36.000
(France) Marseille		33.000
(Azerbaijan) Qarabağ		25.000

Pot 3
Team	Notes	Coeff.
(Norway) Molde		24.000
(England) Brighton & Hove Albion		21.914
(Moldova) Sheriff Tiraspol		19.500
(Belgium) Union Saint-Gilloise		19.000
(Germany) SC Freiburg		16.496
(Czech Republic) Sparta Prague		14.000
(Israel) Maccabi Haifa		13.000
(Austria) Sturm Graz		12.500

Pot 4
Team	Notes	Coeff.
(France) Toulouse		12.232
(Greece) AEK Athens		11.000
(Serbia) TSC		6.475
(Switzerland) Servette		6.335
(Greece) Panathinaikos		5.045
(Poland) Raków Częstochowa		5.000
(Cyprus) Aris Limassol		4.895
(Sweden) BK Häcken		4.750

Notes

1. ^{EL-PO} Winners of play-off round.
2. ^{CL-CP} Losers of Champions League play-off round (Champions Path).
3. ^{CL-LP} Losers of Champions League play-off round (League Path).
4. ^{CL-LQ} Losers of Champions League third qualifying round (League Path).

== Format ==
In each group, teams played against each other home-and-away in a round-robin format. The winners of each group advanced to the round of 16, while the runners-up advanced to the knockout round play-offs. The third-placed teams were transferred to the Europa Conference League knockout round play-offs, while the fourth-placed teams were eliminated from European competitions for the season.

=== Tiebreakers ===
Teams were ranked according to points (3 points for a win, 1 point for a draw, 0 points for a loss). If two or more teams were tied on points, the following tiebreaking criteria were applied, in the order given, to determine the rankings (see Article 16 Equality of points – group stage, Regulations of the UEFA Europa League):

1. Points in head-to-head matches among the tied teams;
2. Goal difference in head-to-head matches among the tied teams;
3. Goals scored in head-to-head matches among the tied teams;
4. If more than two teams were tied, and after applying all head-to-head criteria above, a subset of teams were still tied, all head-to-head criteria above were reapplied exclusively to this subset of teams;
5. Goal difference in all group matches;
6. Goals scored in all group matches;
7. Away goals scored in all group matches;
8. Wins in all group matches;
9. Away wins in all group matches;
10. Disciplinary points (direct red card = 3 points; double yellow card = 3 points; single yellow card = 1 point);
11. UEFA club coefficient.

== Groups ==
The fixtures were announced on 2 September 2023, the day after the draw. The matches were played on 21 September, 5 October, 26 October, 9 November, 30 November and 14 December 2023. The scheduled kick-off times were 18:45 and 21:00 CET/CEST.

Times are CET/CEST, (Note: CEST (UTC+2) for dates up to 26 October 2023 (matchdays 1–3), and CET (UTC+1) for date thereafter (matchdays 4–6).) as listed by UEFA (local times, if different, are in parentheses).

=== Group A ===
Pos	Team	Pld	W	D	L	GF	GA	GD	Pts	Qualification	WHU	FRE	OLY	TSC
1	(England) West Ham United	6	5	0	1	10	4	+6	15	Advance to round of 16	—	2–0	1–0	3–1
2	(Germany) SC Freiburg	6	4	0	2	17	7	+10	12	Advance to knockout round play-offs	1–2	—	5–0	5–0
3	(Greece) Olympiacos	6	2	1	3	11	14	−3	7	Transfer to Europa Conference League	2–1	2–3	—	5–2
4	(Serbia) TSC	6	0	1	5	6	19	−13	1		0–1	1–3	2–2	—

Source: UEFA
Rules for classification: Group stage tiebreakers
21 September 2023
21:00 (20:00 UTC+1)

West Ham United (England)	3–1	(Serbia) TSC
Kudus 66', 70'; Souček 82'	Report	Stanić 48'

London Stadium, London
Attendance: 41,374
Referee: Filip Glova (Slovakia)
21 September 2023
21:00 (22:00 UTC+3)

Olympiacos (Greece)	2–3	(Germany) SC Freiburg
El Kaabi 40', 75'	Report	Sallai 9'; Grifo 45+7' (pen.); Philipp 86'

Karaiskakis Stadium, Piraeus
Attendance: 30,056
Referee: Allard Lindhout (Netherlands)

5 October 2023
18:45

SC Freiburg (Germany)	1–2	(England) West Ham United
Sallai 49'	Report	Paquetá 8'; Aguerd 66'

Europa-Park Stadion, Freiburg im Breisgau
Attendance: 34,100
Referee: Mohammed Al-Hakim (Sweden)
5 October 2023
18:45

TSC (Serbia)	2–2	(Greece) Olympiacos
Đakovac 63'; Pantović 90'	Report	Masouras 16'; Podence 57'

TSC Arena, Bačka Topola
Attendance: 3,778
Referee: Benoît Bastien (France)

26 October 2023
18:45 (19:45 UTC+3)

Olympiacos (Greece)	2–1	(England) West Ham United
Fortounis 33'; Rodinei 45+1'	Report	Paquetá 87'

Karaiskakis Stadium, Piraeus
Attendance: 30,623
Referee: Andris Treimanis (Latvia)
26 October 2023
18:45

TSC (Serbia)	1–3	(Germany) SC Freiburg
Petrović 13'	Report	Grifo 49' (pen.), 59', 73'

TSC Arena, Bačka Topola
Attendance: 3,400
Referee: Aliyar Aghayev (Azerbaijan)

9 November 2023
21:00

SC Freiburg (Germany)	5–0	(Serbia) TSC
Röhl 24'; Eggestein 56'; Weißhaupt 69'; Adamu 80'; Dōan 90+2'	Report

Europa-Park Stadion, Freiburg im Breisgau
Attendance: 31,700
Referee: Rohit Saggi (Norway)
9 November 2023
21:00 (20:00 UTC+0)

West Ham United (England)	1–0	(Greece) Olympiacos
Paquetá 73'	Report

London Stadium, London
Attendance: 55,811
Referee: Matej Jug (Slovenia)

30 November 2023
18:45

SC Freiburg (Germany)	5–0	(Greece) Olympiacos
Gregoritsch 3', 8', 36'; Sildillia 42'; Dōan 77'	Report

Europa-Park Stadion, Freiburg im Breisgau
Attendance: 34,000
Referee: Irfan Peljto (Bosnia and Herzegovina)
30 November 2023
18:45

TSC (Serbia)	0–1	(England) West Ham United
	Report	Souček 89'

TSC Arena, Bačka Topola
Attendance: 4,256
Referee: Allard Lindhout (Netherlands)

14 December 2023
21:00 (20:00 UTC+0)

West Ham United (England)	2–0	(Germany) SC Freiburg
Kudus 14'; Álvarez 42'	Report

London Stadium, London
Attendance: 48,876
Referee: João Pinheiro (Portugal)
14 December 2023
21:00 (22:00 UTC+2)

Olympiacos (Greece)	5–2	(Serbia) TSC
El Kaabi 21'; Podence 40', 42'; Ilić 46' (o.g.); El-Arabi 68'	Report	Đakovac 48'; Ćirković 61'

Karaiskakis Stadium, Piraeus
Attendance: 20
Referee: Morten Krogh (Denmark)

=== Group B ===
Pos	Team	Pld	W	D	L	GF	GA	GD	Pts	Qualification	BHA	MAR	AJA	AEK
1	(England) Brighton & Hove Albion	6	4	1	1	10	5	+5	13	Advance to round of 16	—	1–0	2–0	2–3
2	(France) Marseille	6	3	2	1	14	10	+4	11	Advance to knockout round play-offs	2–2	—	4–3	3–1
3	(Netherlands) Ajax	6	1	2	3	10	13	−3	5	Transfer to Europa Conference League	0–2	3–3	—	3–1
4	(Greece) AEK Athens	6	1	1	4	6	12	−6	4		0–1	0–2	1–1	—

Source: UEFA
Rules for classification: Group stage tiebreakers
21 September 2023
21:00

Ajax (Netherlands)	3–3	(France) Marseille
Forbs 9'; Berghuis 20'; Taylor 52'	Report	Clauss 23'; Aubameyang 38', 78'

Johan Cruyff Arena, Amsterdam
Attendance: 53,000
Referee: Maurizio Mariani (Italy)
21 September 2023
21:00 (20:00 UTC+1)

Brighton & Hove Albion (England)	2–3	(Greece) AEK Athens
João Pedro 30' (pen.), 67' (pen.)	Report	Sidibé 11'; Gaćinović 40'; Ponce 84'

Falmer Stadium, Brighton and Hove
Attendance: 30,178
Referee: Kristo Tohver (Estonia)

5 October 2023
18:45

Marseille (France)	2–2	(England) Brighton & Hove Albion
Mbemba 19'; Veretout 20'	Report	Groß 54'; João Pedro 88' (pen.)

Stade Vélodrome, Marseille
Attendance: 63,465
Referee: Mykola Balakin (Ukraine)
5 October 2023
18:45 (19:45 UTC+3)

AEK Athens (Greece)	1–1	(Netherlands) Ajax
Vida 75'	Report	Bergwijn 30' (pen.)

Agia Sophia Stadium, Athens
Attendance: 29,524
Referee: Matej Jug (Slovenia)

26 October 2023
18:45

Marseille (France)	3–1	(Greece) AEK Athens
Vitinha 27'; Harit 60' (pen.); Veretout 69' (pen.)	Report	Pineda 53'

Stade Vélodrome, Marseille
Attendance: 65,092
Referee: Daniel Stefański (Poland)
26 October 2023
21:00 (20:00 UTC+1)

Brighton & Hove Albion (England)	2–0	(Netherlands) Ajax
João Pedro 42'; Fati 53'	Report

Falmer Stadium, Brighton and Hove
Attendance: 30,540
Referee: Bartosz Frankowski (Poland)

9 November 2023
18:45

Ajax (Netherlands)	0–2	(England) Brighton & Hove Albion
	Report	Fati 15'; Adingra 53'

Johan Cruyff Arena, Amsterdam
Attendance: 52,095
Referee: Nikola Dabanović (Montenegro)
9 November 2023
21:00 (22:00 UTC+2)

AEK Athens (Greece)	0–2	(France) Marseille
	Report	Mbemba 25'; Sarr 90+3'

Agia Sophia Stadium, Athens
Attendance: 30,530
Referee: Glenn Nyberg (Sweden)

30 November 2023
18:45 (19:45 UTC+2)

AEK Athens (Greece)	0–1	(England) Brighton & Hove Albion
	Report	João Pedro 55' (pen.)

Agia Sophia Stadium, Athens
Attendance: 30,520
Referee: Sandro Schärer (Switzerland)
30 November 2023
21:00

Marseille (France)	4–3	(Netherlands) Ajax
Aubameyang 9' (pen.), 48', 90+3' (pen.); Mbemba 26'	Report	Brobbey 10', 30'; Akpom 79'

Stade Vélodrome, Marseille
Attendance: 60,638
Referee: Simone Sozza (Italy)

14 December 2023
21:00

Ajax (Netherlands)	3–1	(Greece) AEK Athens
Akpom 5', 56'; Taylor 20'	Report	García 11'

Johan Cruyff Arena, Amsterdam
Attendance: 53,926
Referee: Craig Pawson (England)
14 December 2023
21:00 (20:00 UTC+0)

Brighton & Hove Albion (England)	1–0	(France) Marseille
João Pedro 88'	Report

Falmer Stadium, Brighton and Hove
Attendance: 30,214
Referee: José María Sánchez Martínez (Spain)

=== Group C ===
Pos	Team	Pld	W	D	L	GF	GA	GD	Pts	Qualification	RAN	SPP	BET	ALI
1	(Scotland) Rangers	6	3	2	1	8	6	+2	11	Advance to round of 16	—	2–1	1–0	1–1
2	(Czech Republic) Sparta Prague	6	3	1	2	9	7	+2	10	Advance to knockout round play-offs	0–0	—	1–0	3–2
3	(Spain) Real Betis	6	3	0	3	9	7	+2	9	Transfer to Europa Conference League	2–3	2–1	—	4–1
4	(Cyprus) Aris Limassol	6	1	1	4	7	13	−6	4		2–1	1–3	0–1	—

Source: UEFA
Rules for classification: Group stage tiebreakers
21 September 2023
21:00

Sparta Prague (Czech Republic)	3–2	(Cyprus) Aris Limassol
Krejčí 20', 25'; Vitík 67'	Report	Kokorin 11' (pen.); Babicka 90'

Stadion Letná, Prague
Attendance: 17,371
Referee: Jérôme Brisard (France)
21 September 2023
21:00 (20:00 UTC+1)

Rangers (Scotland)	1–0	(Spain) Real Betis
Sima 68'	Report

Ibrox Stadium, Glasgow
Attendance: 45,634
Referee: Lawrence Visser (Belgium)

5 October 2023
18:45

Real Betis (Spain)	2–1	(Czech Republic) Sparta Prague
Diao 9'; Isco 79'	Report	Birmančević 3'

Benito Villamarín, Seville
Attendance: 45,037
Referee: Duje Strukan (Croatia)
5 October 2023
18:45 (19:45 UTC+3)

Aris Limassol (Cyprus)	2–1	(Scotland) Rangers
Moucketou-Moussounda 9'; Babicka 59'	Report	Sima 70'

Alphamega Stadium, Limassol
Attendance: 3,911
Referee: Horațiu Feșnic (Romania)

26 October 2023
18:45

Sparta Prague (Czech Republic)	0–0	(Scotland) Rangers
	Report

Stadion Letná, Prague
Attendance: 18,250
Referee: Sascha Stegemann (Germany)
26 October 2023
18:45 (19:45 UTC+3)

Aris Limassol (Cyprus)	0–1	(Spain) Real Betis
	Report	Pérez 75'

Alphamega Stadium, Limassol
Attendance: 3,945
Referee: Filip Glova (Slovakia)

9 November 2023
21:00

Real Betis (Spain)	4–1	(Cyprus) Aris Limassol
Iglesias 34'; Ruibal 64'; Roca 79'; Ezzalzouli 90+4'	Report	Kokorin 84'

Benito Villamarín, Seville
Attendance: 41,768
Referee: Mohammed Al-Hakim (Sweden)
9 November 2023
21:00 (20:00 UTC+0)

Rangers (Scotland)	2–1	(Czech Republic) Sparta Prague
Danilo 11'; Cantwell 20'	Report	Haraslín 77'

Ibrox Stadium, Glasgow
Attendance: 48,838
Referee: Davide Massa (Italy)

30 November 2023
18:45

Sparta Prague (Czech Republic)	1–0	(Spain) Real Betis
Haraslín 54'	Report

Stadion Letná, Prague
Attendance: 18,095
Referee: Nikola Dabanović (Montenegro)
30 November 2023
21:00 (20:00 UTC+0)

Rangers (Scotland)	1–1	(Cyprus) Aris Limassol
McCausland 49'	Report	Babicka 28'

Ibrox Stadium, Glasgow
Attendance: 48,890
Referee: Rohit Saggi (Norway)

14 December 2023
21:00

Real Betis (Spain)	2–3	(Scotland) Rangers
Miranda 14'; Pérez 37'	Report	Sima 10'; Dessers 20'; Roofe 78'

Benito Villamarín, Seville
Attendance: 48,380
Referee: Srđan Jovanović (Serbia)
14 December 2023
21:00 (22:00 UTC+2)

Aris Limassol (Cyprus)	1–3	(Czech Republic) Sparta Prague
Bengtsson 84'	Report	Kuchta 4'; Birmančević 11', 45+1'

Alphamega Stadium, Limassol
Attendance: 2,859
Referee: Harm Osmers (Germany)

=== Group D ===
Pos	Team	Pld	W	D	L	GF	GA	GD	Pts	Qualification	ATA	SCP	STU	RAK
1	(Italy) Atalanta	6	4	2	0	12	4	+8	14	Advance to round of 16	—	1–1	1–0	2–0
2	(Portugal) Sporting CP	6	3	2	1	10	6	+4	11	Advance to knockout round play-offs	1–2	—	3–0	2–1
3	(Austria) Sturm Graz	6	1	1	4	4	9	−5	4 (Note: Tied on head-to-head results. Overall goal difference used as a tiebreaker.)	Transfer to Europa Conference League	2–2	1–2	—	0–1
4	(Poland) Raków Częstochowa	6	1	1	4	3	10	−7	4		0–4	1–1	0–1	—

Source: UEFA
Rules for classification: Group stage tiebreakers
Notes:
21 September 2023
21:00

Atalanta (Italy)	2–0	(Poland) Raków Częstochowa
De Ketelaere 49'; Éderson 66'	Report

Stadio Atleti Azzurri d'Italia, Bergamo
Attendance: 13,698
Referee: Roi Reinshreiber (Israel)
21 September 2023
21:00

Sturm Graz (Austria)	1–2	(Portugal) Sporting CP
Bøving 58'	Report	Gyökeres 76'; Diomande 84'

Liebenauer Stadium, Graz
Attendance: 13,517
Referee: Nikola Dabanović (Montenegro)

5 October 2023
18:45 (17:45 UTC+1)

Sporting CP (Portugal)	1–2	(Italy) Atalanta
Gyökeres 76' (pen.)	Report	Scalvini 33'; Ruggeri 43'

Estádio José Alvalade, Lisbon
Attendance: 42,301
Referee: Alejandro Hernández Hernández (Spain)
5 October 2023
18:45

Raków Częstochowa (Poland)	0–1	(Austria) Sturm Graz
	Report	Bøving 24'

Zagłębiowski Park Sportowy, Sosnowiec (Note: Raków Częstochowa played their home matches at the Zagłębiowski Park Sportowy, in Sosnowiec, instead of their regular stadium, the Miejski Stadion Piłkarski "Raków", in Częstochowa, which did not meet UEFA requirements.)
Attendance: 8,993
Referee: Aliyar Aghayev (Azerbaijan)

26 October 2023
18:45

Sturm Graz (Austria)	2–2	(Italy) Atalanta
Prass 13'; Włodarczyk 80' (pen.)	Report	Muriel 34', 45+7' (pen.)

Liebenauer Stadium, Graz
Attendance: 14,167
Referee: Duje Strukan (Croatia)
26 October 2023
18:45

Raków Częstochowa (Poland)	1–1	(Portugal) Sporting CP
Piasecki 79'	Report	Coates 14'

Zagłębiowski Park Sportowy, Sosnowiec
Attendance: 10,518
Referee: Anastasios Papapetrou (Greece)

9 November 2023
21:00

Atalanta (Italy)	1–0	(Austria) Sturm Graz
Djimsiti 50'	Report

Stadio Atleti Azzurri d'Italia, Bergamo
Attendance: 14,739
Referee: Jérôme Brisard (France)
9 November 2023
21:00 (20:00 UTC+0)

Sporting CP (Portugal)	2–1	(Poland) Raków Częstochowa
Gonçalves 14' (pen.), 52' (pen.)	Report	Rundić 70'

Estádio José Alvalade, Lisbon
Attendance: 32,940
Referee: Enea Jorgji (Albania)

30 November 2023
18:45

Atalanta (Italy)	1–1	(Portugal) Sporting CP
Scamacca 23'	Report	Edwards 56'

Stadio Atleti Azzurri d'Italia, Bergamo
Attendance: 14,865
Referee: Michael Oliver (England)
30 November 2023
18:45

Sturm Graz (Austria)	0–1	(Poland) Raków Częstochowa
	Report	Yeboah 81'

Liebenauer Stadium, Graz
Attendance: 12,517
Referee: Filip Glova (Slovakia)

14 December 2023
21:00 (20:00 UTC+0)

Sporting CP (Portugal)	3–0	(Austria) Sturm Graz
Gyökeres 39'; Inácio 60', 70'	Report

Estádio José Alvalade, Lisbon
Attendance: 24,733
Referee: Willie Collum (Scotland)
14 December 2023
21:00

Raków Częstochowa (Poland)	0–4	(Italy) Atalanta
	Report	Muriel 14', 72'; Bonfanti 27'; De Ketelaere 90+2'

Zagłębiowski Park Sportowy, Sosnowiec
Attendance: 10,386
Referee: Enea Jorgji (Albania)

=== Group E ===
Pos	Team	Pld	W	D	L	GF	GA	GD	Pts	Qualification	LIV	TOU	USG	LAS
1	(England) Liverpool	6	4	0	2	17	7	+10	12	Advance to round of 16	—	5–1	2–0	4–0
2	(France) Toulouse	6	3	2	1	8	9	−1	11	Advance to knockout round play-offs	3–2	—	0–0	1–0
3	(Belgium) Union Saint-Gilloise	6	2	2	2	5	8	−3	8	Transfer to Europa Conference League	2–1	1–1	—	2–1
4	(Austria) LASK	6	1	0	5	6	12	−6	3		1–3	1–2	3–0	—

Source: UEFA
Rules for classification: Group stage tiebreakers
21 September 2023
18:45

LASK (Austria)	1–3	(England) Liverpool
Flecker 14'	Report	Núñez 56' (pen.); Díaz 63'; Salah 88'

Raiffeisen Arena, Linz
Attendance: 18,091
Referee: Marco Di Bello (Italy)
21 September 2023
18:55 (Note: The Union Saint-Gilloise v Toulouse match, originally scheduled to be played at 18:45, was postponed to 18:55 due to traffic encountered by both teams before getting to the stadium.)

Union Saint-Gilloise (Belgium)	1–1	(France) Toulouse
Amoura 69'	Report	Dallinga 45+3' (pen.)

Constant Vanden Stock Stadium, Brussels (Note: Union Saint-Gilloise played their home matches at the Constant Vanden Stock Stadium, in Brussels, instead of their regular stadium, Joseph Marien Stadium, in Brussels, which did not meet UEFA requirements.)
Attendance: 12,162
Referee: Rohit Saggi (Norway)

5 October 2023
21:00 (20:00 UTC+1)

Liverpool (England)	2–0	(Belgium) Union Saint-Gilloise
Gravenberch 44'; Jota 90+2'	Report

Anfield, Liverpool
Attendance: 49,513
Referee: Morten Krogh (Denmark)
5 October 2023
21:00

Toulouse (France)	1–0	(Austria) LASK
Suazo 31'	Report

Stadium de Toulouse, Toulouse
Attendance: 29,233
Referee: Nick Walsh (Scotland)

26 October 2023
21:00

Union Saint-Gilloise (Belgium)	2–1	(Austria) LASK
Puertas 84' (pen.); Burgess 90+4'	Report	Usor 24'

Constant Vanden Stock Stadium, Brussels
Attendance: 11,426
Referee: Atilla Karaoğlan (Turkey)
26 October 2023
21:00 (20:00 UTC+1)

Liverpool (England)	5–1	(France) Toulouse
Jota 9'; Endo 30'; Núñez 34'; Gravenberch 65'; Salah 90+3'	Report	Dallinga 16'

Anfield, Liverpool
Attendance: 49,338
Referee: Rade Obrenović (Slovenia)

9 November 2023
18:45

LASK (Austria)	3–0	(Belgium) Union Saint-Gilloise
Horvath 25' (pen.); Talovyerov 45+4'; Žulj 77'	Report

Raiffeisen Arena, Linz
Attendance: 15,900
Referee: Simone Sozza (Italy)
9 November 2023
18:45

Toulouse (France)	3–2	(England) Liverpool
Dønnum 36'; Dallinga 58'; Magri 76'	Report	Cásseres 74' (o.g.); Jota 89'

Stadium de Toulouse, Toulouse
Attendance: 32,026
Referee: Georgi Kabakov (Bulgaria)

30 November 2023
21:00 (20:00 UTC+0)

Liverpool (England)	4–0	(Austria) LASK
Díaz 12'; Gakpo 15', 90+2'; Salah 51' (pen.)	Report

Anfield, Liverpool
Attendance: 49,666
Referee: Urs Schnyder (Switzerland)
30 November 2023
21:00

Toulouse (France)	0–0	(Belgium) Union Saint-Gilloise
	Report

Stadium de Toulouse, Toulouse
Attendance: 31,205
Referee: Matej Jug (Slovenia)

14 December 2023
18:45

Union Saint-Gilloise (Belgium)	2–1	(England) Liverpool
Amoura 32'; Puertas 43'	Report	Quansah 40'

Constant Vanden Stock Stadium, Brussels
Attendance: 16,959
Referee: Orel Grinfeld (Israel)
14 December 2023
18:45

LASK (Austria)	1–2	(France) Toulouse
Ljubičić 61'	Report	Dallinga 54'; Suazo 83'

Raiffeisen Arena, Linz
Attendance: 16,100
Referee: Fabio Maresca (Italy)

=== Group F ===
Pos	Team	Pld	W	D	L	GF	GA	GD	Pts	Qualification	VIL	REN	MHA	PAO
1	(Spain) Villarreal	6	4	1	1	9	7	+2	13	Advance to round of 16	—	1–0	0–0	3–2
2	(France) Rennes	6	4	0	2	13	6	+7	12	Advance to knockout round play-offs	2–3	—	3–0	3–1
3	(Israel) Maccabi Haifa	6	1	2	3	3	9	−6	5	Transfer to Europa Conference League	1–2	0–3	—	0–0
4	(Greece) Panathinaikos	6	1	1	4	7	10	−3	4		2–0	1–2	1–2	—

Source: UEFA
Rules for classification: Group stage tiebreakers
21 September 2023
18:45

Rennes (France)	3–0	(Israel) Maccabi Haifa
Blas 1'; Truffert 31'; Yıldırım 55'	Report

Roazhon Park, Rennes
Attendance: 26,838
Referee: Harm Osmers (Germany)
21 September 2023
18:45 (19:45 UTC+3)

Panathinaikos (Greece)	2–0	(Spain) Villarreal
Ioannidis 38'; Šporar 78'	Report

Olympic Stadium, Athens (Note: Panathinaikos played their first home match at the Olympic Stadium, in Athens, instead of their regular stadium, the Leoforos Alexandras Stadium, in Athens.)
Attendance: 57,003
Referee: Craig Pawson (England)

5 October 2023
21:00

Villarreal (Spain)	1–0	(France) Rennes
Sørloth 36'	Report

Estadio de la Cerámica, Villarreal
Attendance: 17,458
Referee: Harald Lechner (Austria)
5 October 2023
21:00 (22:00 UTC+3)

Maccabi Haifa (Israel)	0–0	(Greece) Panathinaikos
	Report

Sammy Ofer Stadium, Haifa
Attendance: 29,465
Referee: António Nobre (Portugal)

26 October 2023
21:00 (22:00 UTC+3)

Panathinaikos (Greece)	1–2	(France) Rennes
Ioannidis 61' (pen.)	Report	Gouiri 7'; Kalimuendo 49'

Leoforos Alexandras Stadium, Athens
Attendance: 13,459
Referee: João Pinheiro (Portugal)

9 November 2023
18:45

Rennes (France)	3–1	(Greece) Panathinaikos
Rieder 9'; Salah 65'; Blas 70' (pen.)	Report	Ioannidis 34' (pen.)

Roazhon Park, Rennes
Attendance: 28,004
Referee: Willie Collum (Scotland)
9 November 2023
18:45 (19:45 UTC+2)

Maccabi Haifa (Israel)	1–2	(Spain) Villarreal
Seck 30'	Report	Baena 82'; Sørloth 86'

AEK Arena, Larnaca, Cyprus (Note: Due to the Gaza war, Maccabi Haifa played their last two home matches at a neutral venue.)
Attendance: 0 (Note: The match was played behind closed doors.)
Referee: Mykola Balakin (Ukraine)

30 November 2023
18:45

Maccabi Haifa (Israel)	0–3	(France) Rennes
	Report	Terrier 29'; Gouiri 47'; Rieder 90+3'

Puskás Aréna, Budapest, Hungary
Attendance: 0 (Note: The match was played behind closed doors.)
Referee: Horațiu Feșnic (Romania)
30 November 2023
21:00

Villarreal (Spain)	3–2	(Greece) Panathinaikos
Baena 29'; Comesaña 34'; Morales 47'	Report	Palacios 66'; Ioannidis 81'

Estadio de la Cerámica, Villarreal
Attendance: 16,993
Referee: Ivan Kružliak (Slovakia)

6 December 2023 (Note: The Villarreal v Maccabi Haifa match, originally scheduled to be played on 26 October 2023, was rescheduled to 6 December 2023.)
21:00

Villarreal (Spain)	0–0	(Israel) Maccabi Haifa
	Report

Estadio de la Cerámica, Villarreal
Attendance: 9,365
Referee: Nick Walsh (Scotland)

14 December 2023
18:45

Rennes (France)	2–3	(Spain) Villarreal
Assignon 37'; Blas 79'	Report	Gerard 36' (pen.); Akhomach 62'; Parejo 80'

Roazhon Park, Rennes
Attendance: 27,761
Referee: Atilla Karaoğlan (Turkey)
14 December 2023
18:45 (19:45 UTC+2)

Panathinaikos (Greece)	1–2	(Israel) Maccabi Haifa
Ioannidis 89'	Report	David 20'; Chery 74'

Leoforos Alexandras Stadium, Athens
Attendance: 13,121
Referee: Georgi Kabakov (Bulgaria)

=== Group G ===
Pos	Team	Pld	W	D	L	GF	GA	GD	Pts	Qualification	SLP	ROM	SRV	SHE
1	(Czech Republic) Slavia Prague	6	5	0	1	17	4	+13	15	Advance to round of 16	—	2–0	4–0	6–0
2	(Italy) Roma	6	4	1	1	12	4	+8	13	Advance to knockout round play-offs	2–0	—	4–0	3–0
3	(Switzerland) Servette	6	1	2	3	4	13	−9	5	Transfer to Europa Conference League	0–2	1–1	—	2–1
4	(Moldova) Sheriff Tiraspol	6	0	1	5	5	17	−12	1		2–3	1–2	1–1	—

Source: UEFA
Rules for classification: Group stage tiebreakers
21 September 2023
18:45

Servette (Switzerland)	0–2	(Czech Republic) Slavia Prague
	Report	Masopust 32'; Ogbu 59'

Stade de Genève, Geneva
Attendance: 19,783
Referee: Giorgi Kruashvili (Georgia)
21 September 2023
18:45 (19:45 UTC+3)

Sheriff Tiraspol (Moldova)	1–2	(Italy) Roma
Tovar 57'	Report	Kiki 45+4' (o.g.); Lukaku 65'

Sheriff Arena, Tiraspol
Attendance: 10,711
Referee: Andris Treimanis (Latvia)

5 October 2023
21:00

Roma (Italy)	4–0	(Switzerland) Servette
Lukaku 21'; Belotti 46', 59'; Pellegrini 52'	Report

Stadio Olimpico, Rome
Attendance: 55,764
Referee: Igor Pajač (Croatia)
5 October 2023
21:00

Slavia Prague (Czech Republic)	6–0	(Moldova) Sheriff Tiraspol
Chytil 4', 71'; Ogbu 7'; Garananga 39' (o.g.); Schranz 47'; Douděra 58'	Report

Fortuna Arena, Prague
Attendance: 17,844
Referee: Willy Delajod (France)

26 October 2023
21:00

Roma (Italy)	2–0	(Czech Republic) Slavia Prague
Bove 1'; Lukaku 17'	Report

Stadio Olimpico, Rome
Attendance: 64,934
Referee: Espen Eskås (Norway)
26 October 2023
21:00 (22:00 UTC+3)

Sheriff Tiraspol (Moldova)	1–1	(Switzerland) Servette
Ankeye 80'	Report	Crivelli 41'

Sheriff Arena, Tiraspol
Attendance: 2,834
Referee: John Brooks (England)

9 November 2023
18:45

Servette (Switzerland)	2–1	(Moldova) Sheriff Tiraspol
Rouiller 84'; Bedia 90+3' (pen.)	Report	Severin 12' (o.g.)

Stade de Genève, Geneva
Attendance: 15,822
Referee: Manfredas Lukjančukas (Lithuania)
9 November 2023
18:45

Slavia Prague (Czech Republic)	2–0	(Italy) Roma
Jurečka 50'; Masopust 74'	Report

Fortuna Arena, Prague
Attendance: 19,265
Referee: François Letexier (France)

30 November 2023
21:00

Servette (Switzerland)	1–1	(Italy) Roma
Bedia 50'	Report	Lukaku 21'

Stade de Genève, Geneva
Attendance: 28,534
Referee: Daniel Stefański (Poland)
30 November 2023
21:00 (22:00 UTC+2)

Sheriff Tiraspol (Moldova)	2–3	(Czech Republic) Slavia Prague
Tovar 45+3'; Ngom Mbekeli 56'	Report	Jurečka 19'; Zafeiris 78'; Tijani 90+5' (pen.)

Sheriff Arena, Tiraspol
Attendance: 1,520
Referee: Christian-Petru Ciochirca (Austria)

14 December 2023
18:45

Roma (Italy)	3–0	(Moldova) Sheriff Tiraspol
Lukaku 11'; Belotti 32'; Pisilli 90+3'	Report

Stadio Olimpico, Rome
Attendance: 47,803
Referee: Jérôme Brisard (France)
14 December 2023
18:45

Slavia Prague (Czech Republic)	4–0	(Switzerland) Servette
Douděra 15'; Schranz 25'; Chytil 30', 45+1'	Report

Fortuna Arena, Prague
Attendance: 18,380
Referee: Nick Walsh (Scotland)

=== Group H ===
Pos	Team	Pld	W	D	L	GF	GA	GD	Pts	Qualification	LEV	QAR	MOL	HAC
1	(Germany) Bayer Leverkusen	6	6	0	0	19	3	+16	18	Advance to round of 16	—	5–1	5–1	4–0
2	(Azerbaijan) Qarabağ	6	3	1	2	7	9	−2	10	Advance to knockout round play-offs	0–1	—	1–0	2–1
3	(Norway) Molde	6	2	1	3	12	12	0	7	Transfer to Europa Conference League	1–2	2–2	—	5–1
4	(Sweden) BK Häcken	6	0	0	6	3	17	−14	0		0–2	0–1	1–3	—

Source: UEFA
Rules for classification: Group stage tiebreakers
21 September 2023
18:45

Bayer Leverkusen (Germany)	4–0	(Sweden) BK Häcken
Wirtz 10'; Adli 16'; Boniface 66'; Hofmann 70'	Report

BayArena, Leverkusen
Attendance: 25,402
Referee: Manfredas Lukjančukas (Lithuania)
21 September 2023
18:45 (20:45 UTC+4)

Qarabağ (Azerbaijan)	1–0	(Norway) Molde
L. Andrade 56'	Report

Tofiq Bahramov Republican Stadium, Baku
Attendance: 26,500
Referee: John Beaton (Scotland)

5 October 2023
21:00

Molde (Norway)	1–2	(Germany) Bayer Leverkusen
Breivik 87'	Report	Frimpong 14'; Tella 18'

Aker Stadion, Molde
Attendance: 8,190
Referee: Anastasios Papapetrou (Greece)
5 October 2023
21:00

BK Häcken (Sweden)	0–1	(Azerbaijan) Qarabağ
	Report	Juninho 70'

Ullevi, Gothenburg (Note: BK Häcken played their home matches at the Ullevi, in Gothenburg, instead of their regular stadium, the Bravida Arena, in Gothenburg, which did not meet UEFA requirements.)
Attendance: 8,124
Referee: Sebastian Gishamer (Austria)

26 October 2023
18:45

Molde (Norway)	5–1	(Sweden) BK Häcken
Gulbrandsen 6'; Eikrem 27', 55'; Breivik 30'; Bjørnbak 90+3'	Report	Sonko 21'

Aker Stadion, Molde
Attendance: 5,870
Referee: Urs Schnyder (Switzerland)
26 October 2023
21:00

Bayer Leverkusen (Germany)	5–1	(Azerbaijan) Qarabağ
Wirtz 6'; Grimaldo 29', 55'; Boniface 36'; Tapsoba 57'	Report	Bayramov 16' (pen.)

BayArena, Leverkusen
Attendance: 29,039
Referee: Horațiu Feșnic (Romania)

9 November 2023
18:45 (21:45 UTC+4)

Qarabağ (Azerbaijan)	0–1	(Germany) Bayer Leverkusen
	Report	Boniface 90+4' (pen.)

Tofiq Bahramov Republican Stadium, Baku
Attendance: 30,055
Referee: Craig Pawson (England)
9 November 2023
21:00

BK Häcken (Sweden)	1–3	(Norway) Molde
Hrstić 65'	Report	Gulbrandsen 16'; Eriksen 24', 86'

Ullevi, Gothenburg
Attendance: 5,106
Referee: Don Robertson (Scotland)

30 November 2023
21:00

Molde (Norway)	2–2	(Azerbaijan) Qarabağ
Eriksen 82', 87'	Report	Juninho 12'; Mustafazadə 90+5'

Aker Stadion, Molde
Attendance: 5,291
Referee: Erik Lambrechts (Belgium)
30 November 2023
21:00

BK Häcken (Sweden)	0–2	(Germany) Bayer Leverkusen
	Report	Boniface 14'; Schick 74'

Ullevi, Gothenburg
Attendance: 11,234
Referee: Julian Weinberger (Austria)

14 December 2023
18:45

Bayer Leverkusen (Germany)	5–1	(Norway) Molde
Schick 6'; Tapsoba 22'; Ellingsen 25' (o.g.); Hložek 60', 70'	Report	Kitolano 75'

BayArena, Leverkusen
Attendance: 28,504
Referee: Robert Jones (England)
14 December 2023
18:45 (21:45 UTC+4)

Qarabağ (Azerbaijan)	2–1	(Sweden) BK Häcken
L. Andrade 1'; Benzia 45+4'	Report	Guseynov 90+4' (o.g.)

Tofiq Bahramov Republican Stadium, Baku
Attendance: 28,515
Referee: Juxhin Xhaja (Albania)
