= Rodrigo Freitas (footballer, born 1998) =

Brazilian footballer

Personal information
- Full name: Rodrigo dos Santos de Freitas
- Date of birth: 17 June 1998 (age 28)
- Place of birth: Salvador, Brazil
- Height: 1.88 m (6 ft 2 in)
- Position: Centre-back

Youth career
- 2012–2018: São Paulo

Senior career*
| Years | Team | Apps | (Gls) |
| 2018–2021 | São Paulo | 4 | (1) |
| 2019–2020 | → Portimonense (loan) | 8 | (0) |
| 2022 | Avaí | 10 | (0) |
| 2023–2024 | Chapecoense | 31 | (2) |
| 2024 | Sheriff Tiraspol | 7 | (0) |
| 2024–2025 | Mafra | 26 | (0) |
- * Club domestic league appearances and goals as of 5 June 2025

Rodrigo dos Santos de Freitas (born 17 June 1998), known as Rodrigo Freitas or just Rodrigo, is a Brazilian professional footballer who plays as a centre-back.

== Club career ==
=== São Paulo ===
Rodrigo joined São Paulo's youth ranks at age 14. Between 2017 and 2018, he was the captain of the under-20 squad. In 2018, after his 20th anniversary, he was promoted to the first team.

Rodrigo made his first team debut for Tricolor on 3 February 2019, starting in a 1–0 Campeonato Paulista home win over São Bento.

==== Loan to Portimonense ====
On 25 June 2019, Rodrigo joined Primeira Liga club Portimonense on loan. He made his debut for the club on 19 August 2019 during a 2-1 league win over C.D. Tondela.

Rodrigo featured in eight league matches for the side before returning in July 2020.

==== Return from loan ====
Rodrigo was included in the first team squad after his loan ended, but only started to feature again for the first in 2021. He scored his first goal for São Paulo on 25 April 2021, netting the opener in a 3–0 away win over Ituano.

Rodrigo left the club in December 2021, as his contract expired.

=== Avaí ===
On 8 April 2022, free agent Rodrigo signed a contract with Avaí also in the Série A, until the end of the year.

=== Sheriff Tiraspol ===
On 19 January 2024, Moldovan Super Liga club Sheriff Tiraspol announced the signings of Freitas alongside Tyler Reid, Ramon Vinicius, Maicol Ferreira and Thierry Nevers.

=== Mafra ===
On 4 July 2024, Liga Portugal 2 club Mafra announced the signing of Freitas.

== Honours ==
São Paulo

- Campeonato Paulista: 2021
