= Mateo Ortíz =

Ecuadorian footballer (born 2000)

Personal information
- Full name: Luis Mateo Ortíz Lara
- Date of birth: 31 January 2000 (age 26)
- Place of birth: Guayaquil, Ecuador
- Height: 1.84 m (6 ft 0 in)
- Position: Midfielder

Team information
- Current team: Manta

Youth career
- –2014: Asociación de Fútbol del Guayas
- 2016–2018: Rocafuerte
- 2016–2017: → C.S. Emelec (loan)
- 2018–2019: Independiente del Valle

Senior career*
Years	Team	Apps	(Gls)
2019–2021	Independiente Juniors	45	(4)
2020–2024	Independiente del Valle	20	(1)
2023	→ Honka (loan)	27	(2)
2024	→ Sheriff Tiraspol (loan)	4	(0)
2025–	Manta	4	(0)
- * Club domestic league appearances and goals as of 28 April 2025

Luis Mateo Ortíz Lara (born 31 January 2000) is an Ecuadorian professional footballer who plays as a midfielder for Manta in Ecuadorian Serie A.

== Club career ==
Ortíz started his senior career in his native Ecuador in the Independiente del Valle organisation and with the club's reserve team Independiente Juniors, playing in Ecuadorian Serie B in 2019. He debuted with the first team in Ecuadorian Serie A next year in 2020.

Ortíz joined Finnish club Honka on loan on March 9, 2023. Ortiz scored his first goal in the Veikkausliiga on June 28, 2023, against Vaasan Palloseura (VPS).

Ortíz joined Sheriff Tiraspol in Moldovan Super Liga on loan on January 22, 2024. On 24 July 2024, Sheriff announced that Ortiz's loan had been ended.

In January 2025, Ortíz joined Manta in Ecuadorian Serie A.

== Career statistics ==
As of 28 April 2025

Appearances and goals by club, season and competition
Club	Season	League			National cup (Note: Includes Copa Ecuador, Suomen Cup and Moldovan Cup)		Continental		Total	
Club	Season	Division	Apps	Goals	Apps	Goals	Apps	Goals	Apps	Goals
Independiente Juniors	2019	Ecuadorian Serie B	22	3	2	0	–		24	3
Independiente Juniors	2020	Ecuadorian Serie B	13	1	–		–		13	1
Independiente Juniors	2021	Ecuadorian Serie B	10	0	–		–		10	0
Independiente Juniors	Total		45	4	2	0	–	–	47	4
Independiente del Valle	2020	Ecuadorian Serie A	1	0	0	0	–		1	0
Independiente del Valle	2021	Ecuadorian Serie A	6	0	0	0	0	0	6	0
Independiente del Valle	2022	Ecuadorian Serie A	13	1	5	0	5 (Note: Includes Copa Libertadores and Copa Sudamericana)	0	23	1
Independiente del Valle	Total		20	1	5	0	5	0	30	1
Honka (loan)	2023	Veikkausliiga	27	2	4	0	2 (Note: Includes UEFA Europa Conference League)	0	33	2
Sheriff Tiraspol (loan)	2023–24	Moldovan Super Liga	4	0	2	0	–		6	0
Manta	2025	Ecuadorian Serie A	4	0	0	0	–		4	0
Career total			100	7	13	0	7	0	120	7

== Honours ==
Independiente del Valle

- Copa Sudamericana: 2022

Honka

- Finnish Cup runner-up: 2023
