= Abdoul Moumouni =

Nigerien footballer

Personal information
- Full name: Abdoul Moumouni Amadou Darankoum
- Date of birth: 7 August 2002 (age 24)
- Height: 1.75 m (5 ft 9 in)
- Position: Defensive midfielder

Team information
- Current team: Mesaimeer
- Number: 12

Senior career*
Years	Team	Apps	(Gls)
2018–2021	US GN		
2021–2024	Sheriff Tiraspol	22	(1)
2024–2026	Mesaimeer	13	(1)
2026	AS Soliman		

International career^{‡}
2019–	Niger	25	(0)
- * Club domestic league appearances and goals as of 17 August 2024 ‡ National team caps and goals as of 7 August 2026

Abdoul Moumouni Amadou Darankoum (born 7 August 2002) is a Nigerien professional footballer who plays as a defensive midfielder.

== Club career ==
Moumouni started his career with Nigerien club US GN in 2018. On 16 September 2021, he signed for Moldovan National Division club Sheriff Tiraspol.

On 16 August 2024, Qatari Second Division club Mesaimeer announced the signing of Moumouni.

== International career ==
On 22 September 2019, he made his debut for the Niger national team in an African Nations Championship qualification match against the Ivory Coast.

== Career statistics ==
=== Club ===
As of match played 12 November 2023

Appearances and goals by club, season and competition
Club	Season	League			Cup		Continental		Other		Total	
Club	Season	Division	Apps	Goals	Apps	Goals	Apps	Goals	Apps	Goals	Apps	Goals
Sheriff Tiraspol	2021–22	Moldovan Super Liga	4	0	1	0	0 (Note: Zero appearances and goals in the UEFA Champions League and UEFA Europa League.)	0	0 (Note: Appearances in the Moldovan Super Cup)	0	5	0
Sheriff Tiraspol	2022–23	Moldovan Super Liga	9	0	4	0	3 (Note: Zero appearances and goals in the UEFA Champions League, zero appearances and goals in the UEFA Europa League and three appearances and zero goals in the UEFA Europa Conference League.)	0	–		16	0
Sheriff Tiraspol	2023–24	Moldovan Super Liga	9	1	0	0	0 (Note: Zero appearances and goals in the UEFA Champions League and UEFA Europa League.)	0	–		9	1
Sheriff Tiraspol	Total		18	1	4	0	3	0	-	-	25	1
Career total			18	1	4	0	3	0	-	-	25	1

=== International ===
As of match played 10 June 2025

National team	Year	Apps	Goals
Niger	2019	1	0
Niger	2020	–	
Niger	2021	8	0
Niger	2022	2	0
Niger	2023	5	0
Niger	2024	4	0
Niger	2025	3	0
Total		25	0
