= Konstantinos Apostolakis =

Greek footballer (born 1999)

Personal information
- Date of birth: 28 May 1999 (age 27)
- Place of birth: Athens, Greece
- Height: 1.78 m (5 ft 10 in)
- Position: Right-back

Team information
- Current team: A.E. Kifisia
- Number: 2

Youth career
- 2014–2018: Panathinaikos

Senior career*
Years	Team	Apps	(Gls)
2018–2020	Panathinaikos	13	(0)
2020–2021	APOEL	8	(0)
2021–2023	Panetolikos	40	(0)
2023–2024	Sheriff Tiraspol	11	(0)
2025–2026	AEL	14	(1)
2026–	A.E. Kifisia	3	(0)

International career
2015	Greece U16	2	(0)
2015–2016	Greece U17	7	(0)
2017	Greece U18	3	(0)
2018	Greece U19	4	(0)
2019–2020	Greece U21	8	(0)
- * Club domestic league appearances and goals as of 13 September 2026

Konstantinos Apostolakis (Greek: Κωνσταντίνος Αποστολάκης; born 28 May 1999) is a Greek professional footballer who plays as a right-back for Super League club A.E. Kifisia.

== Career ==
=== Panathinaikos ===
Apostolakis plays mainly as a right-back and joined Panathinaikos from the team's youth ranks.

=== APOEL ===
On 7 May 2020, Apostolakis signed a three-year contract with Cypriot giants APOEL for an undisclosed fee. At the end of his first season, he mutually solved his contract with the club.

=== Panetolikos ===
On 17 August 2021, Apostolakis signed a two-year contract with Panetolikos for an undisclosed fee.

== Personal life ==
Apostolakis' father is the former professional footballer Stratos.

== Career statistics ==
As of match played on 11 May 2024

Club	Season	League			National cup (Note: Includes Greek Cup, Cypriot Cup, Cupa Moldovei)		Continental		Other		Total	
Club	Season	Division	Apps	Goals	Apps	Goals	Apps	Goals	Apps	Goals	Apps	Goals
Panathinaikos	2018–19	Super League Greece	2	0	3	0	—		—		5	0
Panathinaikos	2019–20	Super League Greece	6	0	2	0	—		—		8	0
Panathinaikos	Total		8	0	5	0	—		—		13	0
APOEL	2020–21	Cypriot First Division	7	0	1	1	—		—		8	1
Panetolikos	2021–22	Super League Greece	19	0	2	0	—		—		21	0
Panetolikos	2022–23	Super League Greece	21	0	1	0	—		—		22	0
Panetolikos	Total		40	0	3	0	—		—		43	0
Sheriff Tiraspol	2023–24	Moldovan Super Liga	11	0	3	0	13 (Note: Four appearances in UEFA Champions League, nine appearances in UEFA Europa League)	0	—		27	0
Career total			66	0	12	1	13	0	0	0	91	1
