= Wilinton Aponzá =

Colombian footballer (born 2000)

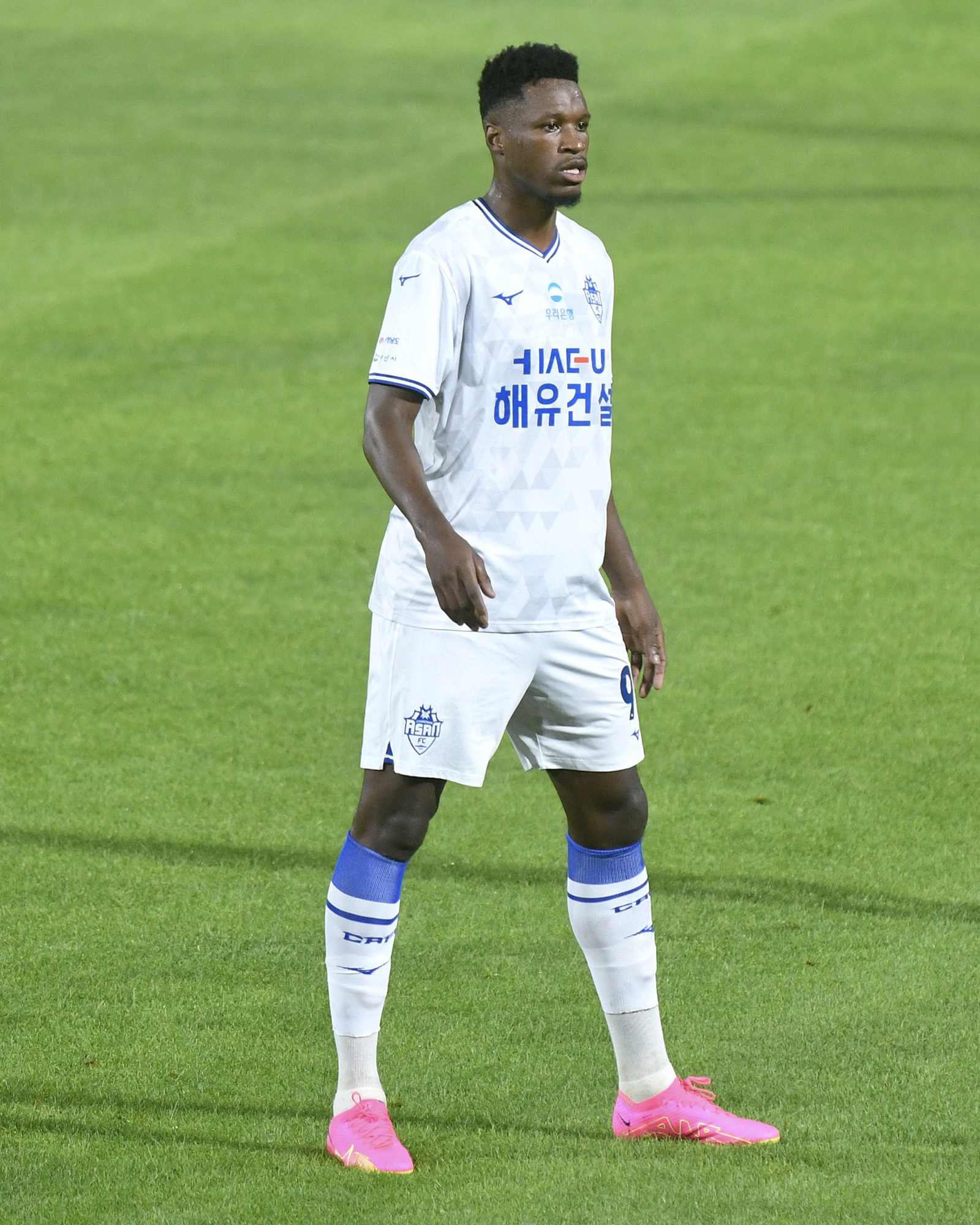
- Aponzá with Chungnam Asan in 2023

Personal information
- Full name: Wilinton Aponzá Carabali
- Date of birth: 29 March 2000 (age 26)
- Place of birth: Cali, Colombia
- Height: 1.93 m (6 ft 4 in)
- Position: Forward

Team information
- Current team: Athletic

Youth career
- –2019: América de Cali

Senior career*
Years	Team	Apps	(Gls)
2020–2021	Berço	19	(4)
2021–2023	Portimonense	22	(1)
2022–2023	→ Covilhã (loan)	24	(8)
2023	→ Chungnam Asan (loan)	12	(1)
2024	Sheriff Tiraspol	6	(1)
2024	Torpedo Moscow	6	(0)
2024–2025	Niki Volos	17	(3)
2025–2026	Maccabi Herzliya	34	(8)
2026–	Athletic	14	(4)
- * Club domestic league appearances and goals as of 18 November 2026

Wilinton Aponzá Carabali (born 29 March 2000) is a Colombian professional footballer who plays as a forward for Brazilian Série B club Athletic.

== Professional career ==
Aponzá is a youth product of the Colombian club América de Cali, before moving to Portugal with Berço in 2019. On 28 April 2021, he transferred to Portimonense in the Primeira Liga. He made his professional debut with Portimonense in a 1–0 Primeira Liga loss to F.C. Paços de Ferreira on 29 August 2021.

On 1 February 2024, Aponzá joined Moldovan Super Liga club Sheriff Tiraspol.
