= Jerome Ngom Mbekeli =

Cameroonian footballer

Personal information
- Full name: Jerome Ngom Mbekeli
- Date of birth: 30 September 1998 (age 28)
- Place of birth: Yaoundé, Cameroon
- Height: 1.74 m (5 ft 9 in)
- Position: Midfielder

Team information
- Current team: Nanjing City
- Number: 10

Senior career*
Years	Team	Apps	(Gls)
2016–2018	APEJES Academy		
2018–2019	MFK Vyškov		
2019	Swope Park Rangers	19	(2)
2020	San Diego Loyal	1	(0)
2021	APEJES Academy		
2022–2023	Colombe Sportive		
2023	Beveren	7	(0)
2023–2025	Sheriff Tiraspol	24	(3)
2025	Meizhou Hakka	27	(5)
2026–	Nanjing City	27	(9)

International career^{‡}
2022–	Cameroon	7	(1)
- * Club domestic league appearances and goals as of 7 November 2026 ‡ National team caps and goals as of 5 July 2023

Jerome Ngom Mbekeli (born 30 September 1998) is a Cameroonian footballer who plays as a midfielder for Nanjing City in the China League One.

== Club career ==
=== Swope Park Rangers ===
In January 2019, Mbekeli joined USL Championship club Swope Park Rangers. After scoring twice against Bethlehem Steel, he was named to the USL Championship Team of the Week.

=== Sheriff Tiraspol ===
On 5 July 2023, Sheriff Tiraspol announced the singing of Ngom Mbekeli from Beveren.

=== Nanjing City ===
On 6 February 2026, Mbekeli joined China League One club Nanjing City.

== International career ==
Mbekeli was named to Cameroon's roster for the 2022 FIFA World Cup. He was one of the few amateur players at the tournament, making approximately the minimum wage in his home nation of Cameroon.

== Career statistics ==
=== Club ===
As of match played 7 November 2026

Appearances and goals by club, season and competition
Club	Season	League			Cup		Continental		Total	
Club	Season	Division	Apps	Goals	Apps	Goals	Apps	Goals	Apps	Goals
Sporting Kansas City II	2019	USL Championship	19	2	0	0	—		19	2
San Diego Loyal	2020	USL Championship	1	0	0	0	—		1	0
S.K. Beveren	2022–23	Challenger Pro League	7	0	0	0	—		7	0
Sheriff	2023–24	Moldovan Super Liga	17	3	2	0	13 (Note: Includes four appearances and one goal in UEFA Champions League and nine appearances and two goals in UEFA Europa League)	3	32	6
Sheriff	2024–25	Moldovan Super Liga	7	0	0	0	3 (Note: Includes one appearance in the UEFA Europa League and two appearances in the UEFA Conference League)	0	10	0
Sheriff	Total		24	3	2	0	16	3	42	6
Meizhou Hakka	2025	Chinese Super League	27	5	0	0	—		27	5
Nanjing City	2026	China League One	27	9	0	0	—		27	9
Career Total			105	19	2	0	16	3	123	22

=== International ===
As of match played 12 October 2023

Appearances and goals by national team and year
National team	Year	Apps	Goals
Cameroon	2022	3	0
Cameroon	2023	5	1
Total		8	1

Scores and results list Cameroon's goal tally first, score column indicates score after each Mbekeli goal.

List of international goals scored by Jerome Ngom Mbekeli
No.	Date	Venue	Opponent	Score	Result	Competition	Ref.
1	16 January 2023	Miloud Hadefi Stadium, Oran, Algeria	Congo	1–0	1–0	2022 African Nations Championship	
