= Bernardo Vilar =

Brazilian footballer (born 1998)

Personal information
- Full name: Bernardo Vilar Estevão Jerônimo
- Date of birth: 12 February 1998 (age 28)
- Place of birth: Belo Horizonte, Brazil
- Height: 1.92 m (6 ft 4 in)
- Position: Centre-back

Team information
- Current team: PT Prachuap
- Number: 3

Youth career
- América Mineiro
- Atlético Mineiro
- Cruzeiro
- 2016: Araxá
- 2017–2018: Vila Nova
- 2018: Serranense

Senior career*
Years	Team	Apps	(Gls)
2019	Votuporanguense		
2020–2021	IFK Värnamo	30	(3)
2021–2022	IFK Göteborg	6	(1)
2022–2025	IFK Värnamo	17	(0)
2023	→ Helsingborgs IF (loan)	10	(0)
2024	→ Sheriff Tiraspol (loan)	7	(2)
2024–2025	→ Al-Nasr (loan)		
2025	Västerås SK	16	(0)
2025–	PT Prachuap	19	(3)
- * Club domestic league appearances and goals as of 3 May 2026

Bernardo Vilar Estevão Jerônimo (born 12 February 1998) is a Brazilian professional footballer who plays as a centre-back for Thai League 1 club PT Prachuap.

== Career ==
On 25 January 2024, Sheriff Tiraspol announced the signing of Vilar.
