= Cristian Tovar =

Colombian footballer (born 2003)

Personal information
- Full name: Cristian Camilo Tovar Angola
- Date of birth: 6 May 1998 (age 28)
- Place of birth: Villavicencio, Colombia
- Height: 1.82 m (6 ft 0 in)
- Position: Defender

Team information
- Current team: América de Cali
- Number: 6

Senior career*
Years	Team	Apps	(Gls)
2017	Deportes Tolima	3	(0)
2019–2023	Deportivo Pasto	106	(2)
2023–2025	Sheriff Tiraspol	19	(1)
2024	→ Ordabasy (loan)	5	(0)
2025–	América de Cali	22	(1)

International career^{‡}
2015	Colombia U17		
- * Club domestic league appearances and goals as of 11 December 2025 ‡ National team caps and goals as of 8 December 2024

Cristian Tovar (born 6 May 1998) is a Colombian footballer who plays as a defender for América de Cali.

== Career ==
Born in Villavicencio, he made his Categoría Primera A debut for Deportes Tolima in 2017. He also represented Colombia U17 at the 2015 South American U-17 Championship. He also trained with Colombia U20. He later played over 100 games for Deportivo Pasto between 2019 and 2023.

Establishing himself as a regular in Deportivo Pasto, Tovar was called up to a Colombia national team training microcycle. This also earned him a move to Europe, striking a deal with FC Sheriff Tiraspol. Deportivo Pasto also earned money from a summer 2023 transfer, as opposed to a winter 2024 transfer when Tovar would have been out of contract.

He played 19 games, scoring once, during the 2023–24 Moldovan Super Liga and also scored once for Sheriff in the 2023–24 UEFA Europa League group stage. In 2024 he was loaned out to FC Ordabasy of Kazakhstan. Following 9 games across all competitions, and one assist, the loan at Ordabasy was not renewed.

On 12 January 2025, Tovar returned to Colombia and signed with América de Cali.
