= Munashe Garananga =

Zimbabwean footballer (born 2001)

Personal information
- Full name: Munashe Peter Garananga
- Date of birth: 18 January 2001 (age 25)
- Place of birth: Harare, Zimbabwe
- Height: 1.86 m (6 ft 1 in)
- Position: Centre-back

Team information
- Current team: Lyngby (on loan from Copenhagen)
- Number: 24

Youth career
- Ubuntu Cape Town

Senior career*
Years	Team	Apps	(Gls)
–2022	Ubuntu Cape Town		
2022–2023	Dynamo Brest	24	(2)
2023	Sheriff Tiraspol	12	(0)
2024	Mechelen	16	(0)
2024–	Copenhagen	17	(1)
2026	→ Hibernian (loan)	2	(0)
2026–	→ Lyngby (loan)	7	(0)

International career^{‡}
2023–	Zimbabwe	22	(1)
- * Club domestic league appearances and goals as of 16:54, 12 October 2026 (UTC) ‡ National team caps and goals as of 28 September 2026

Munashe Peter Garananga (born 18 January 2001) is a Zimbabwean professional footballer who plays as a centre-back for Danish Superliga club Lyngby on loan from Copenhagen, and the Zimbabwe national team.

== Club career ==
After spending his youth in the Prince Edward Academy, in 2016 he moved to South Africa, wearing the Ubuntu Cape Town shirt until 2021.

In 2022, Garananga moved to Belarusian side Dynamo Brest, playing as a starter throughout the season.

On 13 January 2023, Garananga signed for Sheriff Tiraspol, formation of the Moldovan Super Liga, with whom he also played four games in the Conference League.

On 1 February 2024, Garananga signed for K.V. Mechelen in the Belgian Pro League for a fee of €500,000.

On 9 July 2024, Garananga joined Danish Superliga club Copenhagen for a reported fee in the region of €4 million, signing a four-year deal.

Garananga was loaned to Scottish Premiership club Hibernian on 2 February 2026.

On 13 August 2026, Garananga was loaned out to Danish side Lyngby Boldklub for the 2026-27 season. He managed 8 league matches with Lyngby before suffering a season-ending injury

== International career ==
On 11 December 2025, Garananga was called up to the Zimbabwe squad for the 2025 Africa Cup of Nations.

== Career statistics ==
=== Club ===
As of match played 2 November 2026

Appearances and goals by club, season and competition
Club	Season	League			National cup		Continental		Other		Total	
Club	Season	Division	Apps	Goals	Apps	Goals	Apps	Goals	Apps	Goals	Apps	Goals
Dynamo Brest	2022	Belarusian Premier League	24	2	2	0	–		–		26	2
Dynamo Brest	2023	Belarusian Premier League	0	0	2	0	0	0	—		2	0
Dynamo Brest	Total		24	2	4	0	0	0	0	0	28	2
Sheriff Tiraspol	2022–23	Moldovan Super Liga	5	0	5	0	4 (Note: Appearances in UEFA Conference League)	0	–		14	0
Sheriff Tiraspol	2023–24	Moldovan Super Liga	16	0	1	2	14 (Note: Four appearances in UEFA Champions League, ten appearances in UEFA Europa League)	0	0	0	31	2
Sheriff Tiraspol	Total		12	0	6	2	18	0	0	0	36	2
Mechelen	2023–24	Belgian Pro League	16	0	0	0	—		—		16	0
Copenhagen	2024–25	Danish Superliga	11	0	5	0	4	0	—		20	0
Copenhagen	2025–26	Danish Superliga	5	1	1	0	6 (Note: Appearances in UEFA Champions League)	0	—		12	1
Copenhagen	2026–27	Danish Superliga	1	0	0	0	2	0	—		3	0
Copenhagen	Total		17	1	6	0	12	0	—		35	1
Hibernian (loan)	2025–26	Scottish Premiership	2	0	—		—		—		2	0
Lyngby (loan)	2026–27	Danish Superliga	8	0	—		—		—		8	0
Career total			79	3	16	2	30	0	0	0	115	5

=== International ===
As of 30 May 2026

Appearances and goals by national team and year
National team	Year	Apps	Goals
Zimbabwe	2023	1	0
Zimbabwe	2024	7	0
Zimbabwe	2025	7	1
Zimbabwe	2026	5	0
Total		20	1

Scores and results list Zimbabwe goal tally first, score column indicates score after each Garanaga goal

List of international goals scored by Munashe Garanaga
No.	Date	Venue	Opponent	Score	Result	Competition
1	17 November 2025	Abdullah bin Khalifa Stadium, Doha, Qatar	Qatar	1–1	2–1	Friendly

== Honours ==
Sheriff Tiraspol

- Moldovan Super Liga: 2022–23
- Moldovan Cup: 2022–23

Copenhagen

- Danish Superliga: 2024–25
- Danish Cup: 2024–25
