= Vinícius Paiva =

Brazilian footballer

Personal information
- Full name: Vinícius dos Santos de Oliveira Paiva
- Date of birth: 1 March 2001 (age 25)
- Place of birth: Rio de Janeiro, Brazil
- Height: 1.70 m (5 ft 7 in)
- Position: Winger

Team information
- Current team: Novorizontino
- Number: 16

Youth career
- 2017–2021: Vasco da Gama

Senior career*
Years	Team	Apps	(Gls)
2020–2024	Vasco da Gama	41	(2)
2022	→ Ituano (loan)	10	(1)
2023–2024	→ Sheriff Tiraspol (loan)	4	(1)
2024	→ Ituano (loan)	39	(6)
2025	Vila Nova	39	(0)
2026–	Novorizontino	32	(1)
- * Club domestic league appearances and goals as of 17 November 2026

Vinícius dos Santos de Oliveira Paiva (born 1 March 2001) is a Brazilian footballer who plays as a winger for Novorizontino.

== Career statistics ==
=== Club ===
As of 7 June 2020.

Club	Season	League			State league		Cup		Continental		Other		Total	
Club	Season	Division	Apps	Goals	Apps	Goals	Apps	Goals	Apps	Goals	Apps	Goals	Apps	Goals
Vasco da Gama	2020	Série A	0	0	8 (Note: Appearances in the Campeonato Carioca)	0	3 (Note: Appearances in the Copa do Brasil)	0	1 (Note: Appearances in the Copa Sudamericana)	0	0	0	12	0
Career total			0	0	8	0	3	0	1	0	0	0	12	0
