= Thierry Nevers =

English footballer

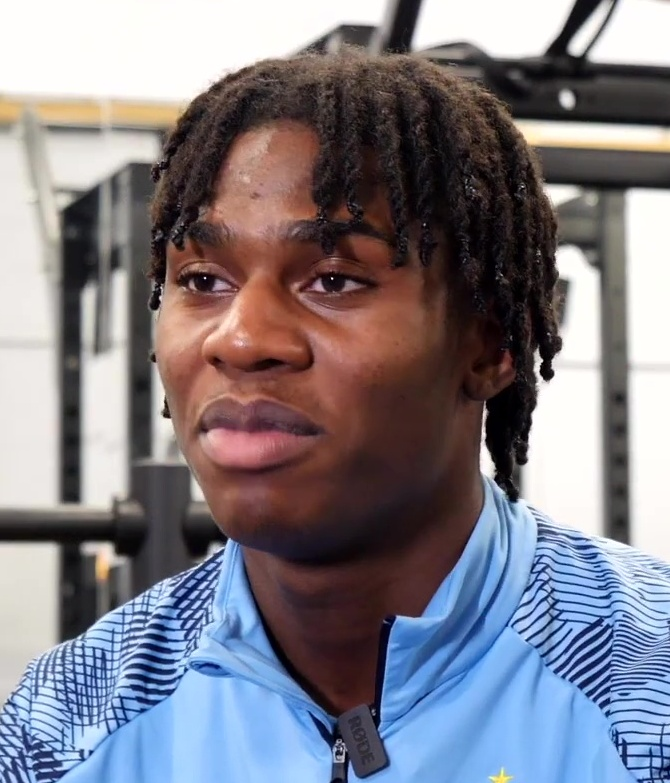

Personal information
- Full name: Thierry Odaine Nevers
- Date of birth: 26 March 2002 (age 24)
- Place of birth: Reading, England
- Position: Winger

Youth career
- 2017–2021: Reading
- 2021–2022: West Ham United

Senior career*
| Years | Team | Apps | (Gls) |
| 2022–2024 | West Ham United | 0 | (0) |
| 2022 | → Newport County (loan) | 12 | (1) |
| 2023 | → Bradford City (loan) | 9 | (0) |
| 2024 | Sheriff Tiraspol | 7 | (0) |
| 2024–2025 | NK Varaždin | 2 | (0) |
- * Club domestic league appearances and goals as of 13:02, 8 December 2025 (UTC)

Thierry Odaine Nevers (born 26 March 2002) is an English professional footballer who last played as a winger for NK Varaždin. He was convicted in 2025 of conspiracy to supply drugs and was sentenced to three years imprisonment.

== Career ==
A product of the Reading academy, Nevers joined West Ham United in May 2021 on a three-year contract with an option for a further year.

On 18 August 2022 Nevers joined Newport County on loan for the duration of the 2022–23 season. Nevers made his debut for Newport on 21 August 2022 in the starting lineup for the 2–1 League Two win against Tranmere Rovers. He scored his first goal for Newport on 27 August 2022 in the 4–0 League Two win against Harrogate Town. He was released back to his parent club by Newport on 29 December 2022.

On 10 January 2023, Nevers signed a loan deal with Bradford City until the end of the season.

On 19 January 2024, West Ham United announced the departure of Nevers on a permanent transfer to Moldovan Super Liga club Sheriff Tiraspol.

On 17 July 2024, Croatian Football League club NK Varaždin announced the signing of Nevers. Following Nevers' sentencing in December 2025, NK Varaždin released a statement stating that Nevers' contract with the club had been terminated on 30 May 2025 after the player had been AWOL since the beginning of the year.

== Personal life ==
In December 2025, after pleading guilty to conspiracy to supply class A drugs, Nevers was sentenced to three years imprisonment following his arrest on 13 August 2025 for drugs offences.

== Career statistics ==
As of match played 23 November 2024

Appearances and goals by club, season and competition
| Club | Season | League | | | Cup (Note: Included the FA Cup and Cupa Moldovei) | | League Cup (Note: Included the EFL Cup) | | Continental | | Other | | Total | |
| Club | Season | Division | Apps | Goals | Apps | Goals | Apps | Goals | Apps | Goals | Apps | Goals | Apps | Goals |
|---|---|---|---|---|---|---|---|---|---|---|---|---|---|---|
| West Ham United | 2021–22 | Premier League | 0 | 0 | 0 | 0 | 0 | 0 | - | | 1 (Note: Appearance(s) in EFL Trophy) | 1 | 1 | 1 |
| West Ham United | 2022–23 | Premier League | 0 | 0 | 0 | 0 | 0 | 0 | - | | 0 | 0 | 0 | 0 |
| West Ham United | Total | | 0 | 0 | 0 | 0 | 0 | 0 | - | - | 1 | 1 | 1 | 1 |
| Newport County (loan) | 2022–23 | League Two | 12 | 1 | 1 | 0 | 1 | 0 | - | | 3 | 0 | 17 | 1 |
| Bradford City (loan) | 2022–23 | League Two | 8 | 0 | 0 | 0 | 0 | 0 | - | | 0 | 0 | 8 | 0 |
| Sheriff Tiraspol | 2023–24 | Super Liga | 7 | 0 | 3 | 1 | - | | 0 (Note: Appearances in the UEFA Champions League and UEFA Europa League) | 0 | – | | 10 | 1 |
| NK Varaždin | 2024–25 | HNL | 2 | 0 | 0 | 0 | - | | - | | – | | 2 | 0 |
| Career total | | | 29 | 1 | 4 | 1 | 1 | 0 | 0 | 0 | 4 | 1 | 38 | 3 |
