= Roman Pylypchuk =

Ukrainian footballer (born 1967)

Roman Pylypchuk Роман Пилипчук
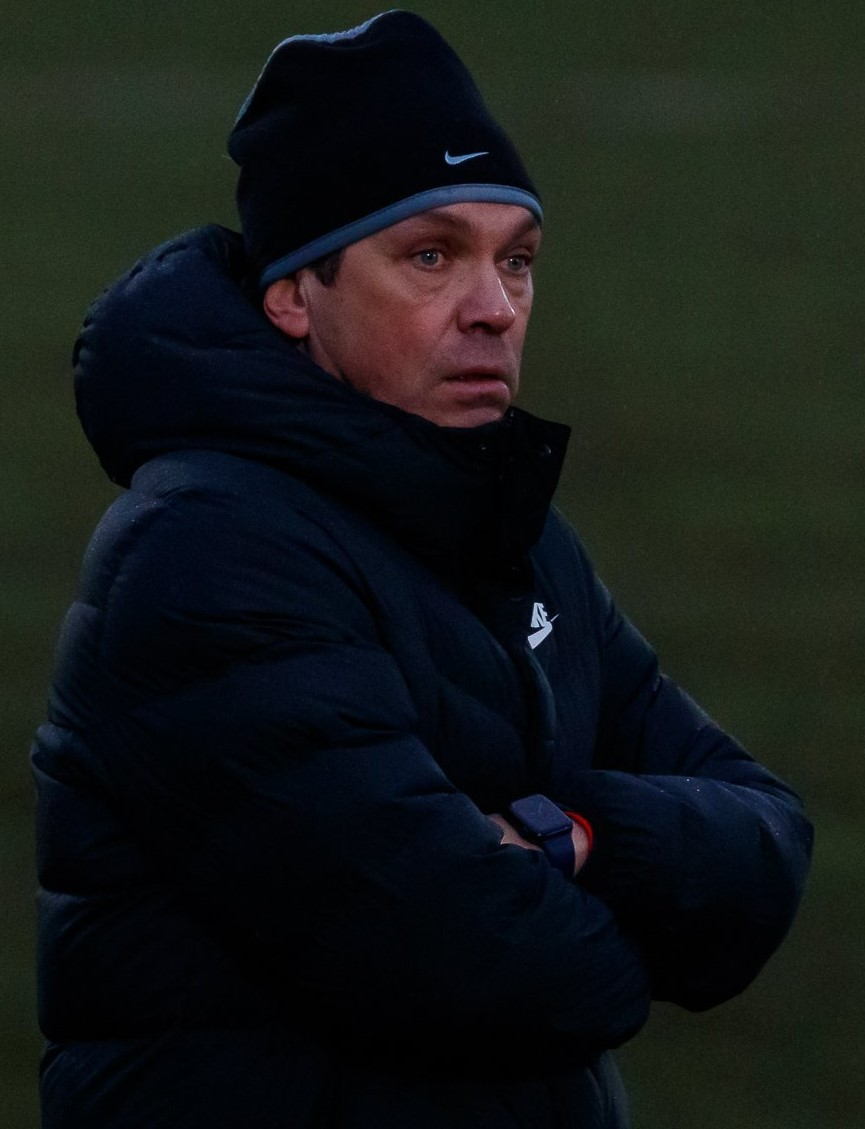
- Pylypchuk coaching Spartak-2 Moscow in 2020

Personal information
- Full name: Roman Mykhaylovych Pylypchuk
- Date of birth: 27 April 1967 (age 59)
- Place of birth: Snizhne, Ukrainian SSR, Soviet Union
- Height: 1.82 m (6 ft 0 in)
- Position: Forward

Youth career
- –1979: Dynamo Kyiv
- 1979–1987: Dynamo Moscow

Senior career*
Years	Team	Apps	(Gls)
1989	Tekstilshchik Ivanovo	39	(15)
1990–1991	Dynamo Moscow	21	(2)
1991	Spartak Vladikavkaz	9	(2)
1991–1993	Maccabi Herzliya	40	(12)
1993–1995	Maccabi Netanya	53	(17)
1995–1997	Maccabi Petah Tikva	71	(24)
1998–1999	Maccabi Herzliya	20	(3)
2000–2003	Metalurh Donetsk	65	(15)
2001–2002	Metalurh-2 Donetsk	6	(3)
Total		324	(93)

Managerial career
- 2003–2004: Metalurh Donetsk (scout)
- 2004–2005: Kryvbas Kryvyi Rih (assistant)
- 2005–2008: Zorya Luhansk (assistant)
- 2008: Shinnik Yaroslavl (assistant)
- 2009: Dacia Chişinău
- 2010: Baltika Kaliningrad (assistant)
- 2011–2012: Dynamo Moscow (assistant)
- 2012–2013: Olimpik Donetsk
- 2014–2015: Spartaks Jūrmala
- 2015–2016: Tajikistan (assistant)
- 2016–2018: Spartak Moscow (assistant)
- 2018–2019: Akhmat Grozny (assistant)
- 2019: Dinamo Minsk
- 2020–2021: Spartak-2 Moscow
- 2021–2022: Olimp-Dolgoprudny
- 2022–2023: Celje
- 2023–2024: Sheriff Tiraspol
- 2024–2026: Chelyabinsk
- * Club domestic league appearances and goals

Roman Mykhaylovych Pylypchuk (Ukrainian: Роман Михайлович Пилипчук; born 27 April 1967) is a Ukrainian professional football manager and former player.

== Playing career ==
As a player, Pylypchuk made his debut in the Soviet Top League in 1990 for Dynamo Moscow.

== Coaching career ==
In the 2024–25 season, Pylypchuk managed Chelyabinsk as they earned promotion to the second-tier Russian First League.
