= David Ankeye =

Nigerian footballer (born 2002)

Personal information
- Full name: David Akpan Ankeye
- Date of birth: 22 May 2002 (age 24)
- Place of birth: Abuja, Nigeria
- Height: 1.91 m (6 ft 3 in)
- Position: Striker

Team information
- Current team: Železničar Pančevo
- Number: 21

Youth career
- -2021: Sidos FC

Senior career*
Years	Team	Apps	(Gls)
2021	Sidos FC	0	(0)
2021	→ Hammarby (loan)	0	(0)
2021	→ Hammarby TFF (loan)	10	(0)
2021–2022	Jimmy Football Academy		
2022–2023	Hammam Sousse	15	(6)
2023	→ Sheriff Tiraspol (loan)	13	(5)
2024	Sheriff Tiraspol	0	(0)
2024–2026	Genoa	10	(0)
2025	→ Rapid București (loan)	8	(0)
2025	→ Virtus Entella (loan)	9	(0)
2026	→ Krasava ENY Ypsonas FC (loan)	12	(1)
2026–	Železničar Pančevo	12	(2)
- * Club domestic league appearances and goals as of 19 October 2026

David Akpan Ankeye (born 22 May 2002) is a Nigerian professional footballer who plays as a striker for Serbian SuperLiga club FK Železničar Pančevo.

== Early life ==
As a youth player, Ankeye joined the youth academy of Nigerian side Sidos FC.

== Career ==
On 6 July 2023, Sheriff Tiraspol of the Moldovan Super Liga announced the signing of Ankeye from ES Hammam Sousse, where he'd spent the previous eight months, scoring five times in eight matches.

On 31 January 2024, Ankeye left Sheriff Tiraspol to sign for Genoa.

On 20 January 2025, Ankeye signed with Rapid București on loan until summer from Genoa.

On 31 August 2025, he was loaned by Virtus Entella in Serie B.

On 26 January 2026, he was loaned by Krasava ENY Ypsonas FC in Cypriot First Division.

On 4 July 2026, Ankeye joined Serbian SuperLiga club FK Železničar Pančevo on a permanent transfer from Genoa CFC, signing a three-year contract.

== Style of play ==
Ankeye mainly operates as a striker and is right-footed.

== Personal life ==
Ankeye is a native of Port Harcourt, Nigeria.
