= Ramon Vinicius =

Brazilian footballer

Personal information
- Full name: Ramon Vinicius dos Santos
- Date of birth: 13 May 2000 (age 26)
- Place of birth: Piracicaba, Brazil
- Height: 1.78 m (5 ft 10 in)
- Position: Midfielder

Team information
- Current team: Ypiranga
- Number: 43

Youth career
- –2019: Ponte Preta
- 2019–2020: Athletico Paranaense

Senior career*
Years	Team	Apps	(Gls)
2020–2021	Athletico Paranaense	6	(0)
2021–2022	Bahia	1	(0)
2022–2024	Água Santa	6	(0)
2023–2024	→ ABC (loan)	30	(1)
2024	Sheriff Tiraspol	7	(0)
2024	Ankara Keçiörengücü	2	(0)
2025	Água Santa	9	(0)
2025	Figueirense	7	(0)
2025	Paysandu	7	(0)
2026–	Ypiranga	24	(0)
- * Club domestic league appearances and goals as of 10 November 2026

Ramon Vinicius dos Santos (born 13 May 2000) is a Brazilian footballer who plays as a midfielder for Ypiranga.

== Career statistics ==
=== Club ===
As of 25 October 2021.

Club	Season	League			State league		Cup		Continental		Other		Total	
Club	Season	Division	Apps	Goals	Apps	Goals	Apps	Goals	Apps	Goals	Apps	Goals	Apps	Goals
Athletico Paranaense	2020	Série A	0	0	4	0	0	0	0	0	0	0	4	0
Athletico Paranaense	2021	Série A	0	0	2	0	0	0	0	0	—		2	0
Athletico Paranaense	Total		0	0	5	0	0	0	0	0	0	0	5	0
Bahia	2021	Série A	0	0	—		—		—		—		0	0
Career total			0	0	6	0	0	0	0	0	0	0	6	0

== Honours ==
Athletico Paranaense

- Campeonato Paranaense: 2020
