= Yoan Severin =

French footballer (born 1997)

Personal information
- Date of birth: 24 January 1997 (age 29)
- Place of birth: Villeurbanne, France
- Height: 1.86 m (6 ft 1 in)
- Position: Centre back

Team information
- Current team: Servette
- Number: 19

Youth career
- 2004–2006: Isle d'Abeau FC
- 2006–2010: Bourgoin-Jallieu
- 2010–2012: Lyon
- 2012–2014: Évian
- 2014–2017: Juventus

Senior career*
Years	Team	Apps	(Gls)
2017–2018	Zulte Waregem	4	(0)
2018–	Servette	179	(6)

International career^{‡}
2016–2017	France U20	5	(1)
- * Club domestic league appearances and goals as of 26 May 2026 ‡ National team caps and goals as of 28 May 2017

Yoan Severin (born 24 January 1997) is a French professional footballer who plays for Servette FC in the Swiss Super League.

== Club career ==
=== Zulte Waregem ===
He made his debut for the Belgian First Division A side on 24 January (his 20th birthday) against Royal Excel Mouscron. He played the whole match in a 1–0 home win.

=== Servette FC ===
On 17 July 2018, Severin moved to Servette in the Swiss Challenge League, signing on a three-year contract. He made his competitive debut for the club on 21 July 2018 in a 2-0 away victory over Aarau. He scored his first competitive goal for the club on 20 October 2018 in a 3-1 home victory against Aarau, similarly to his debut. His goal, scored in the 83rd minute, made the score 2-1 to Servette.

== International career ==
Severin was included in the French squad for the 2017 U20 World Cup. He made only one appearance during the tournament, playing ninety minutes in a 2-0 group stage win over New Zealand.

== Career statistics ==
=== Club ===
(Correct as of 4 March 2017)

Club	Season	League			Cup		League Cup		Europe		Other		Total	
Club	Season	Division	Apps	Goals	Apps	Goals	Apps	Goals	Apps	Goals	Apps	Goals	Apps	Goals
Zulte Waregem	2016–17	Belgian Pro League	4	0	1	0	—		—		—		5	0
Career total			4	0	1	0	0	0	0	0	0	0	5	0

== Honours ==
Zulte Waregem

- Belgian Cup: 2016–17

Servette FC

- Swiss Cup: 2023–24
