= Tyler Reid (footballer) =

English footballer

Personal information
- Full name: Tyler Mark Reid
- Date of birth: 2 September 1997 (age 29)
- Place of birth: Luton, England
- Height: 5 ft 11 in (1.80 m)
- Position: Right back

Youth career
- Arsenal
- 2012–2016: Manchester United
- 2016–2017: Swansea City

Senior career*
Years	Team	Apps	(Gls)
2017–2019	Swansea City	0	(0)
2018	→ Newport County (loan)	7	(0)
2019–2020	Swindon Town	4	(0)
2019–2020	→ Wrexham (loan)	6	(0)
2020–2021	Woking	3	(0)
2021	Jaro	21	(6)
2021	→ JBK	2	(0)
2022–2023	VPS	50	(4)
2024	Sheriff Tiraspol	7	(0)
2025–2026	VPS	20	(1)
- * Club domestic league appearances and goals as of 15 October 2026

Tyler Mark Reid (born 2 September 1997) is an English professional footballer who plays as a right back.

== Career ==
Born in Luton, Reid was a product of the Arsenal youth system, before joining the Manchester United academy in 2012 at the age of 14. Reid signed for Swansea City in July 2016. He moved on loan to Newport County in January 2018.

Reid made his senior debut in a Football League game against Grimsby Town on 13 January 2018. He appeared as a second-half substitute on 13 January 2018 in a 2–1 win.

In June 2019 he moved to Swindon Town.

He signed for Wrexham on loan on 21 November 2019.

On 2 October 2020 Reid left Swindon Town by mutual consent. Later that day he signed for National League club Woking.

On 12 February 2021, Reid joined Finnish second-tier Ykkönen club FF Jaro on a one-year deal. He has also featured for the club's sister club Jakobstads BK (JBK) in third-tier Kakkonen.

On 7 February 2022, Reid signed a two-year contract with Vaasan Palloseura (VPS) in top-tier Veikkausliiga.

In January 2024, Reid moved to Moldova and signed with Sheriff Tiraspol.

In March 2025 he returned to VPS.

== Personal life ==
His brother Jayden is also a footballer, previously with Swansea City's academy but who plays for IFK Mariehamn in Finland.

== Career statistics ==
As of 11 April 2025

Appearances and goals by club, season and competition
Club	Season	League			National Cup		League Cup		Other		Total	
Club	Season	Division	Apps	Goals	Apps	Goals	Apps	Goals	Apps	Goals	Apps	Goals
Swansea City	2017–18	Premier League	0	0	0	0	0	0	0	0	0	0
Swansea City	2018–19	Championship	0	0	0	0	1	0	0	0	1	0
Swansea City	Total		0	0	0	0	1	0	0	0	1	0
Newport County (loan)	2017–18	League Two	7	0	0	0	0	0	—		7	0
Swindon Town	2019–20	League Two	4	0	1	0	0	0	3 (Note: Appearance(s) in the EFL Trophy.)	0	8	0
Wrexham (loan)	2019–20	National League	6	0	0	0	—		1 (Note: Appearance(s) in the FA Trophy.)	0	7	0
Woking	2020–21	National League	3	0	2	0	—		0	0	5	0
Jaro	2021	Ykkönen	21	6	0	0	—		—		21	6
JBK	2021	Kakkonen	2	0	—		—		—		2	0
VPS	2022	Veikkausliiga	26	2	3	1	1	0	—		30	3
VPS	2023	Veikkausliiga	24	2	3	0	3	0	—		30	2
VPS	Total		50	4	6	1	4	0	0	0	60	5
Sheriff Tiraspol	2023–24	Moldovan Super Liga	7	0	1	0	—		0	0	8	0
Sheriff Tiraspol	2024–25	Moldovan Super Liga	0	0	0	0	–		0	0	0	0
Sheriff Tiraspol	Total		7	0	1	0	0	0	0	0	8	0
VPS	2025	Veikkausliiga	2	1	0	0	0	0	–		2	1
Career total			102	11	§0	1	5	0	4	0	121	12

== Honours ==
Swansea City U23

- Premier League Cup: 2016–17
