= List of association football players known by a mononym =

Many association football players are known by a mononym. This is particularly popular in Brazil. Players with mononyms include:

- Adilson (Portuguese footballer), winger Nélson Alexandre Vieira Semedo (born 1987)
- Armandinho (footballer), Brazilian striker Armando dos Santos Silva (1911–1972)
- Chay (footballer), Brazilian attacking midfielder Chayene Medeiros Oliveira Santos (born 1990)
- Edinho (disambiguation)
- Elizeu (disambiguation)
- Erivelto (disambiguation)
- Erivelton (disambiguation)
- Edinho (disambiguation)
- Escurinho (footballer, born 1930) (1930–2020), Brazilian attacking midfielder Benedito Custódio Ferreira
- Escurinho (footballer, born 1950) (1950–2011), Brazilian striker Luís Carlos Machado
- Evaldo (disambiguation)
- Evanílson (footballer, born 1975), Brazilian former right-back and midfielder Evanílson Aparecido Ferreira
- Evanilson (footballer, born 1999), Brazilian striker Francisco Evanilson de Lima Barbosa
- Fabinho (disambiguation)
- Fantick (footballer, born 1955) (1955–2024), Brazilian left-back Francisco de Assis dos Santos
- Fantick (footballer, born 1977), Brazilian forward Márcio Delvi da Costa
- Flamarion (footballer, born 1951), Brazilian manager and former midfielder Flamarion Nunes Tomazolli (1951–2020)
- Flamarion (footballer, born 1996), Brazilian forward Flamarion Jovinho Filho
- Gabri (footballer, born 1979), Spanish midfielder and manager Gabriel Francisco García de la Torre
- Gabri (footballer, born 1985), Spanish forward Gabriel Gómez Román
- Geovane (disambiguation)
- Geraldo (disambiguation)
- Giva (footballer, born 1999), Brazilian midfielder Geovane Silva Santos (born 1999)
- Gláucio (footballer, born 1975), Brazilian striker Gláucio de Jesus Carvalho
- Gláucio (footballer, born 1994), Brazilian forward Gláucio Jose de Araujo Silva
- Guga (disambiguation)
- Guima (footballer, born 1986), Portuguese striker Bruno Guimarães Pinho de Azevedo
- Guima (footballer, born 1995), Mozambican midfielder Ricardo Martins Guimarães
- Hélcio (footballer, born 1903) (1903–?), Brazilian footballer Hélcio de Paiva
- Hélcio (footballer, born 1969), Brazilian defensive midfielder Hélcio Roberto Alisk
- Indio (disambiguation)
- Joãozinho (disambiguation)
- Joel (footballer, born 1904), Brazilian football goalkeeper Joel de Oliveira Monteiro (1904–1990)
- Joel (footballer, born 1980), Brazilian football centre-back Joel Bertoti Padilha
- Juanín (disambiguation)
- Juanlu (disambiguation)
- Juanpe (disambiguation)
- Juanra (footballer, born 1980), Spanish football right-back Juan Ramón Cabrero Obrer
- Juanra (footballer, born 1995), Spanish football right-back Juan Ramón Gómez-Pimpollo López
- Juárez (footballer), Brazilian former footballer Juárez de Souza Teixeira (born 1973)
- Kadu (disambiguation)
- Kaka (disambiguation)
- Koke (disambiguation)
- Kuki (footballer, born 1971), Brazilian head coach and former forward Sílvio Luiz Borba da Silva
- Kuki (footballer, born 1994), Spanish forward Míriam Rodríguez González
- Laércio Gomes Costa (born 1990), also known as Laércio Carreirinha or simply Laércio, Brazilian striker
- Laércio (footballer, born 1998), Brazilian midfielder Laércio da Silva Carvalho
- Lamá (footballer, born 1981), Angolan goalkeeper Luís Maimona João
- Lamá (footballer, born 1985), Mozambican goalkeeper Odimba Otshudi Lamá
- Lucao (disambiguation)
- Luisão, Brazilian former centre-back Ânderson Luís da Silva (born 1981)
- Luisinho (disambiguation)
- Luisma (footballer, born 1989), Spanish former midfielder Luis Manuel Villa López (born 1989)
- Luismi (disambiguation)
- Luizão (disambiguation)
- Naldinho (footballer, born 1990), Brazilian midfielder Erivonaldo Florencio de Oliveira Filho
- Naldinho (footballer, born 1992), Brazilian forward Leonardo Benedito da Silva
- Naldo (disambiguation)
- Nandinho (disambiguation)
- Nano (disambiguation)
- Nêgo (footballer), Brazilian right-back Lindenbergh Francisco da Silva (born 1985)
- Neguete (disambiguation)
- Neguitão (footballer), Brazilian former right-back Carlos Roberto Camargo (born 1975)
- Nena (footballer, born 1923), Brazilian football defender Olavo Rodrigues Barbosa (1923–2010)
- Nena (footballer, born 1981), Brazilian-born Equatoguinean football forward Ygor da Silva
- Neymar, Brazilian attacking midfielder and forward Neymar da Silva Santos Júnior (born 1992)
- Nonato (disambiguation)
- Pablo (footballer), various players
- Pedri, Spanish midfielder Pedro González López (born 2002)
- Pedro (disambiguation)
- Pelé, Brazilian forward Edson Arantes do Nascimento (1940–2022)
- Pepelu, Spanish central midfielder José Luis García Vayá (born 1998)
- Raphinha, Brazilian winger and forward Raphael Dias Belloli (born 1996)
- Recio (footballer), Spanish central midfielder José Luis García del Pozo (born 1991)
- Rodri (disambiguation)
- Ronaldinho, Brazilian attacking midfielder and left winger Ronaldo de Assis Moreira (born 1980)
- Ronaldo (Brazilian footballer), Brazilian former striker Ronaldo Luís Nazário de Lima (born 1976)
- Rubinho (footballer), Brazilian former goalkeeper Rubens Fernando Moedim (born 1982)
- Sebá, Brazilian winger Sebastião de Freitas Couto Júnior (born 1992)
- Serginho (disambiguation)
- Sócrates, Brazilian midfielder Sócrates Brasileiro Sampaio de Souza Vieira de Oliveira (1954–2011)
- Somália (disambiguation)
- Suso (footballer), Spanish former attacking midfielder and right winger Jesús Joaquín Fernández Sáenz de la Torre (born 1993)
- Suso Santana, also known as Suso, Spanish former right winger Jesús Manuel Santana Abreu (born 1985)
- Talison (footballer), Brazilian right-back Talison Ruan da Silva (born 2000)
- Talles (footballer), Brazilian midfielder Talles Brener de Paula (born 1998)
- Talles Costa, known as Talles, Brazilian mdifielder Talles Macedo Toledo Costa (born 2002)
- Tonho (disambiguation)
- Tostão, Brazilian former forward and attacking midfielder Eduardo Gonçalves de Andrade (born 1947)
- Tuca (footballer), Brazilian defender Juliano Francisco de Paula (born 1981)
- Vaguinho (disambiguation)
- Valtinho (footballer, born 1948), Brazilian defender Valter Alves da Silva
- Valtinho (footballer, born 1956), Brazilian attacking midfielder Valter Lucca Lateri
- Vandinho (disambiguation)
- Xandão (footballer, born 1988), Brazilian defender Alexandre Luiz Reame
- Xandão (footballer, born 1990), Brazilian defender Alexandre Rodrigues Soares
- Xano (footballer), Portuguese striker Idálio Alexandre Ferreira Espírito Santo (born 1983)
- Xavi (footballer, born 1980), Spanish manager and former midfielder Xavi Hernández
- Xavi (Portuguese footballer), defender Cristiano Xavier Gonçalves Carvalho (born 1983)
- Xavier (footballer, born January 1980), Brazilian midfielder Anderson Conceição Xavier
- Xavier (footballer, born 2000), Brazilian midfielder João Vitor Xavier de Almeida
- Ygor (footballer, born 1984), Brazilian football midfielder Ygor Maciel Santiago
- Ygor (footballer, born 1986), Brazilian football striker Ygor Tadeu de Souza
- Yuri (disambiguation)
- Zeca (disambiguation)
- Zeze (disambiguation)
- Zico (footballer) (born 1953), Brazilian coach and former attacking midfielder Arthur Antunes Coimbra
- Zico (footballer, born 1966), Brazilian coach and former forward Milton Antonio Nunes Niemet

== See also ==
- Juanra (futsal player) (born 1982), Spanish midfielder Juan Ramón Calvo Rodríguez
- Kaká (futsal player) (born 1987), Italian pivot Carlos Augusto dos Santos da Silva
- Nandinho (futsal player), Portuguese player Fernando Manuel Silva Leal (born 1982)
- Neguinho (futsal player, born 1992), Brazilian winger Edison Machado Coelho
- Neguinho (futsal player, born 2000), Brazilian defender João Victor Alves Sena
- Nenê (futsal player), Brazilian pivot João Carlos Gonçalves Filho (born 1983)
- Vandinho (futsal player), Brazilian winger Evandro Borges (born 1998)
