= Fabio =

Fabio [ˈfaːbjo] is a given name descended from Latin Fabius and very popular in Italy and Latin America (due to Italian migration).

The name is written without an accent in Italian and Spanish, but is usually accented in Portuguese as Fábio (with the diminutive Fabinho and the variant Fabiano in Portuguese and Fabián in Spanish [English equivalent is Fabian]). The presence or absence of the written accent does not affect pronunciation.

== First name ==
=== A–K ===
- Fabio (DJ), drum-and-bass DJ and producer from the UK
- Fábio Alves (born 1988), Brazilian professional footballer
- Fábio Alves Félix (born 1980), Brazilian football manager and former player
- Fábio Arlindo de Medeiros (1939–2020), Brazilian football goalkeeper
- Fabio Armiliato (born 1956), Italian operatic tenor
- Fábio Aurélio (born 1979), Brazilian footballer
- Fábio Bahia (Fábio Júnior Nascimento Santana, born 1983), playing for Goiás
- Fabio Bencivenga, Italian water polo player
- Fábio Bilica (born 1979), Brazilian former professional footballer
- Jud "Fabio" Birza, winner of Survivor: Nicaragua
- Fabio Borini, Italian footballer
- Fábio Camilo de Brito (Nenê, born 1975), playing for Coritiba Foot Ball Club
- Fabio Cannavaro, former captain of the Italy national team
- Fabio Capello, Italian manager of the Russian national association football team
- Fábio Costa (born 1977), Brazilian footballer
- Fábio Eduardo Cribari (born 1975), Brazilian footballer, better known as Binho
- Fabio Cudicini (1935–2025), Italian footballer
- Fábio Felix (born 1985), Brazilian politician
- Fabio Fognini (born 1987), Italian tennis player
- Fábio Gonçalves dos Santos (born 1978), Brazilian footballer
- Fábio Pereira da Cruz (born 1979), Brazilian footballer
- Fabio Díez (born 1965), Argentinian-Spanish beach volleyball player
- Fabio Duarte, Colombian track and road cyclist
- Fabio Frizzi (born 1951), Italian film composer
- Fabio De Gaspari (born 1966), Italian javelin thrower
- Fabio Di Giannantonio (born 1998), Italian Grand Prix motorcycle racer
- Fábio Gilvan do Nascimento Silva (born 1983), Brazilian footballer
- Fabio Grosso, Italian footballer
- Fabio Gstrein (born 1997), Austrian alpine skier
- Fábio Henrique Tavares (born 1993), Brazilian footballer, playing for Al Hilal
- Fabio Jaramillo, Colombian cyclist
- Fábio Jr., a Brazilian singer and musician
- Fábio Kolling (born 1985), Brazilian footballer

=== L–Z ===
- Fábio Lago, Brazilian actor
- Fabio Lanzoni, Italian model/actor, generally known as simply Fabio
- Fábio Lefundes, Brazilian football manager
- Fabio Lione, Italian vocalist of Rhapsody of Fire
- Fábio Deivson Lopes Maciel (born 1980), Brazilian footballer, playing for Fluminense, the footballer with the most appearances professionally of all time
- Fabio Lopez (born 1973), Italian football manager
- Fábio Luciano (born 1975), Brazilian footballer
- Fábio Luiz Magalhães, Brazilian beach volleyball player
- Fábio Freire Martins (born 1989), Brazilian footballer
- Fabio Morábito (born 1955), Mexican poet
- Fabio Mussi (born 1948), Italian politician
- Fabio Ochoa Restrepo, Colombian businessman and patriarch of the Ochoa drug-trafficking family
- Fabio Ochoa Vásquez, Colombian drug lord
- Fabio Ongaro, Italian rugby player
- Fábio Pereira da Silva (born 1990), Brazilian footballer, twin brother of Rafael
- Fabio Petruzzi (born 1970), Italian footballer
- Fabio Pignatelli, bassist for the Italian progressive rock band Goblin
- Fabio Porta (born 1963), Italian politician
- Fabio Quagliarella, Italian footballer
- Fabio Quartararo, French Grand Prix motorcycle racer
- Fabio Rakotoarimanana (born 2003), Malagasy table tennis player
- Fabio Ribotta (born 1998), Italian curler
- Fabio Rovazzi (born 1994), Italian rapper and actor
- Fábio José dos Santos (born 1973), Brazilian footballer
- Fabio Scuto (1957–2026), Italian journalist
- Fabio Semenzato, Italian rugby player
- José Fábio da Silva (born 1984), Brazilian football right-back
- Fábio de Souza (Fabinho), Brazilian footballer
- Fábio Souza de Oliveira (born 1984), Brazilian footballer
- Fábio Teruel (born 1971), Brazilian politician
- Fabio Testi (born 1941), Italian actor
- Fabio Viviani (chef), placed fourth and earned the title of "fan favorite" in season 5 of Bravo reality show competition Top Chef
- Fabio Viviani (footballer) (born 1966), Italian footballer

== Last name ==
- João Paulo di Fabio (born 1979), Italian-Brazilian football defender
- José Fabio (born 1977), Paraguayan basketball player

== See also ==
- List of storms named Fabio
- Fabinho (disambiguation)
- Fábio Júnior (disambiguation)
- Fábio Lopes (disambiguation)
- Fabio Santos (disambiguation)
- Fábio Silva (disambiguation)
- Fabius (disambiguation)
