= Fabius (disambiguation) =

Fabius was the son of Hercules and an unnamed mother in Roman mythology.

Fabius may also refer to:

== People ==
- Saint Fabius (died 303 or 304), Roman Catholic saint
- Quintus Fabius Maximus Verrucosus, surnamed Cunctator (c. 280 – 203 BC), Roman statesman and general
- Fabius Constable (born 1973), Italian celtic harp player
- Fabius Maximus Stanly (1815–1882), US Navy rear admiral
- François Fabius (1944–2006), French antiquarian and equestrian
- Laurent Fabius (born 1946), French politician
- Fabia gens, an ancient Roman family with many members named Fabius

== Places in the United States ==
- Fabius, Missouri, an unincorporated community
- Fabius (town), New York
  - Fabius (village), New York, within the town
- Fabius, West Virginia, an unincorporated community
- Fabius Township (disambiguation)
- Fabius River, Missouri

== Other uses ==
- Fabius (horse), a Thoroughbred racehorse
- Exercise Fabius, a 1944 rehearsal for the World War II Normandy landings

== See also ==
- Fabia gens
- Fabian (disambiguation)
- Fabio
