= 2022 Clube Náutico Capibaribe season =

Náutico
2022 season
- Chairman: Diógenes Braga
- Manager: Hélio dos Anjos; Dudu Capixaba (c); Felipe Conceição; Roberto Fernandes; Elano Blumer; Dado Cavalcanti
- Stadium: Estádio dos Aflitos
- Série B: 20th
- Pernambucano: Champions (24th title)
- Copa do Brasil: First round
- Copa do Nordeste: Semi-final
- Top goalscorer: League: Geuvânio (4); All: Jean Carlos (8)
Home colors	Away colors	Third colors

The 2022 season was Náutico's 122nd season in the club's history. Náutico competed in the Campeonato Pernambucano, Copa do Nordeste, Série B and Copa do Brasil.

== Squad ==
Note: Flags indicate national team as defined under FIFA eligibility rules; some limited exceptions apply. Players may hold more than one non-FIFA nationality.

No.	Pos.	Nation	Player
12	GK	BRA	Bruno Lopes
26	GK	BRA	Renan
—	GK	BRA	Vagner
—	DF	BRA	Camutanga
21	DF	BRA	Carlão
13	DF	BRA	João Paulo
3	DF	BRA	Wellington
—	DF	BRA	Bryan
4	DF	BRA	Hereda
2	DF	BRA	Victor Ferraz
19	DF	BRA	Luan
6	DF	BRA	Thassio
5	MF	BRA	Djavan
—	MF	BRA	Kaycky
15	MF	BRA	Luís Felipe
8	MF	BRA	Ralph

No.	Pos.	Nation	Player
18	MF	PAR	Richard Franco
17	MF	BRA	Eduardo Teixeira
—	MF	BRA	Felipe Cabeleira
—	MF	BRA	Fernando Neto
20	MF	BRA	Juninho Carpina
16	MF	BRA	Lucas Paraíba
19	FW	BRA	Amarildo
7	FW	BRA	Ewandro
—	FW	BRA	Jonathas
22	FW	BRA	Júlio
—	FW	BRA	Kauã Maranhão
9	FW	BRA	Léo Passos
—	FW	BRA	Niltinho
—	FW	BRA	Luis Phelipe
11	FW	BRA	Pedro Vitor
16	FW	BRA	Robinho

== Statistics ==
=== Overall ===
Games played	61 (12 Pernambucano, 10 Copa do Nordeste, 1 Copa do Brasil, 38 Série B)
Games won	18 (6 Pernambucano, 4 Copa do Nordeste, 0 Copa do Brasil, 8 Série B)
Games drawn	12 (3 Pernambucano, 3 Copa do Nordeste, 0 Copa do Brasil, 6 Série B)
Games lost	31 (3 Pernambucano, 3 Copa do Nordeste, 1 Copa do Brasil, 24 Série B)
Goals scored	63
Goals conceded	86
Goal difference	–23
Best results (goal difference)	3–0 (H) v Íbis - Pernambucano - 2022.01.22; 3–0 (A) v Sete de Setembro - Pernambucano - 2022.02.01; 3–0 (H) v Atlético de Alagoinhas - Copa do Nordeste - 2022.02.15; 3–0 (H) v Sergipe - Copa do Nordeste - 2022.03.06
Worst result (goal difference)	0–6 (A) v Novorizontino - Série B - 2022.10.14
Top scorer	Jean Carlos (8)

Source: Náutico official website

=== Goalscorers ===
Place	Position	Nationality	Number	Name	Campeonato Pernambucano	Copa do Nordeste	Copa do Brasil	Série B	Total
1	MF	(Brazil)	10	Jean Carlos	2	3	0	3	8
2	FW	(Brazil)	20	Juninho Carpina	4	1	0	0	5
2	FW	(Brazil)	16	Robinho	1	4	0	0	5
3	FW	(Brazil)	23	Geuvânio	0	0	0	4	4
3	MF	(Brazil)	11	Pedro Vitor	1	1	0	2	4
3	MF	(Paraguay)	18	Richard Franco	1	0	0	3	4
4	FW	(Brazil)	15	Éverton	0	0	0	3	3
4	MF	(Brazil)	17	Ewandro	3	0	0	0	3
4	FW	(Brazil)	22	Júlio	2	0	0	1	3
5	FW	(Brazil)	19	Amarildo	0	0	0	2	2
5	DF	(Brazil)	6	Júnior Tavares	1	1	0	0	2
5	FW	(Brazil)	9	Léo Passos	1	1	0	0	2
5	DF	(Brazil)	2	Victor Ferraz	0	0	0	2	2
6	DF	(Brazil)	6	Ailton	0	0	0	1	1
6	DF	(Brazil)	3	Bruno Bispo	0	0	0	1	1
6	MF	(Brazil)	22	Eduardo Teixeira	0	1	0	0	1
6	MF	(Brazil)	7	Jobson	0	0	0	1	1
6	MF	(Brazil)	15	Kauã Maranhão	0	1	0	0	1
6	FW	(Brazil)	9	Kieza	0	0	0	1	1
6	FW	(Brazil)	23	Leandro Carvalho	0	1	0	0	1
6	MF	(Brazil)	11	Luis Phelipe	0	0	0	1	1
6	DF	(Brazil)	33	Maurício	0	0	0	1	1
6	MF	(Brazil)	7	Niltinho	0	0	0	1	1
6	MF	(Brazil)	8	Souza	0	0	0	1	1
6	MF	(Brazil)	8	Rhaldney	0	1	0	0	1
6	DF	(Brazil)	6	Thassio Melo	0	0	0	1	1
6	DF	(Brazil)	13	Wellington	0	0	0	1	1
				Own goals	0	0	0	2	2
				Total	16	15	0	32	63

=== Managers performance ===
Name	Nationality	From	To	P	W	D	L	GF	GA	Avg%	Ref
Hélio dos Anjos	Brazil	22 January 2022	5 February 2022	6	3	1	2	10	5	55%	
Dudu Capixaba (c)	Brazil	12 February 2022	20 July 2022	5	1	1	3	6	7	26%	
Felipe Conceição	Brazil	17 February 2022	10 April 2022	13	5	4	4	14	12	48%	
Roberto Fernandes	Brazil	21 April 2022	17 July 2022	18	5	6	7	18	21	38%	
Elano Blumer	Brazil	23 July 2022	19 August 2022	6	1	0	5	4	10	16%	
Dado Cavalcanti	Brazil	26 August 2022	4 November 2022	13	3	0	10	11	31	23%	

(c) Indicates the caretaker manager

== Official competitions ==
=== Campeonato Pernambucano ===
22 January 2022 1	Náutico	3–0	Íbis	Recife
16:30 (UTC-3)	Juninho Carpina 12', 17'; Júlio 89'	Report		Stadium: Estádio Eládio de Barros Carvalho (Aflitos); Referee: Deborah Cecilia Cruz Correia

1 February 2022 2	Sete de Setembro	0–3	Náutico	São Lourenço da Mata
19:00 (UTC-3)		Report	Júnior Tavares 29'; Juninho Carpina 45+2'; Ewandro 53' (pen.)	Stadium: Estádio Governador Carlos Wilson Campos (Arena Pernambuco); Referee: Michelangelo Martins de Almeida Júnior

9 February 2022 3	Náutico	1–2	Retrô	Recife
21:30 (UTC-3)	Ewandro 89'	Report	Giva 52'; Renato Henrique 90+6'	Stadium: Estádio Eládio de Barros Carvalho (Aflitos); Referee: Diego Fernando Silva de Lima

17 February 2022 4	Vera Cruz	1–2	Náutico	Caruaru
19:00 (UTC-3)	Jailton 52'	Report	Juninho Carpina 12'; Júlio 49'	Stadium: Estádio Antônio Inácio de Souza; Referee: Tiago Nascimento dos Santos

27 February 2022 6	Afogados da Ingazeira	2–2	Náutico	Afogados da Ingazeira
19:00 (UTC-3)	Anderson Chaves 63'; Victor Juffo 90+5'	Report	Jean Carlos 15' (pen.); Ewandro 56'	Stadium: Estádio Valdemar Viana de Araújo; Referee: Hugo Soares Dias Figueiredo

2 March 2022 5	Náutico	1–0	Salgueiro	Recife
19:00 (UTC-3)	Robinho 6'	Report		Stadium: Estádio Eládio de Barros Carvalho (Aflitos); Referee: Gilberto Rodrigues Castro Junior

9 March 2022 7	Náutico	1–0	Caruaru City	Recife
21:30 (UTC-3)	Richard Franco 90+2'	Report		Stadium: Estádio Eládio de Barros Carvalho (Aflitos); Referee: Deborah Cecilia Cruz Correia

12 March 2022 5	Náutico	1–2	Sport	Recife
16:30 (UTC-3)	Jean Carlos 45+5'	Report	Parraguez 79'; Ewerthon 90+6'	Stadium: Estádio Eládio de Barros Carvalho (Aflitos); Attendance: 1,659; Referee: Diego Fernando Silva de Lima

16 March 2022 9	Santa Cruz	1–1	Náutico	Recife
21:00 (UTC-3)	Matheus Anderson 47' (pen.)	Report	Léo Passos 63'	Stadium: Estádio José do Rego Maciel (Arruda); Referee: Rodrigo Pereira

==== Semi-final ====
2 April 2022	Náutico	0–0 (4–3 p)	Santa Cruz	Recife
16:30 (UTC-3)		Report		Stadium: Estádio Eládio de Barros Carvalho (Aflitos); Attendance: 10,006; Referee: Deborah Cecília Cruz Correia
	Penalties
	Jean Carlos (penalty missed); Diogo Hereda (penalty scored); Diego Victor (penalty scored); Amarildo (penalty scored); Júnior Tavares (penalty scored)		(penalty scored) Esquerdinha; (penalty missed) Alex Alves; (penalty scored) Rodrigo Yuri; (penalty scored) Marcos Martins; (penalty missed) Edson Ratinho

==== Finals ====
21 April 2022	Náutico	0–1	Retrô	Recife
16:30 (UTC-3)		Report	Guilherme Paraíba 68'	Stadium: Estádio Eládio de Barros Carvalho (Aflitos); Attendance: 14,497; Referee: Diego Fernando Silva de Lima

30 April 2022	Retrô	0–1 (2–4 p)	Náutico	São Lourenço da Mata
16:40 (UTC-3)		Report	Pedro Vitor 45+7'	Stadium: Estádio Governador Carlos Wilson Campos (Arena Pernambuco); Attendance: 18,613; Referee: Deborah Cecilia Cruz Correia
	Penalties
	Charles (penalty missed); Pedro Costa (penalty missed); Augusto Potiguar (penalty scored); Guilherme Paraíba (penalty scored)		(penalty scored) Diogo Hereda; (penalty scored) Richard Franco; (penalty missed) Camutanga; (penalty scored) Ewandro; (penalty scored) Júnior Tavares

==== Record ====
Final Position	Points	Matches	Wins	Draws	Losses	Goals For	Goals Away	Win%
1st	21	12	6	3	3	16	9	58%

=== Copa do Nordeste ===
25 January 2022 1	Náutico	0–0	Campinense	Recife
20:00 (UTC-3)		Report		Stadium: Estádio Eládio de Barros Carvalho (Aflitos); Attendance: 1,102; Referee: Luciano da Silva Miranda Filho

29 January 2022 2	Sport	3–2	Náutico	Recife
17:45 (UTC-3)	Mikael 45+1', 74', 87'	Report	Robinho 28'; Kauã 78'	Stadium: Estádio Adelmar da Costa Carvalho (Ilha do Retiro); Attendance: 2,381; Referee: Dênis da Silva Ribeiro Serafim

5 February 2022 3	Sampaio Corrêa	0–1	Náutico	São Luís
20:00 (UTC-3)		Report	Rhaldney 31'	Stadium: Estádio Governador João Castelo (Castelão); Attendance: 1,472; Referee: Adriano Barros Carneiro

12 February 2022 4	Náutico	2–2	Fortaleza	Recife
17:45 (UTC-3)	Jean Carlos 4'; Eduardo Teixeira 64'	Report	Yago Pikachu 10', 57'	Stadium: Estádio Eládio de Barros Carvalho (Aflitos); Attendance: 130; Referee: Antonio Dib Moraes de Sousa

15 February 2022 5	Náutico	3–0	Atlético de Alagoinhas	Recife
21:30 (UTC-3)	Jean Carlos 14'; Leandro Carvalho 48'; Robinho 50'	Report		Stadium: Estádio Eládio de Barros Carvalho (Aflitos); Attendance: 125; Referee: Leonilson Fernandes Trigueiro Filho

20 February 2022 6	CSA	3–1	Náutico	Maceió
16:00 (UTC-3)	Marcel 5'; Giva 7'; Geovane 18'	Report	Juninho Carpina 80'	Stadium: Estádio Rei Pelé; Attendance: 3,814; Referee: Pablo Ramon Gonçalves Pinheiro

6 March 2022 7	Náutico	3–0	Sergipe	Recife
18:30 (UTC-3)	Robinho 45'; Jean Carlos 56'; Pedro Vitor 90+4'	Report		Stadium: Estádio Eládio de Barros Carvalho (Aflitos); Attendance: 177; Referee: Tiago Ramos de Oliveira

19 March 2022 8	Globo	0–2	Náutico	Ceará-Mirim
17:45 (UTC-3)		Report	Léo Passos 31'; Robinho 39'	Stadium: Estádio Manoel Dantas Barretto; Attendance: 352; Referee: Adriano Barros Carneiro

==== Quarter-final ====
23 March 2022	Botafogo–PB	1–1 (3–4 p)	Náutico	Recife
20:00 (UTC-3)	Leilson 71'	Report	Júnior Tavares 88'	Stadium: Estádio José Américo de Almeida Filho (Almeidão); Attendance: 6,206; Referee: Marcelo de Lima Henrique
	Penalties
	Gustavo Coutinho (penalty scored); Leilson (penalty scored); Ratinho (penalty missed); Adilson Bahia (penalty scored); Bruno Ré (penalty missed)		(penalty scored) Pedro Vitor; (penalty scored) Diogo Hereda; (penalty scored) Amarildo; (penalty missed) Juninho Carpina; (penalty scored) Júnior Tavares

==== Semi-final ====
26 March 2022	Fortaleza	2–0	Náutico	Fortaleza
17:45 (UTC-3)	Robson 19'; Romero 88'	Report		Stadium: Estádio Governador Plácido Castelo (Castelão); Attendance: 31,681; Referee: Denis da Silva Ribeiro Serafim

==== Record ====
Final Position	Points	Matches	Wins	Draws	Losses	Goals For	Goals Away	Win%
4th	15	10	4	3	3	15	11	50%

=== Copa do Brasil ===
23 February 2022	Tocantinópolis	1–0	Náutico	Tocantinópolis
20:30 (UTC-3)	Raí 17'	Report		Stadium: Estádio João Ribeiro; Attendance: 1,733; Referee: Dewson Fernando Freitas da Silva

==== Record ====
Final Position	Points	Matches	Wins	Draws	Losses	Goals For	Goals Away	Win%
75th	0	1	0	0	1	0	1	0%

=== Série B ===
==== Table ====
Pos	Team	Pld	W	D	L	GF	GA	GD	Pts	Promotion or relegation
16	Novorizontino	38	11	11	16	44	49	−5	44	
17	CSA (R)	38	9	15	14	29	37	−8	42	Relegation to 2023 Campeonato Brasileiro Série C
18	Brusque (R)	38	8	10	20	21	38	−17	34	Relegation to 2023 Campeonato Brasileiro Série C
19	Operário Ferroviário (R)	38	7	13	18	31	53	−22	34	Relegation to 2023 Campeonato Brasileiro Série C
20	Náutico (R)	38	8	6	24	32	65	−33	30	Relegation to 2023 Campeonato Brasileiro Série C

Source: CBF
Rules for classification: 1) points; 2) wins; 3) goal difference; 4) goals scored; 5) head-to-head results (only between 2 teams); 6) fewest red cards; 7) fewest yellow cards; 8) drawing of lots.
(R) Relegated

==== First stage ====
10 April 2022 1	Londrina	2–0	Náutico	Londrina
11:00 (UTC-3)	Jhonny Lucas 34'; Negueba 39'	Report		Stadium: Estádio Jacy Scaff (do Café); Attendance: 1,159; Referee: Paulo Cesar Zanovelli da Silva

15 April 2022 2	Náutico	0–1	Bahia	Recife
21:30 (UTC-3)		Report	Douglas Borel 12'	Stadium: Estádio Eládio de Barros Carvalho (Aflitos); Attendance: 3,434; Referee: Rodrigo Batista Raposo

24 April 2022 3	Náutico	2–0	Operário	Recife
16:00 (UTC-3)	Niltinho 33'; Luis Phelipe 78'	Report		Stadium: Estádio Eládio de Barros Carvalho (Aflitos); Attendance: 2,844; Referee: Dewson Fernando Freitas da Silva

27 April 2022 4	CRB	1–2	Náutico	Maceió
19:00 (UTC-3)	Richard 57'	Report	Pedro Vitor 78'; Ailton 88'	Stadium: Estádio Rei Pelé; Attendance: 3,674; Referee: Zandick Gondim Alves Junior

3 May 2022 5	Náutico	1–1	Guarani	Recife
21:30 (UTC-3)	Amarildo 90+4'	Report	Bruno José 20'	Stadium: Estádio Eládio de Barros Carvalho (Aflitos); Attendance: 4,294; Referee: Caio Max Augusto Vieira

6 May 2022 6	Vila Nova	2–0	Náutico	Goiânia
19:00 (UTC-3)	Daniel Amorim 22'; Pablo Dyego 27'	Report		Stadium: Estádio Onésio Brasileiro Alvarenga; Attendance: 4,891; Referee: Paulo Roberto Alves Junior

15 May 2022 7	Náutico	0–1	Cruzeiro	Recife
16:00 (UTC-3)		Report	Willian Oliveira 39'	Stadium: Estádio Eládio de Barros Carvalho (Aflitos); Attendance: 6,542; Referee: Leandro Vuaden

19 May 2022 8	Náutico	1–1	CSA	Recife
21:30 (UTC-3)	Victor Ferraz 85'	Report	Giva 24'	Stadium: Estádio Eládio de Barros Carvalho (Aflitos); Attendance: 4,141; Referee: Edina Alves Batista

26 May 2022 9	Ituano	0–0	Náutico	Itu
21:30 (UTC-3)		Report		Stadium: Estádio Municipal Dr. Novelli Júnior; Attendance: 1,245; Referee: Paulo Henrique Schleich Vollkopf

4 June 2022 10	Brusque	1–2	Náutico	Brusque
19:00 (UTC-3)	Diego Jardel 37'	Report	Wallace 58' (o.g.); Jean Carlos 61'	Stadium: Estádio Augusto Bauer; Attendance: 1,346; Referee: Vinicius Goncalves Dias Araujo

7 June 2022 11	Náutico	2–3	Vasco da Gama	Recife
19:00 (UTC-3)	Thassio Melo 69'; Jean Carlos 90+9'	Report	Figueiredo 28'; Andrey Santos 43'; Nenê 77'	Stadium: Estádio José do Rego Maciel (Arruda); Attendance: 6,104; Referee: Flávio Rodrigues de Souza

10 June 2022 12	Sampaio Corrêa	2–0	Náutico	São Luís
19:00 (UTC-3)	Pimentinha 38'; Gabriel Poveda 45+1'	Report		Stadium: Estádio Governador João Castelo (Castelão); Attendance: 2,105; Referee: Antonio Dib Moraes de Sousa

18 June 2022 13	Náutico	1–1	Sport	Recife
18:30 (UTC-3)	Richard Franco 75'	Report	Kayke 35'	Stadium: Estádio Eládio de Barros Carvalho (Aflitos); Attendance: 6,011; Referee: Wagner do Nascimento Magalhães

26 June 2022 14	Tombense	1–1	Náutico	Muriaé
11:00 (UTC-3)	Ciel 90+7'	Report	Amarildo 38'	Stadium: Estádio Soares de Azevedo; Attendance: 1,175; Referee: Leonardo Willers Lorenzatto

29 June 2022 15	Náutico	1–1	Criciúma	Recife
19:00 (UTC-3)	Bruno 44'	Report	Leonardo 31'	Stadium: Estádio Eládio de Barros Carvalho (Aflitos); Attendance: 4,089; Referee: Andre Luiz de Freitas Castro

2 July 2022 16	Náutico	3–1	Novorizontino	Recife
18:30 (UTC-3)	Richard Franco 2', 43'; Pedro Vitor 6'	Report	Cleo Silva 77'	Stadium: Estádio Eládio de Barros Carvalho (Aflitos); Attendance: 4,671; Referee: Jefferson Ferreira de Moraes

8 July 2022 17	Grêmio	2–0	Náutico	Porto Alegre
21:30 (UTC-3)	Ferreira 43'; Bruno Alves 78'	Report		Stadium: Arena do Grêmio; Attendance: 23,879; Referee: Bráulio da Silva Machado

17 July 2022 18	Náutico	1–2	Chapecoense	Recife
16:00 (UTC-3)	Geuvânio 47'	Report	Léo 74'; Xandão 90+1'	Stadium: Estádio Eládio de Barros Carvalho (Aflitos); Attendance: 8,098; Referee: Denis da Silva Ribeiro Serafim

20 July 2022 19	Ponte Preta	1–0	Náutico	Campinas
19:00 (UTC-3)	Eliel 84'	Report		Stadium: Estádio Moisés Lucarelli; Attendance: 5,798; Referee: Jefferson Ferreira de Moraes

23 July 2022 20	Náutico	1–2	Londrina	Recife
18:30 (UTC-3)	Kieza 32'	Report	Douglas Coutinho 57', 71'	Stadium: Estádio Eládio de Barros Carvalho (Aflitos); Attendance: 9,636; Referee: Antonio Dib Moraes de Sousa

29 July 2022 21	Bahia	3–0	Náutico	Salvador
19:00 (UTC-3)	Ignácio 70'; Matheus Davó 75'; Everton 83'	Report		Stadium: Itaipava Arena Fonte Nova; Attendance: 28,484; Referee: Flávio Rodrigues de Souza

5 August 2022 22	Operário	1–0	Náutico	Ponta Grossa
19:00 (UTC-3)	Leonardo Kalil 90'	Report		Stadium: Estádio Germano Krüger; Attendance: 3,794; Referee: Vinicius Goncalves Dias Araujo

10 August 2022 23	Náutico	2–1	CRB	Recife
19:00 (UTC-3)	Maurício 38'; Jobson 41'	Report	Gabriel Conceição 59'	Stadium: Estádio Eládio de Barros Carvalho (Aflitos); Attendance: 12,279; Referee: Rafael Traci

13 August 2022 24	Guarani	1–0	Náutico	Campinas
18:30 (UTC-3)	Jenison 49'	Report		Stadium: Estádio Brinco de Ouro da Princesa; Attendance: 5,191; Referee: Diego Pombo Lopez

19 August 2022 25	Náutico	1–2	Vila Nova	Recife
21:30 (UTC-3)	Rafael Donato 17' (o.g.)	Report	Wágner 78'; Rafael Donato 90'	Stadium: Estádio Eládio de Barros Carvalho (Aflitos); Attendance: 13,196; Referee: Jean Pierre Goncalves Lima

26 August 2022 26	Cruzeiro	4–0	Náutico	Belo Horizonte
21:30 (UTC-3)	Edu 25'; Eduardo Brock 68'; Lincoln 81' (pen.); Jajá 87'	Report		Stadium: Estádio Raimundo Sampaio (Independência); Attendance: 21,228; Referee: Rodolpho Toski Marques

30 August 2022 27	CSA	2–0	Náutico	Maceió
21:30 (UTC-3)	Élton 50'; Lucas Barcellos 68'	Report		Stadium: Estádio Rei Pelé; Attendance: 9,644; Referee: Anderson Daronco

2 September 2022 28	Náutico	2–0	Ituano	Recife
19:00 (UTC-3)	Geuvânio 77'; Souza 86'	Report		Stadium: Estádio Eládio de Barros Carvalho (Aflitos); Attendance: 10,468; Referee: Marcelo de Lima Henrique

9 September 2022 29	Náutico	1–0	Brusque	Recife
21:30 (UTC-3)	Geuvânio 64'	Report		Stadium: Estádio Eládio de Barros Carvalho (Aflitos); Attendance: 13,466; Referee: Wágner do Nascimento Magalhães

16 September 2022 30	Vasco da Gama	4–1	Náutico	Rio de Janeiro
19:00 (UTC-3)	Raniel 33'; Eguinaldo 38'; Andrey Santos 47'; Figueiredo 88'	Report	Éverton 72'	Stadium: Estádio Vasco da Gama (São Januário); Attendance: 19,152; Referee: Bráulio da Silva Machado

23 September 2022 31	Náutico	1–3	Sampaio Corrêa	Recife
19:00 (UTC-3)	Júlio 5'	Report	Gabriel Poveda 39'; Rafael Costa 87'; Nadson 90+4'	Stadium: Estádio Eládio de Barros Carvalho (Aflitos); Attendance: 15,314; Referee: Dyorgines Jose Padovani de Andrade

28 September 2022 32	Sport	2–1	Náutico	Recife
21:45 (UTC-3)	Fabinho 20'; Vágner Love 62'	Report	Geuvânio 6'	Stadium: Estádio Adelmar da Costa Carvalho (Ilha do Retiro); Attendance: 19,521; Referee: Anderson Daronco

4 October 2022 33	Náutico	4–3	Tombense	Recife
21:30 (UTC-3)	Wellington 16'; Victor Ferraz 30'; Éverton 41'; Jean Carlos 80'	Report	Kleiton 10'; Igor 64'; Jean Lucas 73'	Stadium: Estádio Eládio de Barros Carvalho (Aflitos); Attendance: 5,575; Referee: Alisson Sidnei Furtado

7 October 2022 34	Criciúma	2–1	Náutico	Criciúma
19:00 (UTC-3)	Hygor 20'; Lohan 78'	Report	Éverton 27'	Stadium: Estádio Heriberto Hülse; Attendance: 9,799; Referee: Diego Pombo Lopez

14 October 2022 35	Novorizontino	6–0	Náutico	Novo Horizonte
21:30 (UTC-3)	Douglas Baggio 20', 35'; Ronald 53'; Torres 71'; Rômulo 77'; Hélio Borges 79'	Report		Stadium: Estádio Doutor Jorge Ismael de Biasi; Attendance: 1,105; Referee: Wagner do Nascimento Magalhães

23 October 2022 36	Náutico	0–3	Grêmio	Recife
16:00 (UTC-3)		Report	Bitello 26', 67'; Lucas Leiva 62'	Stadium: Estádio Eládio de Barros Carvalho (Aflitos); Attendance: 6,961; Referee: Jefferson Ferreira de Moraes

29 October 2022 37	Chapecoense	1–0	Náutico	Chapecó
19:00 (UTC-3)	Willian Popp 27'	Report		Stadium: Arena Condá; Attendance: 14,047; Referee: José Mendonça da Silva Junior

4 November 2022 38	Náutico	0–1	Ponte Preta	Recife
21:30 (UTC-3)		Report	Léo Naldi 71'	Stadium: Estádio Eládio de Barros Carvalho (Aflitos); Attendance: 4,011; Referee: Roger Goulart

==== Record ====
Final Position	Points	Matches	Wins	Draws	Losses	Goals For	Goals Away	Win%
20th	30	38	8	6	24	32	65	26%
