= Fantick =

Fantick may refer to:

- Fantick (footballer, born 1955) (1955–2024), Brazilian football left back Francisco de Assis dos Santos
- Fantick (footballer, born 1977), Brazilian football forward Márcio Delvi da Costa
