= Giva =

Giva is a nickname. It may refer to:

- Giva (footballer, born 1993), full name Givanildo Pulgas da Silva, Brazilian footballer
- Giva (footballer, born 1999), full name Geovane Silva Santos, Brazilian footballer
