= Fábio Silva =

Fábio Silva may refer to:

- Fábio Silva (politician) (born 1976), Brazilian politician
- Fabio Silva (footballer, born 1977), Brazilian football midfielder
- Fábio Silva (footballer, born 1980) (Fábio Carleandro da Silva), Brazilian footballer
- Fábio Silva (fighter) (born 1982), Brazilian mixed martial artist
- Fábio (footballer, born 1983) (Fábio do Nascimento Silva), Brazilian footballer
- Fábio (footballer, born October 1984) (José Fábio da Silva), Brazilian footballer
- Fábio Ferreira (footballer, born 1984) (Fábio Ferreira da Silva), Brazilian footballer
- Fábio Silva (footballer, born 1985) (Fábio Emanuel Moreira Silva), Cape Verdean footballer
- Fabio (footballer, born 1990) (Fabio Pereira da Silva), Brazilian footballer
- Fábio da Silva Bordignon (born 1992), Brazilian paralympic athlete
- Samu (footballer) (Fábio Samuel Amorim Silva, born 1996), Portuguese footballer
- Fábio Silva (footballer, born 2002) (Fábio Daniel Soares Silva), Portuguese footballer
