= Tonho =

Tonho may refer to:

- Tonho (footballer, born 1938), Antônio dos Santos Nascimento, Brazilian goalkeeper
- Tonho (footballer, born 1950), Antônio Martes da Luz, Brazilian forward
- Tonho (footballer, born 1954), Antônio Santos da Silva, Brazilian goalkeeper
- Tonho Gil (born 1957), Antônio José Gil, Brazilian midfielder

== See also ==
- Tonho (name), more people with this name or nickname
