= Juan Antonio Rodríguez =

Juan Antonio Rodríguez may refer to:

- Juan Antonio Rodríguez (tennis) (born 1962), Spanish tennis player
- Chi-Chi Rodríguez (1935–2024), Puerto Rican golfer
- Juan Antonio Rodríguez Duflox (born 1937), Spanish footballer
- Juan Antonio Rodríguez Villamuela (born 1982), Spanish footballer

== See also ==
- Juan Rodríguez (disambiguation)
