= Irmã Mônica =

Brazilian influencer and activist (born 1976)

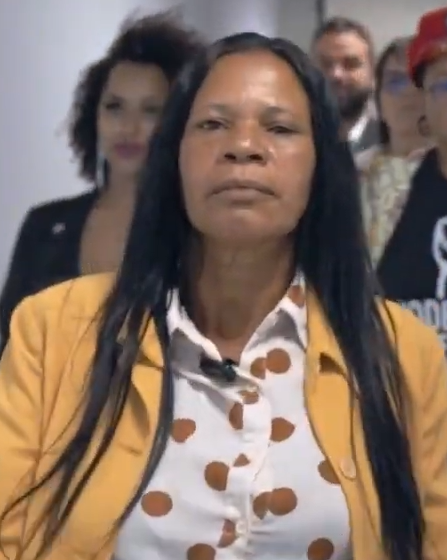
- Irmã Mônica at the Chamber of Deputies in 2023
- Born: Maria Mônica Bispo do Nascimento; 11 February 1976 (age 50); Maceió, Alagoas, Brazil
- Other name: Mônica do Véu
- Occupations: Digital influencer; activist
- Years active: 2022–present

Maria Mônica Bispo do Nascimento (born 11 February 1976), better known as Irmã Mônica (Brazilian Portuguese: [iʁmɐ̃ ˈmonikɐ]), is a Brazilian Evangelical digital influencer connected to the Christian Congregation in Brazil. She became well known during the 2022 Brazilian general election for supporting presidential candidate Luiz Inácio Lula da Silva and criticizing Jair Bolsonaro in humorous videos that combined political and religious themes. The statements from Mônica drew criticism and attacks from Bolsonaro supporters. As of 2024, she is part of the Workers' Party.

She is supportive of LGBTQ rights and frequently denounces homophobia and other types of violence against minorities, having been invited for parliamentary visit for this cause in the National Congress.

== Biography ==
Maria Mônica Bispo do Mônica was born in Maceió, Alagoas, on 11 February 1976. She grew up frequenting Evangelical churches, but stated that she only "accepted Jesus" after the death of her mother, when she was 9 years old. In 2013, she moved to the suburbs of Brasília together with her husband and son. In the same year, she joined the Christian Congregation in Brazil, which she says that "inside the church they do not allow for politics".

During the first round of the 2022 Brazilian general election, Mônica became a political activist, as she prayed for the protection of then-candidate Luiz Inácio Lula da Silva. She became well known for her stance against Jair Bolsonaro, which is endorsed by many Evangelical Catholics in the country, as well as his supporters. In her posts, she asks for the imprisoning and ineligibility of Bolsonaro.

=== Politics and activism ===
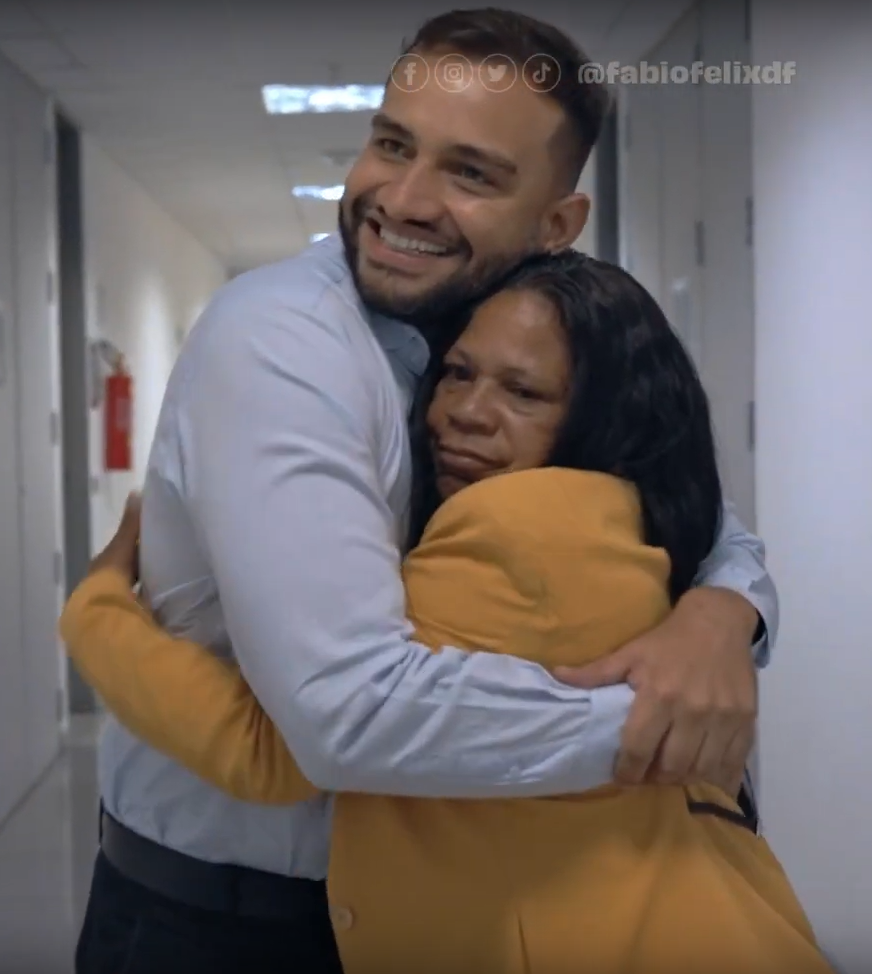
Irmã Mônica during a visit to Chamber of Deputies cabinet minister Fábio Felix.

The digital debut of Mônica started with influence from her son, which convinced her to film Internet videos. Her videos, which contained religious themes and defended the LGBTQ community, became viral and were shared as Internet memes, growing her social media accounts to 500 thousand follows in June 2023. When asked why she started her activism for minorities, she declared that "God revealed to me in my dreams that I had to care for the LGBT people. He told me: 'my daughter, take care of my people. Pray for them, don't let anyone touch me, defend them.' Now I'm part of this fight".

Irmã Mônica first viralized in August 2022, in a video where she prayed holding a Bible in front of a portrait of Lula. In November, she went viral again for prophesizing strong storms over the camps of Bolsonaro supporters in front of quarters in Brasília, where they protested against the election results. A few days later, on 15 November, these camps were partially destroyed due to strong rainfall, and Mônica declared that "God would sent a strong storm and, on the day that I published the video, it happened".

The account run by Irmã Mônica diverges from the norm of other religious figures in Brazil, who mostly consider LGBTQ people as sinners, a position which the influencer rejects: "what I see in them is love".

Irmã Mônica is an activist for human rights and has participated in pride parades in several Brazilian states, as well as marching together with indigenous people in manifestations against the Marco Temporal project.

In August 2023, after speculations about Mônica possibly being a candidate for federal deputy in Goiás for the Workers' Party, Irmã Mônica responded that she would enter politics "if God ordered".

== Attacks by Bolsonaro supporters ==
=== Offensives by Antônia Fontenelle ===
On 17 May 2023, The Morning Show from the Jovem Pan, a radio network connected to the far-right and supporter of Jair Bolsonaro, screened a video that later viralized, where Mônica affirms that "I did the L for it [...] it will decrease everything. Amen" in relation to the reduction of fuel prices during Lula's presidency. Presenter Antônia Fontenelle claimed that "this wretch probably does not even own a car. This type of comments gives space for these miserable people lacking soul, spirit, and education. It's the same as giving voice to thieves."

After this event, YouTuber Felipe Neto offered his lawyer team in order for Irmã Mônica to sue Fontenelle against her attacks. Mônica affirmed that she would sue the presenter for her humiliating statements on television. She received a wave of solidarity from the internet after this incident.
