= Fabius Township =

Fabius Township may refer to:

== Iowa ==
- Fabius Township, Davis County, Iowa

== Michigan ==
- Fabius Township, Michigan

== Missouri ==
- Fabius Township, Knox County, Missouri
- Fabius Township, Marion County, Missouri
- Fabius Township, Schuyler County, Missouri
