= Thomaz Carvalho =

Brazilian footballer

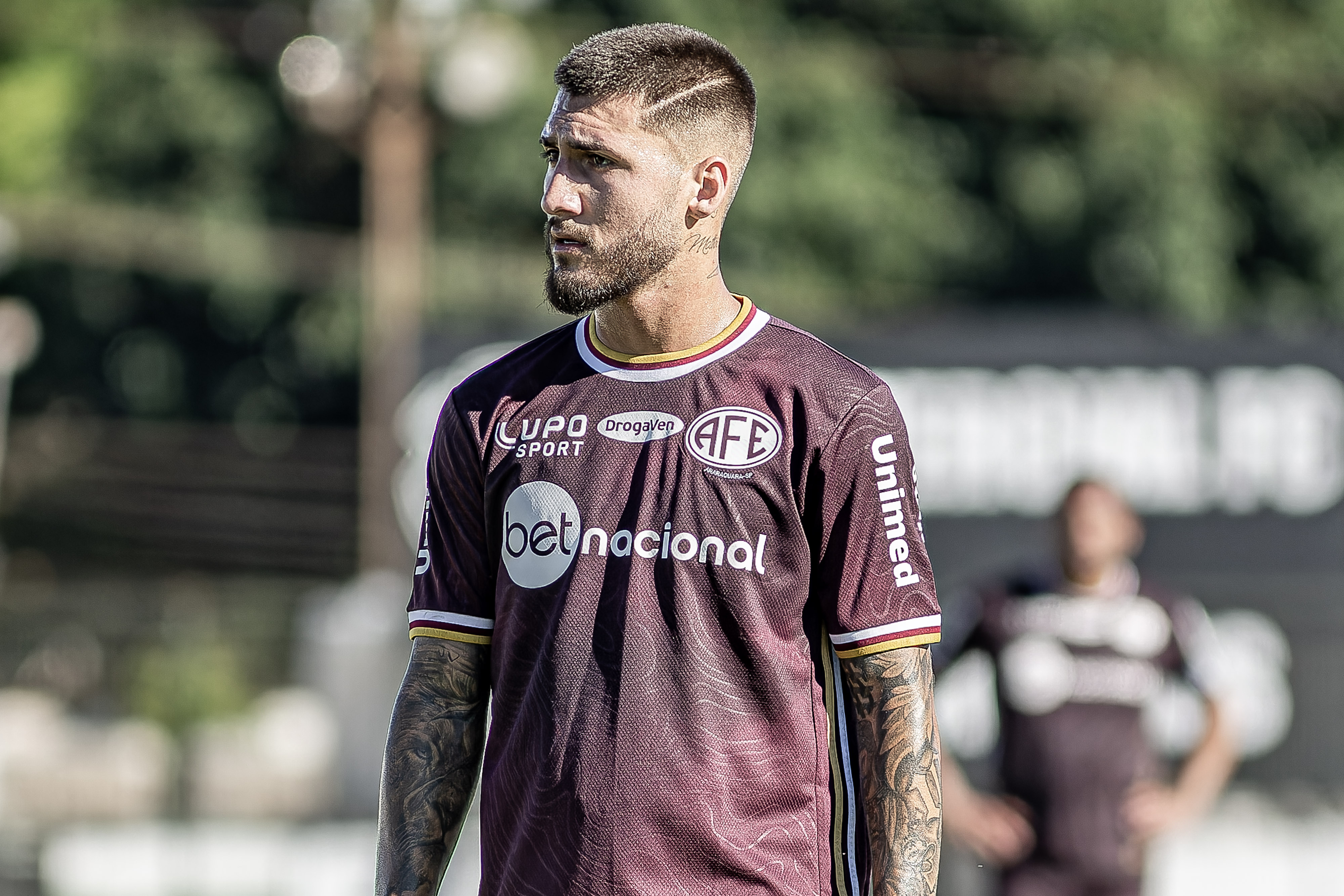
- Thomaz playing for Ferroviária in 2024

Personal information
- Full name: Thomaz Carvalho Costa
- Date of birth: 20 May 2001 (age 25)
- Place of birth: Curitiba, Brazil
- Height: 1.75 m (5 ft 9 in)
- Position: Midfielder

Team information
- Current team: São José-SP
- Number: 7

Youth career
- 2012–2020: Coritiba
- 2021: Ferroviária

Senior career*
Years	Team	Apps	(Gls)
2020	Coritiba	0	(0)
2020	→ Atlético Tubarão (loan)	1	(0)
2021	Metropolitano	0	(0)
2022–2024	Ferroviária	62	(3)
2022	→ Náutico (loan)	12	(0)
2024	→ CRAC (loan)	7	(0)
2025	São Joseense	13	(1)
2025	Brusque	21	(2)
2026–	São José-SP	20	(1)
2026	→ Joinville (loan)	6	(1)
- * Club domestic league appearances and goals as of 18:09, 2 July 2026 (UTC)

Thomaz Carvalho Costa (born 20 May 2001), known as Thomaz Carvalho or just Thomaz, is a Brazilian footballer who plays as a midfielder for São José-SP.

== Career ==
Born in Curitiba, Paraná, Thomaz joined the youth categories of hometown side Coritiba in 2012, but made his senior debut while on loan at Atlético Tubarão in 2020. On 17 February 2021, he moved to Metropolitano, but did not play and subsequently signed for Ferroviária, initially for the under-20 squad.

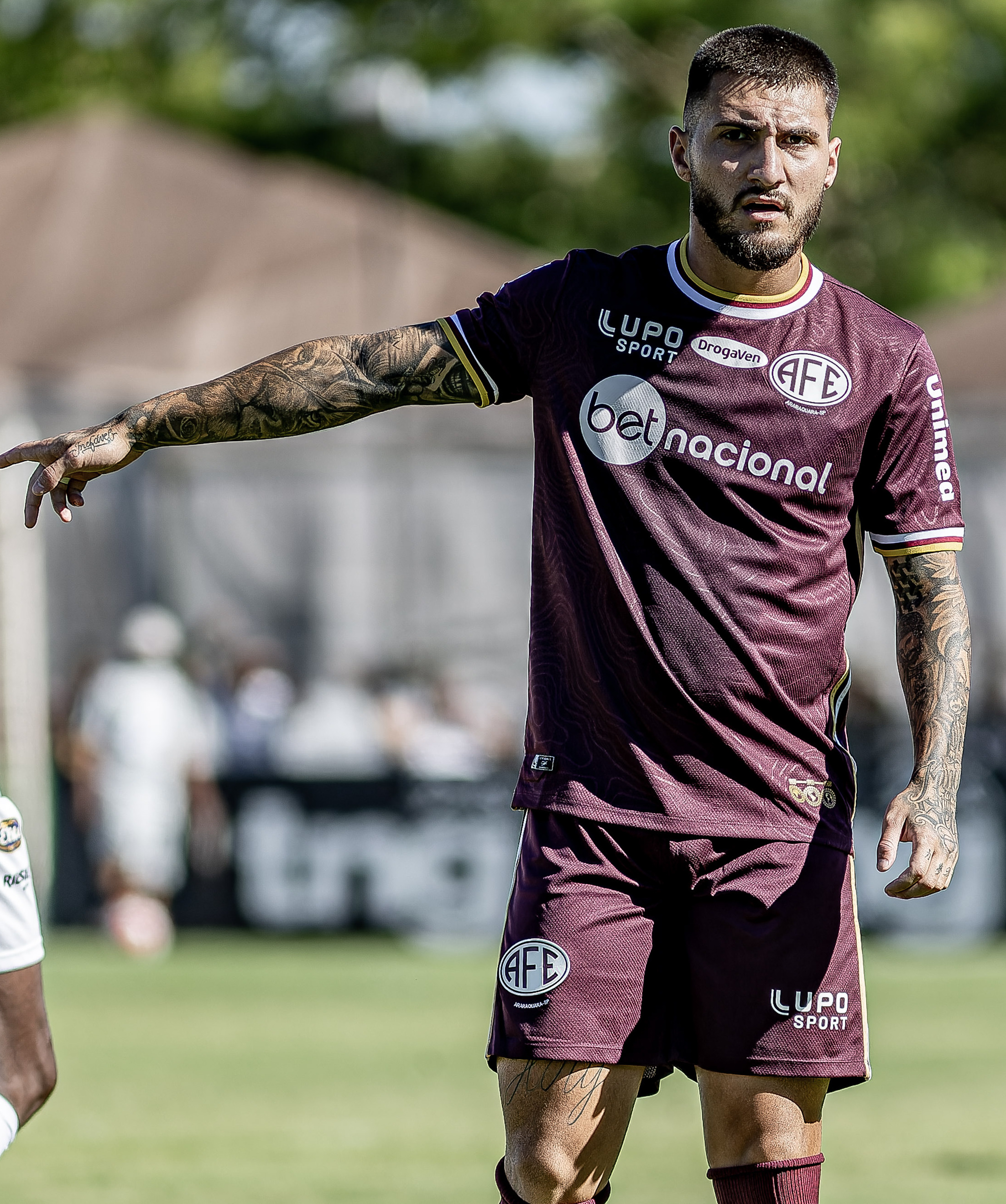
Thomaz playing for Ferroviária in 2024

Thomaz renewed his contract with AFE for two further seasons on 17 December 2021, and played for the first team before being loaned out to Náutico on 26 July 2022. He further extended his link with Ferroviária until 2024 on 22 December, and was regularly used during the 2023 season.

On 25 June 2024, after losing his starting spot, Thomaz was loaned to CRAC. He started the 2025 season at São Joseense, impressing in the Campeonato Paranaense, and moved to Brusque on 19 March of that year.

On 5 November 2025, São José-SP announced the signing of Thomaz for the upcoming campaign. The following 29 April, he was loaned to Joinville.

== Career statistics ==
As of 2 July 2026

Club	Season	League			State League		Cup		Continental		Other		Total	
Club	Season	Division	Apps	Goals	Apps	Goals	Apps	Goals	Apps	Goals	Apps	Goals	Apps	Goals
Atlético Tubarão	2020	Série D	—		1	0	—		—		—		1	0
Metropolitano	2021	Catarinense	—		0	0	—		—		—		0	0
Ferroviária	2022	Série D	12	0	9	1	1	0	—		—		22	1
Ferroviária	2023	Série D	18	0	9	0	—		—		—		27	0
Ferroviária	2024	Série C	2	0	12	2	—		—		—		14	2
Ferroviária	Total		32	0	30	3	1	0	—		—		63	3
Náutico (loan)	2022	Série B	12	0	—		—		—		—		12	0
CRAC (loan)	2024	Série D	7	0	—		—		—		—		7	0
São Joseense	2025	Paranaense	—		13	1	—		—		—		13	1
Brusque	2025	Série C	21	2	—		2	0	—		5 (Note: Appearance(s) in Copa Santa Catarina)	0	28	2
São José-SP	2026	Paulista A2	—		20	1	—		—		0	0	20	1
Joinville (loan)	2026	Série D	6	1	—		—		—		—		6	1
Career total			78	3	64	5	3	0	0	0	5	0	150	8
