= Fabio de Souza =

Fabio de Souza may refer to:

- Fábio de Souza (footballer born 1975), Brazilian footballer for FC Herisau
- Fábio Souza de Oliveira (born 1984), Brazilian footballer for Goiás
- Fábio de Souza Loureiro (born 1980), Brazilian footballer in Honduras
- Fábio Fernandes de Sousa (born 1982), Brazilian politician from Goiás
