= Nandinho =

Nandinho may refer to:

- Nandinho (footballer, born 1973), Portuguese football manager and former right winger
- Nandinho (footballer, born 1975), Portuguese former football right-back
- Nandinho Andrade (born 1996), also known as Nandinho, Portuguese football left-back
- Nandinho (footballer, born 1998), Angolan football center-back
- Nandinho (futsal player), Portuguese futsal player Fernando Manuel Silva Leal (born 1982)

== See also ==
- Elías Nandino (1900–1993), Mexican poet
