= Victor Ferraz =

Brazilian footballer (born 1988)

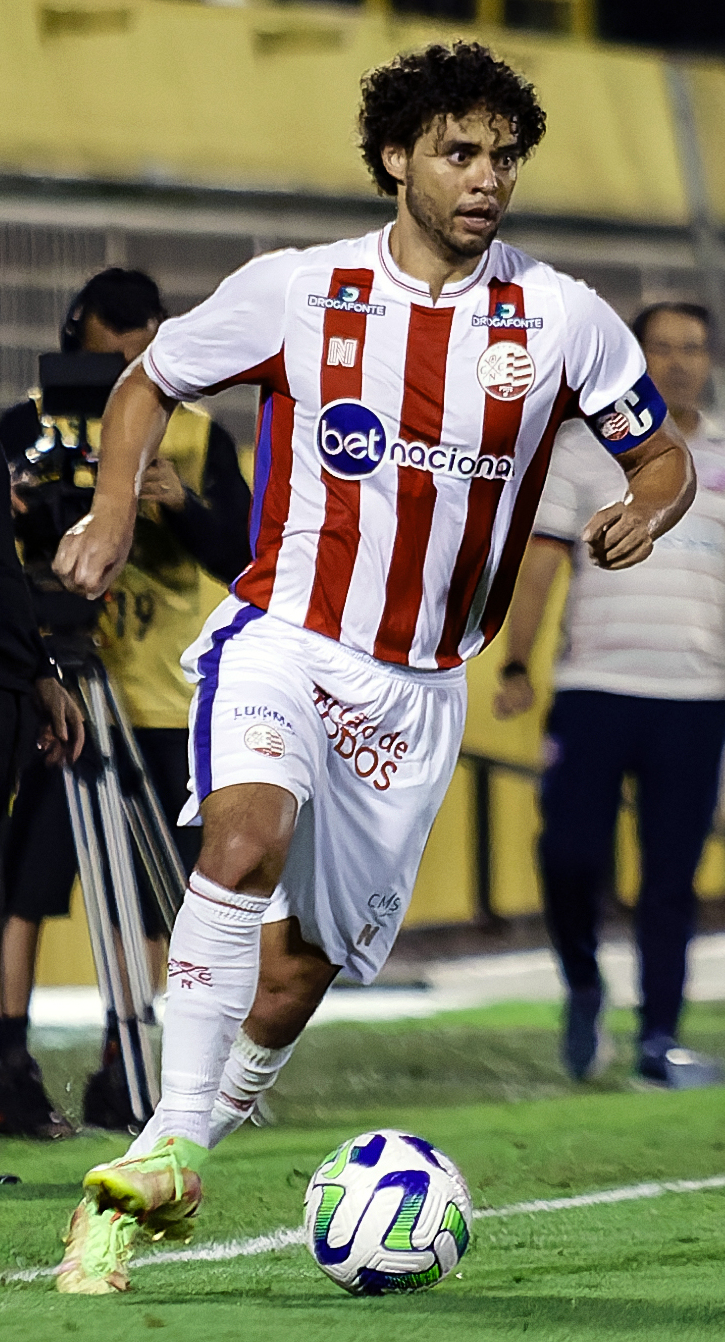
- Victor Ferraz with Náutico in 2023

Personal information
- Full name: Victor Ferraz Macedo
- Date of birth: 14 January 1988 (age 38)
- Place of birth: João Pessoa, Brazil
- Height: 1.74 m (5 ft 8 1/2 in)
- Position: Right-back

Team information
- Current team: Botafogo-PB (head coach)

Youth career
- Botafogo-PB
- 1999: Vitória
- 2000–2001: São Paulo
- 2002: Atlético Paranaense
- 2002–2007: Náutico
- 2007–2008: Iraty

Senior career*
Years	Team	Apps	(Gls)
2008	Iraty		
2009–2010	São José-RS	16	(0)
2010	Águia de Marabá	12	(1)
2010–2011	Atlético Goianiense	27	(2)
2011	Vila Nova	21	(1)
2012	Bragantino	36	(1)
2012–2014	Coritiba	63	(0)
2014–2019	Santos	217	(9)
2020–2021	Grêmio	29	(0)
2022–2023	Náutico	58	(5)
2023	Chapecoense	11	(0)
2024	Tacuary	28	(0)
2025–2026	Serra Branca	18	(3)
Total		436	(22)

Managerial career
- 2026: Botafogo-PB (assistant)
- 2026: Botafogo-PB (interim)
- 2027–: Botafogo-PB
- * Club domestic league appearances and goals

Victor Ferraz Macedo (born 14 January 1988) is a Brazilian football coach and former player who played as a right-back. He is the current head coach of Botafogo-PB.

== Career ==
=== Early career ===
Born in João Pessoa, Paraíba, Ferraz made his senior debut with Iraty in 2008. In the following year, he moved to São José-RS and played for Águia de Marabá in 2010.

=== Atlético Goianiense / Vila Nova ===
In May 2010, Ferraz joined Campeonato Brasileiro Série A side Atlético Goianiense. He made his division debut on 8 August, starting in a 0–0 away draw against Ceará.

Ferraz scored his first Série A goal on 22 August, in a 1–1 away draw against Internacional. Atlético released him in July 2011, and subsequently joined Vila Nova.

=== Bragantino / Coritiba ===
On 5 January 2012, Ferraz joined Bragantino. In August, he moved to Coritiba; initially as a backup to Ayrton, he appeared regularly during the remainder of the campaign, and was also an ever-present figure the following year.

=== Santos ===
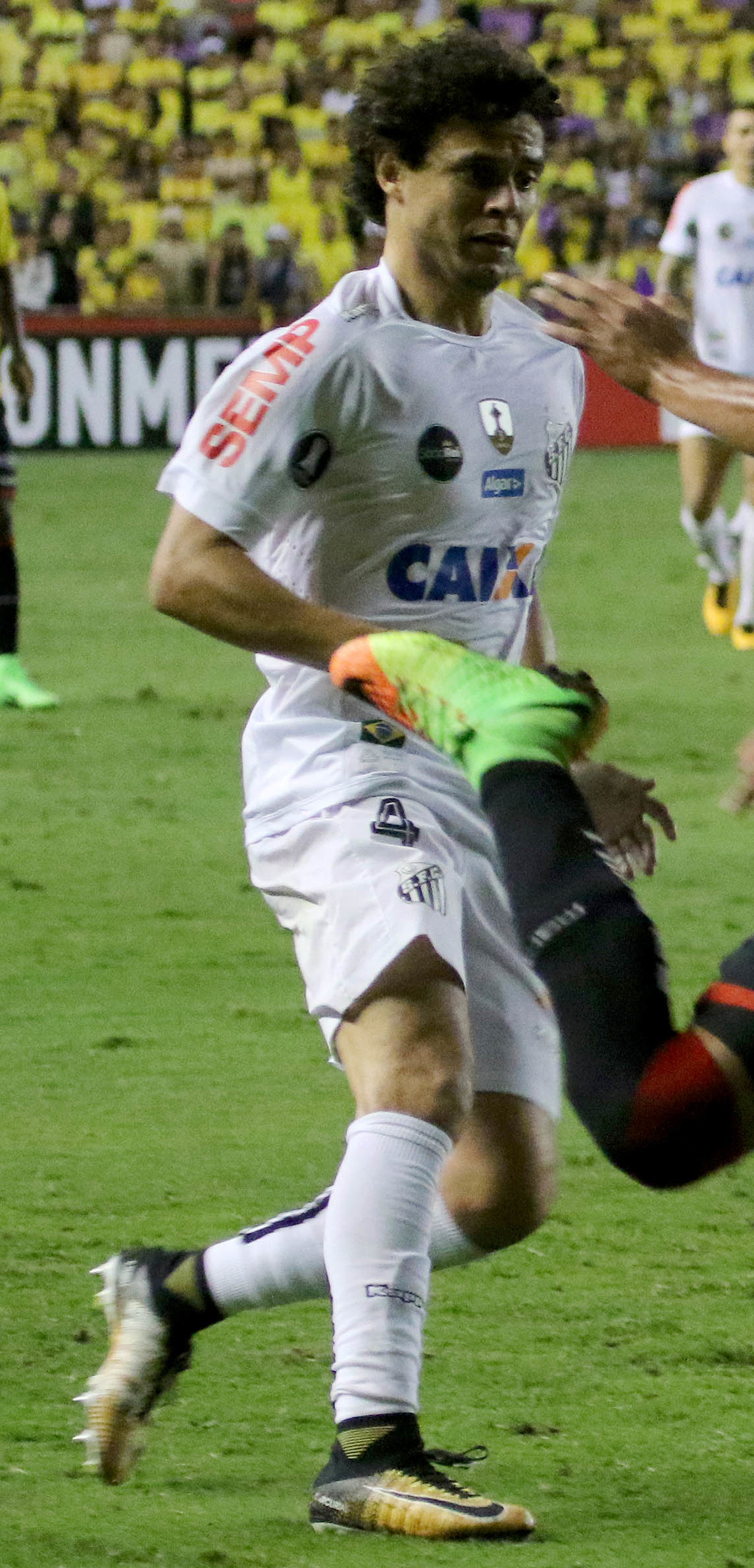
Victor Ferraz in action for Santos in 2018

On 24 June 2014, Ferraz signed a one-and-a-half-year deal with Santos. He debuted for the club on 17 July, starting in a 2–0 home win over Palmeiras.

In 2015, Ferraz was one of the most used players by Peixe, and after the departure of Cicinho, was assigned the no. 4 shirt. On 18 August, he scored his first goal for the club, netting the game's only goal through a direct free kick in a 1–0 home success over Vasco.

On 3 August 2016, Ferraz completed his 100th game for the club, starting in a 0–0 home draw against Flamengo. He made his Copa Libertadores debut on 9 March of the following year, starting in a 1–1 away draw against Sporting Cristal.

On 9 March 2018, Ferraz extended his contract until 2020. For the 2019 campaign, he became team captain after the departure of David Braz and the retirement of Renato.

=== Grêmio ===
On 14 December 2019, Ferraz moved to fellow top-tier side Grêmio on a two-year deal, with Madson moving in the opposite direction. Regularly used during the 2020 season, he terminated his link with the club on 9 November 2021, after just three matches in the year.

=== Later career ===
Ferraz in action for Náutico in 2023

On 7 April 2022, after nearly a year without playing a match, Ferraz signed for Náutico. After two seasons as a regular starter, he left the club in August 2023 to join Chapecoense.

On 18 January 2024, Ferraz joined Paraguayan side Tacuary and played abroad for the first time in his career. He returned to his home country after signing for Serra Branca in his native state on 4 December,

Ferraz departed Serra Branca on 19 March 2026, and announced his retirement at the age of 38 on 20 April.

== Coaching career ==
On 20 May 2026, Ferraz was appointed permanent assistant coach of Botafogo-PB, a club he already represented as a youth. On 27 September, he was named interim head coach of the side for the remaining two matches of the season, replacing sacked Marcelo Fernandes.

Despite being unable to achieve promotion with Belo, Ferraz was confirmed as head coach of the club for the upcoming season on 4 November 2026.

== Personal life ==
Victor Ferraz is a devout Evangelical Christian, being the child of missionary parents of the Assembleias de Deus church. In November 2017, he started a social project to help form young footballers in his home region, which was later registered as a football club named Associação Esportiva VF4 in 2018.

== Career statistics ==
Appearances and goals by club, season and competition
Club	Season	League			State League		Cup		Continental		Other		Total	
Club	Season	Division	Apps	Goals	Apps	Goals	Apps	Goals	Apps	Goals	Apps	Goals	Apps	Goals
São José-RS	2009	Série D	5	0	10	0	—		—		12 (Note: Appearance(s) in Copa FGF)	0	27	0
São José-RS	2010	Série D	0	0	1	0	—		—		—		1	0
São José-RS	Subtotal		5	0	11	0	—		—		12	0	28	0
Águia de Marabá	2010	Série C	0	0	12	1	—		—		—		12	1
Atlético Goianiense	2010	Série A	14	1	—		—		—		—		14	1
Atlético Goianiense	2011	Série A	0	0	13	1	2	0	—		—		15	1
Atlético Goianiense	Subtotal		14	1	13	1	2	0	—		—		29	2
Vila Nova	2011	Série B	21	1	—		—		—		—		21	1
Bragantino	2012	Série B	14	0	22	1	0	0	—		—		36	1
Coritiba	2012	Série A	14	0	—		—		—		—		14	0
Coritiba	2013	Série A	30	0	6	0	2	0	3 (Note: Appearance(s) in Copa Sudamericana)	0	—		41	0
Coritiba	2014	Série A	5	0	8	0	2	0	—		—		15	0
Coritiba	Subtotal		49	0	14	0	4	0	3	0	—		70	0
Santos	2014	Série A	5	0	—		0	0	—		—		5	0
Santos	2015	Série A	29	1	19	0	9	0	—		—		57	1
Santos	2016	Série A	37	1	18	1	5	0	—		—		60	2
Santos	2017	Série A	23	2	12	0	4	1	9 (Note: Appearance(s) in Copa Libertadores)	0	—		48	3
Santos	2018	Série A	32	3	4	0	3	0	2	0	—		41	3
Santos	2019	Série A	25	0	13	1	8	0	2	0	—		48	1
Santos	Subtotal		151	7	66	2	29	1	13	0	—		259	10
Grêmio	2020	Série A	17	0	11	0	8	0	6	1	—		42	1
Grêmio	2021	Série A	0	0	1	0	0	0	1	0	12 (Note: Appearance(s) in Recopa Gaúcha)	0	3	0
Grêmio	Subtotal		17	0	12	0	8	0	7	1	1	0	45	1
Náutico	2022	Série B	31	2	—		—		—		—		31	2
Náutico	2023	Série C	19	2	8	1	4	0	—		5 (Note: Appearance(s) in Copa do Nordeste)	1	36	4
Náutico	Subtotal		50	4	8	1	4	0	—		5	1	67	6
Chapecoense	2023	Série B	11	0	—		—		—		—		11	0
Tacuary	2024	División de Honor	28	0	—		—		—		—		28	0
Serra Branca	2025	Paraibano	—		10	2	—		—		—		10	2
Serra Branca	2026	Série D	—		8	1	1	0	—		—		9	1
Serra Branca	Subtotal		—		18	3	1	0	—		—		19	3
Career total			360	13	176	9	48	1	23	1	18	1	625	25

== Honours ==
=== Club ===
Atlético Goianiense

- Campeonato Goiano: 2011

Coritiba

- Campeonato Paranaense: 2013

Santos

- Campeonato Paulista: 2015, 2016

Grêmio

- Campeonato Gaúcho: 2020, 2021
- Recopa Gaúcha: 2021

=== Individual ===
- Campeonato Paulista Team of the Year: 2019
