= Fabio Santos =

Fabio Santos may refer to:

- Fábio Santos (fighter) (born 1956), Brazilian jiu-jitsu practitioner
- Fábio dos Santos Barbosa, born 1980, Brazilian football midfielder
- Fábio Santos Romeu, born 1985, Brazilian football left wingback
- José Fábio Santos de Oliveira, born 1987, Brazilian football striker
- Fábio Manuel Matos dos Santos, born 1988, Portugal football defender
- Fábio Alexandre Barbosa Santos, born 1992, Portugal football goalkeeper
- Fábio Alexandre Jesus Santos, born 1998, Portugal football defender
