= Kaadu =

Kaadu may refer to:

- Kaadu (Star Wars), a fictional creature from the Star Wars franchise
- Kaadu (1952 film), an Indian-American film
- Kaadu (1973 Kannada film), Indian Kannada-language film
- Kaadu (1973 Malayalam film), Indian Malayalam-language film
- Kaadu (2014 film), Indian Tamil-language film

== See also ==
- Kadu (disambiguation)
