= Guga =

Guga may refer to:

== Places ==
- Guga River (Papua New Guinea)
- Guga, a tributary of the river Iad in Romania
- Guga, a village in Cășeiu Commune, Cluj County, Romania
- Guga (Punjab), a village near to Amritsar in India

== People ==
- Aurel Guga (1898-1936), Romanian footballer
- Bledion Guga (born 1986), Albanian footballer
- Gustavo Kuerten (born 1976), Brazilian tennis player
- Guga (footballer, born 1964), Brazilian footballer Alexandre da Silva
- Guga (footballer, born 1977), Brazilian footballer José Augusto Santana Santos
- Guga (footballer, born 1998), Brazilian footballer Cláudio Rodrigues Gomes
- Guga (footballer, born 1997), Portuguese footballer Gonçalo Rodrigues
- Guga Foods (born 1980), Brazilian-American chef and YouTuber

== Other uses ==
- Guga, the Scottish name for the chicks of the Northern gannet. Most often used when referring to the guga hunt.
- Graphical unitary group approach (GUGA), in quantum chemistry

== See also ==
- Gugga, a figure in Punjabi legend
