= Geovane =

Geovane is a given name. It may refer to:

- Geovane Fernández (born 1982), Uruguayan racing cyclist
- Geovane (footballer, born 1985), José Thomaz Geovane de Oliveira, Brazilian football forward
- Geovane (footballer, born 1989), Geovane Batista de Faria, Brazilian football midfielder
- Geovane Maranhão (born 1989), Geovane Diniz Silva, Brazilian football forward
- Geovane (footballer, born 1992), Geovane Batista Loubo, Brazilian football midfielder
- Geovane Magno (born 1994), Geovane Magno Cândido Silveira, Brazilian football attacking midfielder
- Geovane (footballer, born 1996), Geovane Henrique Pereira de Souza, Brazilian football right-back
- Geovane (footballer, born 1998), Geovane Nascimento Silva, Brazilian football midfielder
- Geovane (footballer, born March 1999), Geovane da Silva de Souza, Brazilian football midfielder
- Giva (footballer, born 1999), Geovane Silva Santos, Brazilian football midfielder

== See also ==
- Giovanni (disambiguation)
