= Juanín =

Juanín may refer to:

== Nickname ==
- Juanín (footballer, born 1900) (1900–?), Spanish footballer Juan Bilbao Mintegi
- Juanín (footballer, born 1925), Spanish footballer Juan Cortiñas Méndez
- Juanín (footballer, born 1937), Spanish footballer Juan Antonio Rodríguez Duflox
- Juanín (footballer, born 1940) (1940–2013), Spanish footballer Juan García Díaz
- Juanín (footballer, born 1958), Spanish footballer Juan Antonio López Moreno
- Juanín García (born 1977), Spanish handball player

== Given name ==
- Juanin Clay (1949–1995), American actress
- Juanín Juan Harry, a character from 31 Minutos, a Chilean children's TV show
