= Juanpe =

Juanpe is a Spanish nickname that is short for "Juan Pedro". Notable people include:

- Juanpe (footballer, born 1990), Spanish football forward Juan Pedro Berga Garzón
- Juanpe (footballer, born 1991), Spanish football defender Juan Pedro Ramírez López
- Juanpe (footballer, born 1996), Spanish football midfielder Juan Pedro Jiménez Melero
