= Erivelton =

Erivelton is a given name. It may refer to:

- Erivelto (footballer, born 1954), Brazilian football midfielder Erivélton Martins
- Erivelton (footballer, born 1978), Brazilian football centre-back Erivelton Gomes Viana
- Erivélton (footballer, born 1983), Brazilian football right-back Erivélton Aragão

== See also ==
- Erivelto (disambiguation)
- Elivelton (disambiguation)
