= Rodri (disambiguation) =

Rodri (Rodrigo Hernández Cascante; born 1996) is a Spanish football midfielder.

Rodri is a nickname for Rodrigo. Notable people known as Rodri include:

- Rodri (footballer, born 1934) (1934–2022), Francisco Rodríguez García, Spanish football defender for Barcelona
- Rodri (footballer, born 1971), Antonio Rodríguez Saravia, Spanish football forward and manager for Gimnàstic, etc.
- Rodri (footballer, born 1979), Rodrigo Gimeno Molina, Spanish football midfielder for Castellón
- Rodri (footballer, born 1984), Sergio Rodríguez García, Spanish football defender for Spartak Moscow, Eupen, etc.
- Rodri (footballer, born 1985), Rodrigo Ángel Gil Torres, Spanish football midfielder for Elche, Orihuela, etc.
- Rodri (footballer, born 1986), Rodrigo Suárez Peña, Spanish football midfielder for Betis
- Rodri (footballer, born 1990), Rodrigo Ríos Lozano, Spanish football forward for Córdoba, Oviedo, etc.
- Rodri (footballer, born 2000), Rodrigo Sánchez Rodríguez, Spanish football midfielder for Betis
- Rodri (footballer, born 2002), Rodrigo Suárez Marcos, Spanish football defender for Cultural Leonesa
- Rodri (footballer, born 2003), Rodrigo Alonso Martín, Spanish football midfielder for Villarreal

== See also ==
- Rodrigo (disambiguation)
- Rodriguez (disambiguation)
