= Guga River (Papua New Guinea) =

River in Papua New Guinea

Coordinates: 5°47′S 144°18′E

Guga River is a river of Papua New Guinea. It is part of the Wahgi River network.
