= Rodrigo (disambiguation) =

Rodrigo is a Spanish-language given name.

Rodrigo may also refer to:

== Sportspeople ==
- Rodrigo (footballer, born 1897) (Rodrigo Antonio Brandão, 1897–1959), Brazilian footballer
- Rodrigo (footballer, born 1971) (Rodrigo Martins Vaz), Brazilian footballer
- Rodrigo Chagas (born 1973), Brazilian footballer
- Rodrigo (footballer, born 1978) (Rodrigo Andreis Galvão), Brazilian footballer
- Rodrigo (footballer, born August 1980) (Rodrigo Baldasso da Costa), Brazilian footballer
- Rodrigo (footballer, born October 1980) (Rodrigo Lacerda Ramos), Brazilian footballer
- Rodrigo (footballer, born 1985) (Rodrigo Leandro da Costa), Brazilian footballer
- Rodrigo (footballer, born 1987) (Rodrigo Fagundes Freitas), Brazilian footballer
- Rodrigo (footballer, born 1991) (Rodrigo Moreno Machado), Brazilian-born Spanish footballer
- Rodrigo (footballer, born 1994) (Rodrigo Vasconcelos Oliveira), Brazilian footballer
- Rodrigo Freitas (footballer, born 1998), Brazilian footballer
- Rodrigo Freitas (footballer, born 2002), Portuguese footballer
- Rodrigo (footballer, born 1999) (Rodrigo Guimarães Santos), Brazilian footballer
- Rodrigo (beach soccer) (Rodrigo da Costa), born 1993, Brazilian beach soccer player
- Rodri (Rodrigo Hernández Cascante), born 1996, Spanish footballer

== Musicians ==
- Rodrigo (opera), a 1707 opera by George Frideric Handel
- Olivia Rodrigo (born 2003), American singer-songwriter and actress
- Joaquín Rodrigo, Spanish composer
- Rodrigo (musician) (Rodrigo Alejandro Bueno, 1973–2000), Argentine singer
