= Valtinho (footballer, born 1948) =

Brazilian footballer

Personal information
- Full name: Valter Alves da Silva
- Date of birth: 26 November 1948 (age 77)
- Place of birth: Rio de Janeiro, Brazil
- Height: 1.86 m (6 ft 1 in)
- Position: Centre-back

Youth career
- Fluminense

Senior career*
Years	Team	Apps	(Gls)
1967–1969	Fluminense	66	(0)
1970–1971	Portuguesa-RJ		
1971–1975	Madureira		
1975	Paysandu		
1976–1978	Remo		

International career
1967	Brazil U20		
- * Club domestic league appearances and goals as of 30 December 2023

Valter Alves da Silva (born 26 November 1948), better known as Valtinho, is a Brazilian former professional footballer who played as a centre-back.

== Career ==
The son of singers, Valtinho was part of the Brazil under-20 team that competed in the 1967 South American U-20 Championship in Paraguay. He made 66 appearances for Fluminense and was state champion in 1969. He also played for Portuguesa-RJ, Madureira, Paysandu and Remo.

== Honours ==
Fluminense

- Campeonato Carioca: 1969
