= Fabius Township, Schuyler County, Missouri =

Township in the American state of Missouri

Coordinates: 40.5378°N 92.4056°W

Fabius Township is an inactive township in Schuyler County, in the U.S. state of Missouri.

Fabius Township was erected in 1843 in the northeastern corner of the county, and most likely named after the North Fabius River.
