= Somália =

Somália is a nickname, and may refer to:

- Somália (footballer, born 1977), Brazilian striker Wanderson de Paula Sabino
- Somália (footballer, born 1984), Brazilian footballer Paulo Rogério Reis Silva
- Somália (footballer, born 1988), Brazilian footballer Wergiton do Rosario Calmon
- Matheus Nolasco (born 1995), Brazilian footballer known as Somália

== See also ==
- Somalia, a country in the Horn of Africa
