= Zeca =

Zeca is a nickname, sometimes a hypocorism in Portuguese for the compound name José Carlos (English: Joseph Charles).

It may refer to:

== Association football ==
- Zeca (footballer, born 1946), Brazilian football manager Jose Luiz Ferreira Rodrigues
- Zeca (footballer, born 1975), Portuguese footballer José António Gonçalves da Silva
- Zeca (footballer, born 1988), Portuguese-Greek footballer José Carlos Gonçalves Rodrigues
- Zeca (footballer, born 1990), Brazilian football left-back David da Silva Lima
- Zeca (footballer, born 1994), Brazilian footballer José Carlos Cracco Neto
- Zeca (footballer, born 1997), Brazilian footballer José Joaquim de Carvalho
- Zeca Amaral (born 1967), Angolan football manager
- Zeca Marques (born 1961), Portuguese South African footballer
- Zeca Miglietti (1943–2006), Mozambican footballer

== Arts and entertainment ==
- José Afonso (1929–1987), Portuguese folk and political musician also known as Zeca Afonso
- Zeca Baleiro, stage name of Brazilian pop musician José Ribamar Coelho Santos (born 1966)
- Zeca Camargo (born 1963), Brazilian television presenter, journalist and writer
- Zeca Pagodinho (born 1959), Brazilian singer/songwriter

== Politics ==
- Zeca Dirceu (born 1978), Brazilian politician
- Zeca do PT (born 1950), Brazilian banker and politician
