= Elivelton =

Elivelton is a given name. It may refer to:

- Elivélton (footballer, born 1971), Elivélton Alves Rufino, Brazilian football midfielder
- Elivélton (footballer, born May 1992), Elivélton Viana dos Santos, Brazilian football centre-back
- Elivelton (footballer, born 1995), Elivelton Ubiratan Oliveira de Lima, Brazilian football defender

== See also ==
- Elivelto (born 1992), Elivelton Ribeiro Dantas, Brazilian football striker
