= Juanpe (footballer, born 1990) =

Spanish footballer

Personal information
- Full name: Juan Pedro Berga Garzón
- Date of birth: 6 March 1990 (age 36)
- Place of birth: Palma, Spain
- Height: 1.74 m (5 ft 8 1/2 in)
- Position: Forward

Youth career
- 2002–2003: Mallorca
- 2003–2005: La Salle
- 2005–2009: San Francisco

Senior career*
Years	Team	Apps	(Gls)
2009–2010	Tatran B		
2010	Tatran Prešov	1	(0)
2010–2011	Alzira	23	(5)
2011	Real Linense	4	(0)
2012	Llosetense	9	(11)
2012	Atlético Baleares	8	(0)
2013	Zemplín Michalovce	5	(0)
2013	Constància	3	(0)
2014–2015	Llosetense	26	(5)
- * Club domestic league appearances and goals as of 4 December 2016

Juan Pedro Berga Garzón (born 6 March 1990 in Palma, Majorca), commonly known as Juanpe, is a Spanish footballer who plays as a forward.
