= Saint Fabius =

- Died: 303 or 304; Mauretania Caesariensis
- Venerated in: Catholic Church; Eastern Orthodox Church
- Feast: 31 July

Fabius (born on Mauretania, died 303 or 304 in Mauretania Caesariensis, nowadays Cherchell, Algeria) was a martyr of the Roman Empire from the ancient Mauretania, venerated as a saint by the Catholic Church and the Orthodox Church. The memory of the liturgy is scheduled on July 31.

== Hagiography ==
From Fabius' life it is known that he was commissioned to carry the banner of the governor when the latter organized a meeting. Fabius refused because the ceremony had pagan character. He was imprisoned, submitted to torture and tried to, but did not change his plans. Then Fabius was decapitated. For this reason he is nicknamed "the standard-bearer," because he did not want to carry a flag with pagan images.

== The cult ==
It is said that in order to prevent the burial his head and his body were thrown into the sea at different points but the sea called them together, and his remains are still preserved in Cartenna. His feast day is celebrated on July 31.
