= Tonho (footballer, born 1954) =

Brazilian footballer

Personal information
- Full name: Antônio Santos da Silva
- Date of birth: 12 December 1954
- Place of birth: São Paulo, Brazil
- Date of death: 6 October 2010 (aged 55)
- Place of death: Santo André, Brazil
- Position: Goalkeeper

Youth career
- –1972: Nacional-SP
- 1973–1974: Palmeiras

Senior career*
Years	Team	Apps	(Gls)
1974–1976	Palmeiras	14	(0)
1976–1977	Náutico		
1978–1979	Francana		
1980	Esportiva		
1980	São José-SP		
1981–1988	Santo André		
1984	→ EC São Bernardo (loan)		
1985	→ São Paulo (loan)	7	(0)
1988	→ Vitória (loan)		
1989	Rio Preto		
1990	Sampaio Corrêa		
1991	Santo André		
1995	Goiatuba		
- * Club domestic league appearances and goals as of 30 December 2023

Antônio Santos da Silva (12 December 1954 – 6 October 2010), better known as Tonho, was a Brazilian professional footballer who played as a goalkeeper.

== Career ==
Born in the Pirituba neighborhood in São Paulo, Tonho began his career at SE Palmeiras, being Émerson Leão's immediate reserve in 1974 and 1975. Náutico and Francana, and in 1981 he arrived at Santo André, the club where he played for most of his career. In 1985, he was loaned to São Paulo. On 11 April 1985, in a match against Grêmio, valid for the 1985 Campeonato Brasileiro Série A, he conceded an unusual goal from a free kick by Paulo Bonamigo, where he didn't hit the ball because he believed the shot would be an indirect free kick. He received the nickname "Tabuleiro Voador" (flying chessboard) at the club due to the checkered shirt he wore.

== Honours ==
São Paulo

- Campeonato Paulista: 1985

Nacional

- Copa São Paulo de Futebol Jr.: 1972

São José

- Campeonato Paulista Série A2: 1980

Santo André

- Campeonato Paulista Série A2: 1981
