= Tonho (footballer, born 1938) =

Brazilian footballer (1938–2018)

Personal information
- Full name: Antônio dos Santos Nascimento
- Date of birth: 19 May 1938
- Place of birth: Paraopeba, Brazil
- Date of death: 13 July 2018 (aged 80)
- Place of death: Rio Claro, Brazil
- Height: 5 ft 7 in (1.70 m)
- Position: Goalkeeper

Senior career*
Years	Team	Apps	(Gls)
1961–1962	Renascença		
1963–1967	Cruzeiro		
1968	Washington Whips	15	(0)
- Velo Clube
- Rio Claro
- Botafogo-SP
- Caldense
Total		15	(0)

Managerial career
- Velo Clube
- Rio Claro
- * Club domestic league appearances and goals

Antônio dos Santos Nascimento (19 May 1938 – 13 July 2018), commonly known as Tonho, was a Brazilian soccer player who played in the NASL.

== Death ==
Tonho died in July 2018, following an infection after surgery on his knee.

== Career statistics ==
=== Club ===
Club	Season	League			Cup		Other		Total	
Club	Season	Division	Apps	Goals	Apps	Goals	Apps	Goals	Apps	Goals
Washington Whips	1968	NASL	15	0	0	0	0	0	15	0
Career total			15	0	0	0	0	0	15	0
