= Fábio (footballer, born 1939) =

Brazilian footballer

Personal information
- Full name: Fábio Arlindo de Medeiros
- Date of birth: 11 November 1939
- Place of birth: Porciúncula, Brazil
- Date of death: 6 September 2020 (aged 80)
- Place of death: Belo Horizonte, Brazil
- Position: Goalkeeper

Senior career*
Years	Team	Apps	(Gls)
1959–1962	Atlético Mineiro		
1963–1965	Cruzeiro	76	(0)
1965–1967	São Paulo	43	(0)
1968	Atlético Mineiro		

International career
1966	Brazil	1	(0)
- * Club domestic league appearances and goals

Fábio Arlindo de Medeiros (11 November 1939 – 6 September 2020), simply known as Fábio, was a Brazilian professional footballer who played as a goalkeeper.

== Career ==
A goalkeeper in amateur tournaments, Fábio went to Belo Horizonte to study dentistry. He received an invitation to train at Atlético Mineiro and soon became Veludo's immediate reserve. In 1962, he was state champion and highlighted, moving to rival Cruzeiro. He also had a spell at São Paulo in 1966 and 1967, returning to Atlético Mineiro in 1968, where he retired from football. He made one appearance for the Brazil national team in 1966.

== Honours ==
Atlético Mineiro

- Campeonato Mineiro: 1962

== Death ==
Fábio died on 6 September 2020, in a hospital in Belo Horizonte, a victim of metastasis.
