= Léo Passos =

Brazilian footballer

Personal information
- Full name: Leonardo da Silva Passos
- Date of birth: 13 March 1999 (age 27)
- Place of birth: Campinas, Brazil
- Height: 1.83 m (6 ft 0 in)
- Position: Forward

Team information
- Current team: Ituano

Youth career
- –2012: Ponte Preta
- 2014–2019: Palmeiras

Senior career*
Years	Team	Apps	(Gls)
2019–2022	Palmeiras	1	(0)
2019	→ Londrina (loan)	17	(5)
2020–2022	→ América Mineiro (loan)	63	(4)
2022	Náutico	18	(2)
2023	Primavera	10	(2)
2024	Santo André	11	(0)
2024–2025	Primavera	20	(1)
2025–	Ituano	32	(3)
- * Club domestic league appearances and goals as of 11 November 2026

Leonardo "Léo" da Silva Passos (born 13 March 1999) is a Brazilian footballer who plays for Ituano.

== Honours ==
Náutico

- Campeonato Pernambucano: 2022

== Career statistics ==
As of 13 October 2021.

Club	Season	League			State League		Cup		Continental		Other		Total	
Club	Season	Division	Apps	Goals	Apps	Goals	Apps	Goals	Apps	Goals	Apps	Goals	Apps	Goals
Palmeiras	2019	Série A	0	0	1 (Note: Appearances in the Campeonato Paulista)	0	0	0	—		—		1	0
Londrina (loan)	2019	Série B	17	5	—		—		—		—		17	5
América Mineiro (loan)	2020	Série B	32	3	11 (Note: Appearances in the Campeonato Mineiro)	1	8	0	—		—		51	4
América Mineiro (loan)	2021	Série A	0	0	7	0	1	0	—		—		8	0
América Mineiro (loan)	Total		32	3	18	1	9	0	—		—		59	4
Career total			49	8	19	1	9	0	0	0	0	0	77	9
