= Juanlu =

Juanlu, a combination of the Spanish names Juan and Luis, is the name of:

- Juanlu (footballer, born 1972), Spanish football defender Juan Luis Bernal Cuéllar
- Juanlu (footballer, born 1980), Spanish football midfielder Juan Luis López Gómez
- Juanlu (footballer, born 1984), Spanish football midfielder Juan Luis Hens Lorite
- Juanlu (footballer, born 2003), Spanish football forward Juan Luis Sánchez Velasco
