= Vaguinho =

Vaguinho or Waguinho may refer to:

== Footballers ==
- Vaguinho (footballer, born 1950), Brazilian winger Wagno de Freitas
- Vaguinho (footballer, born 1969), Brazilian defender Vágner dos Santos
- Vaguinho (footballer, born 1981), Brazilian midfielder Vágner Luiz da Silva
- Waguinho Dias (born 1963), Brazilian former midfielder and manager

== Politicians ==
- Waguinho (politician) (born 1971), Brazilian politician

== See also ==
- Waguininho (born 1990), Brazilian footballer
