= Edinho =

Edinho is a Portuguese name, in origin a diminutive form of a forename such as Edison or Edson, both widely used as given names in South America and particularly in Brazil.

== Brazilian footballers ==
- Edinho (footballer, born 1955), Edino Nazareth Filho, defender
- Edinho (footballer, born 1966), Édson José Vichetin, right back
- Edinho (footballer, born 1967), Edon Amaral Neto, forward
- Edinho (footballer, born 1970), Edson Cholbi Nascimento, goalkeeper, son of Pelé
- Edinho (footballer, born 1974), Edoson Silva Martins, midfielder
- Edinho (footballer, born 1979), Edison Carlos Felícissimo Polidório, left back
- Edinho (footballer, born May 1982), Éder Luciano, forward
- Edinho (footballer, born 1983), Edimo Ferreira Campos, midfielder
- Edinho (footballer, born 1994), Francisco Edson Moreira Da Silva, midfielder

== Portuguese footballers ==
- Edinho (footballer, born July 1982), full name Arnaldo Edi Lopes da Silva, forward
- Edinho Júnior (born 1994), full name Edon Júnior Viegas Amaral, forward
