= Luizão =

Luizão is a Portuguese nickname. It may refer to:

- Luizão (footballer, born 1968), Brazilian football midfielder Luiz Antonio Ribeiro
- Luizão (footballer, born 1975), Brazilian football forward Luiz Carlos Bombonato Goulart
- Luizão (footballer, born 1980), Brazilian football defender Osvaldo Luiz Pereira
- Luizão (footballer, born 1987), Brazilian football defender Luiz Carlos Nascimento Júnior
- Luizão (footballer, born 1988), Brazilian football striker Luiz Fernando dos Santos
- Luizão (footballer, born 1990), Brazilian football centre-back Walter Luiz de Araújo
- Luizão (footballer, born 1998), Brazilian football midfielder Luiz Gustavo Novaes Palhares
- Luizão (footballer, born 2002), Brazilian football defender Luiz Gustavo Oliveira da Silva
- Luizão (footballer, born 2003), Brazilian football forward Luiz Guilherme Vieira da Silva
- Luizão Correa (born 1973), Brazilian beach volleyball player
- Luizão Maia (born 1949), Brazilian musician

== See also ==
- Luisão (born 1981), Brazilian football defender Ânderson Luís da Silva
