= Fabius Township, Marion County, Missouri =

Inactive township in the American state of Missouri

Coordinates: 39.8875°N 91.5300°W

Fabius Township is an inactive township in Marion County, in the U.S. state of Missouri.

Fabius Township was established in 1827, taking its name from the Fabius River.
