= Fábio Júnior (disambiguation) =

Fábio Jr. is a Brazilian singer.

Fábio Júnior may also refer to:

- Fábio Júnior Pereira (born 1977), Brazilian footballer
- Fábio Júnior Nascimento Santana (born 1983), Brazilian footballer
- Fábio Júnior dos Santos (born 1982), Brazilian footballer
