= Evaldo =

Evaldo is a given name. It may refer to:

== Footballers ==
- Evaldo (footballer, born 1945), Brazilian football forward Evaldo Cruz
- Evaldo (footballer, born 1982), Brazilian football left-back Evaldo dos Santos Fabiano
- Evaldo (footballer, born 1983), Brazilian football central defender Evaldo Silva dos Santos
- Evaldo Goncalves (born 1981), Brazilian football striker
- Evaldo Silva (born 1974), Brazilian football defender

== Others ==
- Evaldo Cabral de Mello (born 1936), Brazilian historian and diplomat
- Evaldo Gouveia (1928–2020), Brazilian singer-songwriter
- Evaldo Rosa (died 2019, musician killed by Brazilian Army soldiers
- Evaldo da Silva (born 1958), Brazilian sprinter
