= Vandinho =

Vandinho may refer to:

- Vandinho (footballer, born 1978), Brazilian football midfielder Vanderson Válter de Almeida
- Vandinho (footballer, born 1980), Brazilian football attacking midfielder Vanderlei Bernardo Oliveira
- Vandinho (footballer, born August 1986), Brazilian football striker Vanderson da Silva Souza
- Vandinho (footballer, born September 1986), Brazilian football midfielder Vanderson Gomes Crisóstomo
- Vandinho (futsal player), Brazilian futsal winger Evandro Borges
