= Fábio Lopes =

Fábio Lopes may refer to:

- Fábio Lopes (footballer, born 1977) (Fábio Lopes Alcântara), Brazilian footballer
- Fábio Lopes (footballer, born 1985) (Fábio Rogério Correa Lopes), Brazilian footballer
- Fábio Lopes (footballer, born 1993) (Fábio Miguel Rico Lopes), Portuguese footballer
- Fábio Lopes (footballer, born 2001) (Fábio Jardel Veríssimo Lopes), Portuguese footballer
- Fabio Lopez, Italian football manager
