= Kadu =

Kadu, Kadú or KADU may refer to:

== People ==
- Kadu (footballer, born 1986), Brazilian football player
- Kadu (footballer, born 2005), Brazilian football player
- Kadú (Angolan footballer) (born 1994), Angolan football player
- Kadu Makrani (died 1878), Indian insurgent
- Jorge Kadú (born 1991), Cape Verdean football player
- Omprakash Babarao Kadu (born 1970), Indian politician

== Places ==
- Kadu Kuttai, India
- Kadu, Iran
- Kadu Sara, Iran

== Other uses ==
- Kadu language, of Myanmar
- Kadu languages of Sudan
- Kadu people of Burma
- Kenya African Democratic Union (KADU), Kenyan political party
- KADU, radio station in Minnesota, United States

== See also ==
- Kaadu (disambiguation)
- Kaddu
- Kaidu or Qaidu, (1230–1301), great-grandson of Genghis Khan
