= Erivelto =

Erivelto is a given name. It may refer to:

- Erivelto (footballer, born 1954), Brazilian football midfielder Erivélton Martins
- Erivelto (footballer, born 1982), Brazilian football forward Erivelto Alixandrino da Silva
- Erivelto (footballer, born 1988), Brazilian football forward Erivelto Emiliano da Silva

== See also ==
- Erivelton (disambiguation)
