= Amarildo (footballer, born 1999) =

Brazilian footballer

Personal information
- Full name: Amarildo Aparecido de Souza Junior
- Date of birth: 19 January 1999 (age 27)
- Place of birth: Paranavaí, Brazil
- Height: 1.82 m (6 ft 0 in)
- Position: Forward

Team information
- Current team: PVF-CAND
- Number: 99

Youth career
- Tanabi
- 2014–2016: São Paulo
- 2017–2018: Red Bull Brasil

Senior career*
Years	Team	Apps	(Gls)
2018–2020	Red Bull Brasil	3	(0)
2019	→ New York Red Bulls II (loan)	7	(1)
2020–2021	Maringá	8	(0)
2021	Caldense	9	(2)
2021–2024	Tombense	5	(0)
2021–2022	→ Famalicão (loan)	1	(0)
2022	→ Náutico (loan)	16	(2)
2023	→ Pouso Alegre (loan)	7	(0)
2023	→ Resende (loan)	9	(1)
2024	→ Ypiranga (loan)	11	(0)
2024–2025	The Cong–Viettel	21	(6)
2025–2026	PVF-CAND	12	(3)
- * Club domestic league appearances and goals as of 30 June 2026

Amarildo Aparecido de Souza Junior (born 19 January 1999), known simply as Amarildo, is a Brazilian professional footballer who plays for V.League 1 team PVF-CAND.

== Career ==
Amarildo began his career in the youth ranks of São Paulo. During March 2017 he signed with Red Bull Brasil joining the under 20 side. On 15 August 2018 Amarildo made his first team debut with Red Bull Brasil, appearing in a 1-0 victory over Noroeste in the Copa Paulista.

On 15 March 2019 Amarildo joined New York Red Bulls II on loan from Red Bull Brasil.

In July 2021, he joined Portuguese Primeira Liga club Famalicão.

In August 2024, Vietnamese side The Cong-Viettel announced their signature of Amarildo to the team.

== Career statistics ==
As of 20 March 2019

Club	Season	League		League Cup		Domestic Cup		Continental		Total	
Club	Season	Apps	Goals	Apps	Goals	Apps	Goals	Apps	Goals	Apps	Goals
Red Bull Brasil	2018	0	0	3	0	0	0	0	0	3	0
New York Red Bulls II (loan)	2019	0	0	0	0	0	0	0	0	0	0
Career total		0	0	3	0	0	0	0	0	3	0
