= Douglas Borel =

Brazilian footballer (born 2002)

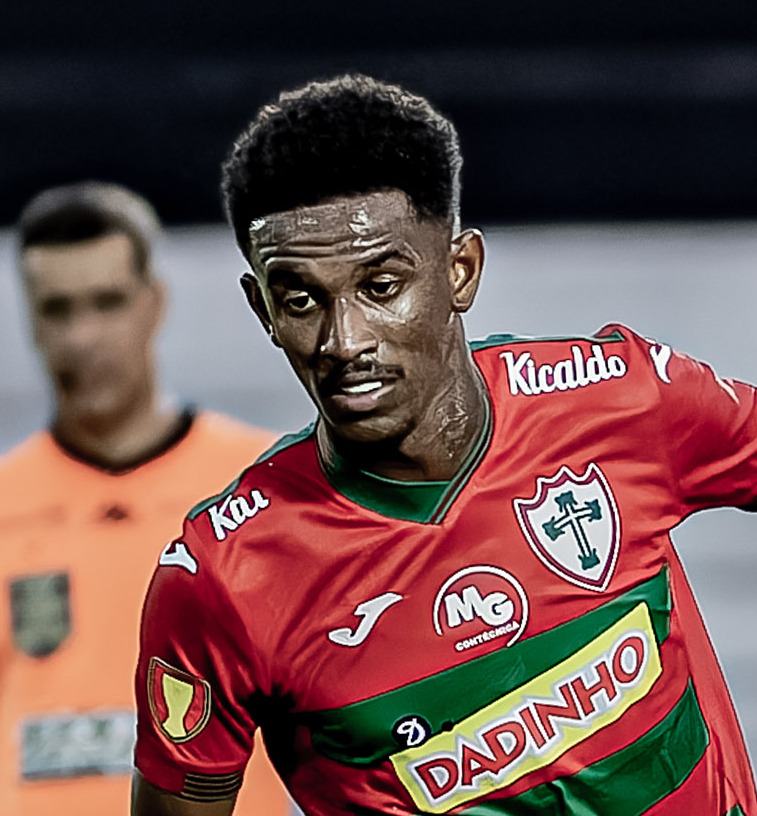
- Douglas Borel with Portuguesa in 2024

Personal information
- Full name: Douglas do Espírito Santos Torres
- Date of birth: 30 March 2002 (age 24)
- Place of birth: Camaçari, Brazil
- Height: 1.78 m (5 ft 10 in)
- Position: Right-back

Team information
- Current team: Penafiel (on loan from Santa Clara)
- Number: 7

Youth career
- 2014–2021: Bahia

Senior career*
Years	Team	Apps	(Gls)
2019–2024	Bahia	33	(1)
2023	→ Chapecoense (loan)	12	(0)
2024	→ Portuguesa (loan)	10	(1)
2024	→ Goiás (loan)	5	(0)
2025–	Santa Clara	0	(0)
2025–2026	→ Oliveirense (loan)	23	(1)
2026–	→ Penafiel (loan)	4	(0)
- * Club domestic league appearances and goals as of 12 September 2026

Douglas do Espírito Santos Torres (born 30 March 2002), commonly known as Douglas Borel, is a Brazilian professional footballer who plays as a right-back for Liga Portugal 2 club Penafiel on loan from Santa Clara.

== Career ==
Born in Camaçari, Bahia, Borel joined the youth sides of EC Bahia in 2014, aged 12. He made his first team debut at the age of 16 on 23 January 2019, coming on as a second-half substitute for Nino Paraíba in a 7–1 Campeonato Baiano home routing of Juazeirense.

After one further match, Borel returned to the under-20s, and renewed his contract until 2024 on 8 July 2021. He made his Série A debut on 24 October of that year, replacing Raí Nascimento in a 3–0 home win over Chapecoense; both sides finished the season in the relegation zone.

Definitely promoted to the main squad for the 2022 campaign, Borel scored his first senior goal on 15 April 2022, netting the winner in a 1–0 Série B away success over Náutico; he was later sent off in that match. On 3 April 2023, becoming a third-choice behind new signing Cicinho and fellow youth graduate André Dhominique, he was loaned to Chape for the remainder of the year.

On 21 December 2023, Borel was loaned to Portuguesa for the 2024 Campeonato Paulista.

On 1 July 2025, Borel moved to Portugal, signing a three-year contract with Primeira Liga club Santa Clara. Three weeks later, he was sent on a season-long loan to Liga Portugal 2 club Oliveirense.

== Career statistics ==
As of 18 March 2024

Club	Season	League			State league		Cup		Continental		Other		Total	
Club	Season	Division	Apps	Goals	Apps	Goals	Apps	Goals	Apps	Goals	Apps	Goals	Apps	Goals
Bahia	2019	Série A	0	0	2 (Note: Appearances in the Campeonato Baiano)	0	0	0	—		0	0	2	0
Bahia	2020	Série A	0	0	0	0	0	0	—		0	0	0	0
Bahia	2021	Série A	1	0	4	0	0	0	0	0	1 (Note: Appearances in the Copa do Nordeste)	0	6	0
Bahia	2022	Série B	15	1	7	0	4	0	—		8	0	34	1
Bahia	2023	Série A	0	0	4	0	0	0	—		4	0	8	0
Bahia	Total		16	1	17	0	4	0	0	0	13	0	50	1
Chapecoense (loan)	2023	Série B	12	0	—		—		—		—		12	0
Portuguesa (loan)	2024	Paulista	—		10	1	—		—		—		10	1
Career total			28	1	27	1	4	0	0	0	13	0	72	2

== Honours ==
Bahia

- Campeonato Baiano: 2019, 2023
- Copa do Nordeste: 2021
