= Naldo =

Naldo may refer to:

- Naldo (footballer, born 1976), Brazilian football striker Ednaldo da Conceição
- Naldo (footballer, born 1982), Brazilian football defender Ronaldo Aparecido Rodrigues
- Naldo (footballer, born 1988), Brazilian football defender Edinaldo Gomes Pereira
- Naldo (footballer, born 1990), Brazilian footballer Marinaldo dos Santos Oliveira
- Naldo (producer), reggaeton producer
- Naldo Benny, Brazilian recording artist
- Naldo Kwasie (born 1986), Surinamese footballer
