= List of storms named Fabio =

The name Fabio has been used for eight tropical cyclones in the East Pacific Ocean, replacing Fico on the naming lists:

- Hurricane Fabio (1982) – a Category 1 hurricane that stayed away from land
- Hurricane Fabio (1988) – a Category 4 hurricane that passed south of Hawaii but did not affect land
- Tropical Storm Fabio (1994) – a weak and short-lived storm that did not affect land
- Tropical Storm Fabio (2000) – a weak storm that did not affect land
- Tropical Storm Fabio (2006) – a short-lived storm that did not affect land while tropical, but its remnants affected Hawaii
- Hurricane Fabio (2012) – a Category 2 hurricane that did not affect land while tropical, but its remnants affected Baja California
- Hurricane Fabio (2018) – a Category 2 hurricane that did not affect land
- Tropical Storm Fabio (2024) – a short-lived storm that stayed far from land, its remnants were absorbed by nearby Tropical Storm Emilia

== See also ==
- Cyclone Favio (2007) – a South-West Indian Ocean tropical cyclone with a similar name
