= Fabinho =

Fabinho is a Portuguese given name, a diminutive form of the Portuguese name "little Fábio". Portuguese also has an augmentative form of the name, Fabão, "big Fábio".

== Brazilian football ==
- Fabinho (footballer, born 1970), former midfielder Fábio da Silva Azevedo
- Fabinho Santos (born 1973), football manager and former midfielder Fábio José dos Santos
- Fabinho (footballer, born 1974), former forward Fabio Augusto Justino
- Fabinho (footballer, born 1975), football manager and former defender Fábio de Souza
- Fabinho (footballer, born 1976), former defensive midfielder Fábio de Jesus
- Fabinho (footballer, born 1977), former forward Fábio Trinidade da Silveira
- Fabinho (footballer, born 1980), former midfielder Fábio Alves Félix
- Fabinho Recife (born 1982), former forward Fabiano Aguiar Dionizio Laurentino
- Fabinho (footballer, born 1982), former midfielder Fábio de Matos Pereira
- Fabinho (footballer, born 1983), forward Fabio Souza dos Santos
- Fabinho Capixaba (born 1983), former right-back Antônio Fábio Francês Cavalcante
- Fabinho (footballer, born 1984), midfielder Fábio Augusto Machado
- Fabinho (footballer, born 1985), former left-back Fábio Alves Macedo
- Fabinho (footballer, born 1986), defensive midfielder Fábio Gonçalves
- Fabinho Alves (born 1986), striker Fábio da Silva Alves
- Fabinho (footballer, born 1991), forward Fábio Ayres
- Fabinho (footballer, born 1992), forward Fabio da Silva Santos
- Fabinho (footballer, born 1993), defensive midfielder Fábio Henrique Tavares
- Fabinho (footballer, born 1996), central midfielder Fábio Alexander Freitas de Almeida
- Fabinho (footballer, born 1999), midfielder Fabio Augusto Luciano da Silva
- Fabinho (footballer, born 2002), midfielder Fábio Silva de Freitas

== Other football ==
- Fabinho Azevedo (1977–2018), Brazilian-born Togolese former forward Fábio Pereira de Azevedo
- Fábio Baptista (born 2001), Portuguese football player
- Fabinho Martins (born 1996), Portuguese midfielder Fábio Alexandre Cruz Martins

== Futsal ==
- Fábio Lima (futsal player) (born 1988), Portuguese futsal player
