= Fabius, West Virginia =

Unincorporated community in West Virginia, United States

- Unincorporated community
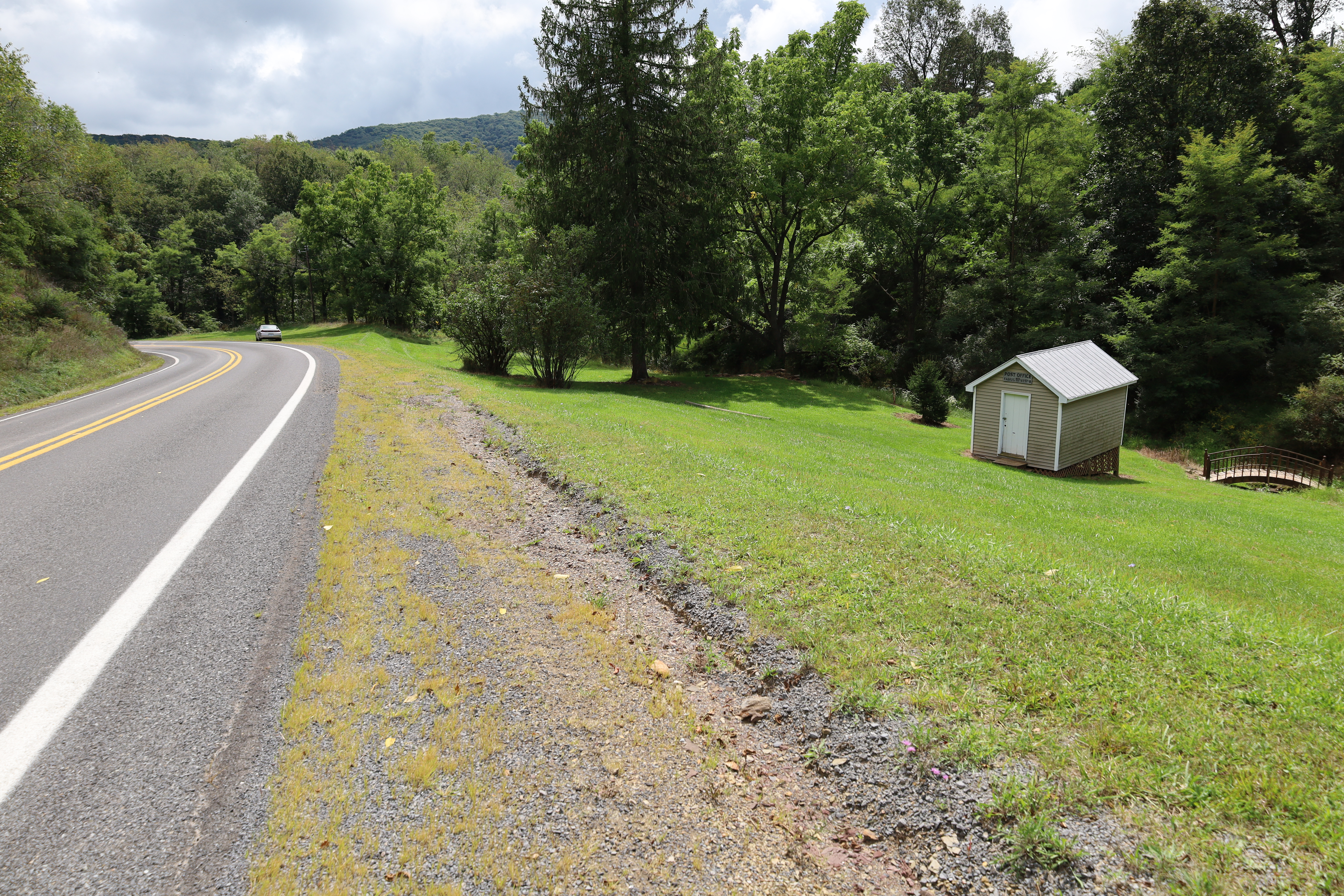

- Location within West Virginia Location within the United States
- Coordinates: 39°5′38″N 78°50′12″W
- Country: United States
- State: West Virginia
- County: Hardy
- Elevation: 2,093 ft (638 m)
- Time zone: UTC-5 (Eastern (EST))
  - Summer (DST): UTC-4 (EDT)
- GNIS ID: 1556835

Fabius was an unincorporated community in Hardy County, West Virginia, United States.

The name Fabius supposedly is the English translation from Latin of the first name of Peter Bean, an early settler.
