= Zeze =

Zeze or Zezé may refer to:

== People ==
=== Nickname ===
- Zezé (footballer, 1899-unknown), Brazilian football winger José Carlos Guimarães
- Zézé (footballer, 1942-2006), Brazilian football forward José Gilson Rodriguez
- Zezé (footballer, 1957-2008), Brazilian football centre-forward Antônio José da Silva Gouveia
- Zézé (basketball) (born 1966), full name Maria José Bertolotti, Brazilian basketball player
- Zezé Assis (1962-2007), Angolan basketball player
- Zézé Gamboa (born 1955), Angolan filmmaker
- Zezé Gonzaga (1926-2008), Brazilian singer and entertainer
- Zezé Macedo (1916-1999), Brazilian comedienne and actress
- Zezé Moreira (1917-1998), Brazilian footballer and football manager
- Zezé Motta (born 1944), Brazilian actress and singer
- Zezé Perrella (born 1956), Brazilian politician
- Zezé Polessa (born 1953), Brazilian actress
- Zezé Procópio (1913-1980), Brazilian football midfielder

=== Surname ===
- Anderson Lago Zeze (born 1989), Ivorian football midfielder
- Méba-Mickaël Zeze (born 1994), French sprinter
- Ryan Zeze (born 1998), French athlete
- Takahisa Zeze (born 1960), Japanese film director and screenwriter
- Venance Zézé (born 1981), Ivorian football midfielder

=== Stage name ===
- Zezé Di Camargo (born 1963), Brazilian singer, half of the Zezé Di Camargo & Luciano musical duo
- Zeze Millz (born 1989), English media personality

== Places ==
- Zeze Castle, a Japanese castle
- Zeze Domain, a Japanese feudal domain

== Music ==
- Zeze (instrument), an African stringed instrument
- "Zeze" (song), a 2018 rap song by Kodak Black
- "Zezé", a song from the 2015 EP Chat-Shire by IU

== Other uses ==
- Zeze ware, a type of Japanese pottery
- Zezé (novel), a 1909 novel by Ángeles Vicente
- Zeze Station, a Japanese railway station in Ōtsu
- Zeze High School, a Japanese high school

== See also ==
- Zizi, a name with a similar spelling and pronunciation to Zeze
