= Fábio Santos (footballer, born 1998) =

Portuguese footballer

Personal information
- Full name: Fábio Alexandre Jesus Santos
- Date of birth: 25 July 1998 (age 28)
- Place of birth: Faro, Portugal
- Height: 1.70 m (5 ft 7 in)
- Position: Right-back

Team information
- Current team: Imortal
- Number: 16

Youth career
- 2007–2009: Farense
- 2009–2011: Geração Génios
- 2011–2017: Farense

Senior career*
Years	Team	Apps	(Gls)
2016–2019	Farense	11	(0)
2019–2020	Sacavenense	11	(0)
2020	Fátima	5	(0)
2020–2021	Moura	6	(1)
2021	Ayamonte	12	(0)
2021	Cartaya	14	(0)
2022	Ayamonte	15	(1)
2022–2023	Esperança de Lagos	18	(0)
2023–	Imortal	22	(1)
- * Club domestic league appearances and goals as of 18:49, 16 June 2024 (UTC)

Fábio Alexandre Jesus Santos (born 25 July 1998) is a Portuguese professional footballer who plays for Imortal as a right-back.

== Club career ==
He made his LigaPro debut for Farense on 3 March 2019 in a game against Cova da Piedade.
