= Nonato =

Nonato is a name, the Portuguese and Spanish equivalent to the Latin Nonnatus, generally related to Saint Raymond Nonnatus. It may refer to:

- Nonato (footballer, born 1967), Brazilian football left back Raimundo Nonato da Silva
- Nonato (footballer, born 1979), Brazilian football forward Raimundo Nonato de Lima Ribeiro
- Nonato (footballer, born 1998), Brazilian football midfielder Gustavo Nonato Santana
- Nonato (Paralympic footballer), blind footballer Raimundo Nonato Alves Mendes
