= Neguete =

Neguete may refer to the following footballers:

- Neguete (footballer, born 1987), Brazilian centre-back Rodrigo Santos Silva
- Neguete (footballer, born 1990), Brazilian centre-back Vinícius Lopes Laurindo
- Neguette, Brazilian centre-back Anderson da Silva de Jesus (born 1977)
