= Juanín (footballer, born 1937) =

Spanish footballer

Personal information
- Full name: Juan Antonio Rodríguez Duflox
- Date of birth: 10 January 1937 (age 89)
- Place of birth: San Sebastián, Spain
- Position: Midfielder

Senior career*
Years	Team	Apps	(Gls)
1948–1953	Real Sociedad	26	(1)
Total		26	(1)
- * Club domestic league appearances and goals

Juan Antonio Rodríguez Duflox (born 10 January 1937), known as Juanín, is a Spanish former professional footballer who played as a midfielder.

== Career ==
Born in San Sebastián, Juanín played for Real Sociedad.
