= Fábio (footballer, born October 1984) =

Brazilian footballer

Personal information
- Full name: José Fábio da Silva
- Date of birth: October 8, 1984 (age 42)
- Place of birth: Ribeirão Preto, Brazil
- Height: 1.70 m (5 ft 7 in)
- Position: Right back

Team information
- Current team: Gama

Youth career
- 2004: Grêmio Barueri

Senior career*
Years	Team	Apps	(Gls)
2005–2007	Flamengo	9	(1)
2007	→ Ituano (Loan)		
2008	Bahia		
2009–2011	Americana	9	(0)
2010	→ Veranópolis (Loan)		
2010	→ Central (Loan)	5	(3)
2011–	Gama	5	(1)
- * Club domestic league appearances and goals

José Fábio da Silva or simply Fábio (born October 8, 1984, in Ribeirão-PE), is a Brazilian right back. He currently plays for Sociedade Esportiva do Gama.

== Honours ==
Flamengo

- Copa do Brasil: 2006
- Copa Record Rio de Futebol: 2005

== Contract ==
- Ituano (Loan) 1 June 2007 to 30 November 2007
- Flamengo 10 February 2004 to 31 December 2007
