= Fantick (footballer, born 1977) =

Brazilian footballer

Personal information
- Full name: Márcio Delvi da Costa
- Date of birth: 22 April 1977 (age 49)
- Place of birth: Florianópolis, Brazil
- Height: 1.72 m (5 ft 8 in)
- Position: Forward

Youth career
- 1993–1997: Avaí

Senior career*
Years	Team	Apps	(Gls)
1996–2002	Avaí		
2001	→ Etti Jundiaí (loan)		
2002–2003	América (MEX)		
2003	Avaí		
2004	Caxias		
2005–2007	Joinville		
2007–2008	Criciúma		
2009	Marcílio Dias		
2009–2010	Joinville		
- * Club domestic league appearances and goals as of 5 December 2024

Márcio Delvi da Costa (born 22 April 1977), better known as Fantick, is a Brazilian former professional footballer who played as a forward.

== Career ==
Revealed by Avaí youth sectors, Fantick played for the club from 1996 to 2002, and was part of the Serie C champion squad in 1998. At the end of 2002 he was traded to Club America, returning to Avaí in August 2003. He also played by SER Caxias, Joinville, Criciúma and Marcílio Dias.

== Honours ==
Avaí

- Campeonato Brasileiro Série C: 1998

Joinville

- Campeonato Catarinense Série B: 2005, 2006
