= Fábio (footballer, born 1983) =

Brazilian footballer

Personal information
- Full name: Fábio Gilvan do Nascimento Silva
- Date of birth: 13 September 1983 (age 43)
- Place of birth: Recife, Brazil
- Height: 1.74 m (5 ft 9 in)
- Position: Striker

Senior career*
Years	Team	Apps	(Gls)
2005	Nacional (Patos)		
2006	Sport Recife		
2007	Mogi Mirim		
2007	Varteks	10	(2)
2008	FK Vardar	4	(0)
2008–2010	FK Rabotnički	35	(6)
2011	FK Vardar	12	(2)
2012	Porto de Caruaru	6	(0)
2013	Pesqueira FC	2	(0)
- * Club domestic league appearances and goals

Fábio Gilvan do Nascimento Silva (born 13 September 1983), known simply as Fábio, is a Brazilian former footballer.
