= Fábio Felix =

Brazilian politician (born 1985)

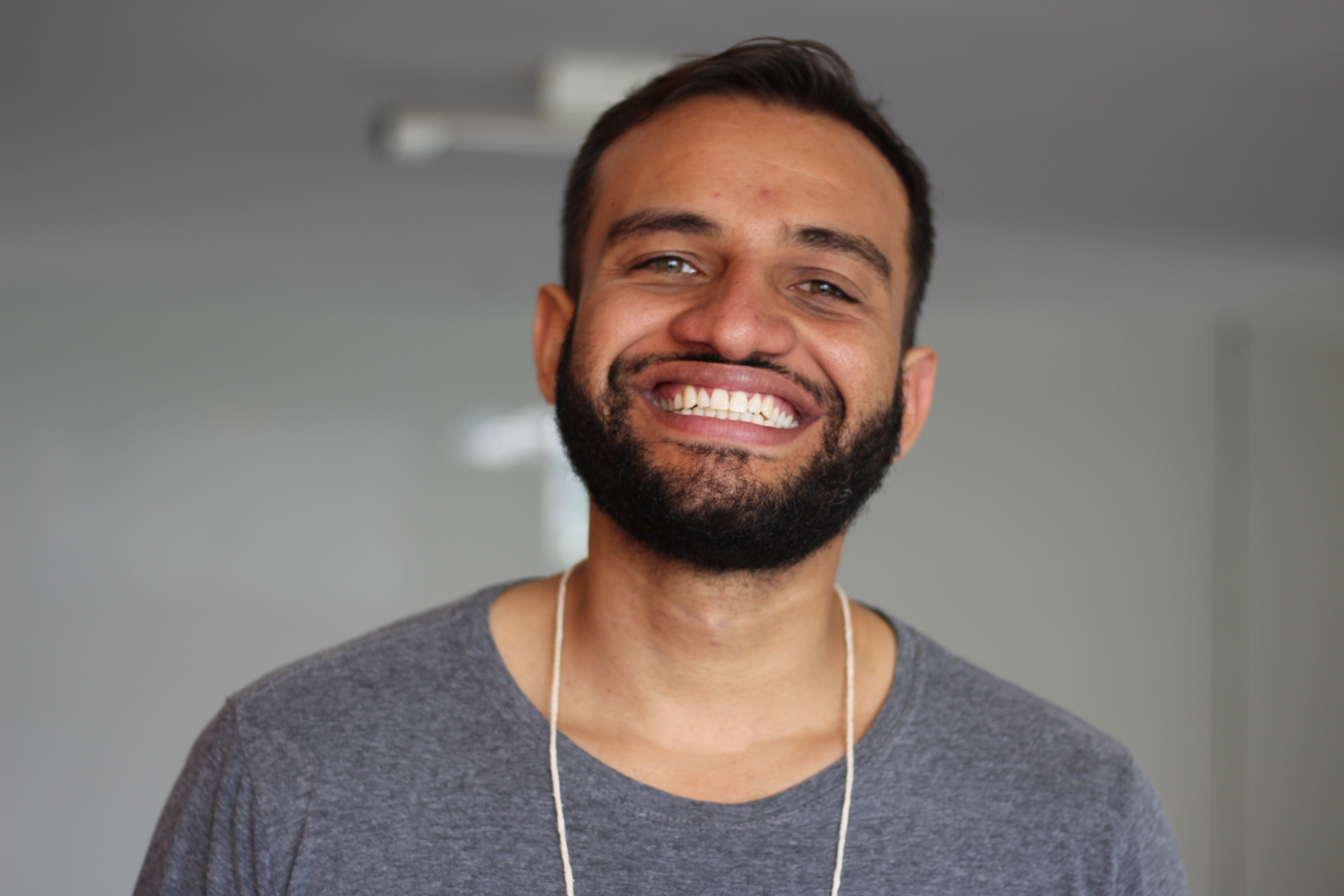
- Felix in 2017

Member-elect of the Chamber of Deputies
- Assuming office 1 February 2027
- Constituency: Federal District

Member of the Legislative Chamber of the Federal District
- Incumbent
- Assumed office 1 January 2019
- Constituency: At-large

Personal details
- Born: Fábio Félix Silveira; 20 December 1985 (age 40) Brasília, Federal District, Brazil
- Party: PSOL (since 2005)
- Education: University of Brasília
- Profession: Social assistant

Fábio Felix Silveira (born 20 December 1985) is a Brazilian politician who was elected member of the Chamber of Deputies in 2026. He has been a member of the Legislative Chamber of the Federal District since 2019.
