= Fábio (footballer, born March 1984) =

Brazilian footballer

Personal information
- Full name: Fábio Souza de Oliveira
- Date of birth: 14 March 1984 (age 42)
- Place of birth: Campo Grande, Brazil
- Height: 1.73 m (5 ft 8 in)
- Position: Striker

Youth career
- 2003: Goiás

Senior career*
Years	Team	Apps	(Gls)
2004–2007	Goiás	38	(1)
- * Club domestic league appearances and goals

Fábio Souza de Oliveira (born 14 March 1984), known as Fábio, is a Brazilian former professional footballer who played as a striker.
