= Fantick (footballer, born 1955) =

Brazilian footballer (1955–2024)

Personal information
- Full name: Francisco de Assis dos Santos
- Date of birth: 16 October 1955
- Place of birth: São Luís, Brazil
- Date of death: 1 November 2024 (aged 69)
- Place of death: Araraquara, Brazil
- Position: Left-back

Senior career*
Years	Team	Apps	(Gls)
1973–1978	Botafogo-PB		
1978–1979	Comercial-SP		
1980–1982	Portuguesa	112	(2)
1983	Avaí		
1984	Catuense		
1985	Comercial-SP		
1986	Taquaritinga		
1987–1989	Comercial-SP		
1990	Fernandópolis		
1991	Matonense		
1992	São Bento		
1992	São Caetano		
1993	Matonense		
1994	São Caetano		
- * Club domestic league appearances and goals

Francisco de Assis dos Santos (16 October 1955 – 1 November 2024), better known as Fantick, was a Brazilian professional footballer who played as a left-back.

== Career ==
Revealed by Botafogo-PB, Fantick stood out by becoming four-time state champion with the club. He later arrived in football in São Paulo where he played for Comercial-SP and Portuguesa, where he played 112 matches. Fantick also had spells at Matonense, Avaí, Catuense, São Bento, Taquaritinga, Fernandópolis and São Caetano.

After retiring as a player, Fantick worked as a coach in youth sectors at Matonense and Ferroviária, in addition to creating his own football school.

== Death ==
Fantick died of pancreatic cancer in the city of Araraquara, on 1 November 2024, at the age of 69.

== Honours ==
Botafogo-PB

- Campeonato Paraibano: 1975, 1976, 1977, 1978
