= Nandinho (futsal player) =

Portuguese futsal player

Personal information
- Full name: Fernando Manuel Silva Leal
- Date of birth: 18 December 1982 (age 43)
- Place of birth: Porto, Portugal
- Height: 1.78 m (5 ft 10 in)
- Position: Winger

Team information
- Current team: São Martinho de Mouros
- Number: 25

Youth career
- 1993–1996: Sporting São Vítor (football)
- 1996–1997: Vilanovense FC (football)
- 1997–1998: CD Portugal (football)
- 1999–2001: Miragaia

Senior career*
Years	Team	Apps	(Gls)
2001–2004	Coimbrões		
2004–2009	Alpendorada		
2009–2013	Modicus Sandim		
2013	Yenakiievets Yenakiieve		
2014	Modicus Sandim		
2014–2015	Boavista		
2015–2018	Futsal Azeméis		
2018	Imperial Wet		
2018–2019	Futsal Silva		
2019–2020	FC Semailles		
2020–	São Martinho de Mouros		

International career^{‡}
2002	Portugal B	1	(0)
2012	Portugal	11	(3)
- * Club domestic league appearances and goals as of 00:00, 12 October 2018 (UTC) ‡ National team caps and goals as of 00:00, 12 October 2018 (UTC)

Fernando Manuel Silva Leal (born 18 December 1982), commonly known as Nandinho, is a Portuguese futsal player who plays as a winger for São Martinho de Mouros and the Portugal national team.
