= Giva (footballer, born 1999) =

Brazilian footballer

Personal information
- Full name: Geovane Silva Santos
- Date of birth: 22 February 1999 (age 27)
- Place of birth: Mineiros, Brazil
- Height: 1.78 m (5 ft 10 in)
- Position: Midfielder

Youth career
- –2019: Athletico Paranaense

Senior career*
Years	Team	Apps	(Gls)
2019–2021	Athletico Paranaense	6	(0)
2019–2020	→ Inter de Limeira (loan)	12	(0)
2020–2021	→ Figueirense (loan)	11	(0)
2021–2022	CSA	53	(2)
2023	Avaí	12	(2)
- * Club domestic league appearances and goals as of 8 July 2023

Geovane Silva Santos (born 22 February 1999), simply known as Giva, is a Brazilian footballer who plays as a midfielder.

== Career statistics ==
=== Club ===
As of 30 March 2021.

Club	Season	League			State league		Cup		Continental		Other		Total	
Club	Season	Division	Apps	Goals	Apps	Goals	Apps	Goals	Apps	Goals	Apps	Goals	Apps	Goals
Athletico Paranaense	2019	Série A	0	0	0	0	0	0	—		—		0	0
Athletico Paranaense	2020	Série A	0	0	0	0	0	0	—		—		0	0
Athletico Paranaense	2021	Série A	0	0	0	0	0	0	—		—		0	0
Athletico Paranaense	Total		0	0	0	0	0	0	—		—		0	0
Inter de Limeira (loan)	2019	Paulista A2	—		0	0	—		—		3 (Note: Appearances in the Copa Paulista)	0	3	0
Inter de Limeira (loan)	2020	Paulista	—		12	0	—		—		0	0	12	0
Inter de Limeira (loan)	Total		—		12	0	—		—		3	0	15	0
Figueirense (loan)	2020	Série B	10	0	—		—		—		—		10	0
Career total			10	0	12	0	0	0	0	0	3	0	25	0
