= Gounghin =

Gounghin is the name of several settlements in Burkina Faso. It may refer to:

- Gounghin, Gounghin, the capital of Gounghin Department, Kouritenga Province
- Gounghin, a district of Ouagadougou, the capital of Burkina Faso
- Gounghin, Ganzourgou, a village in Boudry Department, Ganzourgou Province
- Gounghin-Grand, a village in Bissiga Department, Boulgou Province
- Gounghin-Petit, a village in Bissiga Department, Boulgou Province
