= Bado =

Bado may refer to:

== People ==
- Bado (cartoonist), a Canadian cartoonist
- Joris Bado, a Burkinabé professional basketball player

== Religion ==
- Bado, a religious ceremony in Dogon religion

== Places ==
- Ələsgərli, Shamkir, a village in Azerbaijan formerly called Bado (or Badakand)
- Bado, Burkina Faso, a village in Burkina Faso
- Bado, Missouri, a community in the United States
