= Diarra (disambiguation) =

Diarra is a given name and surname. Diarra may also refer to:

- Diarra, Burkina Faso, village in the Béguédo Department of Boulgou Province, south-eastern Burkina Faso
- Diarra, Mali, small town and commune in Mali
- Kingdom of Diarra, a former state in what is now northwestern Mali

== See also ==
- Diara railway station, Kolkata Suburban Railway Station, India
- Diarra-Betongo, village in the Zonsé Department of Boulgou Province, south-eastern Burkina Faso
