= Gozi (disambiguation) =

Gozi is a town in Burkina Faso. It may also refer to:

== People ==
- Federico Gozi (fl.c.1629–1634), Sammarinese politician
- Giuliano Gozi (1894–1955), Sammarinese Fascist leader
- Sandro Gozi (born 1968), Italian politician

== Other uses ==
- Gozi, Iran (a.k.a. Jazin, Fars), an Iranian village
- Gozi (Trojan horse), a computer spyware program

== See also ==
- Goza (disambiguation)
- Gozo
