= Loanga, Tenkodogo =

Coordinates: 11.7329°N 0.3984°W

Loanga Louanga
- Interactive map of Loanga
- Country: Burkina Faso
- Region: Centre-Est Region
- Province: Boulgou Province
- Department: Tenkodogo Department

Population (2019)
  - Total: 2,596

Loanga is a town in the Tenkodogo Department of Boulgou Province in south-eastern Burkina Faso.

Loanga is approximately 20 km from the department capital of Tenkodogo. The economy is mainly based on animal husbandry.

Population
Year	Pop.	±%
1985	2,901	—
2006	3,139	+8.2%
2019	2,596	−17.3%
