= Sampa =

Sampa may refer to:

== Linguistics ==
- Speech Assessment Methods Phonetic Alphabet, for European languages
- X-SAMPA, an international variant

== People ==
- Sampa the Great (born 1993), Zambian-born Australian singer-songwriter and rapper
- Nsofwa Petronella Sampa (born c. 1992), Zambian HIV activist and clinical psychological counselor

== Places ==
- Sampa, Burkina Faso
- Sampa, Ghana
- Sampa, a nickname for São Paulo, Brazil

== Other uses ==
- "Sampa", a song by Caetano Veloso on the 1978 album Muito (Dentro da Estrela Azulada)
- South African Modern Pentathlon Association

== See also ==
- Tsampa, a Tibetan and Himalayan staple foodstuff
