= Kabri =

Kabri may refer to:

- Tel Kabri, a primarily Bronze Age archaeological site - located on the kibbutz below - notable for its palace.
- Kabri, Israel, kibbutz in Israel
- Al-Kabri, Palestinian village, depopulated in 1948 after the al-Kabri massacre
- Kabri, Burkina Faso, village in Burkina Faso
- Kabri, India, village in India
