= Goghin =

Goghin may refer to:

- Goghin, Bazèga, Burkina Faso
- Goghin, Boulgou, Burkina Faso
- Goghin, Ganzourgou, Burkina Faso
