= Dimvousse =

- Country: Burkina Faso
- Region: Centre-Est Region
- Province: Boulgou Province
- Department: Zonsé Department

Population (2019)
  - Total: 1,892

Dimvousse is a town in the Zonsé Department of Boulgou Province in south-eastern Burkina Faso.

Population
Year	Pop.	±%
1985	274	—
2006	1,102	+302.2%
2019	1,892	+71.7%
