= Malenga-Yarce =

- Country: Burkina Faso
- Region: Centre-Est Region
- Province: Boulgou Province
- Department: Tenkodogo Department

Population (2019)
  - Total: 2,000

Malenga-Yarce is a town in the Tenkodogo Department of Boulgou Province in south-eastern Burkina Faso.

Population
| Year | Pop. | ±% |
|---|---|---|
| 1985 | 712 | — |
| 2006 | 1,228 | +72.5% |
| 2019 | 2,000 | +62.9% |
