= Saoupo =

- Country: Burkina Faso
- Region: Centre-Est Region
- Province: Boulgou Province
- Department: Zonsé Department

Population (2019)
  - Total: 1,015

Saoupo is a village in the Zonsé Department of Boulgou Province in south-eastern Burkina Faso. This village is known for the annual festival on water management.

Population
Year	Pop.	±%
1985	418	—
2006	613	+46.7%
2019	1,015	+65.6%
