= Loukou-Peulh =

- Country: Burkina Faso
- Region: Centre-Est Region
- Province: Boulgou Province
- Department: Tenkodogo Department

Population (2019)
  - Total: 127

Loukou-Peulh is a village in the Tenkodogo Department of Boulgou Province in south-eastern Burkina Faso.

Population
Year	Pop.	±%
1985	67	—
2006	65	−3.0%
2019	127	+95.4%
