= Vag-Vaguin =

- Country: Burkina Faso
- Region: Centre-Est Region
- Province: Boulgou Province
- Department: Tenkodogo Department

Population (2019)
  - Total: 2,012

Vag-Vaguin is a town in the Tenkodogo Department of Boulgou Province in south-eastern Burkina Faso.

Population
Year	Pop.	±%
1985	902	—
2006	1,471	+63.1%
2019	2,012	+36.8%
