= Boutaya =

- Country: Burkina Faso
- Region: Centre-Est Region
- Province: Boulgou Province
- Department: Zonsé Department

Population (2019)
  - Total: 846

Boutaya is a village in the Zonsé Department of Boulgou Province in south-eastern Burkina Faso.

Population
Year	Pop.	±%
1985	813	—
2006	721	−11.3%
2019	846	+17.3%
