= Bourma De Zoaga =

- Village
- Country: Burkina Faso
- Region: Centre-Est Region
- Province: Boulgou Province
- Department: Zoaga Department

Population (2019)
  - Total: 941

Bourma De Zoaga is a village in the Zoaga Department of Boulgou Province in south-eastern Burkina Faso.

Population
Year	Pop.	±%
1985	411	—
2006	638	+55.2%
2019	941	+47.5%
