= Karema =

Karema may refer to:

- Karema, Burkina Faso, a village in the Bané Department of Boulgou Province in south-eastern Burkina Faso
- Karima, Sudan, a town in Northern State in Sudan some 400 km from Khartoum
- Karema, Tanzania, a former mission station in Tanzania
