= Oueloghin =

Oueloghin Ouelegue
- Country: Burkina Faso
- Region: Centre-Est Region
- Province: Boulgou Province
- Department: Tenkodogo Department

Population (2019)
  - Total: 2,526

Oueloghin or Oueloguin is a town in the Tenkodogo Department of Boulgou Province in south-eastern Burkina Faso.

Population
Year	Pop.	±%
1985	744	—
2006	2,178	+192.7%
2019	2,526	+16.0%
