= Belgue =

- Country: Burkina Faso
- Region: Centre-Est Region
- Province: Boulgou Province
- Department: Garango Department

Population (2019)
  - Total: 748

Belgue is a village in the Garango Department of Boulgou Province in south-eastern Burkina Faso.

Population
Year	Pop.	±%
1985	485	—
2006	636	+31.1%
2019	748	+17.6%
