= Dega, Burkina Faso =

Dega
- Country: Burkina Faso
- Region: Centre-Est Region
- Province: Boulgou Province
- Department: Komtoèga Department

Population (2019)
  - Total: 1,862

Dega is a town in the Komtoèga Department of Boulgou Province in south-eastern Burkina Faso.

Population
Year	Pop.	±%
1985	982	—
2006	2,148	+118.7%
2019	1,862	−13.3%
