= Koukoadore =

Koukoadore Koukoadoure
- Country: Burkina Faso
- Region: Centre-Est Region
- Province: Boulgou Province
- Department: Zoaga Department

Population (2019)
  - Total: 380

Koukoadore is a village in the Zoaga Department of Boulgou Province in south-eastern Burkina Faso.

Population
Year	Pop.	±%
1985	130	—
2006	434	+233.8%
2019	380	−12.4%
