= Zerboko =

Zerboko Zebogo
- Country: Burkina Faso
- Region: Centre-Est Region
- Province: Boulgou Province
- Department: Zoaga Department

Population (2019)
  - Total: 854

Zerboko is a village in the Zoaga Department of Boulgou Province in south-eastern Burkina Faso.

Population
Year	Pop.	±%
1985	167	—
2006	336	+101.2%
2019	854	+154.2%
