= Benna, Burkina Faso =

Benna
- Country: Burkina Faso
- Region: Centre-Est Region
- Province: Boulgou Province
- Department: Bissiga Department

Population (2019)
  - Total: 3,482

Benna is a town in the Bissiga Department of Boulgou Province in south-eastern Burkina Faso.

Population
Year	Pop.	±%
1985	850	—
2006	2,241	+163.6%
2019	3,482	+55.4%
