= Gouni-Peulh =

Coordinates: 11.6377°N 0.3707°W

- Interactive map of Gouni-Peulh
- Country: Burkina Faso
- Region: Centre-Est Region
- Province: Boulgou Province
- Department: Tenkodogo Department

Population (2019)
  - Total: 187

Gouni-Peulh is a village in the Tenkodogo Department of Boulgou Province in south-eastern Burkina Faso.

Population
Year	Pop.	±%
1985	861	—
2006	487	−43.4%
2019	187	−61.6%
