= Cella, Burkina Faso =

Coordinates: 11°37′N 0°22′W

Cella
- Interactive map of Cella
- Country: Burkina Faso
- Region: Centre-Est Region
- Province: Boulgou Province
- Department: Tenkodogo Department

Population (2019)
  - Total: 1,984

Cella is a town in the Tenkodogo Department of Boulgou Province in south-eastern Burkina Faso.

Population
Year	Pop.	±%
1985	3,489	—
2006	1,986	−43.1%
2019	1,984	−0.1%
