= Bangagou =

- Country: Burkina Faso
- Region: Centre-Est Region
- Province: Boulgou Province
- Department: Boussouma Department

Population (2019)
  - Total: 2,878

Bangagou is a town in the Boussouma Department of Boulgou Province in south-eastern Burkina Faso.

Population
Year	Pop.	±%
1985	2,562	—
2006	2,079	−18.9%
2019	2,878	+38.4%
