= Oueguedo =

Coordinates: 11.8342°N 0.4127°W

- Interactive map of Oueguedo
- Country: Burkina Faso
- Region: Centre-Est Region
- Province: Boulgou Province
- Department: Tenkodogo Department

Population (2019)
  - Total: 1,589

Oueguedo is a town in the Tenkodogo Department of Boulgou Province in south-eastern Burkina Faso.

Population
Year	Pop.	±%
1985	724	—
2006	1,366	+88.7%
2019	1,589	+16.3%
