= Zamboundi =

- Country: Burkina Faso
- Region: Centre-Est Region
- Province: Boulgou Province
- Department: Bissiga Department

Population (2019)
  - Total: 278

Zamboundi is a village in the Bissiga Department of Boulgou Province in southeastern Burkina Faso.

Population
Year	Pop.	±%
2006	244	—
2019	278	+13.9%
