= Komtoega-Peulh =

- Country: Burkina Faso
- Region: Centre-Est Region
- Province: Boulgou Province
- Department: Komtoèga Department

Population (2019)
  - Total: 730

Komtoega-Peulh is a village in the Komtoèga Department of Boulgou Province in south-eastern Burkina Faso.

Population
Year	Pop.	±%
1985	612	—
2006	960	+56.9%
2019	730	−24.0%
