= Koulbako =

- Country: Burkina Faso
- Region: Centre-Est Region
- Province: Boulgou Province
- Department: Bissiga Department

Population (2019)
  - Total: 1,925

Koulbako is a village in the Bissiga Department of Boulgou Province in south-eastern Burkina Faso.

Population
Year	Pop.	±%
1985	717	—
2006	1,276	+78.0%
2019	1,925	+50.9%
