= Ouaregou =

Coordinates: 11°48′N 0°42′W

Ouarégou
- Interactive map of Ouarégou
- Country: Burkina Faso
- Region: Centre-Est Region
- Province: Boulgou Province
- Department: Garango Department

Population (2019)
  - Total: 3,126

Ouarégou is a town in the Garango Department of Boulgou Province in south-eastern Burkina Faso.

Ouarégou is a canton with 15 villages :

1. Ouarégou-Center

2. Bangoula

3. Dissiam

4. Ouarégou-Peulh

5. Topra

6. Gozére

7. Kouassagou

8. Bangou

9. Saregou

10.Tengsoba

11.Tourla

12.Kienga

13.Mogao

14. Gnabtenga

15.Wanga

Population
Year	Pop.	±%
1985	5,432	—
2006	9,775	+80.0%
2019	3,126	−68.0%
