= Siguinvoussé =

Siguinvoussé may refer to several places in Burkina Faso:

- Siguinvoussé, Absouya, a village in Absouya Department, Boulgou Province, Centre-Est Region
- Siguinvoussé, Garango, a village in Garango Department, Boulgou Province, Centre-Est Region
- Siguinvoussé, Sabcé, a village in Sabcé Department, Bam Province, Centre-Nord Region
- Siguinvoussé, Yé, a village in Yé Department, Nayala Province, Boucle du Mouhoun Region
- Siguinvoussé, Zimtenga, a village in Zimtenga Department, Bam Province, Centre-Nord Region
