= Zigla-Polace =

- Interactive map of Zigla-Polace
- Country: Burkina Faso
- Region: Centre-Est Region
- Province: Boulgou Province
- Department: Garango Department

Population (2019)
  - Total: 4,061

Zigla-Polace is a town in the Garango Department of Boulgou Province in south-eastern Burkina Faso.

Population
Year	Pop.	±%
1985	3,571	—
2006	2,965	−17.0%
2019	4,061	+37.0%
