= Zaka, Tenkodogo =

Zaka
- Country: Burkina Faso
- Region: Centre-Est Region
- Province: Boulgou Province
- Department: Tenkodogo Department

Population (2019)
  - Total: 1,281

Zaka is a village in the Tenkodogo Department of Boulgou Province in south-eastern Burkina Faso.

Population
Year	Pop.	±%
1985	538	—
2006	849	+57.8%
2019	1,281	+50.9%
