= Sabtenga =

- Interactive map of Sabtenga
- Country: Burkina Faso
- Region: Centre-Est Region
- Province: Boulgou Province
- Department: Tenkodogo Department

Population (2019)
  - Total: 2,933

Sabtenga is a town in the Tenkodogo Department of Boulgou Province in south-eastern Burkina Faso.

Population
| Year | Pop. | ±% |
|---|---|---|
| 1985 | 3,615 | — |
| 2006 | 5,076 | +40.4% |
| 2019 | 2,933 | −42.2% |
