= Samprabissa =

- Country: Burkina Faso
- Region: Centre-Est Region
- Province: Boulgou Province
- Department: Zonsé Department

Population (2019)
  - Total: 160

Samprabissa is a village in the Zonsé Department of Boulgou Province in south-eastern Burkina Faso.

Population
| Year | Pop. | ±% |
|---|---|---|
| 1985 | 72 | — |
| 2006 | 99 | +37.5% |
| 2019 | 160 | +61.6% |
