= Koumbore =

Koumbore Kombore
- Country: Burkina Faso
- Region: Centre-Est Region
- Province: Boulgou Province
- Department: Boussouma Department

Population (2019)
  - Total: 2,069

Koumbore is a town in the Boussouma Department of Boulgou Province in south-eastern Burkina Faso.

Population
| Year | Pop. | ±% |
|---|---|---|
| 1985 | 878 | — |
| 2006 | 1,707 | +94.4% |
| 2019 | 2,069 | +21.2% |
