= Ibogo =

Ibogo may refer to:

- Ibogo, Boulgou, Burkina Faso
- Ibogo, Ganzourgou, Burkina Faso
