= Gaskom =

- Country: Burkina Faso
- Region: Centre-Est Region
- Province: Boulgou Province
- Department: Tenkodogo Department

Population (2019)
  - Total: 489

Gaskom is a village in the Tenkodogo Department of Boulgou Province in south-eastern Burkina Faso.

Population
Year	Pop.	±%
1985	299	—
2006	408	+36.5%
2019	489	+19.9%
