= Barwagdin =

- Country: Burkina Faso
- Region: Centre-Est Region
- Province: Boulgou Province
- Department: Bissiga Department

Population (2019)
  - Total: 796

Barwagdin is a village in the Bissiga Department of Boulgou Province in south-eastern Burkina Faso.

Population
Year	Pop.	±%
1985	439	—
2006	437	−0.5%
2019	796	+82.2%
