= Loukou =

Loukou may refer to:

- Loukou, Burkina Faso
- Loukou, Togo
- Loukou Monastery, Greece
