= Toabin =

Toabin Tobin
- Country: Burkina Faso
- Region: Centre-Est Region
- Province: Boulgou Province
- Department: Bané Department

Population (2019)
  - Total: 993

Toabin is a village in the Bané Department of Boulgou Province in south-eastern Burkina Faso.

Population
Year	Pop.	±%
1985	684	—
2006	684	+0.0%
2019	993	+45.2%
