= Syalguin =

Syalguin Siyalgue
- Country: Burkina Faso
- Region: Centre-Est Region
- Province: Boulgou Province
- Department: Bissiga Department

Population (2019)
  - Total: 1,839

Syalguin is a village in the Bissiga Department of Boulgou Province in southeastern Burkina Faso in western Africa.

Population
Year	Pop.	±%
1985	287	—
2006	838	+192.0%
2019	1,839	+119.5%
