= Sanogho =

Coordinates: 11.7857°N 0.5443°W

- Interactive map of Sanogho
- Country: Burkina Faso
- Region: Centre-Est Region
- Province: Boulgou Province
- Department: Garango Department

Population (2019)
  - Total: 4,612

Sanogho is a town in the Garango Department of Boulgou Province in south-eastern Burkina Faso.

Population
Year	Pop.	±%
1985	3,327	—
2006	4,312	+29.6%
2019	4,612	+7.0%
