= Boussouma-Peulh =

- Interactive map of Boussouma-Peulh
- Coordinates: 11.700°N 0.701°W
- Country: Burkina Faso
- Region: Centre-Est Region
- Province: Boulgou Province
- Department: Boussouma Department

Population (2019)
  - Total: 271

Boussouma-Peulh is a town in the Boussouma Department of Boulgou Province in south-eastern Burkina Faso.

Population
Year	Pop.	±%
1985	236	—
2006	209	−11.4%
2019	271	+29.7%
