= Ouanagou =

Ouanagou Wanagou
- Country: Burkina Faso
- Region: Centre-Est Region
- Province: Boulgou Province
- Department: Tenkodogo Department

Population (2019)
  - Total: 1,156

Ouanagou is a town in the Tenkodogo Department of Boulgou Province in south-eastern Burkina Faso.

Population
Year	Pop.	±%
1985	784	—
2006	1,031	+31.5%
2019	1,156	+12.1%
