= Kampoaga =

- Interactive map of Kampoaga
- Country: Burkina Faso
- Region: Centre-Est Region
- Province: Boulgou Province
- Department: Tenkodogo Department

Population (2019)
  - Total: 1,805

Kampoaga is a town in the Tenkodogo Department of Boulgou Province in south-eastern Burkina Faso.

Population
Year	Pop.	±%
1985	2,551	—
2006	5,037	+97.5%
2019	1,805	−64.2%
