= Kinzéonguin =

- Country: Burkina Faso
- Region: Centre-Est Region
- Province: Boulgou Province
- Department: Bissiga Department

Population (2019)
  - Total: 1,836

Kinzéonguin is a town in the Bissiga Department of Boulgou Province in south-eastern Burkina Faso.

Population
Year	Pop.	±%
1985	1,463	—
2006	1,529	+4.5%
2019	1,836	+20.1%
