= Donsin =

Donsin may refer to several settlements in Burkina Faso:

- Donsin, Bissiga, a village in Bissiga Department, Boulgou Province
- Donsin, Gounghin, a village in Gounghin Department, Kouritenga Province
- Donsin, Loumbila, a village in Loumbila Department, Oubritenga Province
