= Zabga =

- Country: Burkina Faso
- Region: Centre-Est Region
- Province: Boulgou Province
- Department: Boussouma Department

Population (2019)
  - Total: 2,570

Zabga is a town in the Boussouma Department of Boulgou Province in south-eastern Burkina Faso.

Population
Year	Pop.	±%
2006	2,175	—
2019	2,570	+18.2%
