= Bougre De Zoaga =

- Country: Burkina Faso
- Region: Centre-Est Region
- Province: Boulgou Province
- Department: Zoaga Department

Population (2019)
  - Total: 1,348

Bougre De Zoaga is a town in the Zoaga Department of Boulgou Province in south-eastern Burkina Faso.

Population
Year	Pop.	±%
2006	1,512	—
2019	1,348	−10.8%
