= Bantougri =

- Country: Burkina Faso
- Region: Centre-Est Region
- Province: Boulgou Province
- Department: Bané Department

Population (2019)
  - Total: 4,851

Bantougri is a town in the Bané Department of Boulgou Province in south-eastern Burkina Faso.

Population
Year	Pop.	±%
2006	3,028	—
2019	4,851	+60.2%
