= Dawega =

Dawega Douwega
- Country: Burkina Faso
- Region: Centre-Est Region
- Province: Boulgou Province
- Department: Zoaga Department

Population (2019)
  - Total: 625

Dawega is a village in the Zoaga Department of Boulgou Province in south-eastern Burkina Faso.

Population
| Year | Pop. | ±% |
|---|---|---|
| 1985 | 347 | — |
| 2006 | 418 | +20.5% |
| 2019 | 625 | +49.5% |
