= Bingo, Boulgou =

Coordinates: 10.9905°N 0.5302°W

Bingo
- Interactive map of Bingo
- Country: Burkina Faso
- Region: Centre-Est Region
- Province: Boulgou Province
- Department: Zoaga Department

Population (2019)
  - Total: 1,027

Bingo is a town in the Zoaga Department of Boulgou Province in south-eastern Burkina Faso.

Population
Year	Pop.	±%
1985	1,008	—
2006	1,010	+0.2%
2019	1,027	+1.7%
