= Soper, Burkina Faso =

Soper Sopere
- Country: Burkina Faso
- Region: Centre-Est Region
- Province: Boulgou Province
- Department: Zonsé Department

Population (2019)
  - Total: 996

Soper is a village in the Zonsé Department of Boulgou Province in south-eastern Burkina Faso.

Population
Year	Pop.	±%
1985	412	—
2006	668	+62.1%
2019	996	+49.1%
