= Dissiam =

- Country: Burkina Faso
- Region: Centre-Est Region
- Province: Boulgou Province
- Department: Garango Department

Population (2019)
  - Total: 3,145

Dissiam is a town in the Garango Department of Boulgou Province in south-eastern Burkina Faso.

Population
Year	Pop.	±%
1985	1,711	—
2006	3,289	+92.2%
2019	3,145	−4.4%
