= Dierma =

Coordinates: 11°42′N 0°45′W

- Interactive map of Dierma
- Country: Burkina Faso
- Region: Centre-Est Region
- Province: Boulgou Province
- Department: Boussouma Department

Population (2019)
  - Total: 3,394

Dierma is a town in the Boussouma Department of Boulgou Province in south-eastern Burkina Faso.

Population
Year	Pop.	±%
1985	1,326	—
2006	2,493	+88.0%
2019	3,394	+36.1%
