= Tikanré =

Tikanré Tekanre
- Country: Burkina Faso
- Region: Centre-Est Region
- Province: Boulgou Province
- Department: Bissiga Department

Population (2019)
  - Total: 453

Tikanré is a village in the Bissiga Department of Boulgou Province in south-eastern Burkina Faso.

Population
Year	Pop.	±%
1985	241	—
2006	717	+197.5%
2019	453	−36.8%
