= Godin, Bissiga =

Godin
- Country: Burkina Faso
- Region: Centre-Est Region
- Province: Boulgou Province
- Department: Bissiga Department

Population (2019)
  - Total: 1,748

Godin is a town in the Bissiga Department of Boulgou Province in south-eastern Burkina Faso.

Population
Year	Pop.	±%
2006	1,272	—
2019	1,748	+37.4%
