= Nama, Burkina Faso =

Nama
- Country: Burkina Faso
- Region: Centre-Est Region
- Province: Boulgou Province
- Department: Tenkodogo Department

Population (2019)
  - Total: 1,042

Nama is a village in the Tenkodogo Department of Boulgou Province in south-eastern Burkina Faso.

Population
Year	Pop.	±%
1985	513	—
2006	805	+56.9%
2019	1,042	+29.4%
