= Gambaghin =

Gambaghin Gambaguin
- Country: Burkina Faso
- Region: Centre-Est Region
- Province: Boulgou Province
- Department: Tenkodogo Department

Population (2019)
  - Total: 1,831

Gambaghin is a village in the Tenkodogo Department of Boulgou Province in south-eastern Burkina Faso.

Population
Year	Pop.	±%
1985	773	—
2006	1,137	+47.1%
2019	1,831	+61.0%
