= Beguedo Peulh =

- Location in Burkina Faso
- Coordinates: 11°46′49.5″N 0°43′59.6″W
- Country: Burkina Faso
- Region: Centre-Est Region
- Province: Boulgou Province
- Department: Béguédo Department

Population (2019)
  - Total: 243

Beguedo Peulh is a village in the Béguédo Department of Boulgou Province in south-eastern Burkina Faso.

Population
Year	Pop.	±%
1985	240	—
2006	169	−29.6%
2019	243	+43.8%
