= Dango, Burkina Faso =

Coordinates: 11°40′N 0°42′W

Dango
- Interactive map of Dango
- Country: Burkina Faso
- Region: Centre-Est Region
- Province: Boulgou Province
- Department: Boussouma Department

Population (2019)
  - Total: 3,975

Dango is a town in the Boussouma Department of Boulgou Province in south-eastern Burkina Faso.

Population
Year	Pop.	±%
1985	1,556	—
2006	2,381	+53.0%
2019	3,975	+66.9%
