= Koubéogo =

Koubéogo may refer to:

- Koubéogo, Boulgou, Burkina Faso
- Koubéogo, Ganzourgou, Burkina Faso
