= Zoumtoega =

- Country: Burkina Faso
- Region: Centre-Est Region
- Province: Boulgou Province
- Department: Komtoèga Department

Population (2019)
  - Total: 2,406

Zoumtoega is a town in the Komtoèga Department of Boulgou Province in south-eastern Burkina Faso.

Population
Year	Pop.	±%
1985	1,254	—
2006	1,819	+45.1%
2019	2,406	+32.3%
