= Samsagbo =

Samsagbo Sansagbo
- Country: Burkina Faso
- Region: Centre-Est Region
- Province: Boulgou Province
- Department: Komtoèga Department

Population (2019)
  - Total: 2,141

Samsagbo is a town in the Komtoèga Department of Boulgou Province in south-eastern Burkina Faso.

Population
Year	Pop.	±%
1985	1,220	—
2006	1,946	+59.5%
2019	2,141	+10.0%
