= Oumnoghin =

- Country: Burkina Faso
- Region: Centre-Est Region
- Province: Boulgou Province
- Department: Bané Department

Population (2019)
  - Total: 3,588

Oumnoghin is a town in the Bané Department of Boulgou Province in south-eastern Burkina Faso.

Population
Year	Pop.	±%
1985	1,205	—
2006	2,383	+97.8%
2019	3,588	+50.6%
