= Lergho =

- Country: Burkina Faso
- Region: Centre-Est Region
- Province: Boulgou Province
- Department: Garango Department

Population (2019)
  - Total: 3,780

Lergho is a town in the Garango Department of Boulgou Province in south-eastern Burkina Faso.

Population
| Year | Pop. | ±% |
|---|---|---|
| 1985 | 2,159 | — |
| 2006 | 4,155 | +92.5% |
| 2019 | 3,780 | −9.0% |
