= Béguédo Department =

Coordinates: 11.791°N 0.718°W

Béguédo
- Department
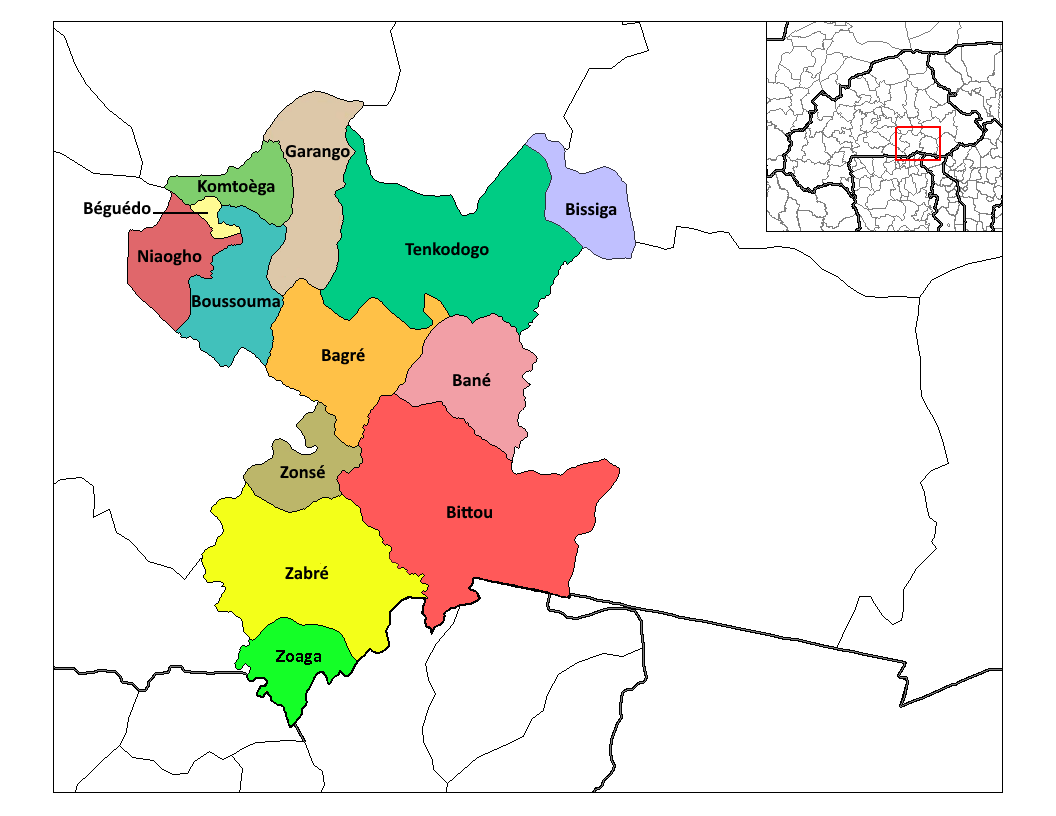
- Béguédo Department location in the province
- Country: Burkina Faso
- Province: Boulgou Province

Area
  - Total: 13.16 sq mi (34.08 km^{2})

Population (2019 census)
  - Total: 28,094
  - Density: 2,135/sq mi (824.4/km^{2})
- Time zone: UTC+0 (GMT 0)

Béguédo is a small department or commune of Boulgou Province in eastern Burkina Faso. Its capital lies at the town of Béguédo. According to the 2019 census the department has a total population of 28,094.

== Towns and villages ==
- Béguédo (14 692 inhabitants) (capital)
- Beguedo Peulh (675 inhabitants)
- Diarra (395 inhabitants)
- Fingla (2 118 inhabitants)

== Health ==
The department has an isolated dispensary in Fingla and a single health and social promotion center (CSPS) in Béguédo while the medical center with surgical antenna (CMA) is in Garango and the regional hospital center (CHR) is in Tenkodogo.
