= Toece, Boulgou =

Toece Toesse
- Country: Burkina Faso
- Region: Centre-Est Region
- Province: Boulgou Province
- Department: Komtoèga Department

Population (2019)
  - Total: 1,757

Toece is a town in the Komtoèga Department of Boulgou Province in south-eastern Burkina Faso.

Population
Year	Pop.	±%
1985	596	—
2006	1,011	+69.6%
2019	1,757	+73.8%
