= Korgoreya =

Korgoreya Korguereya
- Country: Burkina Faso
- Region: Centre-Est Region
- Province: Boulgou Province
- Department: Zonsé Department

Population (2019)
  - Total: 1,478

Korgoreya is a village in the Zonsé Department of Boulgou Province in south-eastern Burkina Faso.

Population
Year	Pop.	±%
1985	428	—
2006	1,149	+168.5%
2019	1,478	+28.6%
