= Niaogho-Peulh =

- Country: Burkina Faso
- Region: Centre-Est Region
- Province: Boulgou Province
- Department: Niaogho Department

Population (2019)
  - Total: 238

Niaogho-Peulh is a village in the Niaogho Department of Boulgou Province in south-eastern Burkina Faso.

Population
Year	Pop.	±%
2006	272	—
2019	238	−12.5%
