= Koungou, Burkina Faso =

Koungou
- Country: Burkina Faso
- Region: Centre-Est Region
- Province: Boulgou Province
- Department: Zonsé Department

Population (2019)
  - Total: 1,159

Koungou is a village in the Zonsé Department of Boulgou Province in south-eastern Burkina Faso.

Population
Year	Pop.	±%
1985	497	—
2006	729	+46.7%
2019	1,159	+59.0%
