= Pargou =

- Country: Burkina Faso
- Region: Centre-Est Region
- Province: Boulgou Province
- Department: Zoaga Department

Population (2019)
  - Total: 1,799

Pargou is a town in the Zoaga Department of Boulgou Province in south-eastern Burkina Faso.

Population
| Year | Pop. | ±% |
|---|---|---|
| 2006 | 1,245 | — |
| 2019 | 1,799 | +44.5% |
