= Pouswaka =

Pouswaka Poussouaka
- Country: Burkina Faso
- Region: Centre-Est Region
- Province: Boulgou Province
- Department: Tenkodogo Department

Population (2019)
  - Total: 1,946

Pouswaka is a town in the Tenkodogo Department of Boulgou Province in south-eastern Burkina Faso.

Population
Year	Pop.	±%
1985	1,720	—
2006	839	−51.2%
2019	1,946	+131.9%
