= Tabissi =

- Country: Burkina Faso
- Region: Centre-Est Region
- Province: Boulgou Province
- Department: Zoaga Department

Population (2019)
  - Total: 385

Tabissi is a village in the Zoaga Department of Boulgou Province in south-eastern Burkina Faso.

Population
Year	Pop.	±%
1985	137	—
2006	140	+2.2%
2019	385	+175.0%
