= Douré, Boulgou =

Douré
- Country: Burkina Faso
- Region: Centre-Est Region
- Province: Boulgou Province
- Department: Bané Department

Population (2019)
  - Total: 1,159

Douré is a village in the Bané Department of Boulgou Province in south-eastern Burkina Faso.

Population
Year	Pop.	±%
1985	474	—
2006	863	+82.1%
2019	1,159	+34.3%
