= Cella De Loanga =

Cella De Loanga Cella De Louanga
- Country: Burkina Faso
- Region: Centre-Est Region
- Province: Boulgou Province
- Department: Tenkodogo Department

Population (2019)
  - Total: 452

Cella De Loanga is a village in the Tenkodogo Department of Boulgou Province in south-eastern Burkina Faso.

Population
Year	Pop.	±%
1985	453	—
2006	387	−14.6%
2019	452	+16.8%
