= Zougbilin =

- Country: Burkina Faso
- Region: Centre-Est Region
- Province: Boulgou Province
- Department: Bané Department

Population (2019)
  - Total: 407

Zougbilin is a village in the Bané Department of Boulgou Province in south-eastern Burkina Faso.

Population
Year	Pop.	±%
1985	115	—
2006	319	+177.4%
2019	407	+27.6%
