= Zoaga-Yarce =

- Country: Burkina Faso
- Region: Centre-Est Region
- Province: Boulgou Province
- Department: Zoaga Department

Population (2019)
  - Total: 376

Zoaga-Yarce is a village in the Zoaga Department of Boulgou Province in south-eastern Burkina Faso.

Population
Year	Pop.	±%
1985	162	—
2006	302	+86.4%
2019	376	+24.5%
