= Bissiga-Yarcé =

- Country: Burkina Faso
- Region: Centre-Est Region
- Province: Boulgou Province
- Department: Bissiga Department

Population (2019)
  - Total: 431

Bissiga-Yarcé is a village in the Bissiga Department of Boulgou Province in north-eastern Burkina Faso.

Population
Year	Pop.	±%
1985	210	—
2006	271	+29.0%
2019	431	+59.0%
