= Belemkangrin =

Belemkangrin Belemkagre
- Country: Burkina Faso
- Region: Centre-Est Region
- Province: Boulgou Province
- Department: Bissiga Department

Population (2019)
  - Total: 445

Belemkangrin is a village in the Bissiga Department of Boulgou Province in south-eastern Burkina Faso.

Population
Year	Pop.	±%
1985	120	—
2006	539	+349.2%
2019	445	−17.4%
