= Silmiougou, Boulgou =

Silmiougou
- Country: Burkina Faso
- Region: Centre-Est Region
- Province: Boulgou Province
- Department: Tenkodogo Department

Population (2019)
  - Total: 849

Silmiougou is a village in the Tenkodogo Department of Boulgou Province in south-eastern Burkina Faso.

Population
Year	Pop.	±%
1985	208	—
2006	691	+232.2%
2019	849	+22.9%
