= Massougou =

Coordinates: 11°37′N 0°43′W

- Interactive map of Massougou
- Country: Burkina Faso
- Region: Centre-Est Region
- Province: Boulgou Province
- Department: Boussouma Department

Population (2019)
  - Total: 348

Massougou is a town in the Boussouma Department of Boulgou Province in south-eastern Burkina Faso.

Population
Year	Pop.	±%
1985	260	—
2006	64	−75.4%
2019	348	+443.8%
