= Ounzeogo-Peulh =

- Country: Burkina Faso
- Region: Centre-Est
- Province: Boulgou
- Department: Tenkodogo

Population (2019)
  - Total: 109

Ounzeogo-Peulh is a village in the Tenkodogo department of Boulgou province in south-eastern Burkina Faso.

Population
Year	Pop.	±%
1985	78	—
2006	70	−10.3%
2019	109	+55.7%
