= Koabgtenga =

Koabgtenga Kobgatenga
- Country: Burkina Faso
- Region: Centre-Est Region
- Province: Boulgou Province
- Department: Bané Department

Population (2019)
  - Total: 1,199

Koabgtenga is a town in the Bané Department of Boulgou Province in south-eastern Burkina Faso.

Population
Year	Pop.	±%
1985	666	—
2006	1,068	+60.4%
2019	1,199	+12.3%
