= Batto =

- Country: Burkina Faso
- Region: Centre-Est Region
- Province: Boulgou Province
- Department: Boussouma Department

Population (2019)
  - Total: 1,654

Batto is a town in the Boussouma Department of Boulgou Province in south-eastern Burkina Faso.

Population
Year	Pop.	±%
1985	1,001	—
2006	1,752	+75.0%
2019	1,654	−5.6%
