= Sago (disambiguation) =

Sago is a starch extracted from the stems of metroxylon sagu palms.

Sago may also refer to:

== Plants ==
- Metroxylon sagu, or sago palm, a palm from which sago is extracted
- Cycas revoluta, or sago cycad, a cycad from which starch also known as sago is extracted
- Zamia integrifolia, another cycad plant sometimes called wild sago

== Food ==
- Sago pudding, a sweet pudding made from pearl sago or tapioca
- Sap Sago, US brand of Swiss Schabziger cheese
- Sago soup, a Cantonese variant of tapioca pudding
- Tapioca, also referred to as sago

== Places ==
- Sago, Burkina Faso
- Sago, Côte d'Ivoire
- Sago, West Virginia, United States
- Sago Lane, Singapore
- Sago Street, Singapore
- Sago Township, Minnesota, United States
- Mount Sago, Indonesia

== Other uses ==
- SAGO, the Scientific Advisory Group for Origins of Novel Pathogens
- Sago palm weevil or red palm weevil, Rhynchophorus ferrugineus
  - Sago worm, the larva of the sago palm weevil
- Sagopa Kajmer, or Sago, Turkish rapper

== See also ==
- Starch
- Sego (disambiguation)
