= Tengsoba, Boussouma =

Tengsoba
- Country: Burkina Faso
- Region: Centre-Est Region
- Province: Boulgou Province
- Department: Boussouma Department

Population (2019)
  - Total: 2,263

Tengsoba is a town in the Boussouma Department of Boulgou Province in south-eastern Burkina Faso.

Population
Year	Pop.	±%
1985	3,251	—
2006	1,747	−46.3%
2019	2,263	+29.5%
