= Poestenga =

- Country: Burkina Faso
- Region: Centre-Est Region
- Province: Boulgou Province
- Department: Bissiga Department

Population (2019)
  - Total: 1,519

Poestenga is a town in the Bissiga Department of Boulgou Province in south-eastern Burkina Faso.

Population
Year	Pop.	±%
1985	449	—
2006	3,994	+789.5%
2019	1,519	−62.0%
