= Nazé =

- Country: Burkina Faso
- Region: Centre-Est Region
- Province: Boulgou Province
- Department: Bané Department

Population (2019)
  - Total: 1,814

Nazé is a village in the Bané Department of Boulgou Province in south-eastern Burkina Faso.

Population
Year	Pop.	±%
2006	933	—
2019	1,814	+94.4%
