= Pouswaka-Peulh =

Pouswaka-Peulh Poussouaka-Peulh
- Country: Burkina Faso
- Region: Centre-Est Region
- Province: Boulgou Province
- Department: Tenkodogo Department

Population (2019)
  - Total: 176

Pouswaka-Peulh is a village in the Tenkodogo Department of Boulgou Province in south-eastern Burkina Faso.

Population
Year	Pop.	±%
1985	226	—
2006	110	−51.3%
2019	176	+60.0%
