= Koama =

Coordinates: 11.6333°N 0.4333°W

- Interactive map of Koama
- Country: Burkina Faso
- Region: Centre-Est Region
- Province: Boulgou Province
- Department: Tenkodogo Department

Population (2019)
  - Total: 788

Koama is a village in the Tenkodogo Department of Boulgou Province in south-eastern Burkina Faso.

Population
Year	Pop.	±%
1985	579	—
2006	733	+26.6%
2019	788	+7.5%
