= Sangou-Nazela =

- Country: Burkina Faso
- Region: Centre-Est Region
- Province: Boulgou Province
- Department: Zonsé Department

Population (2019)
  - Total: 451

Location of Burkina Faso

Sangou-Nazela is a village in the Zonsé Department of Boulgou Province in south-eastern Burkina Faso.

Population
Year	Pop.	±%
2006	547	—
2019	451	−17.6%
