= Zigla-Koulpele =

Coordinates: 11°43′N 0°38′W

- Interactive map of Zigla-Koulpele
- Country: Burkina Faso
- Region: Centre-Est Region
- Province: Boulgou Province
- Department: Garango Department

Population (2019)
  - Total: 5,178

Zigla-Koulpele is a town in the Garango Department of Boulgou Province in south-eastern Burkina Faso.

Population
Year	Pop.	±%
1985	1,869	—
2006	4,001	+114.1%
2019	5,178	+29.4%
