= Soadin =

- Country: Burkina Faso
- Region: Centre-Est Region
- Province: Boulgou Province
- Department: Bané Department

Population (2019)
  - Total: 1,003

Soadin is a village in the Bané Department of Boulgou Province in south-eastern Burkina Faso.

Population
Year	Pop.	±%
2006	677	—
2019	1,003	+48.2%
