= Zoaga-Peulh =

- Country: Burkina Faso
- Region: Centre-Est Region
- Province: Boulgou Province
- Department: Zoaga Department

Population (2019)
  - Total: 189

Zoaga-Peulh is a village in the Zoaga Department of Boulgou Province in south-eastern Burkina Faso.

Population
Year	Pop.	±%
2006	249	—
2019	189	−24.1%
