= Kou, Burkina Faso =

Coordinates: 11°44′N 1°55′W

Kou
- Interactive map of Kou
- Country: Burkina Faso
- Region: Centre-Est Region
- Province: Boulgou Province
- Department: Tenkodogo Department

Population (2019)
  - Total: 1,072

Kou is a village in the Tenkodogo Department of Boulgou Province in south-eastern Burkina Faso.

Population
Year	Pop.	±%
1985	437	—
2006	593	+35.7%
2019	1,072	+80.8%
