= Zame =

Coordinates: 11°05′N 0°34′W

- Interactive map of Zame
- Country: Burkina Faso
- Region: Centre-Est Region
- Province: Boulgou Province
- Department: Zoaga Department

Population (2019)
  - Total: 1,169

Zame is a village in the Zoaga Department of Boulgou Province in south-eastern Burkina Faso.

Population
Year	Pop.	±%
1985	919	—
2006	889	−3.3%
2019	1,169	+31.5%
