= Pissy, Burkina Faso =

Pissy Pissi
- Country: Burkina Faso
- Region: Centre-Est Region
- Province: Boulgou Province
- Department: Komtoèga Department

Population (2019)
  - Total: 790

Pissy is a village in the Komtoèga Department of Boulgou Province in south-eastern Burkina Faso.

Population
Year	Pop.	±%
1985	407	—
2006	552	+35.6%
2019	790	+43.1%
