= Léré =

Léré may refer to the following places:

- Léré, Cher, a commune in the department of Cher, France
- Léré, Chad, a town in Chad
- Léré, Mali, a town in Mali
- Léré, Burkina Faso, a town in Burkina Faso
- Lere, Nigeria, a Local government area in Nigeria
