= Mangare =

Mangare Mongare
- Country: Burkina Faso
- Region: Centre-Est Region
- Province: Boulgou Province
- Department: Zonsé Department

Population (2019)
  - Total: 670

Mangare is a village in the Zonsé Department of Boulgou Province in south-eastern Burkina Faso.

Population
Year	Pop.	±%
1985	234	—
2006	323	+38.0%
2019	670	+107.4%
