= Ningare =

Coordinates: 11°41′N 0°21′W

- Interactive map of Ningare
- Country: Burkina Faso
- Region: Centre-Est Region
- Province: Boulgou Province
- Department: Tenkodogo Department

Population (2019)
  - Total: 3,315

Ningare is a town in the Tenkodogo Department of Boulgou Province in south-eastern Burkina Faso.

Population
Year	Pop.	±%
1985	661	—
2006	2,648	+300.6%
2019	3,315	+25.2%
