= Tengsoba =

- Country: Burkina Faso
- Region: Centre-Est Region
- Province: Boulgou Province
- Department: Niaogho Department

Population (2019)
  - Total: 7,297

Tengsoba is a town in the Niaogho Department of Boulgou Province in south-eastern Burkina Faso.

Population
Year	Pop.	±%
2006	5,511	—
2019	7,297	+32.4%
