= Sondogo =

- Country: Burkina Faso
- Region: Centre-Est Region
- Province: Boulgou Province
- Department: Niaogho Department

Population (2019)
  - Total: 758

Sondogo is a village in the Niaogho Department of Boulgou Province in south-eastern Burkina Faso.

== Geography ==
Sondogo is located at 9° 59' 10N, 15° 58' 29E. The elevation is 1099 feet above sea level.

Population
Year	Pop.	±%
1985	395	—
2006	391	−1.0%
2019	758	+93.9%
