= Kokoaga-Ouest =

- Country: Burkina Faso
- Region: Centre-Est Region
- Province: Boulgou Province
- Department: Tenkodogo Department

Population (2019)
  - Total: 714

Kokoaga-Ouest is a village in the Tenkodogo Department of Boulgou Province in south-eastern Burkina Faso.

Population
Year	Pop.	±%
1985	689	—
2006	765	+11.0%
2019	714	−6.7%
