= Oueguedo-Yarce =

- Country: Burkina Faso
- Region: Centre-Est Region
- Province: Boulgou Province
- Department: Tenkodogo Department

Population (2019)
  - Total: 283

Oueguedo-Yarce is a village in the Tenkodogo Department of Boulgou Province in south-eastern Burkina Faso.

Population
Year	Pop.	±%
1985	184	—
2006	193	+4.9%
2019	283	+46.6%
