= Yerba-Peulh =

- Country: Burkina Faso
- Region: Centre-Est Region
- Province: Boulgou Province
- Department: Zonsé Department

Population (2019)
  - Total: 293

Yerba-Peulh is a village in the Zonsé Department of Boulgou Province in south-eastern Burkina Faso.

there is a school named after Valerio Atzori, a young soldier from Ladispoli (Rome) built in 2013–2014 by the association Animo Onlus.

Population
Year	Pop.	±%
2006	187	—
2019	293	+56.7%
