= Bangoula =

- Country: Burkina Faso
- Region: Centre-Est Region
- Province: Boulgou Province
- Department: Garango Department

Population (2019)
  - Total: 2,390

Bangoula is a town in the Garango Department of Boulgou Province in south-eastern Burkina Faso.

Population
Year	Pop.	±%
1985	1,497	—
2006	1,091	−27.1%
2019	2,390	+119.1%
