= Malenga-Nagsore =

- Country: Burkina Faso
- Region: Centre-Est Region
- Province: Boulgou Province
- Department: Tenkodogo Department

Population (2019)
  - Total: 3,505

Malenga-Nagsore is a town in the Tenkodogo Department of Boulgou Province in south-eastern Burkina Faso.

Population
Year	Pop.	±%
1985	2,356	—
2006	3,990	+69.4%
2019	3,505	−12.2%
