= Boussouma, Boulgou =

Coordinates: 11.7312°N 0.6627°W

Boussouma
- Interactive map of Boussouma
- Country: Burkina Faso
- Region: Centre-Est Region
- Province: Boulgou Province
- Department: Boussouma Department

Population (2019)
  - Total: 5,730

Boussouma is a town in, and capital of, the Boussouma Department of Boulgou Province in south-eastern Burkina Faso.

Population
Year	Pop.	±%
1985	2,414	—
2006	4,412	+82.8%
2019	5,730	+29.9%
