= Bassindingo =

- Country: Burkina Faso
- Region: Centre-Est Region
- Province: Boulgou Province
- Department: Niaogho Department

Population (2019)
  - Total: 1,728

Bassindingo is a town in the Niaogho Department of Boulgou Province in south-eastern Burkina Faso.

Population
Year	Pop.	±%
1985	781	—
2006	1,300	+66.5%
2019	1,728	+32.9%
