= Yergoya =

- Country: Burkina Faso
- Region: Centre-Est Region
- Province: Boulgou Province
- Department: Zonsé Department

Population (2019)
  - Total: 3,299

Yergoya is a village in the Zonsé Department of Boulgou Province in south-eastern Burkina Faso. As of 2019, the village has a population of 2,725.

Population
Year	Pop.	±%
1985	177	—
2006	513	+189.8%
2019	3,299	+543.1%
