= Dattou =

- Country: Burkina Faso
- Region: Centre-Est Region
- Province: Boulgou Province
- Department: Bané Department

Population (2019)
  - Total: 1,924

Dattou is a town in the Bané Department of Boulgou Province in south-eastern Burkina Faso.

Population
Year	Pop.	±%
1985	877	—
2006	1,459	+66.4%
2019	1,924	+31.9%
