= Yaganse =

Yaganse Yagance
- Country: Burkina Faso
- Region: Centre-Est Region
- Province: Boulgou Province
- Department: Komtoèga Department

Population (2019)
  - Total: 1,293

Yaganse is a village in the Komtoèga Department of Boulgou Province in south-eastern Burkina Faso.

Population
Year	Pop.	±%
1985	552	—
2006	1,257	+127.7%
2019	1,293	+2.9%
