= Boumbin =

Coordinates: 11.5467°N 0.3730°W

- Interactive map of Boumbin
- Country: Burkina Faso
- Region: Centre-Est Region
- Province: Boulgou Province
- Department: Bané Department

Population (2019)
  - Total: 1,670

Boumbin is a village in the Bané Department of Boulgou Province in south-eastern Burkina Faso.

Population
Year	Pop.	±%
2006	1,054	—
2019	1,670	+58.4%
