= Yaoghin =

- Country: Burkina Faso
- Region: Centre-Est Region
- Province: Boulgou Province
- Department: Komtoèga Department

Population (2019)
  - Total: 647

Yaoghin is a village in the Komtoèga Department of Boulgou Province in south-eastern Burkina Faso.

Population
| Year | Pop. | ±% |
|---|---|---|
| 2006 | 555 | — |
| 2019 | 647 | +16.6% |
