= Pissalin =

Pissalin Pissale
- Country: Burkina Faso
- Region: Centre-Est Region
- Province: Boulgou Province
- Department: Bissiga Department

Population (2019)
  - Total: 432

Pissalin is a village in the Bissiga Department of Boulgou Province in south-eastern Burkina Faso.

Population
Year	Pop.	±%
1985	191	—
2006	378	+97.9%
2019	432	+14.3%
