= Gambaaga =

Village in south-eastern Burkina Faso

- Country: Burkina Faso
- Region: Centre-Est Region
- Province: Boulgou Province
- Department: Bissiga Department

Population (2019)
  - Total: 589

Gambaaga is a village in the Bissiga Department of Boulgou Province in south-eastern Burkina Faso.

Population
| Year | Pop. | ±% |
|---|---|---|
| 2006 | 376 | — |
| 2019 | 589 | +56.6% |
