= Daze, Burkina Faso =

Daze
- Country: Burkina Faso
- Region: Centre-Est Region
- Province: Boulgou Province
- Department: Tenkodogo Department

Population (2019)
  - Total: 391

Daze is a village in the Tenkodogo Department of Boulgou Province in south-eastern Burkina Faso.

Population
Year	Pop.	±%
1985	375	—
2006	686	+82.9%
2019	391	−43.0%
