= Gando I =

- Country: Burkina Faso
- Region: Centre-Est Region
- Province: Boulgou Province
- Department: Tenkodogo Department

Population (2019)
  - Total: 433

Gando I is a village in the Tenkodogo Department of Boulgou Province in south-eastern Burkina Faso.

Population
Year	Pop.	±%
2006	352	—
2019	433	+23.0%
