= Doubguin-Ouantanghin =

Doubguin-Ouantanghin Doubguin-Ouantanguin
- Country: Burkina Faso
- Region: Centre-Est Region
- Province: Boulgou Province
- Department: Tenkodogo Department

Population (2019)
  - Total: 2,593

Doubguin-Ouantanghin is a town in the Tenkodogo Department of Boulgou Province in south-eastern Burkina Faso.

Population
Year	Pop.	±%
1985	470	—
2006	2,179	+363.6%
2019	2,593	+19.0%
