= Bidiga =

- Interactive map of Bidiga
- Country: Burkina Faso
- Region: Centre-Est Region
- Province: Boulgou Province
- Department: Tenkodogo Department

Population (2019)
  - Total: 1,046

Bidiga is a village in the Tenkodogo Department of Boulgou Province in south-eastern Burkina Faso.

Population
Year	Pop.	±%
1985	658	—
2006	585	−11.1%
2019	1,046	+78.8%
