= Niarba =

Coordinates: 11°45′N 0°50′W

- Interactive map of Niarba
- Country: Burkina Faso
- Region: Centre-Est Region
- Province: Boulgou Province
- Department: Niaogho Department

Population (2019)
  - Total: 2,576

Niarba is a town in the Niaogho Department of Boulgou Province in south-eastern Burkina Faso.

Population
| Year | Pop. | ±% |
|---|---|---|
| 1985 | 926 | — |
| 2006 | 2,076 | +124.2% |
| 2019 | 2,576 | +24.1% |
