= Ponga, Boulgou =

Ponga
- Interactive map of Ponga
- Country: Burkina Faso
- Region: Centre-Est Region
- Province: Boulgou Province
- Department: Zonsé Department

Population (2019)
  - Total: 8,587

Ponga is a town in the Zonsé Department of Boulgou Province in south-eastern Burkina Faso.

Population
Year	Pop.	±%
1985	1,395	—
2006	3,694	+164.8%
2019	8,587	+132.5%
