= Zankougdo =

Zankougdo Zankoudgo
- Country: Burkina Faso
- Region: Centre-Est Region
- Province: Boulgou Province
- Department: Bissiga Department

Population (2019)
  - Total: 1,036

Zankougdo is a village in the Bissiga Department of Boulgou Province in south-eastern Burkina Faso.

Population
Year	Pop.	±%
1985	564	—
2006	752	+33.3%
2019	1,036	+37.8%
