= Koughin =

- Country: Burkina Faso
- Region: Centre-Est Region
- Province: Boulgou Province
- Department: Tenkodogo Department

Population (2019)
  - Total: 714

Koughin is a village in the Tenkodogo Department of Boulgou Province in south-eastern Burkina Faso.

Population
| Year | Pop. | ±% |
|---|---|---|
| 2006 | 477 | — |
| 2019 | 714 | +49.7% |
