= Diella, Burkina Faso =

Diella
- Country: Burkina Faso
- Region: Centre-Est Region
- Province: Boulgou Province
- Department: Zonsé Department

Population (2005 est.)
  - Total: 476

Diella is a village in the Zonsé Department of Boulgou Province in south-eastern Burkina Faso. As of 2005, the village has a population of 476.
