= Labretenga =

Village in Centre-Est Region, Burkina Faso

- Country: Burkina Faso
- Region: Centre-Est Region
- Province: Boulgou Province
- Department: Tenkodogo Department

Population (2019)
  - Total: 371

Labretenga is a village in the Tenkodogo Department of Boulgou Province in south-eastern Burkina Faso.

Population
Year	Pop.	±%
1985	197	—
2006	167	−15.2%
2019	371	+122.2%
