= Koutiama =

Coordinates: 11°50′N 0°09′W

- Interactive map of Koutiama
- Country: Burkina Faso
- Region: Centre-Est Region
- Province: Boulgou Province
- Department: Bissiga Department

Population (2019)
  - Total: 928

Koutiama is a village in the Bissiga Department of Boulgou Province in south-eastern Burkina Faso.

Population
Year	Pop.	±%
1985	319	—
2006	619	+94.0%
2019	928	+49.9%
