= Patin, Burkina Faso =

Patin
- Country: Burkina Faso
- Region: Centre-Est Region
- Province: Boulgou Province
- Department: Bané Department

Population (2019)
  - Total: 670

Patin or Patin Peulh is a village in the Bané Department of Boulgou Province in south-eastern Burkina Faso.

Population
Year	Pop.	±%
1985	197	—
2006	404	+105.1%
2019	670	+65.8%
