= Guiemssim =

Guiemssim Guiessim
- Country: Burkina Faso
- Region: Centre-Est Region
- Province: Boulgou Province
- Department: Zonsé Department

Population (2019)
  - Total: 1,232

Guiemssim is a town in the Zonsé Department of Boulgou Province in south-eastern Burkina Faso.

Population
Year	Pop.	±%
1985	370	—
2006	717	+93.8%
2019	1,232	+71.8%
