= Toghin, Boulgou =

Toghin Togue
- Country: Burkina Faso
- Region: Centre-Est Region
- Province: Boulgou Province
- Department: Tenkodogo Department

Population (2019)
  - Total: 1,202

Toghin is a village in the Tenkodogo Department of Boulgou Province in south-eastern Burkina Faso.

Population
Year	Pop.	±%
1985	448	—
2006	684	+52.7%
2019	1,202	+75.7%
