= Lengha =

Coordinates: 11.6335°N 0.7198°W

- Interactive map of Lengha
- Country: Burkina Faso
- Region: Centre-Est Region
- Province: Boulgou Province
- Department: Boussouma Department

Population (2019)
  - Total: 4,716

Lengha is a town in the Boussouma Department of Boulgou Province in south-eastern Burkina Faso.

Population
Year	Pop.	±%
1985	1,675	—
2006	3,413	+103.8%
2019	4,716	+38.2%
