= Zeke, Burkina Faso =

Zeke
- Country: Burkina Faso
- Region: Centre-Est Region
- Province: Boulgou Province
- Department: Tenkodogo Department

Population (2019)
  - Total: 533

Zeke is a village in the Tenkodogo Department of Boulgou Province in south-eastern Burkina Faso.

Population
Year	Pop.	±%
1985	751	—
2006	908	+20.9%
2019	533	−41.3%
