= Gnekouneta =

- Country: Burkina Faso
- Region: Centre-Est Region
- Province: Boulgou Province
- Department: Zonsé Department

Population (2019)
  - Total: 2,038

Gnekouneta or Nyekouneta is a village in the Zonsé Department of Boulgou Province in south-eastern Burkina Faso.

Population
Year	Pop.	±%
1985	875	—
2006	1,052	+20.2%
2019	2,038	+93.7%
