= Fingla =

Coordinates: 11.8174°N 0.7572°W

Fingla Finguela
- Interactive map of Fingla
- Country: Burkina Faso
- Region: Centre-Est Region
- Province: Boulgou Province
- Department: Béguédo Department

Population (2019)
  - Total: 2,779

Fingla is a town in the Béguédo Department of Boulgou Province in south-eastern Burkina Faso.

Population
Year	Pop.	±%
1985	2,724	—
2006	2,535	−6.9%
2019	2,779	+9.6%
