= Gogoma =

- Country: Burkina Faso
- Region: Centre-Est Region
- Province: Boulgou Province
- Department: Garango Department

Population (2019)
  - Total: 911

Gogoma or Gogma is a village in the Garango Department of Boulgou Province in south-eastern Burkina Faso.

Population
Year	Pop.	±%
1985	500	—
2006	556	+11.2%
2019	911	+63.8%
