= Pakoungou =

- Country: Burkina Faso
- Region: Centre-Est Region
- Province: Boulgou Province
- Department: Zoaga Department

Population (2019)
  - Total: 1,025

Pakoungou is a village in the Zoaga Department of Boulgou Province in south-eastern Burkina Faso.

Population
Year	Pop.	±%
1985	745	—
2006	1,186	+59.2%
2019	1,025	−13.6%
