= Lengha-Peulh =

- Country: Burkina Faso
- Region: Centre-Est Region
- Province: Boulgou Province
- Department: Boussouma Department

Population (2019)
  - Total: 391

Lengha-Peulh is a town in the Boussouma Department of Boulgou Province in south-eastern Burkina Faso.

Population
Year	Pop.	±%
1985	296	—
2006	248	−16.2%
2019	391	+57.7%
