= Kombinatenga =

- Country: Burkina Faso
- Region: Centre-Est Region
- Province: Boulgou Province
- Department: Garango Department

Population (2019)
  - Total: 2,187

Kombinatenga is a town in the Garango Department of Boulgou Province in south-eastern Burkina Faso.

Population
Year	Pop.	±%
1985	686	—
2006	1,549	+125.8%
2019	2,187	+41.2%
