= Ounzeogo =

- Interactive map of Ounzeogo
- Country: Burkina Faso
- Region: Centre-Est Region
- Province: Boulgou Province
- Department: Tenkodogo Department

Population (2019)
  - Total: 2,987

Ounzeogo is a town in the Tenkodogo Department of Boulgou Province in south-eastern Burkina Faso.

Population
Year	Pop.	±%
1985	1,728	—
2006	2,228	+28.9%
2019	2,987	+34.1%
