= Leda, Burkina Faso =

Leda
- Country: Burkina Faso
- Region: Centre-Est Region
- Province: Boulgou Province
- Department: Tenkodogo Department

Population (2019)
  - Total: 2,295

Leda is a town in the Tenkodogo Department of Boulgou Province in south-eastern Burkina Faso.

Population
Year	Pop.	±%
1985	1,249	—
2006	1,903	+52.4%
2019	2,295	+20.6%
