= Torla, Burkina Faso =

Torla
- Country: Burkina Faso
- Region: Centre-Est Region
- Province: Boulgou Province
- Department: Garango Department

Population (2019)
  - Total: 4,824

Torla is a town in the Garango Department of Boulgou Province in south-eastern Burkina Faso.

Population
Year	Pop.	±%
2006	4,059	—
2019	4,824	+18.8%
