= Oueguedo-Peulh =

- Country: Burkina Faso
- Region: Centre-Est Region
- Province: Boulgou Province
- Department: Tenkodogo Department

Population (2019)
  - Total: 109

Oueguedo-Peulh is a village in the Tenkodogo Department of Boulgou Province in south-eastern Burkina Faso.

Population
Year	Pop.	±%
2006	30	—
2019	109	+263.3%
