= Goulanda =

- Country: Burkina Faso
- Region: Centre-Est Region
- Province: Boulgou Province
- Department: Komtoèga Department

Population (2019)
  - Total: 3,621

Goulanda is a town in the Komtoèga Department of Boulgou Province in south-eastern Burkina Faso.

Population
Year	Pop.	±%
1985	1,423	—
2006	2,391	+68.0%
2019	3,621	+51.4%
