= Ouâda =

Coordinates: 11.5158°N 0.3547°W

- Interactive map of Ouâda
- Country: Burkina Faso
- Region: Centre-Est Region
- Province: Boulgou Province
- Department: Bané Department

Population (2019)
  - Total: 3,730

Ouâda is a town in the Bané Department of Boulgou Province in south-eastern Burkina Faso.

Population
Year	Pop.	±%
1985	858	—
2006	2,189	+155.1%
2019	3,730	+70.4%
