= Ouaregou-Peulh =

- Country: Burkina Faso
- Region: Centre-Est Region
- Province: Boulgou Province
- Department: Garango Department

Population (2019)
  - Total: 110

Ouaregou-Peulh is a village in the Garango Department of Boulgou Province in south-eastern Burkina Faso.

Population
Year	Pop.	±%
1985	143	—
2006	62	−56.6%
2019	110	+77.4%
