= Gomin =

- Country: Burkina Faso
- Region: Centre-Est Region
- Province: Boulgou Province
- Department: Bané Department

Population (2019)
  - Total: 898

Gomin is a village in the Bané Department of Boulgou Province in south-eastern Burkina Faso.

Population
| Year | Pop. | ±% |
|---|---|---|
| 1985 | 299 | — |
| 2006 | 716 | +139.5% |
| 2019 | 898 | +25.4% |
