= Goza =

- Gozo, Pakistan, or Gozo, is a village in Dadu District, Sindh province, Pakistan at 27°06′N 67°40′E
- Gozo (clan), a clan of the Chakma people
- Gozo (mat), woven mat similar to tatami
- Gozo (name), Japanese place name and family name come from nobleman's seat
- Dial-Goza House, an American 1880s-era historic house in Florida
- Sara Goza, American pediatrician
