= Zoaga Department =

Coordinates: 11°02′17″N 0°35′25″W

Zoaga
- Department
- Interactive map of Zoaga
- Country: Burkina Faso
- Province: Boulgou Province

Population (2019)
  - Total: 13,233
- Time zone: UTC+0 (GMT 0)

Zoaga is a department or commune of Boulgou Province in eastern Burkina Faso. Its capital lies at the town of Zoaga.

== Demography ==
Historical population
| Year | Pop. | ±% |
|---|---|---|
| 1996 | 11,295 | — |
| 2006 | 10,812 | −4.3% |
| 2019 | 13,233 | +22.4% |

According to the 2019 census the department has a total population of 13,233.

48.8% of the population is male and 51.2% of the population is female. 44.4% of the population is under the age of 15, 49.7% is 15 to 64 years old. Only 5.8% of the population is 65 years or older.

== Towns and villages ==
- Zoaga (2 395 inhabitants) (capital)
- Bingo (1 119 inhabitants)
- Bougre De Zoaga (1 485 inhabitants)
- Bourma De Zoaga (787 inhabitants)
- Dawega (501 inhabitants)
- Koukoadore (150 inhabitants)
- Mong-Naba (832 inhabitants)
- Pakoungou (786 inhabitants)
- Pargou (1 180 inhabitants)
- Tabissi (167 inhabitants)
- Zame (829 inhabitants)
- Zerboko (496 inhabitants)
- Zoaga-Peulh (361 inhabitants)
- Zoaga-Yarce (207 inhabitants)
