= Diarra-Betongo =

Coordinates: 11.3609°N 0.5846°W

- Interactive map of Diarra-Betongo
- Country: Burkina Faso
- Region: Centre-Est Region
- Province: Boulgou Province
- Department: Zonsé Department

Population (2019)
  - Total: 1,593

Diarra-Betongo is a village in the Zonsé Department of Boulgou Province in south-eastern Burkina Faso.

Population
| Year | Pop. | ±% |
|---|---|---|
| 1985 | 1,573 | — |
| 2006 | 1,091 | −30.6% |
| 2019 | 1,593 | +46.0% |
