= Ibogo, Boulgou =

Ibogo
- Country: Burkina Faso
- Region: Centre-Est Region
- Province: Boulgou Province
- Department: Niaogho Department

Population (2019)
  - Total: 2,704

Ibogo is a town in the Niaogho Department of Boulgou Province in south-eastern Burkina Faso.

Population
Year	Pop.	±%
1985	981	—
2006	1,671	+70.3%
2019	2,704	+61.8%
