= Niaogho =

Coordinates: 11°46′N 0°46′W

- Interactive map of Niaogho
- Country: Burkina Faso
- Region: Centre-Est Region
- Province: Boulgou Province
- Department: Niaogho Department

Population (2019)
  - Total: 8,792

Niaogho is the capital of the Niaogho Department of Boulgou Province in southeastern Burkina Faso. Niaogho was founded by the Bissa ethnic group and is twinned with the French commune of Saint-Paul-sur-Save.

Population
Year	Pop.	±%
1985	5,193	—
2006	6,769	+30.3%
2019	8,792	+29.9%
