= Béguédo =

- Town
- Location in Burkina Faso
- Coordinates: 11°46′51″N 0°44′2″W
- Country: Burkina Faso
- Region: Centre-Est Region
- Province: Boulgou Province
- Department: Béguédo Department
- Elevation: 212 m (696 ft)

Population (2019)
  - Total: 21,894
- Time zone: UTC0

Béguédo is a town and seat of the Béguédo Department of Boulgou Province in south-eastern Burkina Faso. It is located on the highway route N17. As of 2019, the town has a population of 21,894. One of the six branches of the Banque Atlantique in Burkina Faso is located in Béguédo.

Population
Year	Pop.	±%
1985	6,559	—
1985	6,559	+0.0%
2006	15,339	+133.9%
2019	21,894	+42.7%
