= Gounghin-Petit =

- Country: Burkina Faso
- Region: Centre-Est Region
- Province: Boulgou Province
- Department: Bissiga Department

Population (2019)
  - Total: 651

Gounghin-Petit is a village in the Bissiga Department of Boulgou Province in south-eastern Burkina Faso.

Population
| Year | Pop. | ±% |
|---|---|---|
| 1985 | 238 | — |
| 2006 | 164 | −31.1% |
| 2019 | 651 | +297.0% |
