= Komtoèga =

Coordinates: 11.8281°N 0.6577°W

- Interactive map of Komtoèga
- Country: Burkina Faso
- Region: Centre-Est Region
- Province: Boulgou Province
- Department: Komtoèga Department

Population (2019)
  - Total: 7,096

Komtoèga is a town and seat of the Komtoèga Department of Boulgou Province in south-eastern Burkina Faso.

Population
Year	Pop.	±%
1985	3,980	—
2006	5,197	+30.6%
2019	7,096	+36.5%
