= Tenkodogo Department =

Coordinates: 11°47′N 0°22′W

Tenkodogo
- Department
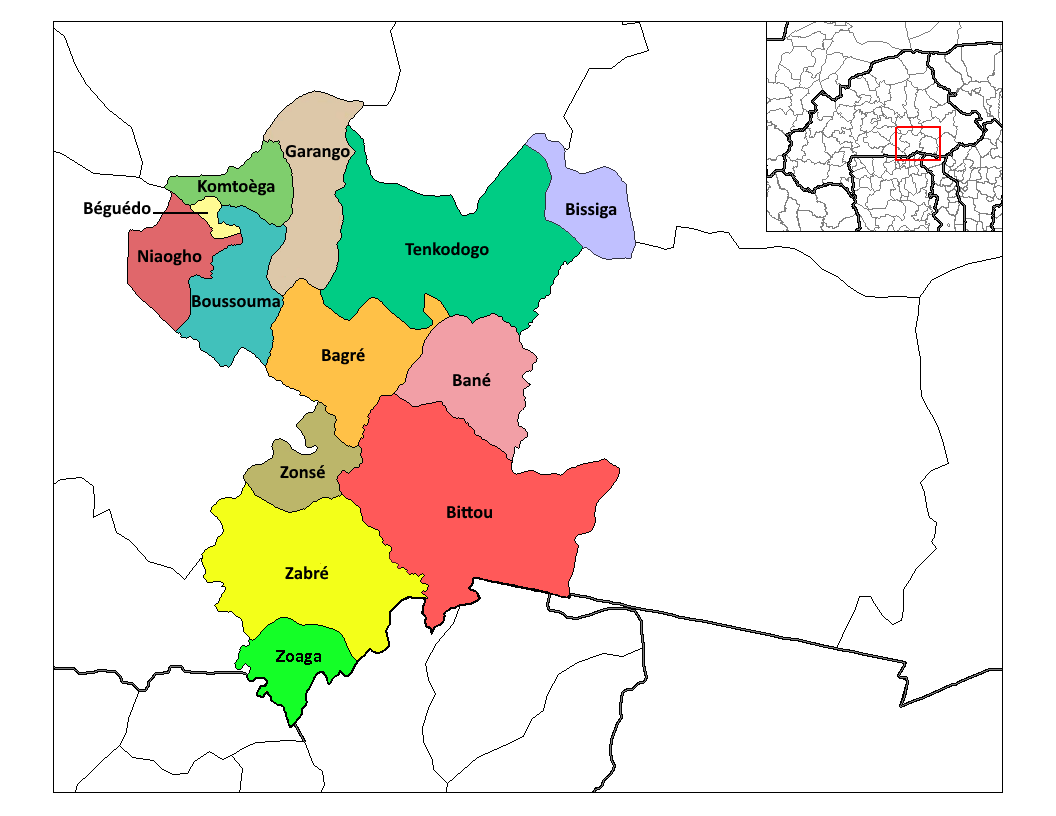
- Tenkodogo Department location in the province
- Country: Burkina Faso
- Province: Boulgou Province

Area
  - Department: 442 sq mi (1,146 km^{2})

Population (2019 census)
  - Department: 157,947
  - Density: 357.0/sq mi (137.8/km^{2})
  - Urban: 61,936
- Time zone: UTC+0 (GMT 0)

Tenkodogo is a department or commune of Boulgou Province in eastern Burkina Faso. Its capital is the town of Tenkodogo. According to the 2019 census the department has a total population of 157,947.

== Towns and villages ==
- Tenkodogo (61 936 inhabitants) (capital)
- Bado (749 inhabitants)
- Baleme (455 inhabitants)
- Bampela (635 inhabitants)
- Basbedo (951 inhabitants)
- Baskoure (446 inhabitants)
- Bassare (669 inhabitants)
- Belce (428 inhabitants)
- Bidiga (764 inhabitants)
- Bissiga De Gando (279 inhabitants)
- Boura (972 inhabitants)
- Cella (1 731 inhabitants)
- Cella De Loanga (421 inhabitants)
- Daze, Burkina Faso (254 inhabitants)
- Donsene (166 inhabitants)
- Donsene-Yarce (492 inhabitants)
- Doubguin-Ouantanghin (1 739 inhabitants)
- Doure (319 inhabitants)
- Gando I (432 inhabitants)
- Gando Ii (398 inhabitants)
- Gambaghin (987 inhabitants)
- Gaskom (472 inhabitants)
- Gouni-Peulh (327 inhabitants)
- Guella (706 inhabitants)
- Kabri (662 inhabitants)
- Kampoaga (3 705 inhabitants)
- Kassougou (314 inhabitants)
- Koama (745 inhabitants)
- Kokoaga-Ouest (789 inhabitants)
- Kou (678 inhabitants)
- Koughin (678 inhabitants)
- Koknoghin (796 inhabitants)
- Labretenga (576 inhabitants)
- Lebce (298 inhabitants)
- Leda, Burkina Faso (1 591 inhabitants)
- Loanga (2 580 inhabitants)
- Loanga Peulh (840 inhabitants)
- Loukou (1 991 inhabitants)
- Loukou-Peulh (147 inhabitants)
- Malenga-Nagsore (3 340 inhabitants)
- Malenga-Yarce (1 103 inhabitants)
- Milla (481 inhabitants)
- Moaga (397 inhabitants)
- Naba-Sougdin (404 inhabitants)
- Nama (792 inhabitants)
- Ningare (2 160 inhabitants)
- Ouamne (556 inhabitants)
- Ouanagou (1 065 inhabitants)
- Oueguedo (1 194 inhabitants)
- Oueguedo-Peulh (130 inhabitants)
- Oueguedo-Yarce (179 inhabitants)
- Oueloghin (1 961 inhabitants)
- Ounzeogo (2 241 inhabitants)
- Ounzeogo-Peulh (147 inhabitants)
- Ourema (1 192 inhabitants)
- Piougou (228 inhabitants)
- Piroukou (1 354 inhabitants)
- Pouswaka (1 527 inhabitants)
- Pouswaka-Peulh (792 inhabitants)
- Sabtenga (3 314 inhabitants)
- Sago, Burkina Faso (389 inhabitants)
- Sampa (684 inhabitants)
- Sassema (2 197 inhabitants)
- Sassema-Peulh (181 inhabitants)
- Sebretenga (494 inhabitants)
- Sebretenga De Godin (1 093 inhabitants)
- Sigriyaoghin (896 inhabitants)
- Silmiougou (685 inhabitants)
- Sone (282 inhabitants)
- Sorbin (297 inhabitants)
- Soumagou (1 074 inhabitants)
- Tenonghin (1 264 inhabitants)
- Tenonghin-Peulh (637 inhabitants)
- Teodoure (337 inhabitants)
- Tisselin (1 242 inhabitants)
- Tisselin-Yarce (167 inhabitants)
- Toghin (641 inhabitants)
- Vag-Vaguin (1 366 inhabitants)
- Zabatorla (522 inhabitants)
- Zaka (896 inhabitants)
- Zandoubre (261 inhabitants)
- Zano (1 543 inhabitants)
- Zeke (872 inhabitants)
- Zoromdougou (264 inhabitants)
