= Léré, Burkina Faso =

Coordinates: 13°41′N 0°03′W

Léré
- Interactive map of Léré
- Country: Burkina Faso
- Region: Centre-Est Region
- Province: Boulgou Province
- Department: Bané Department

Population (2019)
  - Total: 1,058

Léré (Burkina) is a village in the Bané Department of Boulgou Province in south-eastern Burkina Faso.

Population
Year	Pop.	±%
1985	625	—
2006	674	+7.8%
2019	1,058	+57.0%
