= Loukou, Burkina Faso =

Loukou
- Country: Burkina Faso
- Region: Centre-Est Region
- Province: Boulgou Province
- Department: Tenkodogo Department

Population (2019)
  - Total: 3,021

Loukou is a town in the Tenkodogo Department of Boulgou Province in south-eastern Burkina Faso.

Population
Year	Pop.	±%
1985	2,337	—
2006	2,257	−3.4%
2019	3,021	+33.9%
