= Koubéogo, Boulgou =

Koubéogo
- Country: Burkina Faso
- Region: Centre-Est Region
- Province: Boulgou Province
- Department: Bissiga Department

Population (2019)
  - Total: 298

Koubéogo is a village in the Bissiga Department of Boulgou Province in south-eastern Burkina Faso.

Population
Year	Pop.	±%
1985	179	—
2006	286	+59.8%
2019	298	+4.2%
