= Boussouma Department, Boulgou =

Boussouma
- Department
- Location within Burkina Faso
- Country: Burkina Faso
- Region: Centre-Est Region
- Province: Boulgou Province

Area
  - Total: 148.8 sq mi (385.4 km^{2})

Population (2010 census)
  - Total: 35,892
  - Density: 241.2/sq mi (93.13/km^{2})
- Time zone: UTC+0 (GMT 0)

Boussouma Department is a department or commune of Boulgou Province in eastern Burkina Faso. The capital is Boussouma. The population of the department was 35,892 in 2019.

== Towns and villages ==
Note: Populations are a 2005 estimate.

- Boussouma (4,027 inhabitants) (Capital)
- Bangagou (1,544 inhabitants)
- Batto (1,681 inhabitants)
- Boussouma-Peulh (299 inhabitants)
- Dango (2,093 inhabitants)
- Dierma (2,446 inhabitants)
- Koumbore (1,780 inhabitants)
- Lengha (2,989 inhabitants)
- Lengha-Peulh (309 inhabitants)
- Massougou (325 inhabitants)
- Nonka (571 inhabitants)
- Ouazi (878 inhabitants)
- Saaba (2,511 inhabitants)
- Saregou (551 inhabitants)
- Tengsoba (1,691 inhabitants)
- Zabga (1,974 inhabitants)
