= Garango Department =

Coordinates: 11°48′N 0°33′W

Garango
- Department
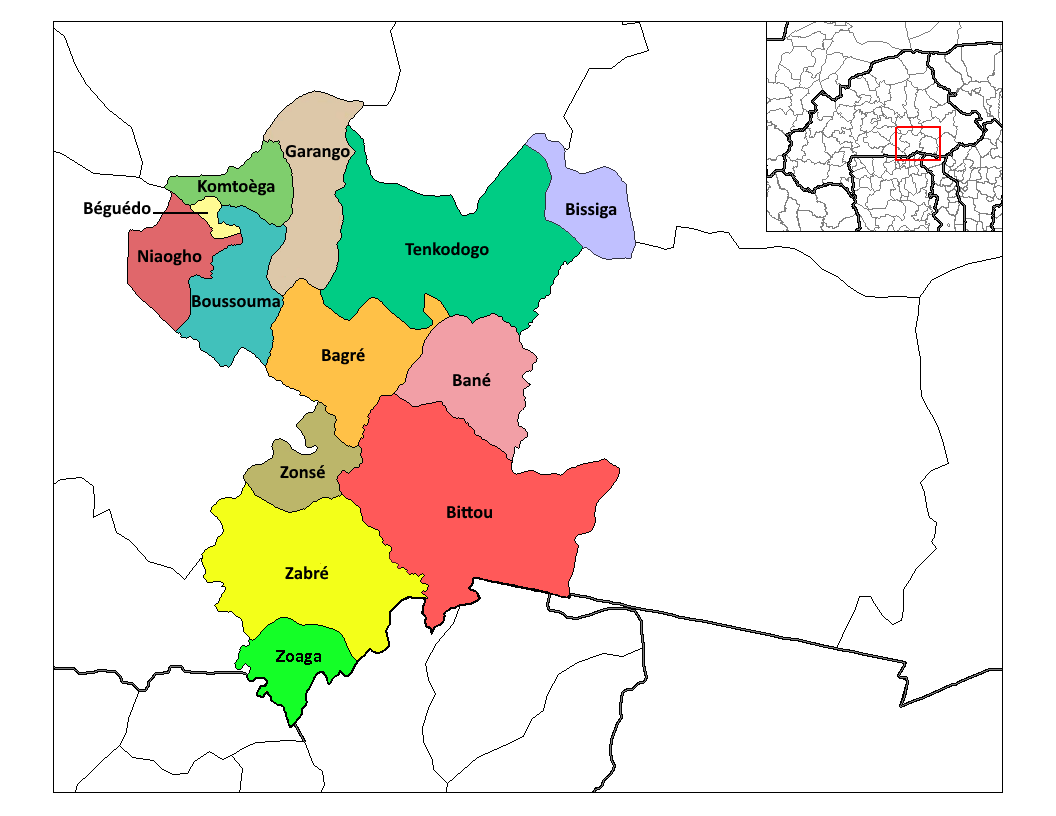
- Garango Department location in the province
- Country: Burkina Faso
- Province: Boulgou Province

Area
  - Department: 172 sq mi (445 km^{2})

Population (2019 census)
  - Department: 91,158
  - Density: 531/sq mi (205/km^{2})
  - Urban: 40,404
- Time zone: UTC+0 (GMT 0)

Garango is a department or commune of Boulgou Province in eastern Burkina Faso. Its capital is the town of Garango. According to the 2019 census the department has a total population of 91,158.

== Towns and villages ==
- Garango (40 404 inhabitants) (capital)
- Bangoula (2 337 inhabitants)
- Belgue (516 inhabitants)
- Dissiam (3 019 inhabitants)
- Gogoma (659 inhabitants)
- Kombinatenga (1 201 inhabitants)
- Lergho (3 830 inhabitants)
- Ouaregou (9 090 inhabitants)
- Ouaregou-Peulh (214 inhabitants)
- Sanogho (4 537 inhabitants)
- Sanogho-Peulh (165 inhabitants)
- Siguinvousse (732 inhabitants)
- Torla (3 526 inhabitants)
- Zigla-Koulpele (4 476 inhabitants)
- Zigla-Polace (2 966 inhabitants)
