= Sampa, Burkina Faso =

Coordinates: 11°42′N 0°21′W

Sampa
- Interactive map of Sampa
- Country: Burkina Faso
- Region: Centre-Est Region
- Province: Boulgou Province
- Department: Tenkodogo Department

Population (2019)
  - Total: 1,146

Sampa is a village in the Tenkodogo Department of Boulgou Province in south-eastern Burkina Faso.

Population
Year	Pop.	±%
2006	887	—
2019	1,146	+29.2%
