= Gounghin-Grand =

- Country: Burkina Faso
- Region: Centre-Est Region
- Province: Boulgou Province
- Department: Bissiga Department

Population (2019)
  - Total: 644

Gounghin-Grand is a village in the Bissiga Department of Boulgou Province in south-eastern Burkina Faso.

Population
Year	Pop.	±%
1985	194	—
2006	406	+109.3%
2019	644	+58.6%
