= Komtoèga Department =

Coordinates: 11°49′32″N 0°40′46″W

Komtoèga
- Department
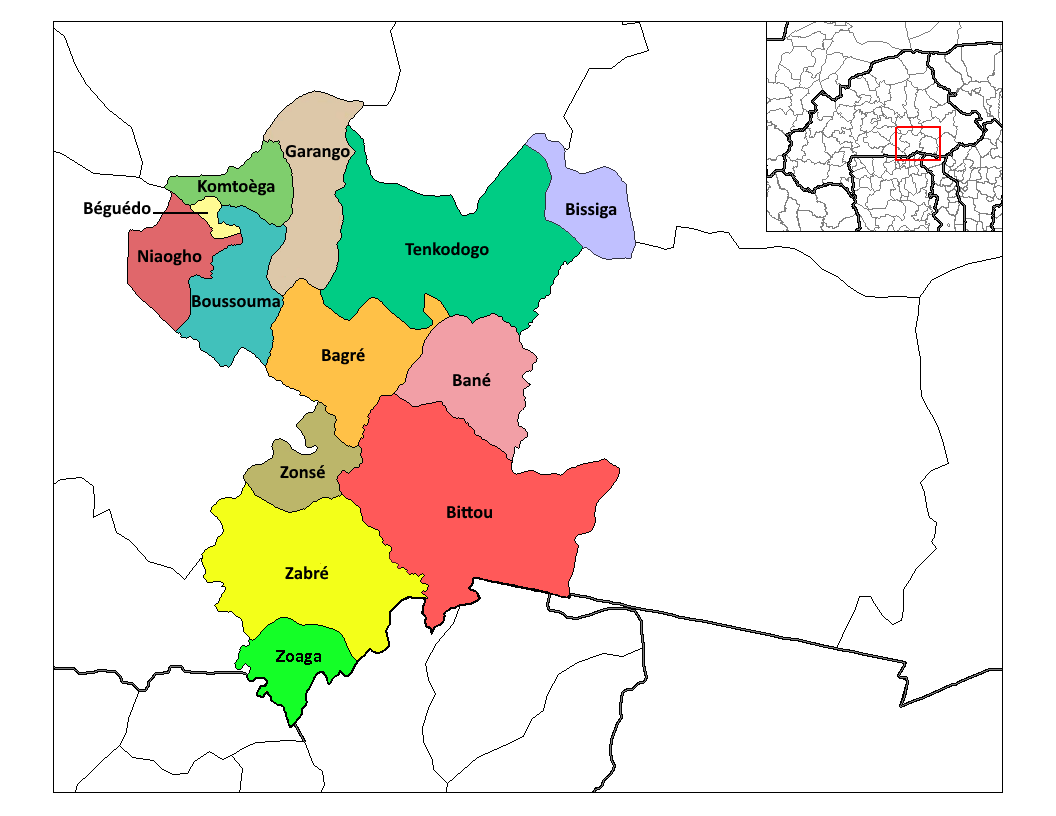
- Komtoèga Department location in the province
- Country: Burkina Faso
- Province: Boulgou Province

Area
  - Total: 77.5 sq mi (200.6 km^{2})

Population (2019 census)
  - Total: 27,144
  - Density: 350.5/sq mi (135.3/km^{2})
- Time zone: UTC+0 (GMT 0)

Komtoèga is a department or commune of Boulgou Province in eastern Burkina Faso. Its capital lies at the town of Komtoèga. According to the 2019 census the department has a total population of 27,144.

== Towns and villages ==
- Komtoèga (5 038 inhabitants) (capital)
- Dega (1 479 inhabitants)
- Goghin (1 361 inhabitants)
- Goulanda (2 410 inhabitants)
- Komtoega-Peulh (412 inhabitants)
- Pissy (539 inhabitants)
- Samsagbo (1 679 inhabitants)
- Toece (1 139 inhabitants)
- Womzougou (968 inhabitants)
- Yaganse (890 inhabitants)
- Yaoghin (362 inhabitants)
- Yelboulga (683 inhabitants)
- Zoumtoega (1 957 inhabitants)
