= Diarra, Burkina Faso =

Diarra
- Country: Burkina Faso
- Region: Centre-Est Region
- Province: Boulgou Province
- Department: Béguédo Department

Population (2019)
  - Total: 218

Diarra is a village in the Béguédo Department of Boulgou Province in south-eastern Burkina Faso.

Population
Year	Pop.	±%
2006	1,110	—
2019	218	−80.4%
