= Siguinvoussé, Garango =

Siguinvoussé Siguin-Vousse
- Country: Burkina Faso
- Region: Centre-Est Region
- Province: Boulgou Province
- Department: Garango Department

Population (2019)
  - Total: 1,306

Siguinvoussé is a village in the Garango Department of Boulgou Province in south-eastern Burkina Faso.

Population
Year	Pop.	±%
1985	502	—
2006	815	+62.4%
2019	1,306	+60.2%
