= Bané =

Coordinates: 11.5744°N 0.3324°W

- Interactive map of Bané
- Country: Burkina Faso
- Region: Centre-Est Region
- Province: Boulgou Province
- Department: Bané Department

Population (2005 est.)
  - Total: 1,095

Bané is a town in the Bané Department of Boulgou Province in south-eastern Burkina Faso. As of 2005, the town has a population of 1,095.
