= Donsin, Bissiga =

Coordinates: 11°35′N 1°12′W

Donsin
- Interactive map of Donsin
- Country: Burkina Faso
- Region: Centre-Est Region
- Province: Boulgou Province
- Department: Bissiga Department

Population (2019)
  - Total: 973

Donsin is a village in the Bissiga Department of Boulgou Province in south-eastern Burkina Faso.

Population
Year	Pop.	±%
2006	781	—
2019	973	+24.6%
