= Zonsé =

Coordinates: 11°22′N 0°37′W

- Interactive map of Zonsé
- Country: Burkina Faso
- Region: Centre-Est Region
- Province: Boulgou Province
- Department: Zonsé Department

Population (2019)
  - Total: 2,491

Zonsé is a town and seat of the Zonsé Department of Boulgou Province in south-eastern Burkina Faso.

Population
Year	Pop.	±%
1985	1,062	—
2006	1,096	+3.2%
2019	2,491	+127.3%
