= Niaogho Department =

Coordinates: 11°46′31.60″N 0°45′59.90″W

Niaogho
- Department
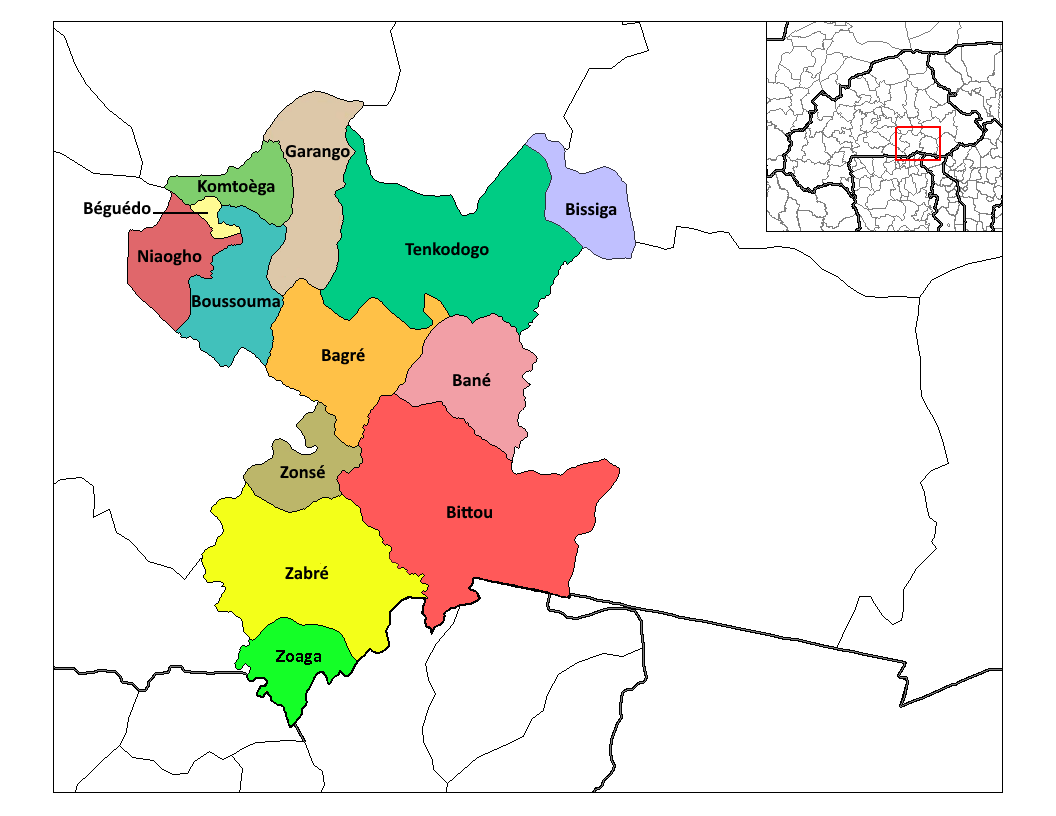
- Niaogho Department location in the province
- Country: Burkina Faso
- Province: Boulgou Province

Area
  - Total: 110.6 sq mi (286.4 km^{2})

Population (2019 census)
  - Total: 25,547
  - Density: 231.0/sq mi (89.20/km^{2})
- Time zone: UTC+0 (GMT 0)

Niaogho is a department or commune of Boulgou Province in eastern Burkina Faso. Its capital lies at the town of Niaogho. According to the 2019 census the department has a total population of 25,547.

== Towns and villages ==
- Niaogho (13 545 inhabitants) (capital)
- Bassindingo (1 279 inhabitants)
- Gozi (1 025 inhabitants)
- Ibogo (1 752 inhabitants)
- Niaogho-Peulh (305 inhabitants)
- Niarba (1 649 inhabitants)
- Sondogo (428 inhabitants)
- Tengsoba (5 719 inhabitants)
