= Bissiga Department =

Coordinates: 12°26′N 0°32′W

Bissiga
- Department
- Interactive map of Bissiga
- Country: Burkina Faso
- Province: Boulgou Province

Area
  - Total: 103.1 sq mi (267.1 km^{2})

Population (2019 census)
  - Total: 26,183
  - Density: 253.9/sq mi (98.03/km^{2})
- Time zone: UTC+0 (GMT 0)

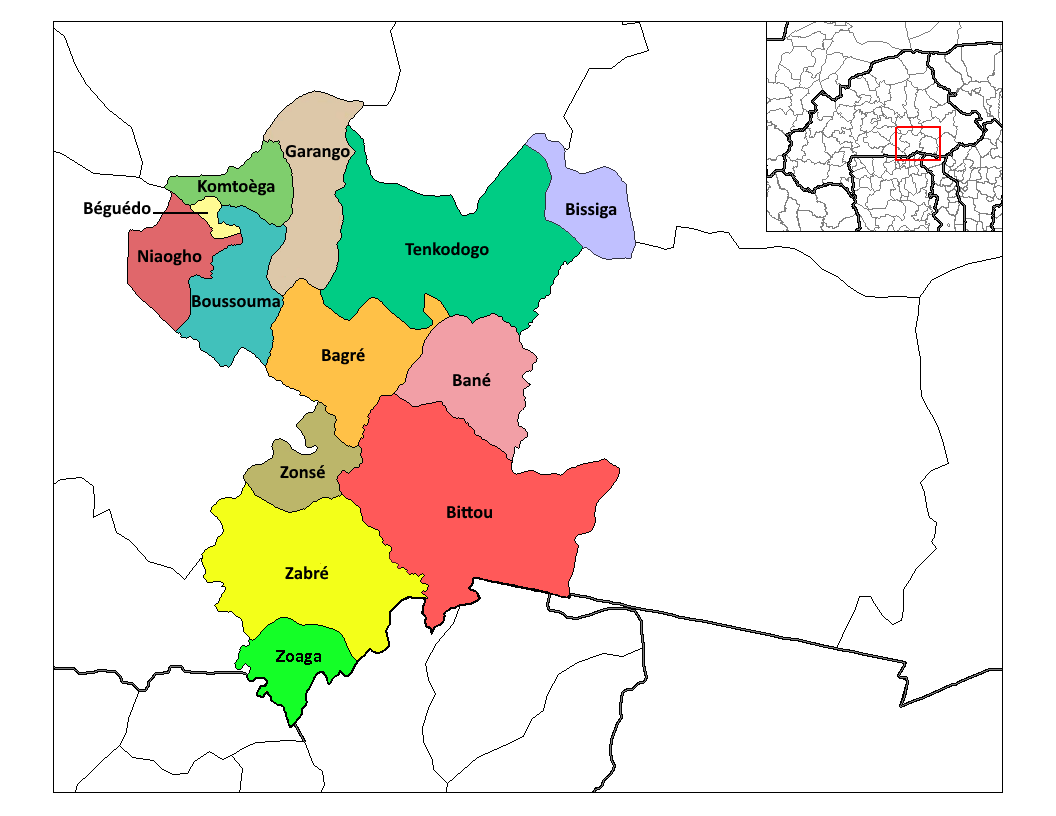

Bissiga is a department or commune of Boulgou Province in eastern Burkina Faso. Its capital lies at the town of Bissiga. According to the 1996 census the department has a total population of 26,183.

== Towns and villages ==
- Bissiga (3 286 inhabitants) (capital)
- Barwagdin (529 inhabitants)
- Belemkangrin (213 inhabitants)
- Benna (2 116 inhabitants)
- Bissiga-Yarcé (210 inhabitants)
- Donsin (557 inhabitants)
- Gambaaga (418 inhabitants)
- Godin (1 366 inhabitants)
- Gounghin-Grand (365 inhabitants)
- Gounghin-Petit (338 inhabitants)
- Kankaraboguin (169 inhabitants)
- Koubéogo (350 inhabitants)
- Kinzéonguin (1 509 inhabitants)
- Koulbako (992 inhabitants)
- Koutiama (481 inhabitants)
- Pissalin (282 inhabitants)
- Poestenga (3 429 inhabitants)
- Sannabin (354 inhabitants)
- Siraboguin (393 inhabitants)
- Syalguin (635 inhabitants)
- Tikanré (307 inhabitants)
- Zamboundi (216 inhabitants)
- Zankougdo (749 inhabitants)
