= Bado, Burkina Faso =

Bado
- Location in Burkina Faso
- Country: Burkina Faso
- Region: Centre-Est Region
- Province: Boulgou Province
- Department: Tenkodogo Department

Population (2019)
  - Total: 1,765

Bado is a village in the Tenkodogo Department of Boulgou Province in south-eastern Burkina Faso.

Population
Year	Pop.	±%
1985	845	—
2006	799	−5.4%
2019	1,765	+120.9%
