= Gozi =

Gozi Gossi
- Country: Burkina Faso
- Region: Centre-Est Region
- Province: Boulgou Province
- Department: Niaogho Department

Population (2019)
  - Total: 1,454

Gozi is a town in the Niaogho Department of Boulgou Province in south-eastern Burkina Faso.

Population
Year	Pop.	±%
1985	664	—
2006	985	+48.3%
2019	1,454	+47.6%
