= Bissiga, Boulgou =

Coordinates: 12.4356°N 0.5339°W

Bissiga
- Interactive map of Bissiga
- Country: Burkina Faso
- Region: Centre-Est Region
- Province: Boulgou Province
- Department: Bissiga Department

Population (2019)
  - Total: 4,542

Bissiga is a town in the Bissiga Department of Boulgou Province in south-eastern Burkina Faso.

Population
Year	Pop.	±%
1985	1,953	—
2006	2,795	+43.1%
2019	4,542	+62.5%
