= Bané Department =

Coordinates: 11°35′34″N 0°20′54″W

Bané
- Department
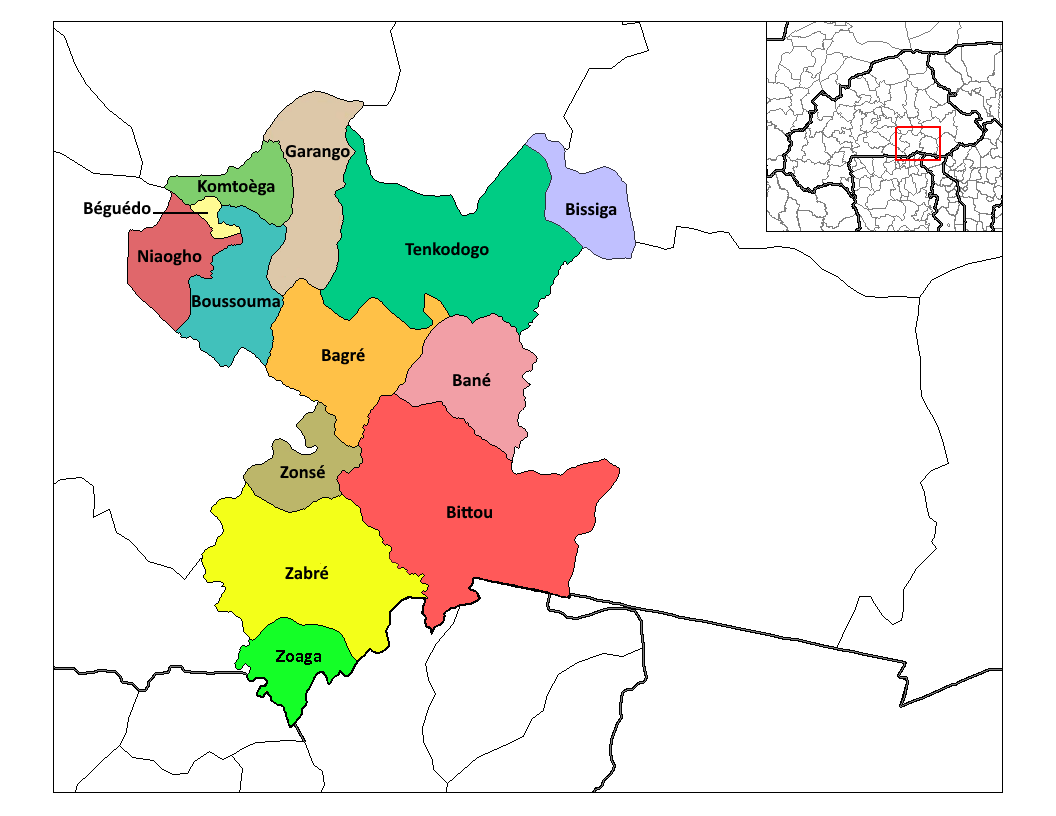
- Bané Department location in the province
- Country: Burkina Faso
- Province: Boulgou Province

Area
  - Total: 174.1 sq mi (451.0 km^{2})

Population (2019 census)
  - Total: 34,507
  - Density: 198.2/sq mi (76.51/km^{2})
- Time zone: UTC+0 (GMT 0)

Bané is a department or commune of Boulgou Province in eastern Burkina Faso. Its capital lies at the town of Bané. According to the 2019 census the department has a total population of 34,507.

== Towns and villages ==
- Bané (1 095 inhabitants) (capital)
- Bantougri (2 964 inhabitants)
- Boumbin (732 inhabitants)
- Dabaré (1 184 inhabitants)
- Dattou (1 280 inhabitants)
- Douré (817 inhabitants)
- Gomin (882 inhabitants)
- Hortougou (250 inhabitants)
- Karema (312 inhabitants)
- Koabgtenga (1 095 inhabitants)
- Léré (684 inhabitants)
- Naï (1 168 inhabitants)
- Nazé (602 inhabitants)
- Ouâda (5 604 inhabitants)
- Oumnoghin (2 118 inhabitants)
- Patin (456 inhabitants)
- Soadin (670 inhabitants)
- Toabin (559 inhabitants)
- Zougbilin (451 inhabitants)
