= Zonsé Department =

Coordinates: 11.355°N 0.635°W

Zonsé
- Department
- Interactive map of Zonsé
- Country: Burkina Faso
- Province: Boulgou Province

Area
  - Total: 94.3 sq mi (244.2 km^{2})

Population (2019 census)
  - Total: 37,327
  - Density: 395.9/sq mi (152.9/km^{2})
- Time zone: UTC+0 (GMT 0)

Zonsé is a department or commune of Boulgou Province in eastern Burkina Faso. Its capital is in the town of Zonsé. According to the 2019 census, the department has a total population of 37,327.

== Towns and villages ==
- Zonsé (1,521 inhabitants) (capital)
- Boutaya (740 inhabitants)
- Diarra-Betongo (870 inhabitants)
- Diella (476 inhabitants)
- Dimvousse (1 238 inhabitants)
- Gnekouneta (175 inhabitants)
- Guiemssim (1 638 inhabitants)
- Kareta (841 inhabitants)
- Korgoreya (424 inhabitants)
- Koungou (821 inhabitants)
- Kourga (2 267 inhabitants)
- Landre (209 inhabitants)
- Litaya (1 099 inhabitants)
- Mangare (441 inhabitants)
- Ponga (3 743 inhabitants)
- Possodo (836 inhabitants)
- Samprabissa (104 inhabitants)
- Sangou-Nazela (71 inhabitants)
- Saoupo (650 inhabitants)
- Soboya (360 inhabitants)
- Soper (727 inhabitants)
- Yerba-Peulh (165 inhabitants)
- Yergoya (500 inhabitants)
