= Goghin, Boulgou =

Goghin Goguin
- Country: Burkina Faso
- Region: Centre-Est Region
- Province: Boulgou Province
- Department: Komtoèga Department

Population (2019)
  - Total: 2,130

Goghin is a town in the Komtoèga Department of Boulgou Province in south-eastern Burkina Faso.

Population
| Year | Pop. | ±% |
|---|---|---|
| 1985 | 663 | — |
| 2006 | 1,415 | +113.4% |
| 2019 | 2,130 | +50.5% |
