= Zoaga =

- Country: Burkina Faso
- Region: Centre-Est Region
- Province: Boulgou Province
- Department: Zoaga Department

Population (2019)
  - Total: 2,039

Zoaga is a town and seat of the Zoaga Department of Boulgou Province in south-eastern Burkina Faso.

Population
Year	Pop.	±%
1985	2,783	—
2006	1,666	−40.1%
2019	2,039	+22.4%
