= Goghin, Bazèga =

Goghin
- Country: Burkina Faso
- Region: Centre-Sud Region
- Province: Bazèga Province
- Department: Kombissiri Department

Population (2019)
  - Total: 1,390

Goghin, Bazèga is a village in the Kombissiri Department of Bazèga Province in central Burkina Faso.

Population
Year	Pop.	±%
1985	317	—
2006	738	+132.8%
2019	1,390	+88.3%
