= Bado (cartoonist) =

Canadian editorial cartoonist

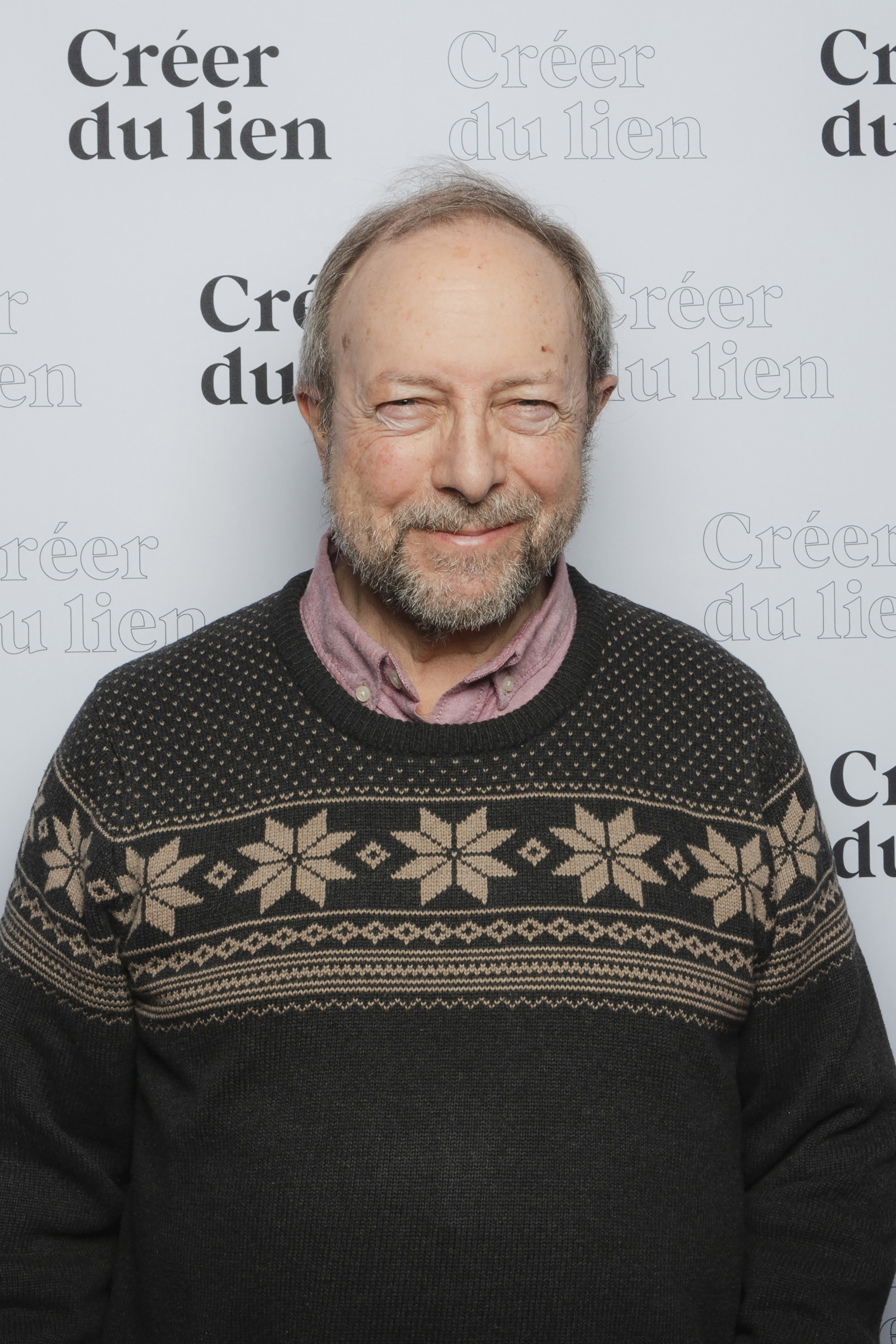
- Guy Badeaux in 2022
- Born: May 21, 1949 (age 77)
- Area: Cartoonist

Bado is the pen name of Guy Badeaux (born 21 May 1949), who has been the editorial cartoonist at the French-language daily Le Droit in Ottawa, Ontario, Canada since 1981. Recipient of the National Newspaper Award for editorial cartooning in 1991, he is currently treasurer of the Association of Canadian Editorial Cartoonists. He was editor, for 23 years, of Portfoolio: The Year's Best Canadian Editorial Cartoons, published by McArthur & Company Publishing, and, for two years, edited by Warren Clements, then with The Globe and Mail.

== Archives ==
There is a Guy Badeaux fonds at Library and Archives Canada. The archival reference number is R5791. The material in the fonds dates from 1981 to 1996. The fonds contains 2,516 drawings and 83 photomechanical reproductions.
