= Sara Goza =

American pediatrician

Sara H. Goza
- Education: Rhodes College and Medical College of Georgia
- Scientific career
- Fields: Pediatrician

Sara H. Goza is an American general pediatrician in Fayetteville, Georgia. She graduated from Rhodes College and received her medical degree at the Medical College of Georgia. Goza's internship and residency were at Cincinnati Children’s Hospital. She began a one-year term as President of the American Academy of Pediatrics (AAP) on January 1, 2020. Goza is a managing partner in First Georgia Physicians Group and sits on the Community Physicians Advisory Board for Children’s Healthcare of Atlanta.

== Career and research ==
Goza completed her internship and residency at Cincinnati Children's Hospital and Medical Center. She was a pediatrician at a clinic but soon expanded her career by moving to a large hospital. In 2015, she created the First Georgia Physicians Group with her colleagues.

== Awards and honors ==
Goza has been a member of the American Academy of Pediatrics for over 20 years. She has contributed to the Board of Directors, Medicaid Task Force, and also served as the chapter president. Currently, she is on the legislative committee, the fall planning group, and the Board of the Pediatric Foundation of Georgia. She also serves on the Community Physicians Advisory Board for Children's Healthcare of Atlanta. Furthermore, she is the 2020 President of the American Academy of Pediatrics and started her one-year term on January 1, 2020.

== Public engagement ==
Goza has served on the Girl Scout Board and has volunteered at Promise Place (a shelter for domestic violence victims) and the Joseph Sams School (a school for children with disabilities). She also helped victims of Hurricanes Maria and Irma get medical help.

== Personal life ==
Goza lives in her childhood home by Goza Lake.
