= South African Modern Pentathlon Association =

Sports governing body in South Africa

- Sport: Modern pentathlon
- Jurisdiction: South Africa
- Abbreviation: SAMPA
- Affiliation: UIPM

Official website
- www.sampasport.co.za
- (South Africa)

South African Modern Pentathlon Association (SAMPA) is the governing body for the sport of modern pentathlon in South Africa recognised by the Union Internationale de Pentathlon Moderne (UIPM). Modern pentathlon of the current era is an Olympic sport that is made up of five events: fencing, freestyle swimming, show jumping, and a final combined event involving laser pistol shooting, and cross-country running.

SAMPA is also affiliated to the Confederation of African Modern Pentathlon (CAPM) and the South African Sports Confederation and Olympic Committee (SASCOC).

The developing sports of tetrathlon, biathle, triathle and laser-run are under the control of SAMPA. Athletes compete from provincial level to the national level at various age groups with the aim of representing SAMPA or South Africa at UIMP World Championship events

== See also ==
- Sport in South Africa
