= Kabri, Panipat =

Village in state of Haryana, India

Kabri
- Country: India

Population
  - Total: 7,049
- Time zone: UTC+05:30 (IST)

Kabri is one of the villages in Panipat district of Haryana, India, located nearly 5 kilometres (3.1 mi) north-west of the main town, Panipat. It is also 2.8 kilometres (1.7 mi) from National Highway 44, one of the major roads of India.

The most populous groups are from the Gurjar and Brahmin and Sikh communities but there are many others represented.
