= Gounghin, Ganzourgou =

Gounghin
- Country: Burkina Faso
- Region: Plateau-Central Region
- Province: Ganzourgou
- Department: Boudry Department

Population (2019)
  - Total: 1,863

Gounghin is a village in the Boudry Department of Ganzourgou Province in central Burkina Faso.

Population
Year	Pop.	±%
1985	1,162	—
2006	908	−21.9%
2019	1,863	+105.2%
