= Tenkodogo =

- City
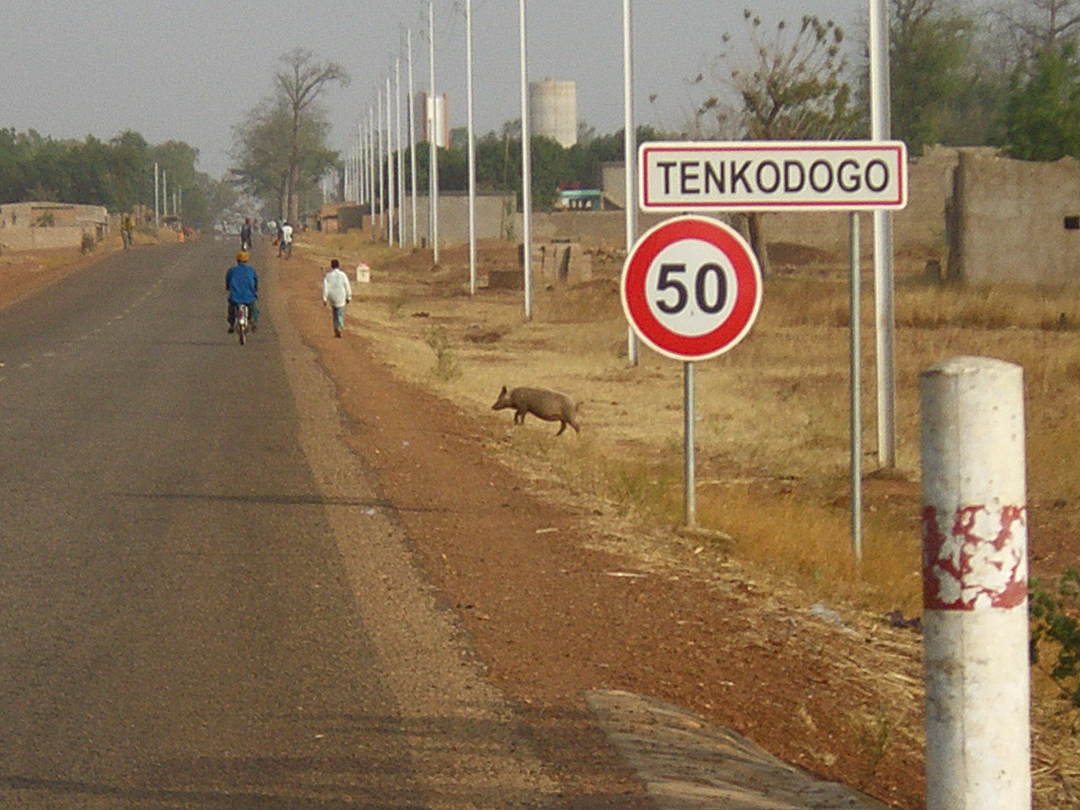
- Entrance to Tenkodogo

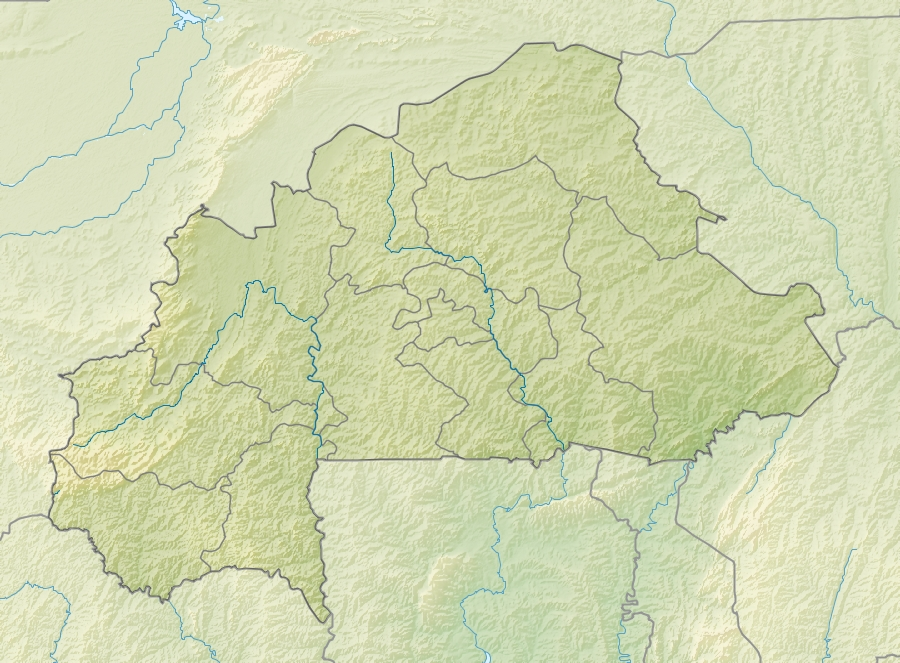
- Location within Burkina Faso
- Coordinates: 11°47′10″N 0°21′55″W
- Country: Burkina Faso
- Region: Nakambé Region
- Province: Boulgou Province
- Department: Tenkodogo Department
- Elevation: 304 m (996 ft)

Population (2019 census)
  - Total: 61,936
- Time zone: UTC+00:00 (GMT)

Tenkodogo is a town in southeastern Burkina Faso. It serves as the capital city of Boulgou Province and the Nakambé Region of Burkina Faso with a population of 61,936 (2019). Tenkodogo was also the capital of the historic Tenkodogo Bissa-Mossi origin and considered to be root of all other Mossi Kingdoms, having been founded circa 1100. The literal translation of Tenkodogo is ancient-land.

== Economy ==
The villages surrounding Tenkodogo are primarily based around animal husbandry.

The main market takes place every 3 days.

Notable hotels include Hotel Djamou, Hotel Djamou Annexe, Hotel Laafi, and Auberge Riale.

== Politics ==
On 29 January 2016, the king of Tenkodogo, Naba Saga, died while in Thailand for hospital care. He was the 28th king of Tenkodogo according to tradition and was inducted on 5 October 2001. He had taken the position after the death of his father, Naba Tigre, in September 2001. He was succeeded by Naba Guiguem-Pollé as king.

== Transport ==
The town is connected to Koupéla and Bittou, along the N15 highway.

Companies such as STAF, TSF, TSR, TCV and many more provide multiple daily services to Ouagadougou.

Tenkodogo is approximately 185 kilometres (115 mi) from Ouagadougou and it takes about 3h30min by vehicle.

== Development ==
In the period leading up to the 2019 edition of 11 Dècembre festivity, Tenkodogo had a massive improvement to its road network. Multiple roads and roundabouts were asphalted making movements within the city much faster. Tenkodogo also had the removal of its dirt runway to make way for the 11 Dècembre neighbourhood (colloquially known as "Cité 11 Decémbre") which is full of modern villas and houses.

== Royal Family ==
The headquarters of the royal family is located within the Palais Royal de Tenkodogo (colloquially known as Na-Yiri in Mooré language) located at a close proximity to the market (Marchè de Tenkodogo or Tenkodogo Daassi or Raaga in both BISSA and Mooré languages respectively).The second in command of the Tenkodogo chieftaincy or prime minister is Kere family.

The current head of the family is His Majesty King Naba Guiguem-Pollé and Kiir BIDIMPOO as his second in command, King of the Kingdom of Tenkodogo and Rima of BISSAKO (RIALEKOU).

The majority of descendants of the royal family carry the surname Sorgho and they are colloquially known as the naabisi (royals) of the city.

The royal family are still a key figure in the city and they still mediate over land or family disputes in the city.

== Climate ==
Köppen-Geiger climate classification system classifies its climate as hot semi-arid (BSh) that closely borders with tropical wet and dry (Aw).

Climate data for Tenkodogo
Month	Jan	Feb	Mar	Apr	May	Jun	Jul	Aug	Sep	Oct	Nov	Dec	Year
Mean daily maximum °C (°F)	34.2 (93.6)	35.9 (96.6)	38.9 (102.0)	39.2 (102.6)	36.5 (97.7)	33.9 (93.0)	31.5 (88.7)	30.4 (86.7)	31.6 (88.9)	34.7 (94.5)	36 (97)	34.4 (93.9)	34.8 (94.6)
Daily mean °C (°F)	26.5 (79.7)	28.6 (83.5)	31.5 (88.7)	32.4 (90.3)	30.5 (86.9)	28.4 (83.1)	26.7 (80.1)	25.9 (78.6)	26.5 (79.7)	28.4 (83.1)	28.2 (82.8)	26.6 (79.9)	28.4 (83.0)
Mean daily minimum °C (°F)	19.8 (67.6)	21.3 (70.3)	24.1 (75.4)	25.6 (78.1)	24.6 (76.3)	23 (73)	21.9 (71.4)	21.4 (70.5)	21.4 (70.5)	22.1 (71.8)	20.4 (68.7)	18.8 (65.8)	22.0 (71.6)
Average precipitation mm (inches)	1 (0.0)	3 (0.1)	11 (0.4)	26 (1.0)	79 (3.1)	110 (4.3)	177 (7.0)	243 (9.6)	150 (5.9)	35 (1.4)	1 (0.0)	2 (0.1)	838 (32.9)
Source: Climate-Data.org, elevation: 309 m

== Demographics ==
Year	Population
1985	23,331
1996	31,466
2006	44,491

== See also ==
- List of cities in Burkina Faso
