= Boulgou Province =

Boulgou
- Province
- Location in Burkina Faso

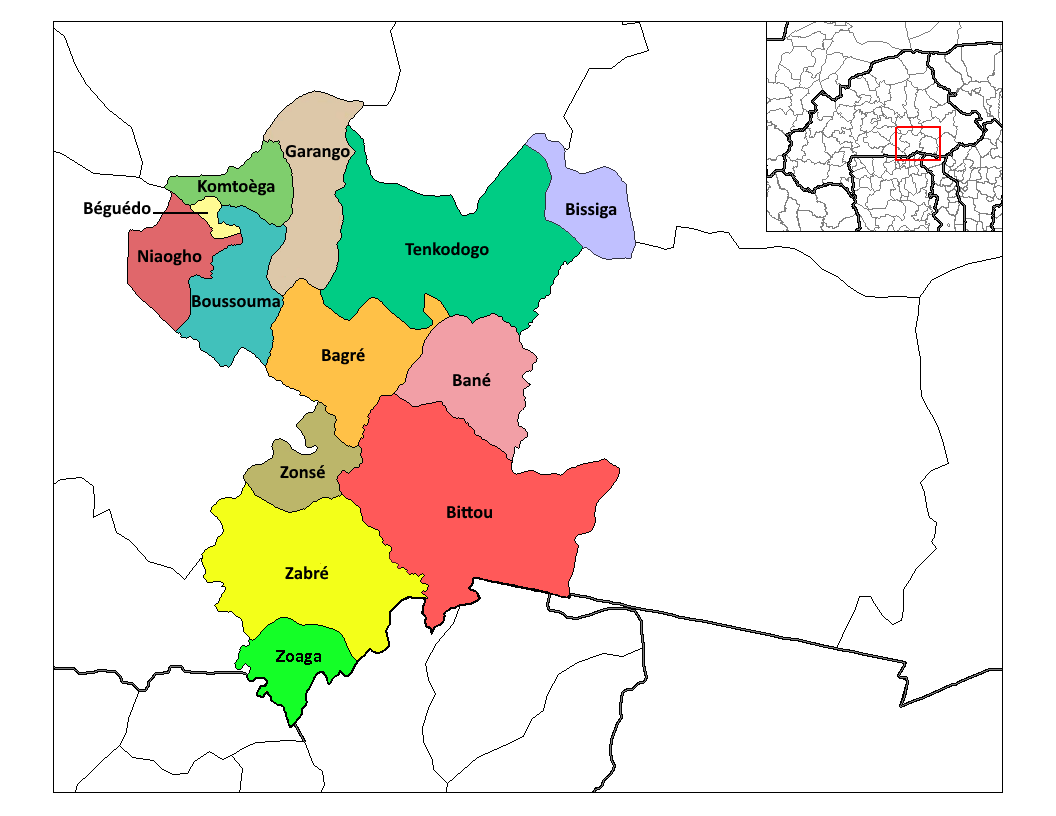
- Provincial map of its departments
- Coordinates: 11°30′N 0°30′W
- Country: Burkina Faso
- Region: Centre-Est Region
- Capital: Tenkodogo

Area
  - Province: 6,687 km^{2} (2,582 sq mi)

Population (2019 census)
  - Province: 737,843
  - Density: 110.3/km^{2} (285.8/sq mi)
  - Urban: 133,553
- Time zone: UTC+0 (GMT 0)
- ISO 3166 code: BF-BLG

Boulgou is one of the 45 provinces of Burkina Faso and is in Centre-Est Region. The capital of Boulgou is Tenkodogo. The population of Boulgou in 2019 was 737,843.

== Demographics ==
Historical population
Year	Pop.	±%
1985	332,920	—
1996	415,583	+24.8%
2006	543,570	+30.8%
2019	737,843	+35.7%

As of 2019, 54.2% of the population is female and 45.8% is male. 46.4% is under 14 years old, 49.4% are between 14 and 64 years of age and only 4.1% of the population is aged 65 or more.

== Departments ==
The province of Boulgou is divided into 13 departments.

The 13 departments of Boulgou Province
Departments	Communes	Population (Census 2013)
Bagré Department	Bagré	29,328
Bané Department	Bané	24,541
Béguédo Department	Béguédo	19,665
Bissiga Department	Bissiga	21,228
Bittou Department	Bittou	70,760
Boussouma Department	Boussouma	26,473
Garango Department	Garango	71,408
Komtoèga Department	Komtoèga	20,126
Niaogho Department	Niaogho	19,091
Tenkodogo Department	Tenkodogo	124,053
Zabré Department	Zabré	84,728
Zoaga Department	Zoaga	10,892
Zonsé Department	Zonsé	19,993

See also:

- Regions of Burkina Faso
- Provinces of Burkina Faso
- Communes of Burkina Faso
