= Namoukouka =

Village in Burkina Faso

- Location within Burkina Faso
- Coordinates: 12°09′27.76″N 0°05′14.95″W
- Country: Burkina Faso
- Province: Kouritenga
- Department: Gounghin
- Elevation: 335 m (1,099 ft)

Population (2006)
  - Total: 810
- Time zone: UTC+0 (GMT)

Namoukouka is a village in the Gounghin Department of Kouritenga Province in the Centre-Est region of Burkina Faso. It had a population of 810 in 2006.

An association between the French city of Nice and Namoukouka exists under the name "Laagm-Taaba" which was originally setup in the city of Koupéla in 2012 to aid the young people of Namoukouka to purchase footballs to play football with. Subsequently, a football club and annual tournament was established in which the local people, mainly farmers and breeders, participate. The association has also carried out agricultural aid work.

The Laagm-Taaba association reports that Namoukouka faces emigration of young people to the capital, Ouagadougou, in particular because of a low prospect of employment outside the agricultural sector, basic comfort and a lack of entertainment. Namoukouka does not contain a running water system and has not been electrified.

== Geography ==
=== Location ===
Namoukouka is located 200 km east of Ouagadougou, the capital of Burkina Faso. It covers an area of about 8 km^{2}.

It is one of the 43 administrative villages of the department of Gounghin in the province of Kourittenga in the Centre-Est region of Burkina Faso.

It is about 1 km from the department capital Gounghin on the old Koupéla-Fada road and is bounded to the east by the villages of Natinga, Belemsaghin and the Fada region 45 km away, to the west by the villages of Kabega, Dapelogo and the city of Koupela 35 km away, to the north by the villages of Yarkanre and Banogo and to the south by the villages of Wobzoughin and Doimtinga. Namoukouka is composed of 5 districts as of 2014 instead of the 4 listed in the 2006 census, as reported at the time by the President of Laagm-Taaba in Burkina Faso Alfred Tougma.

=== Physical geography ===
The terrain is somewhat monotonous with large expanses of lowlands throughout the centre. Elevations are observed in some places. Throughout Namoukouka, the soils are lateritic, clayey and sandy, upon which several types of crops are grown. There is a distribution of crop types according to soil types in Namoukouka.

Soil type	Crop type
Lateritic	millet, cowpea, sorghum, sesame
Clayey	rice, corn, sorghum
Sandy	peanut, earth pea, millet

== Demographics ==
Year	Population
1985	804
1996	928
2006	810

=== Neighbourhoods ===
Neighbourhood	Population (2006)
Kasoulyorghin	162
Kiniraboghin	121
Namoukouka	243
Tanbinsinghin	284
