= Belemboulghin =

Commune in Burkina Faso

- Location within Burkina Faso
- Coordinates: 12°08′08.49″N 0°03′43.59″W
- Country: Burkina Faso
- Province: Kouritenga
- Department: Gounghin
- Elevation: 320 m (1,050 ft)

Population (2006)
  - Total: 1,350
- Time zone: UTC+0 (GMT)

Belemboulghin, also spelt Belemboulgui, is a commune in the Gounghin Department of Kouritenga Province in the Centre-Est region of Burkina Faso. It had a population of 1,350 in 2006.

According to a map by the European Commission's "Intelligent Energy - Europe" programme, Belemboulghin is located in the same place as Belembaoghin, and both are likely suburbs of the capital of the department, Gounghin.

== Demographics ==
Year	Population
1985	695
1996	1,104
2006	1,350

=== Neighbourhoods ===
Neighbourhood	Population (2006)
Belemboulghin	-
Dogdyogden	-
Gadbin	-
Tantaghin	-
Waongtenga	-
Yogbokin	-
