= Boumdoudoum =

- Location within Burkina Faso
- Coordinates: 12°12′N 0°16′W
- Country: Burkina Faso
- Province: Kouritenga
- Department: Baskouré
- Elevation: 306 m (1,004 ft)

Population (2006)
  - Total: 413
- Time zone: UTC+0 (GMT)

Boumdoudoum, also spelt Boundoudoum or Boudoudoum, is a village in the Baskouré Department of Kouritenga Province in the Centre-Est region of Burkina Faso. It had a population of 413 in 2006.

Beginning in 2004, New High School (de) in Oldenburg, Germany has been in a partnership with a village school of Boumdoudoum. The high school founded the organisations of Boumdoudoum AG in 2005 and the Boumdoudoum Development Association in 2007 to organise its operations in the village, as well as development aid projects at the high school itself.

== Economy ==
In 2004, the Oldenburg-Boumdoudoum partnership reported that there were 3 wells in the village, 21 families sharing a well each. A few families had a plough pulled by donkey or oxen. Besides agriculture, cattle farming was also being done.

== Housing ==
A typical housing collective in Boumdoudoum consists of several round houses of clay with thatched roofs. The houses are connected with clay walls or straw mats and enclose an inner courtyard. In the courtyard there is a small house. In the huts, family members sleep on the floor in groups of the same sex and social hierarchy. Belongings are stored on the floor of the huts or hung on a cord.

== Education ==
The village has a primary school, l'École de Boumdoudoum, which in 2004 supported 52 pupils. The construction of a school kitchen and multimedia building in the school had been initiated in part by the Boumdoudoum Development Association.

There are no secondary schools; the closest one is in Baskouré, 2 to 5 km away, the Collège d'enseignement général de Baskouré.

== Demographics ==
As of 2004, 64 families lived in the village.

Year	Population
1996	368
2006	413

=== Neighbourhoods ===
Neighbourhood	Population (2006)
Balemmin	111
Natenga	105
Souka	101
Yarsin	95
