= Ouedogo =

Ouedogo may refer to several settlements in Burkina Faso:

- Ouédogo-Bokin, a town in Gounghin Department, Kouritenga Province
- Ouedogo, Sangha, a town in Sangha Department, Koulpélogo Province
- Ouédogo, Koupéla, a village in Koupéla Department, Kouritenga Province
