= Somdabésma =

Commune in Burkina Faso

- Country: Burkina Faso
- Province: Kouritenga
- Department: Andemtenga

Population (2006)
  - Total: 322
- Time zone: UTC+0 (GMT)

Somdabésma, also spelt Somdabesma, is a commune in the Andemtenga Department of Kouritenga Province in the Centre-Est region of Burkina Faso. It had a population of 322 in 2006.

In the 2006 census, Somdabésma was included as a neighbourhood of Andemtenga but was also listed as a separate settlement.

== Demographics ==
Year	Population
1996	-
2006	322

Neighbourhood	Population (2006)
Natenga	-
Passimnoghin	-
Rassambin	-
Wedenghin	-
