= Tantako =

- Location within Burkina Faso, French West Africa
- Coordinates: 12°14′06.16″N 0°14′12.52″W
- Country: Burkina Faso
- Province: Kouritenga
- Department: Andemtenga
- Elevation: 305 m (1,001 ft)

Population (2006)
  - Total: 1,749
- Time zone: UTC+0 (GMT)

Tantako is a commune in the Andemtenga Department of Kouritenga Province in the Centre-Est region of Burkina Faso. It had a population of 1,749 in 2006.

== Demographics ==
Year	Population
1985	1,125
1996	1,824
2006	1,749

=== Neighbourhoods ===
Neighbourhood	Population (2006)
Bagrin	141
Natenga	224
Sambin	75
Sanlakoliré	77
Silminabin	49
Sobghin	89
Solgomnoré	216
Tamissi	214
Widi	78
Yembollin	440
Zaoghin	147
