= Boulga =

- Location within Burkina Faso, French West Africa
- Coordinates: 11°51′13.56″N 0°18′45.75″W
- Country: Burkina Faso
- Province: Kouritenga
- Department: Dialgaye
- Elevation: 310 m (1,020 ft)

Population (2006)
  - Total: 1,051
- Time zone: UTC+0 (GMT)

Boulga is a commune in the Dialgaye Department of Kouritenga Province in the Centre-Est region of Burkina Faso. It had a population of 2,115 in 2006.

In the 2006 census, one of Boulga's neighbourhoods, Kamsagho, also spelt Kamsaogho, was listed as a separate settlement with a population of 1,064, with Boulga's population as 1,051. This would give the combined Boulga-Kamsaogho settlement a total population of 2,115 in 2006. This population division differs from the divisions in the neighbourhood data, however the total population of all of the neighbourhoods also comes to 2,115.

== Demographics ==
Year	Population
1996	2,027
2006	2,115

=== Neighbourhoods ===
Neighbourhood	Population (2006)
Kamsagho	750
Natenga	691
Sampoudgo	674
