= Passem-Noguin =

Commune in Burkina Faso

- Location within Burkina Faso, French West Africa
- Coordinates: 11°57.2′N 0°22.3′W
- Country: Burkina Faso
- Province: Kouritenga
- Department: Dialgaye
- Elevation: 284 m (932 ft)

Population (2006)
  - Total: 481
- Time zone: UTC+0 (GMT)

Passem-Noguin, also spelt Passemnoguin, is a commune in the Dialgaye Department of Kouritenga Province in the Centre-Est region of Burkina Faso. It had a population of 1,653 in 2006.

In the 2006 census, one of Passem-Noguin's neighbourhoods, Soubga, was listed as a separate settlement with a population of 1,172, with Passem-Noguin's population as 481. This would give the combined Passem-Noguin-Soubga settlement a total population of 1,653 in 2006. This population division differs from the divisions in the neighbourhood data, however the total population of all of the neighbourhoods also comes to 1,653.

== Demographics ==
Year	Population
1985	1,211
1996	1,530
2006	1,653

=== Neighbourhoods ===
Neighbourhood	Population (2006)
Gonkin	310
Passimnoghin	723
Soubga	620
