= Winga =

Winga may refer to:

- Anadyr (town), a town in Chukotka Autonomous Okrug, Russia
- Ouenga, a commune in Centre-Est Region, Burkina Faso
- Winga, an Italian online gambling platform acquired by LeoVegas
