= Sankouissi, Gounghin =

Commune in Burkina Faso

Sankouissi
- Location within Burkina Faso, French West Africa
- Coordinates: 12°02′39.58″N 0°10′51.35″W
- Country: Burkina Faso
- Province: Kouritenga
- Department: Gounghin
- Elevation: 325 m (1,066 ft)

Population (2006)
  - Total: 245
- Time zone: UTC+0 (GMT)

Sankouissi is a commune in the Gounghin Department of Kouritenga Province in the Centre-Est region of Burkina Faso. It had a population of 245 in 2006.

== Demographics ==
Year	Population
1985	142
1996	230
2006	245

=== Neighbourhoods ===
Neighbourhood	Population (2006)
Sankouissin	111
Sawatin	59
Tekondin	76
