= Bonsin-Dagoule =

- Country: Burkina Faso
- Province: Kouritenga
- Department: Gounghin

Population (2006)
  - Total: 2,133
- Time zone: UTC+0 (GMT)

Bonsin-Dagoule, also spelled Bonsin Dagoule, is a commune in the Gounghin Department of Kouritenga Province in the Centre-Est region of Burkina Faso. It had a population of 2,133 in 2006.

== Demographics ==
Year	Population
1985	969
1996	1,490
2006	2,133

=== Neighbourhoods ===
Neighbourhood	Population (2006)
Boulgueghin	525
Dagoule	301
Gounguin	180
Natenga	451
Nintaore	676
