= Doundoudougou =

Commune in Burkina Faso

- Location within Burkina Faso, West Africa
- Coordinates: 12°22′44.3″N 0°21′08.7″W
- Country: Burkina Faso
- Province: Kouritenga
- Department: Andemtenga
- Elevation: 310 m (1,020 ft)

Population (2006)
  - Total: 4,535
- Time zone: UTC+0 (GMT)

Doundoudougou is a commune in the Andemtenga Department of Kouritenga Province in the Centre-Est region of Burkina Faso. It had a population of 4,535 in 2006.

== Demographics ==
Year	Population
1985	1,054
1996	4,811
2006	4,535

=== Neighbourhoods ===
Neighbourhood	Population (2006)
Natenga	763
Oualboulghin	441
Oumnoghin	764
Toemissin	376
Zamsé	2,191
