= Sitenga =

- Location within Burkina Faso, French West Africa
- Coordinates: 12°06′21.20″N 0°11′26.45″W
- Country: Burkina Faso
- Province: Kouritenga
- Department: Gounghin
- Elevation: 332 m (1,089 ft)

Population (2006)
  - Total: 467
- Time zone: UTC+0 (GMT)

Sitenga is a commune in the Gounghin Department of Kouritenga Province in the Centre-Est region of Burkina Faso. It had a population of 467 in 2006.

== Demographics ==
Year	Population
1985	250
1996	459
2006	467

=== Neighbourhoods ===
Neighbourhood	Population (2006)
Natenga	292
Sitenbili	175
