= Tambella Mossi =

- Location within Burkina Faso, French West Africa
- Coordinates: 12°24′31.02″N 0°20′12.53″W
- Country: Burkina Faso
- Province: Kouritenga
- Department: Andemtenga
- Elevation: 307 m (1,007 ft)

Population (2006)
  - Total: 1,929
- Time zone: UTC+0 (GMT)

Tambella Mossi, also spelt Tambiella Mossi or Tambella-Mossi, is a commune in the Andemtenga Department of Kouritenga Province in the Centre-Est region of Burkina Faso. It had a population of 1,929 in 2006.

== Demographics ==
Year	Population
1985	1,546
1996	2,131
2006	1,929

=== Neighbourhoods ===
Neighbourhood	Population (2006)
Boundoudougou	184
Douré	270
Kolingwendé	159
Kombi	278
Kosnatenga	167
Kouakoka	215
Moinbin	106
Nabasnoghin	263
Natenga	286
