= Dakonsin, Gounghin =

Commune in Burkina Faso

Dakonsin
- Location within Burkina Faso
- Coordinates: 12°08′45.90″N 0°03′03.39″W
- Country: Burkina Faso
- Province: Kouritenga
- Department: Gounghin
- Elevation: 329 m (1,079 ft)

Population (2006)
  - Total: 696
- Time zone: UTC+0 (GMT)

Dakonsin, also spelt Dakosem, is a commune in the Gounghin Department of Kouritenga Province in the Centre-Est region of Burkina Faso. It had a population of 696 in 2006.

== Demographics ==
Year	Population
1985	734
1996	733
2006	696

=== Neighbourhoods ===
Neighbourhood	Population (2006)
Dagiosbtenga	246
Gandentenga	82
Ganyestenga	123
Natenga	164
Waogtenga	82
