= Dagamtenga Peulh =

Commune in Burkina Faso

- Location within Burkina Faso
- Coordinates: 11°52′33.56″N 0°22′15.46″W
- Country: Burkina Faso
- Province: Kouritenga
- Department: Dialgaye
- Elevation: 312 m (1,024 ft)

Population (2006)
  - Total: 180
- Time zone: UTC+0 (GMT)

Dagamtenga Peulh, also called Dagemtenga 2, is a commune in the Dialgaye Department of Kouritenga Province in the Centre-Est region of Burkina Faso. It had a population of 180 in 2006.

== Demographics ==
Year	Population
1996	121
2006	180

=== Neighbourhoods ===
Neighbourhood	Population (2006)
Dagamtenga Peulh	180
