= Loanga, Dialgaye =

Commune in Burkina Faso

Loanga
- Location within Burkina Faso, French West Africa
- Coordinates: 11°56.5′N 0°24.25′W
- Country: Burkina Faso
- Province: Kouritenga
- Department: Dialgaye
- Elevation: 297 m (974 ft)

Population (2006)
  - Total: 351
- Time zone: UTC+0 (GMT)

Loanga is a commune in the Dialgaye Department of Kouritenga Province in the Centre-Est region of Burkina Faso. It had a population of 351 in 2006.

== Demographics ==
Year	Population
1985	309
1996	472
2006	351

=== Neighbourhoods ===
Neighbourhood	Population (2006)
Loanaga	351
