= Dagbilin =

Commune in Burkina Faso

- Location within Burkina Faso
- Coordinates: 12°09′49.08″N 0°10′00.83″W
- Country: Burkina Faso
- Province: Kouritenga
- Department: Gounghin
- Elevation: 324 m (1,063 ft)

Population (2006)
  - Total: 586
- Time zone: UTC+0 (GMT)

Dagbilin is a commune in the Gounghin Department of Kouritenga Province in the Centre-Est region of Burkina Faso. It had a population of 586 in 2006.

== Demographics ==
Year	Population
1996	668
2006	586

=== Neighbourhoods ===
Neighbourhood	Population (2006)
Goumbilin	86
Kanlebtenga	172
Tanboghin	119
Tanpoudin	172
Yarsin	37
