= Lioulgou =

Commune in Burkina Faso

- Location within Burkina Faso, French West Africa
- Coordinates: 12°00.4′N 0°21.9′W
- Country: Burkina Faso
- Province: Kouritenga
- Department: Dialgaye
- Elevation: 285 m (935 ft)

Population (2006)
  - Total: 2,482
- Time zone: UTC+0 (GMT)

Lioulgou is a commune in the Dialgaye Department of Kouritenga Province in the Centre-Est region of Burkina Faso. It had a population of 2,482 in 2006.

== Demographics ==
Year	Population
1985	1,645
1996	2,267
2006	2,482

=== Neighbourhoods ===
Neighbourhood	Population (2006)
Bangrin	366
Dassamé	178
Kienkiaghin	204
Kolkomin	183
Kouyamé	407
Natenga	305
Nayamé	152
Nooghin	229
Saabin	204
Soupsiguin	254
