= Nioughin =

Commune in Burkina Faso

- Location within Burkina Faso, French West Africa
- Coordinates: 12°15′40.81″N 0°06′48.18″W
- Country: Burkina Faso
- Province: Kouritenga
- Department: Gounghin
- Elevation: 314 m (1,030 ft)

Population (2006)
  - Total: 295
- Time zone: UTC+0 (GMT)

Nioughin is a commune in the Gounghin Department of Kouritenga Province in the Centre-Est region of Burkina Faso. It had a population of 987 in 2006.

== Demographics ==
Year	Population
1985	820
1996	954
2006	987

=== Neighbourhoods ===
Neighbourhood	Population (2006)
Dapotenga	181
Gombilin	142
Komaviorin	187
Lagbendin	129
Natenga	193
Sambin	155
