= Belembaoghin =

- Location within Burkina Faso, French West Africa
- Coordinates: 12°08′08.49″N 0°03′43.59″W
- Country: Burkina Faso
- Province: Kouritenga
- Department: Gounghin
- Elevation: 320 m (1,050 ft)

Population (2006)
  - Total: 522
- Time zone: UTC+0 (GMT)

Belembaoghin, also spelt Belembaghin, Belmbaghin or Bélembaoguen, is a commune in the Gounghin Department of Kouritenga Province in the Centre-Est region of Burkina Faso. It had a population of 522 in 2006.

According to a map by the European Commission's "Intelligent Energy - Europe" programme, Belembaoghin is located in the same place as Belemboulghin, and both are likely suburbs of the capital of the department, Gounghin.

== Demographics ==
Year	Population
1985	441
1996	514
2006	522

=== Neighbourhoods ===
Neighbourhood	Population (2006)
Belembonghin	256
Belemsagha	107
Sirbtenga	159
