= Boundoudoum-Zougo =

Commune in Burkina Faso

- Location within Burkina Faso
- Coordinates: 12°12′36.16″N 0°04′27.65″W
- Country: Burkina Faso
- Province: Kouritenga
- Department: Gounghin
- Elevation: 311 m (1,020 ft)

Population (2006)
  - Total: 650
- Time zone: UTC+0 (GMT)

Boundoudoum-Zougo, also spelt Bondoudoumi-Zougo and also called Boundoudoun, is a commune in the Gounghin Department of Kouritenga Province in the Centre-Est region of Burkina Faso. It had a population of 650 in 2006.

== Demographics ==
| Year | Population |
|---|---|
| 1985 | 896 |
| 1996 | 622 |
| 2006 | 650 |

=== Neighbourhoods ===
| Neighbourhood | Population (2006) |
|---|---|
| Dagoibstenga | 102 |
| Doure | 144 |
| Goghin | 157 |
| Natenga | 123 |
| Tampoudin | 123 |
