= Sabrouko =

- Location within Burkina Faso, French West Africa
- Coordinates: 12°15′29.2″N 0°14′42.9″W
- Country: Burkina Faso
- Province: Kouritenga
- Department: Andemtenga
- Elevation: 299 m (981 ft)

Population (2006)
  - Total: 288
- Time zone: UTC+0 (GMT)

Sabrouko is a commune in the Andemtenga Department of Kouritenga Province in the Centre-Est region of Burkina Faso. It had a population of 288 in 2006.

== Demographics ==
Year	Population
1985	609
1996	267
2006	288

=== Neighbourhoods ===
Neighbourhood	Population (2006)
Biharotin	88
Natenga	111
Wayalghin	88
