= Zeguedega =

- Location within Burkina Faso, French West Africa
- Coordinates: 11°55.2′N 0°22.25′W
- Country: Burkina Faso
- Province: Kouritenga
- Department: Dialgaye
- Elevation: 292 m (958 ft)

Population (2006)
  - Total: 1,786
- Time zone: UTC+0 (GMT)

Zeguedega, also spelt Zeguedéga, is a commune in the Dialgaye Department of Kouritenga Province in the Centre-Est region of Burkina Faso. It had a population of 1,786 in 2006.

== Demographics ==
| Year | Population |
|---|---|
| 1985 | 1,042 |
| 1996 | 1,409 |
| 2006 | 1,786 |

=== Neighbourhoods ===
| Neighbourhood | Population (2006) |
|---|---|
| Bawognoré | 241 |
| Gangaolillé | 87 |
| Gnouli | 109 |
| Kuidbin | 219 |
| Natenga | 602 |
| Paulin | 99 |
| Ropalin | 99 |
| Sambin | 99 |
| Tuinligatenga | 231 |
