= Tambella Peulh =

- Location within Burkina Faso, French West Africa
- Coordinates: 12°23′56.50″N 0°20′15.10″W
- Country: Burkina Faso
- Province: Kouritenga
- Department: Andemtenga
- Elevation: 307 m (1,007 ft)

Population (2006)
  - Total: 186
- Time zone: UTC+0 (GMT)

Tambella Peulh, also spelt Tambella-Peulh, is a commune in the Andemtenga Department of Kouritenga Province in the Centre-Est region of Burkina Faso. It had a population of 186 in 2006.

== Demographics ==
Year	Population
1996	65
2006	186

=== Neighbourhoods ===
Neighbourhood	Population (2006)
Natenga	186
