= Sambraoghin =

- Location within Burkina Faso, French West Africa
- Coordinates: 12°10′N 0°13′W
- Country: Burkina Faso
- Province: Kouritenga
- Department: Baskouré
- Elevation: 315 m (1,033 ft)

Population (2006)
  - Total: 1,124
- Time zone: UTC+0 (GMT)

Sambraoghin is a commune in the Baskouré Department of Kouritenga Province in the Centre-Est region of Burkina Faso. It had a population of 1,124 in 2006.

In the 1985 census, one of Sambraoghin's neighbourhoods, Sambraobilin, was listed as a separate settlement with a population of 92.

== Demographics ==
| Year | Population |
|---|---|
| 1985 | 261 |
| 1996 | 1,048 |
| 2006 | 1,124 |

=== Neighbourhoods ===
| Neighbourhood | Population (2006) |
|---|---|
| Banggoamin | 132 |
| Nabasnoghin | 127 |
| Namasroumdin | 114 |
| Natenga | 136 |
| Ouagotenga | 127 |
| Rabosgomdin | 123 |
| Sambraobilin | 122 |
| Signoghin | 120 |
| Tambissimin | 123 |
