= Tensobentenga Department =

Coordinates: 12°0′N 0°16′W

Tensobentenga
- Department
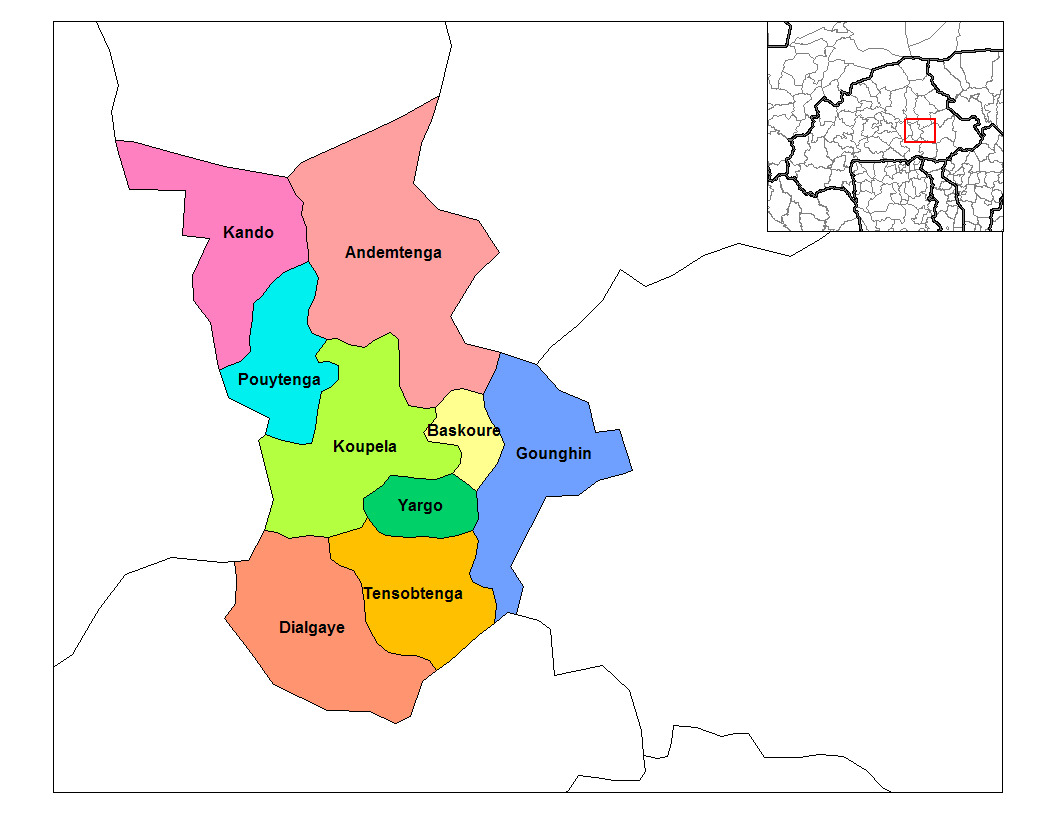
- Tensobentenga Department location in the province
- Country: Burkina Faso
- Province: Kouritenga Province

Area
  - Total: 103.1 sq mi (267.0 km^{2})

Population (2019 census)
  - Total: 25,887
  - Density: 251.1/sq mi (96.96/km^{2})
- Time zone: UTC+0 (GMT 0)

Tensobentenga is a department or commune of Kouritenga Province in eastern Burkina Faso. Its capital lies at the town of Tensobentenga . According to the 2019 census the department has a total population of 25,887.

== Towns and villages ==
- Tensobentenga (1 462 inhabitants) (capital)
- Dakonsin (786 inhabitants)
- Bogodin (123 inhabitants)
- Doubguin (517 inhabitants)
- Doure Yarcé (676 inhabitants)
- Goguin (354 inhabitants)
- Gonsin (1 049 inhabitants)
- Kombestenga (1 156 inhabitants)
- Koulwoko (2 187 inhabitants)
- Naikin (931 inhabitants)
- Naobin (279 inhabitants)
- Nédoguin (308 inhabitants)
- Ouamzalin (339 inhabitants)
- Pistenga (204 inhabitants)
- Setebtenga (232 inhabitants)
- Silgtéogo (984 inhabitants)
- Simpiguin (482 inhabitants)
- Soansa (516 inhabitants)
- Soumdi (756 inhabitants)
- Tampialin (543 inhabitants)
- Timtenga (813 inhabitants)
- Tougmetenga (962 inhabitants)
- Toutgoguin (898 inhabitants)
- Yabré (613 inhabitants)
- Zéologuin (1 282 inhabitants)
- Zomkome (295 inhabitants)

Tensobentenga centre est composer d'habitant très réligieux (Musulmans et chrétiens). Situer à 25 kilometres (16 mi) de Koupéla vers le sud.
