= Guéfourgou =

Commune in Burkina Faso

- Location within Burkina Faso, West Africa
- Coordinates: 12°23′56.8″N 0°13′38.8″W
- Country: Burkina Faso
- Province: Kouritenga
- Department: Andemtenga
- Elevation: 299 m (981 ft)

Population (2006)
  - Total: 3,450
- Time zone: UTC+0 (GMT)

Guéfourgou is a commune in the Andemtenga Department of Kouritenga Province in the Centre-Est region of Burkina Faso. It had a population of 3,450 in 2006.

== Demographics ==
Year	Population
1985	710
1996	1,923
2006	3,450

=== Neighbourhoods ===
Neighbourhood	Population (2006)
Ginkoromé	569
Iranim	411
Kogré	318
Koudoughin	192
Nabousnonghin	296
Natinga	531
Tamosghin	223
Tanbinighin	266
Wapassi	479
Wobtoéga	165
