= Oualogo =

- Location within Burkina Faso, French West Africa
- Coordinates: 12°09′N 0°14′W
- Country: Burkina Faso
- Province: Kouritenga
- Department: Baskouré
- Elevation: 313 m (1,027 ft)

Population (2006)
  - Total: 727
- Time zone: UTC+0 (GMT)

Oualogo, also spelt Oualgo, is a commune in the Baskouré Department of Kouritenga Province in the Centre-Est region of Burkina Faso. It had a population of 727 in 2006.

In the 1985 census, a related settlement known as Oualogo-Peulh was described as having a population of 132.

== Demographics ==
Year	Population
1985	317
1996	479
2006	727

=== Neighbourhoods ===
Neighbourhood	Population (2006)
Belemboulghin	131
Natenga	158
Rouglisin	153
Silmissin	149
Yagnekonghin	137
