= Ounougou =

Commune in Burkina Faso

Coordinates: 12°32′N 2°12′E

- Location within Burkina Faso, French West Africa
- Country: Burkina Faso
- Province: Kouritenga
- Department: Baskouré

Population (2006)
  - Total: 969
- Time zone: UTC+0 (GMT)

Ounougou, also spelt Oumougou, is a commune in the Baskouré Department of Kouritenga Province in the Centre-Est region of Burkina Faso. It had a population of 969 in 2006.

== Demographics ==
Year	Population
1996	966
2006	969

=== Neighbourhoods ===
Neighbourhood	Population (2006)
Bindatenga	133
Gablighin	145
Guilin	126
Kolyondo	136
Kosogtoedghin	147
Songretenga	137
Witkoare	142
