= Lilgomde =

Lilgomde is the name of several settlements in Burkina Faso. It may refer to:

- Lilgomde, Baskouré
- A neighborhood in Dimistenga, Gounghin Department, Kouritenga Province
