= Ténoaghin =

- Location within Burkina Faso, French West Africa
- Coordinates: 11°58.6′N 0°25′W
- Country: Burkina Faso
- Province: Kouritenga
- Department: Dialgaye
- Elevation: 290 m (950 ft)

Population (2006)
  - Total: 1,297
- Time zone: UTC+0 (GMT)

Ténoaghin, also spelt Tenoaghin or Tenoinghin, is a commune in the Dialgaye Department of Kouritenga Province in the Centre-Est region of Burkina Faso. It had a population of 1,297 in 2006.

== Demographics ==
Year	Population
1985	666
1996	1,203
2006	1,297

=== Neighbourhoods ===
Neighbourhood	Population (2006)
Latenga	224
Napamboum	409
Tinoanghin	511
Zaoguesghin	153
