= Nabdogo, Dialgaye =

Commune in Burkina Faso

Nabdogo
- Country: Burkina Faso
- Province: Kouritenga
- Department: Dialgaye

Population (2006)
  - Total: 2,617
- Time zone: UTC+0 (GMT)

Nabdogo is a commune in the Dialgaye Department of Kouritenga Province in the Centre-Est region of Burkina Faso. It had a population of 248 in 2006.

== Demographics ==
Year	Population
1985	206
1996	287
2006	248

=== Neighbourhoods ===
Neighbourhood	Population (2006)
Nakombogo	85
Natenga	66
Relkoughin	98
