= Kombeolé =

Commune in Burkina Faso

- Location within Burkina Faso
- Coordinates: 12°20.534′N 0°16.276′W
- Country: Burkina Faso
- Province: Kouritenga
- Department: Andemtenga
- Elevation: 307 m (1,007 ft)

Population (2006)
  - Total: 1,264
- Time zone: UTC+0 (GMT)

Kombeolé, also spelled Kombéolé or Kombeole, and also called Siguiri, is a commune in the Andemtenga Department of Kouritenga Province in the Centre-Est region of Burkina Faso. It had a population of 1,264 in 2006.

== Demographics ==
Year	Population
1985	784
1996	1,241
2006	1,264

=== Neighbourhoods ===
Neighbourhood	Population (2006)
Boundougou	145
Goanghin	183
Imdtenga	102
Kalwarin	257
Natenga	271
Passinhoghin	307
