= Yélembasse =

- Location within Burkina Faso, French West Africa
- Coordinates: 11°52.5′N 0°20.2′W
- Country: Burkina Faso
- Province: Kouritenga
- Department: Dialgaye
- Elevation: 308 m (1,010 ft)

Population (2006)
  - Total: 669
- Time zone: UTC+0 (GMT)

Yélembasse, also spelt Yelembasse, is a commune in the Dialgaye Department of Kouritenga Province in the Centre-Est region of Burkina Faso. It had a population of 669 in 2006.

== Demographics ==
Year	Population
1985	425
1996	538
2006	669

=== Neighbourhoods ===
Neighbourhood	Population (2006)
Lenlin	178
Natenga	287
Tewogdo	204
