= Seguem =

- Location within Burkina Faso, French West Africa
- Coordinates: 12°10′N 0°10′W
- Country: Burkina Faso
- Province: Kouritenga
- Department: Baskouré
- Elevation: 326 m (1,070 ft)

Population (2006)
  - Total: 340
- Time zone: UTC+0 (GMT)

Seguem is a commune in the Baskouré Department of Kouritenga Province in the Centre-Est region of Burkina Faso. It had a population of 340 in 2006.

== Demographics ==
Year	Population
1985	317
1996	322
2006	340

=== Neighbourhoods ===
Neighbourhood	Population (2006)
Doure	112
Sanyarce	109
Seguem	119
