= Toesse-Koulba =

- Location within Burkina Faso, French West Africa
- Coordinates: 11°48.9′N 0°17.1′W
- Country: Burkina Faso
- Province: Kouritenga
- Department: Dialgaye
- Elevation: 309 m (1,014 ft)

Population (2006)
  - Total: 815
- Time zone: UTC+0 (GMT)

Toesse-Koulba, also spelt Toessin-Koulouba, is a commune in the Dialgaye Department of Kouritenga Province in the Centre-Est region of Burkina Faso. It had a population of 815 in 2006.

== Demographics ==
Year	Population
1985	554
1996	851
2006	815

=== Neighbourhoods ===
Neighbourhood	Population (2006)
Bagawenéghin	58
Goghin	156
Laknoghin	72
Natenga	90
Saabin	63
Silmissin	135
Tanpingou	163
Zapnamin	77
