= Kando Department =

Coordinates: 12°20′35″N 0°29′43″W

Kando
- Department
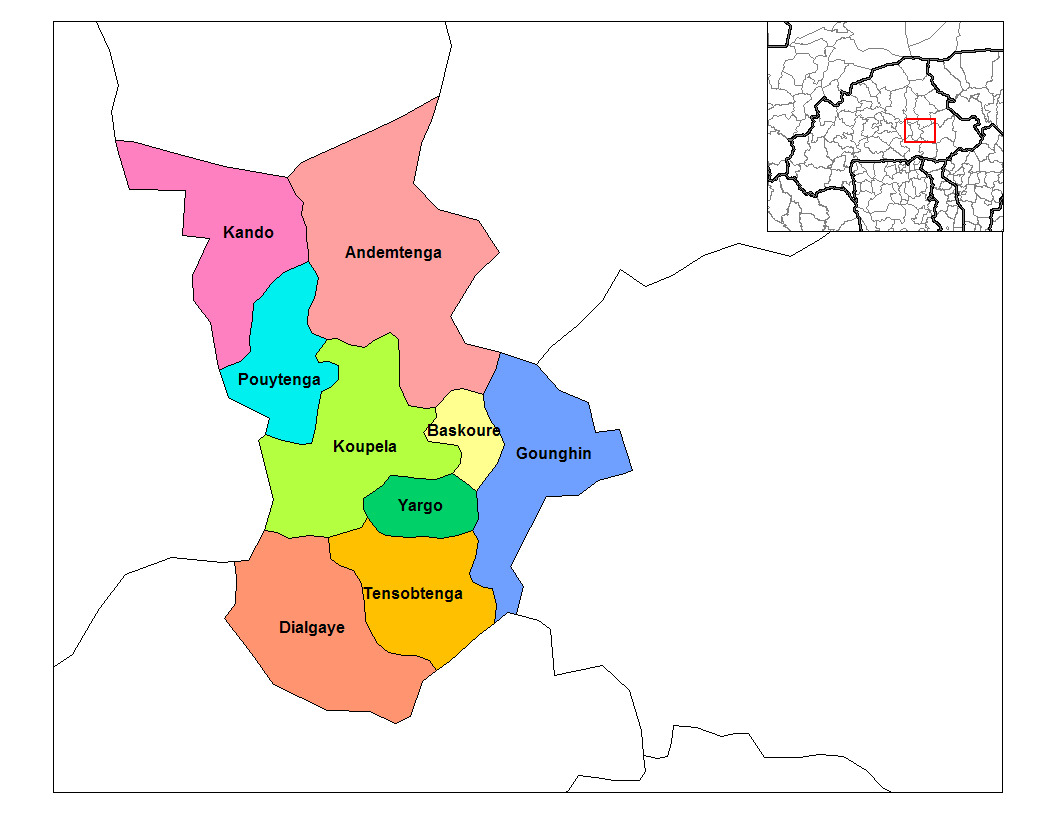
- Kando Department location in the province
- Country: Burkina Faso
- Province: Kouritenga Province

Population (1996)
  - Total: 28,481
- Time zone: UTC+0 (GMT 0)

Kando is a department or commune of Kouritenga Province in eastern Burkina Faso. Its capital lies at the town of Kando. According to the 1996 census the department has a total population of 28,481.

== Towns and villages ==
- Kando (2,329 inhabitants) (capital)
- Bagwokin (586 inhabitants)
- Bissiga (325 inhabitants)
- Bougrétenga (2 014 inhabitants)
- Guirgo (1 869 inhabitants)
- Hamidin (586 inhabitants)
- Ibga (1 368 inhabitants)
- Kampelsezougou (1 702 inhabitants)
- Kiongo (245 inhabitants)
- Kodé-Mendé (3 127 inhabitants)
- Lelkom (1 110 inhabitants)
- Mobèga (1 054 inhabitants)
- Nabnongomzougo (903 inhabitants)
- Neem (590 inhabitants)
- Nigui (1 380 inhabitants)
- Pissi (2 420 inhabitants)
- Poessin (472 inhabitants)
- Salagin (634 inhabitants)
- Soalga (4 551 inhabitants)
- Tankoemsé (596 inhabitants)
- Tansèga (410 inhabitants)
- Yargo (210 inhabitants)
