= Neneogo =

Commune in Burkina Faso

- Location within Burkina Faso, French West Africa
- Coordinates: 11°52′N 0°16.1′W
- Country: Burkina Faso
- Province: Kouritenga
- Department: Dialgaye
- Elevation: 304 m (997 ft)

Population (2006)
  - Total: 2,194
- Time zone: UTC+0 (GMT)

Neneogo is a commune in the Dialgaye Department of Kouritenga Province in the Centre-Est region of Burkina Faso. It had a population of 2,194 in 2006.

== Demographics ==
Year	Population
1985	1,468
1996	2,918
2006	2,194

=== Neighbourhoods ===
Neighbourhood	Population (2006)
Bitallin	217
Bougré	311
Guénoré	80
Kazedsaga	249
Koualanga	156
Nakomnabin	186
Natenga	156
Rouné	342
Tamissi	93
Zédguéyaba	404
