= Dapelgo =

Dapelgo, or similar variants, is the name of several settlements in Burkina Faso. It may refer to:

- Dapelogo, Dapélogo, the capital of Dapélogo Department
- Dapelgo, Gounghin, a village in Gounghin Department
- Dapélgo, Binde, a village in Bindé Department
