= Gomtenga =

Commune in Burkina Faso

- Location within Burkina Faso
- Coordinates: 11°58′N 0°20.6′W
- Country: Burkina Faso
- Province: Kouritenga
- Department: Dialgaye
- Elevation: 290 m (950 ft)

Population (2006)
  - Total: 2,617
- Time zone: UTC+0 (GMT)

Gomtenga is a commune in the Dialgaye Department of Kouritenga Province in the Centre-Est region of Burkina Faso. It had a population of 2,617 in 2006.

== Demographics ==
Year	Population
1985	1,682
1996	2,453
2006	2,617

=== Neighbourhoods ===
Neighbourhood	Population (2006)
Goghin	177
Karyanghin	388
Kolkomin	333
Koulroure	444
Natenga	665
Pawendin	444
Pogomnoré	166
