= Mendrin-Tountoghin =

Commune in Burkina Faso

- Country: Burkina Faso
- Province: Kouritenga
- Department: Gounghin

Population (2006)
  - Total: 240
- Time zone: UTC+0 (GMT)

Mendrin-Tountoghin is a commune in the Gounghin Department of Kouritenga Province in the Centre-Est region of Burkina Faso. It had a population of 240 in 2006.

== Demographics ==
Year	Population
1996	283
2006	240

=== Neighbourhoods ===
Neighbourhood	Population (2006)
Mendrin	65
Toumtoghin	175
