= Bilanghin =

- Location within Burkina Faso, French West Africa
- Coordinates: 12°08′07.25″N 0°02′54.67″W
- Country: Burkina Faso
- Province: Kouritenga
- Department: Gounghin
- Elevation: 320 m (1,050 ft)

Population (2006)
  - Total: 643
- Time zone: UTC+0 (GMT)

Bilanghin, also spelt Bilanguin, Bilanguen or Bilenghin, is a commune in the Gounghin Department of Kouritenga Province in the Centre-Est region of Burkina Faso. It had a population of 643 in 2006.

== Demographics ==
Year	Population
1985	504
1996	686
2006	643

=== Neighbourhoods ===
Neighbourhood	Population (2006)
Bilandoure	130
Brangredabogo	126
Koosnatenga	141
Mointenga	106
Rapotenga	141
