= Niongretenga =

- Location within Burkina Faso, French West Africa
- Coordinates: 11°59′01.62″N 0°12′15.26″W
- Country: Burkina Faso
- Province: Kouritenga
- Department: Gounghin
- Elevation: 315 m (1,033 ft)

Population (2006)
  - Total: 1,104
- Time zone: UTC+0 (GMT)

Niongretenga is a commune in the Gounghin Department of Kouritenga Province in the Centre-Est region of Burkina Faso. It had a population of 1,104 in 2006.

== Demographics ==
| Year | Population |
|---|---|
| 1985 | 1,004 |
| 1996 | 1,247 |
| 2006 | 1,104 |

=== Neighbourhoods ===
| Neighbourhood | Population (2006) |
|---|---|
| Faire | 295 |
| Nakomnabin | 197 |
| Natenga | 345 |
| Tabranne | 266 |
