= Nalanghin =

- Country: Burkina Faso
- Province: Kouritenga
- Department: Gounghin

Population (2006)
  - Total: 418
- Time zone: UTC+0 (GMT)

Nalanghin is a commune in the Gounghin Department of Kouritenga Province in the Centre-Est region of Burkina Faso. It had a population of 418 in 2006.

== Demographics ==
Year	Population
1996	390
2006	418

=== Neighbourhoods ===
Neighbourhood	Population (2006)
Dapore	135
Natenga	177
Nintaore	106
