= Kontaga, Gounghin =

Commune in Burkina Faso

Kontaga
- Location within Burkina Faso
- Coordinates: 12°09′39.93″N 0°05′48.49″W
- Country: Burkina Faso
- Province: Kouritenga
- Department: Gounghin
- Elevation: 329 m (1,079 ft)

Population (2006)
  - Total: 500
- Time zone: UTC+0 (GMT)

Kontaga is a commune in the Gounghin Department of Kouritenga Province in the Centre-Est region of Burkina Faso. It had a population of 500 in 2006.

== Demographics ==
Year	Population
1985	365
1996	478
2006	500

=== Neighbourhoods ===
Neighbourhood	Population (2006)
Bagtenga	281
Natenga	219
