= Pouytenga Department =

Coordinates: 12.2525°N 0.4269°W

Pouytenga
- Department
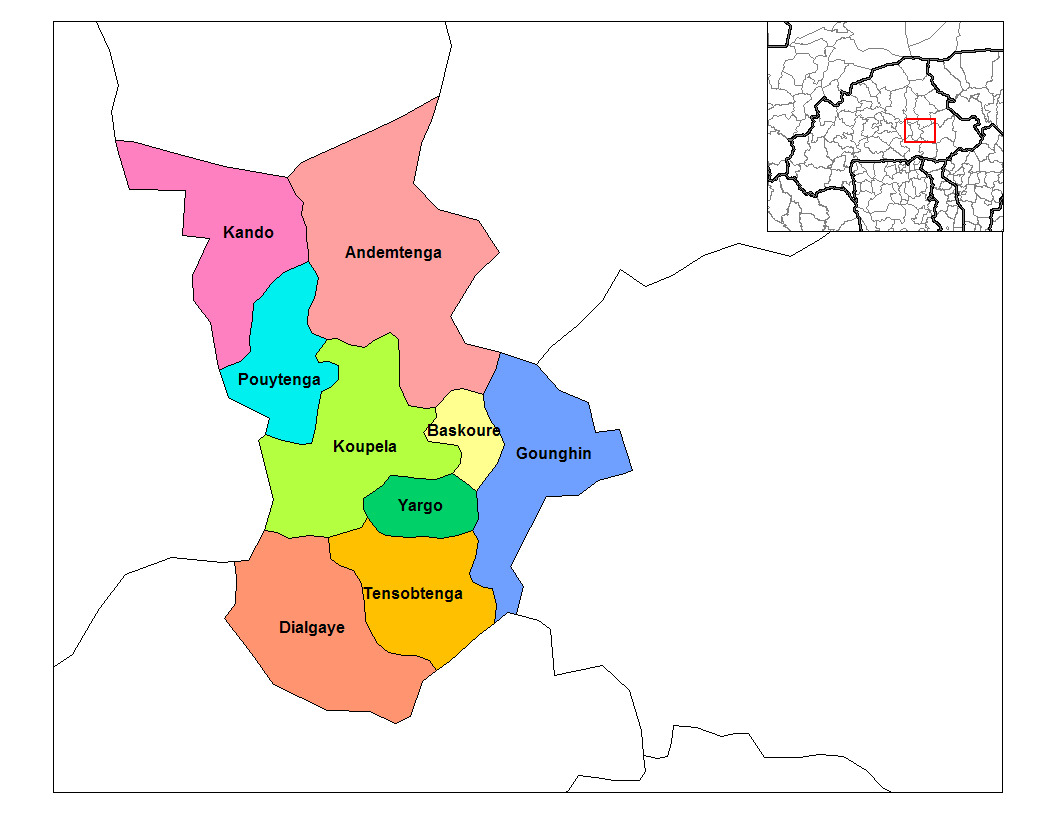
- Pouytenga Department location in the province
- Country: Burkina Faso
- Province: Kouritenga Province

Area
  - Department: 68 sq mi (175 km^{2})

Population (2019 census)
  - Department: 118,511
  - Density: 1,750/sq mi (677/km^{2})
  - Urban: 96,469
- Time zone: UTC+0 (GMT 0)

Pouytenga is a department or commune of Kouritenga Province in eastern Burkina Faso. Its capital is the town of Pouytenga. According to the 2019 census the department had a total population of 118,511.

== Towns and villages ==
- Pouytenga (96 469 inhabitants) (capital)
- Belmin (715 inhabitants)
- Dassambin (462 inhabitants)
- Goghin (687 inhabitants)
- Gorbilin (329 inhabitants)
- Gorkassinghin (251 inhabitants)
- Kalwartenga (1 681 inhabitants)
- Konlastenga (605 inhabitants)
- Kourit-Bil-Yargo (1 280 inhabitants)
- Kourityaoghin (414 inhabitants)
- Léamtenga (683 inhabitants)
- Nimpougo (942 inhabitants)
- Noéssin (1141 inhabitants)
- Pelga (1 791 inhabitants)
- Pouytenga-Peulh (103 inhabitants)
- Signenoghin (806 inhabitants)
- Zaongo (272 inhabitants)
- Zoré (2 732 inhabitants)
