= Pilorghin =

Commune in Burkina Faso

- Location within Burkina Faso, French West Africa
- Coordinates: 12°04′50.31″N 0°07′59.11″W
- Country: Burkina Faso
- Province: Kouritenga
- Department: Gounghin
- Elevation: 314 m (1,030 ft)

Population (2006)
  - Total: 959
- Time zone: UTC+0 (GMT)

Pilorghin, also spelt Pilorguen, is a commune in the Gounghin Department of Kouritenga Province in the Centre-Est region of Burkina Faso. It had a population of 959 in 2006.

== Demographics ==
Year	Population
1985	737
1996	965
2006	959

=== Neighbourhoods ===
Neighbourhood	Population (2006)
Binatenga	195
Natenga	312
Sambin	360
Tambissiri	92
