= Koboundoum =

Commune in Burkina Faso

- Location within Burkina Faso
- Coordinates: 12°26′47″N 0°20′28.8″W
- Country: Burkina Faso
- Province: Kouritenga
- Department: Andemtenga
- Elevation: 293 m (961 ft)

Population (2006)
  - Total: 2,306
- Time zone: UTC+0 (GMT)

Koboundoum or Koboundouen is a commune in the Andemtenga Department of Kouritenga Province in the Centre-Est region of Burkina Faso. It had a population of 2,306 in 2006.

== Demographics ==
Year	Population
1985	1,422
1996	2,230
2006	2,306

=== Neighbourhoods ===
Neighbourhood	Population (2006)
Bonnessin	201
Kobounnarokotin	130
Nabiallin	130
Nabodogo	224
Natenga	387
Tarpousgou	380
Tiongo	122
Wavoussé	224
Zagoné	508
