= Koabdin =

Commune in Burkina Faso

- Location within Burkina Faso
- Coordinates: 12°12′08.52″N 0°07′55.66″W
- Country: Burkina Faso
- Province: Kouritenga
- Department: Gounghin
- Elevation: 316 m (1,037 ft)

Population (2006)
  - Total: 802
- Time zone: UTC+0 (GMT)

Koabdin a commune in the Gounghin Department of Kouritenga Province in the Centre-Est region of Burkina Faso. It had a population of 802 in 2006.

== Demographics ==
Year	Population
1985	496
1996	750
2006	802

=== Neighbourhoods ===
Neighbourhood	Population (2006)
Benzindin	118
Dapotenga	146
Narabodin	104
Natenga	125
Natenkotin	84
Rabosgomdin	122
Silmissin	104
