= Pouytenga =

Capital City of Kouritenga Province, Burkina Faso

- City
- Location within Burkina Faso
- Coordinates: 12°15′N 0°26′W
- Country: Burkina Faso
- Province: Kouritenga
- Department: Pouytenga
- Elevation: 313 m (1,027 ft)

Population (2019 census)
  - Total: 96,469
- Time zone: UTC+0 (GMT)

Pouytenga is the capital and largest city in the Pouytenga Department of Kouritenga Province in Burkina Faso. It has a population of 96,469 (2019 census).

== History ==
Pouytenga was founded by the Mossi chief Naaba Pouya, from whom it received its name. The name means "land of sharing" or "land of hospitality" in the Mòoré language.

== Geography ==
The city is located in the northern part of the province at the intersection of international roads RN16 Koupéla - border of Togo at 149 km from the border and RN4 Ouagadougou - Niger border at 154 km from Ouagadougou.

It is made up of a strong Yarcé community.

=== Neighbourhoods of the city ===
- Yars-sin
- Poes-sin
- Karob-guin
- Kows-ramb-bin
- Djo-N'guin
- Kombouw-bo
- Pissaal-gho
- Gar-kin

== Economy ==
Crafts in the commune of Pouytenga are characterised by the diversity of the activities carried out and the low level of qualification of the majority of the players. Crafts are the second most important urban employment sector (which itself includes so-called artisan activities). This includes the craft of production, the craft of services and the craft of art.

The production craft is the most represented type. It is found in the textile sector, wood and metal joinery, metal processing, construction, maintenance and repair of buildings (masonry, painting, plumbing, etc.), preparation or manufacture of products including fresh bakery, pastry, butchery and fishmongery, as well as the preparation or manufacture of crafted ice-cream, alcoholic beverages (dolo) and catering.

The service craft, which is poorly represented because of its diversity, includes hairdressing, butchery, driving, maintenance and repair of vehicles and machinery, small-scale sales of handicrafts, and photography.

The craftsmanship of art is varied in all the localities of the municipality; it is mainly represented by professionals in leather, woodworking, natural resource processing and recovery, decoration. The contribution of this sector to the local economy is quite significant even though it is not recognised.

=== Agriculture ===
Agriculture is the second most prevalent occupation of the population after trade. It is practised in villages and remains heavily dependent on climatic hazards. It is an agriculture characterised by the use of equipment which is still inefficient even if it is noted that the use of the plough, especially mule-pulled, cattle and tractors, is becoming increasingly in the habits of producers and is threatened by the strong pressure on land.

Agriculture produced in the commune is highly diversified and focuses on three types of crops, namely cereal crops, cash crops and other food crops. Vegetable crops are also grown.

==== Cereal crops ====
The cereal crops produced are red sorghum, white sorghum, millet, maize and rice. These crops are produced mainly for self-consumption, but some are sold on the market, notably the Pouytenga market, or to collectors, semi-wholesalers and wholesalers.

==== Cash crops ====
Cash crops include groundnuts, sesame and soybeans. Peanut is the most commonly grown crop.

==== Market gardening ====
Market gardening is an activity that is practised in the commune of Pouytenga, especially in villages such as Kourit-Yaoghin, Zaongo, Gorkassinghin, Zoré and Leamtenga.

On the whole, the main vegetable crops grown in the commune are experiencing a general upward trend in the areas sown. The same applies to the productions and yields obtained. Despite these improvements, the municipality covers only about 35% of its needs.

=== Breeding ===
Two livestock systems coexist in the commune. These are sedentary extensive systems (little practised) and semi-intensive systems (more dominant). The main species raised are cattle, sheep, goats, poultry, donkeys, equines and pigs.

The extensive system is rarely practised due to lack of space, grazing, water points. Transhumance is virtually non-existent given the predominance of fattening. However, breeders from other countries such as Mali and Niger cross the commune. These crossings are carried out at any time of the year, however, with peak periods and heavy numbers (1,000 to 1,500 head of cattle), particularly in the case of tabaski (Eid al-Adha) for sheep and until April–June for cattle.

Semi-intensive farming corresponds to fattening of ovine, bovine, caprine, porcine. It is the most dominant, due mainly to the lack of space and the predominance of the fattening of livestock farrow.

There is the beginning of an intensive rearing of poultry which has demonstrated effective following the diversification of animal production in the municipality.

=== Trade ===
Trade is practised by the majority of the population of the commune (about 80%) and the town itself is renowned for this commercial city function at the national level. However, it is a sector which remains dominated by the informal sector, although there is a specialisation in the organisation of the various traders by their membership of a central trade union as well as the different trading areas: the central market (including the bicycle market, the poultry market), the cola market, the cereal market, the livestock market and the "Seko" market. Traders, like the configuration of the population are of various origins (national and foreign countries such as Ghana, Togo, Mali, Nigeria, Niger, etc.). The periodicity of the various markets is synchronous.

=== Market ===
The central market is located at sector 5 on a site with an area of about 4.60 ha. There is a fairly diversified trade, which involves the exchange of products of all kinds, where manufactured goods occupy an important place. These products come from different backgrounds (Ouagadougou, Ghana, Togo, Nigeria, Mali, Cote d'Ivoire, Asia, etc.) and are sold either in shops or makeshift stalls.

Decades old and having given the city a national reputation, this market is still undeveloped. There have been several attempts at development and organisation of the market, but all have failed for various reasons: reluctance of traders, especially those who benefit from the lack of organisation, etc., hence the need for construction of a market that meets all safety standards.

Traders in the central market, like those in other major markets, are organised into associations and trade unions, and the informal nature of commercial activities is dominant.
