= Tossin =

- Location within Burkina Faso, French West Africa
- Coordinates: 12°11′N 0°14′W
- Country: Burkina Faso
- Province: Kouritenga
- Department: Baskouré
- Elevation: 317 m (1,040 ft)

Population (2006)
  - Total: 951
- Time zone: UTC+0 (GMT)

Tossin is a commune in the Baskouré Department of Kouritenga Province in the Centre-Est region of Burkina Faso. It had a population of 951 in 2006.

== Demographics ==
Year	Population
1985	677
1996	996
2006	951

=== Neighbourhoods ===
Neighbourhood	Population (2006)
Kougdmioughin	200
Sabsin	200
Toessin	250
Tossin	300
