= Kidibin =

Commune in Burkina Faso

- Location within Burkina Faso
- Coordinates: 11°58.9′N 0°25.5′W
- Country: Burkina Faso
- Province: Kouritenga
- Department: Dialgaye
- Elevation: 289 m (948 ft)

Population (2006)
  - Total: 678
- Time zone: UTC+0 (GMT)

Kidibin, also spelt Kidbin, is a commune in the Dialgaye Department of Kouritenga Province in the Centre-Est region of Burkina Faso. It had a population of 678 in 2006.

== Demographics ==
Year	Population
1985	437
1996	917
2006	678

=== Neighbourhoods ===
Neighbourhood	Population (2006)
Natenga	222
Nitaoré	203
Zinonghin	254
