= Kiegtougdou =

Commune in Burkina Faso

- Country: Burkina Faso
- Province: Kouritenga
- Department: Gounghin

Population (2006)
  - Total: 280
- Time zone: UTC+0 (GMT)

Kiegtougdou is a commune in the Gounghin Department of Kouritenga Province in the Centre-Est region of Burkina Faso. It had a population of 280 in 2006.

== Demographics ==
Year	Population
1996	265
2006	280

=== Neighbourhoods ===
Neighbourhood	Population (2006)
Kieltougou - Centre	153
Natenga	127
