= Gandeongo-Bogodin =

Commune in Burkina Faso

- Location within Burkina Faso
- Coordinates: 12°01′34.92″N 0°08′32.58″W
- Country: Burkina Faso
- Province: Kouritenga
- Department: Gounghin
- Elevation: 325 m (1,066 ft)

Population (2006)
  - Total: 1,219
- Time zone: UTC+0 (GMT)

Gandeongo-Bogodin, also spelt Gandeongo Bogdin or Gandéogo-Bogodin, is a commune in the Gounghin Department of Kouritenga Province in the Centre-Est region of Burkina Faso. It had a population of 1,219 in 2006.

== Demographics ==
Year	Population
1985	879
1996	1,191
2006	1,219

=== Neighbourhoods ===
Neighbourhood	Population (2006)
Banguesome	245
Kankansin	241
Nabraboghin	147
Natenga	258
Siguivousse	192
Tilone	135
