= Nondo, Gounghin =

Nondo
- Country: Burkina Faso
- Province: Kouritenga
- Department: Gounghin

Population (2006)
  - Total: 394
- Time zone: UTC+0 (GMT)

Nondo is a commune in the Gounghin Department of Kouritenga Province in the Centre-Est region of Burkina Faso. It had a population of 394 in 2006.

== Demographics ==
Year	Population
1996	397
2006	394

=== Neighbourhoods ===
Neighbourhood	Population (2006)
Natenga	49
Nondbilin	29
Nondlaalin	97
Yourketin	219
