= Kindi, Andemtenga =

Commune in Burkina Faso

Kindi
- Location within Burkina Faso
- Coordinates: 12°20′03.2″N 0°11′14.2″W
- Country: Burkina Faso
- Province: Kouritenga
- Department: Andemtenga
- Elevation: 293 m (961 ft)

Population (2006)
  - Total: 1,633
- Time zone: UTC+0 (GMT)

Kindi is a commune in the Andemtenga Department of Kouritenga Province in the Centre-Est region of Burkina Faso. It had a population of 1,633 in 2006.

== Demographics ==
| Year | Population |
|---|---|
| 1985 | 1,212 |
| 1996 | 1,437 |
| 2006 | 1,633 |

=== Neighbourhoods ===
| Neighbourhood | Population (2006) |
|---|---|
| Kidagbun | 48 |
| Nabitenghin | 53 |
| Natenga | 131 |
| Nomdoumissi | 84 |
| Sambin | 129 |
| Soubega | 89 |
| Tambela | 43 |
| Tanghin | 85 |
| Toulgou | 853 |
| Wapassin | 45 |
| Yorghin | 73 |
