= Balgo =

Balgo may refer to:

Australia

- Balgo, Western Australia

Burkina Faso

- Balgo, Baskouré, a village in the Baskouré Department of Kouritenga Province
- Balgo, Yargo, a village in the Yargo Department of Kouritenga Province

Sweden

- Balgö, an island and nature reserve in the Kattegat
