= Komsilga, Baskouré =

Commune in Burkina Faso

Komsilga
- Location within Burkina Faso
- Coordinates: 12°12′N 0°12′W
- Country: Burkina Faso
- Province: Kouritenga
- Department: Baskouré
- Elevation: 320 m (1,050 ft)

Population (2006)
  - Total: 784
- Time zone: UTC+0 (GMT)

Komsilga is a commune in the Baskouré Department of Kouritenga Province in the Centre-Est region of Burkina Faso. It had a population of 784 in 2006.

== Demographics ==
Year	Population
1996	740
2006	784

=== Neighbourhoods ===
Neighbourhood	Population (2006)
Bazoughin	250
Kouguenghin	262
Natenga	272
