= Mokomdongo =

Commune in Burkina Faso

- Country: Burkina Faso
- Province: Kouritenga
- Department: Andemtenga

Population (2006)
  - Total: 1,279
- Time zone: UTC+0 (GMT)

Mokomdongo or Monkomdongo is a commune in the Andemtenga Department of Kouritenga Province in the Centre-Est region of Burkina Faso. It had a population of 1,279 in 2006.

== Demographics ==
Year	Population
1985	562
1996	1,171
2006	1,279

=== Neighbourhoods ===
Neighbourhood	Population (2006)
Kiroghin	140
Mounmin	142
Nakomsin	150
Natenga	146
Rasmanwoghin	119
Siguiri	149
Tambiella	144
Yarcin	150
Yongsin	140
