= Issiri Yaoguin =

Commune in Burkina Faso

- Location within Burkina Faso
- Coordinates: 11°52.2′N 0°23.5′W
- Country: Burkina Faso
- Province: Kouritenga
- Department: Dialgaye
- Elevation: 314 m (1,030 ft)

Population (2006)
  - Total: 2,048
- Time zone: UTC+0 (GMT)

Issiri Yaoguin, also spelt Yssiri Yaoghin and Issiriyaoguin, is a commune in the Dialgaye Department of Kouritenga Province in the Centre-Est region of Burkina Faso. It had a population of 2,048 in 2006.

== Demographics ==
Year	Population
1985	1,737
1996	1,932
2006	2,048

=== Neighbourhoods ===
Neighbourhood	Population (2006)
Bongyaoghin	198
Guiatoéga	302
Kelemyorgho	198
Koulgsomé	407
Kousawalghin	216
Moyinmin	173
Natenga	129
Saria	302
Yamdahari	121
