= Wenibankin =

- Location within Burkina Faso, French West Africa
- Coordinates: 12°11′40.83″N 0°07′06.28″W
- Country: Burkina Faso
- Province: Kouritenga
- Department: Gounghin
- Elevation: 312 m (1,024 ft)

Population (2006)
  - Total: 553
- Time zone: UTC+0 (GMT)

Wenibankin, also spelt Wenibaquin or Wenibaguin, is a commune in the Gounghin Department of Kouritenga Province in the Centre-Est region of Burkina Faso. It had a population of 553 in 2006.

== Demographics ==
Year	Population
1985	138
1996	412
2006	553

=== Neighbourhoods ===
Neighbourhood	Population (2006)
Baobe	195
Louligtenga	87
Natenga	145
Yamdawokin	126
