= Tanga, Andemtenga =

Tanga
- Location within Burkina Faso, French West Africa
- Coordinates: 12°24′04.61″N 0°24′34.05″W
- Country: Burkina Faso
- Province: Kouritenga
- Department: Andemtenga
- Elevation: 299 m (981 ft)

Population (2006)
  - Total: 1,781
- Time zone: UTC+0 (GMT)

Tanga is a commune in the Andemtenga Department of Kouritenga Province in the Centre-Est region of Burkina Faso. It had a population of 1,781 in 2006.

== Demographics ==
| Year | Population |
|---|---|
| 1985 | 1,333 |
| 1996 | 1,664 |
| 2006 | 1,781 |

=== Neighbourhoods ===
| Neighbourhood | Population (2006) |
|---|---|
| Natenga | 347 |
| Ronsin | 303 |
| Toeyogdin | 292 |
| Vindega | 521 |
| Vinde-Pallin | 318 |
