= Pissi-Zaoce =

Commune in Burkina Faso

- Location within Burkina Faso, French West Africa
- Coordinates: 12°07′26.46″N 0°03′39.68″W
- Country: Burkina Faso
- Province: Kouritenga
- Department: Gounghin
- Elevation: 318 m (1,043 ft)

Population (2006)
  - Total: 1,791
- Time zone: UTC+0 (GMT)

Pissi-Zaoce, also spelt Pissin and Pissi-Zaocé, is a commune in the Gounghin Department of Kouritenga Province in the Centre-Est region of Burkina Faso. It had a population of 1,791 in 2006.

== Demographics ==
| Year | Population |
|---|---|
| 1985 | 1,024 |
| 1996 | 1,797 |
| 2006 | 1,791 |

=== Neighbourhoods ===
| Neighbourhood | Population (2006) |
|---|---|
| Dianghin | 285 |
| Djibretenga | 380 |
| Natenga | 361 |
| Nouraboghin | 143 |
| Paraghin | 309 |
| Tambissighin | 218 |
| Tampoudin | 95 |
