= Kougoure =

Commune in Burkina Faso

- Location within Burkina Faso
- Coordinates: 12°17.867′N 0°20.409′W
- Country: Burkina Faso
- Province: Kouritenga
- Department: Andemtenga
- Elevation: 319 m (1,047 ft)

Population (2006)
  - Total: 1,767
- Time zone: UTC+0 (GMT)

Kougoure, also spelt Kougouri or Kougré, is a commune in the Andemtenga Department of Kouritenga Province in the Centre-Est region of Burkina Faso. It had a population of 1,767 in 2006.

== Demographics ==
Year	Population
1985	782
1996	1,431
2006	1,767

=== Neighbourhoods ===
Neighbourhood	Population (2006)
Kosnambin	201
Naraghin	310
Natenga	231
Pissi 1	209
Pissi 2	355
Yonsnambin	222
Zoandega	239
