= Dassoui =

Commune in Burkina Faso

- Location within Burkina Faso
- Coordinates: 11°56.5′N 0°28.4′W
- Country: Burkina Faso
- Province: Kouritenga
- Department: Dialgaye
- Elevation: 282 m (925 ft)

Population (2006)
  - Total: 4,231
- Time zone: UTC+0 (GMT)

Dassoui is a commune in the Dialgaye Department of Kouritenga Province in the Centre-Est region of Burkina Faso. It had a population of 4,231 in 2006.

== Demographics ==
Year	Population
1985	2,555
1996	3,589
2006	4,231

=== Neighbourhoods ===
Neighbourhood	Population (2006)
Balmin	413
Kambéogo	361
Kiedpalogo	567
Kobouré	516
Kosnambin	516
Natenga	671
Tengpoughin	775
Yargo	206
Yarsin	206
