= Boto, Burkina Faso =

Boto
- Location within Burkina Faso, West Africa
- Coordinates: 12°19′05″N 0°22′22″W
- Country: Burkina Faso
- Province: Kouritenga
- Department: Andemtenga
- Elevation: 302 m (991 ft)

Population (2006)
  - Total: 1,308
- Time zone: UTC+0 (GMT)

Boto is a commune in the Andemtenga Department of Kouritenga Province in the Centre-Est region of Burkina Faso. It had a population of 1,308 in 2006.

== Demographics ==
Year	Population
1985	833
1996	1,245
2006	1,308

=== Neighbourhoods ===
Neighbourhood	Population (2006)
Balemin	107
Engankoidighin	175
Gango	153
Lilyaala	127
Natenga	246
Ouarango	162
Ouidi	167
Sembrin	171
