= Songrétenga =

- Location within Burkina Faso, French West Africa
- Coordinates: 12°13′21.5″N 0°16′49.6″W
- Country: Burkina Faso
- Province: Kouritenga
- Department: Andemtenga
- Elevation: 305 m (1,001 ft)

Population (2006)
  - Total: 1,832
- Time zone: UTC+0 (GMT)

Songrétenga, also spelt Songretenga or Song Grétenga, is a commune in the Andemtenga Department of Kouritenga Province in the Centre-Est region of Burkina Faso. It had a population of 1,832 in 2006.

== Demographics ==
Year	Population
1985	2,520
1996	1,890
2006	1,832

=== Neighbourhoods ===
Neighbourhood	Population (2006)
Kimbila	192
Natenga	282
Nayoydhin	297
Silwamsé	276
Wapassin	197
Womkanré	182
Zorgho	406
