= Tampella (commune) =

- Location within Burkina Faso, French West Africa
- Coordinates: 12°19′04.69″N 0°20′56.09″W
- Country: Burkina Faso
- Province: Kouritenga
- Department: Andemtenga
- Elevation: 307 m (1,007 ft)

Population (2006)
  - Total: 1,491
- Time zone: UTC+0 (GMT)

Tampella, also spelt Tampela, is a commune in the Andemtenga Department of Kouritenga Province in the Centre-Est region of Burkina Faso. It had a population of 1,491 in 2006.

== Demographics ==
Year	Population
1985	944
1996	1,258
2006	1,491

=== Neighbourhoods ===
Neighbourhood	Population (2006)
Belemkourgin	160
Benaroodin	168
Boinkawiga	166
Bonrouré	124
Gimdin	184
Kougri	140
Lebkougin	151
Midi	132
Tabeillin	113
Tuini	154
