= Nakaba =

Commune in Burkina Faso

- Location within Burkina Faso, French West Africa
- Coordinates: 12°12′N 0°09′W
- Country: Burkina Faso
- Province: Kouritenga
- Department: Baskouré
- Elevation: 309 m (1,014 ft)

Population (2006)
  - Total: 2,934
- Time zone: UTC+0 (GMT)

Nakaba is a commune in the Baskouré Department of Kouritenga Province in the Centre-Est region of Burkina Faso. It had a population of 2,934 in 2006.

== Demographics ==
Year	Population
1996	2,890
2006	2,934

=== Neighbourhoods ===
Neighbourhood	Population (2006)
Bandakui	312
Barguenghin	304
Birghin	298
Kananorin	291
Kinsabla	279
Natenga	305
Sabin	244
Sabtenga	313
Tampousghin	288
Wemtenga	301
