= Sabrabinatenga =

- Location within Burkina Faso, French West Africa
- Coordinates: 12°14′52.9″N 0°13′40.3″W
- Country: Burkina Faso
- Province: Kouritenga
- Department: Andemtenga
- Elevation: 296 m (971 ft)

Population (2006)
  - Total: 2,034
- Time zone: UTC+0 (GMT)

Sabrabinatenga, also spelt Sabrabintenga, is a commune in the Andemtenga Department of Kouritenga Province in the Centre-Est region of Burkina Faso. It had a population of 2,034 in 2006.

== Demographics ==
Year	Population
1985	1,492
1996	1,717
2006	2,034

=== Neighbourhoods ===
Neighbourhood	Population (2006)
Binatenga	158
Gomgho	143
Kananonrin	155
Lasbindin	147
Natenga	226
Pinni	139
Sabroundé	158
Sambin	231
Sirré	128
Tampialin	143
Tampousgou	120
Wayinsgha	159
Zaossin	128
