= Tambogo =

- Location within Burkina Faso, French West Africa
- Coordinates: 12°18′55.13″N 0°23′52.17″W
- Country: Burkina Faso
- Province: Kouritenga
- Department: Andemtenga

Population (2006)
  - Total: 2,403
- Time zone: UTC+0 (GMT)

Tambogo, also known as Tambogo I and II, is a commune in the Andemtenga Department of Kouritenga Province in the Centre-Est region of Burkina Faso. It had a population of 2,403 in 2006.

The town contains a school, Tambogo Primary School, which opened on 1 October 1986. It also contains a private pharmacy, WEDA Wendyam Cathérine, which opened in 2011.

== Demographics ==
Year	Population
1985	1,451
1996	1,934
2006	2,403

=== Neighbourhoods ===
Neighbourhood	Population (2006)
Bakalomé	112
Moinmain	224
Natenga	114
Rockou	415
Sambin	204
Soudgen	235
Tandatenga	108
Tanin	247
Tiguidellin	125
Tilidingen	201
Wennatenga	147
Wobghin	272
