= Songpelcé =

- Location within Burkina Faso, French West Africa
- Coordinates: 11°56.2′N 0°25.5′W
- Country: Burkina Faso
- Province: Kouritenga
- Department: Dialgaye
- Elevation: 293 m (961 ft)

Population (2006)
  - Total: 500
- Time zone: UTC+0 (GMT)

Songpelcé, also spelt Songpelssin, is a commune in the Dialgaye Department of Kouritenga Province in the Centre-Est region of Burkina Faso. It had a population of 500 in 2006.

== Demographics ==
Year	Population
1996	194
2006	500

=== Neighbourhoods ===
Neighbourhood	Population (2006)
Sokpelcé	500
