= Dagamtenga =

Commune in Burkina Faso

- Location within Burkina Faso
- Coordinates: 11°55′19.50″N 0°25′44.46″W
- Country: Burkina Faso
- Province: Kouritenga
- Department: Dialgaye
- Elevation: 296 m (971 ft)

Population (2006)
  - Total: 2,393
- Time zone: UTC+0 (GMT)

Dagamtenga, also spelt Dagemtenga, is a commune in the Dialgaye Department of Kouritenga Province in the Centre-Est region of Burkina Faso. It had a population of 2,393 in 2006.

In the 2006 census, one of Dagamtenga's neighbourhoods, Guetenga, also spelt Guitanga, was listed as a separate settlement with a population of 300, with Dagamtenga's population as 2,093. This would give the combined Dagamtenga-Guitanga settlement a total population of 2,393 in 2006. This population division differs from the divisions in the neighbourhood data, however the total population of all of the neighbourhoods also comes to 2,393.

== Demographics ==
Year	Population
1985	2,653
1996	2,443
2006	2,393

=== Neighbourhoods ===
Neighbourhood	Population (2006)
Ganzourgou	216
Goulgoutin	254
Guetenga	94
Kolgkomin	66
Lademlakrin	57
Natenga	609
Ndeyinghin	66
Samandin	160
Wavoussé	626
Widnabin	188
Zalssin	57
