= Andemtenga-Peulh =

- Location within Burkina Faso, West Africa
- Coordinates: 12°19′34.2″N 0°20′49″W
- Country: Burkina Faso
- Province: Kouritenga
- Department: Andemtenga
- Elevation: 303 m (994 ft)

Population (2006)
  - Total: 810
- Time zone: UTC+0 (GMT)

Andemtenga-Peulh is a commune in the Andemtenga Department of Kouritenga Province in the Centre-Est region of Burkina Faso. It had a population of 810 in 2006.

== Demographics ==
Year	Population
1985	806
1996	149
2006	810

=== Neighbourhoods ===
Neighbourhood	Population (2006)
Agoulaté	212
Agouwaré	92
Letgo	163
Mirghin	342
