= Lioulgou-Peulh =

Commune in Burkina Faso

- Location within Burkina Faso, French West Africa
- Coordinates: 12°00.9′N 0°22.5′W
- Country: Burkina Faso
- Province: Kouritenga
- Department: Dialgaye
- Elevation: 286 m (938 ft)

Population (2006)
  - Total: 838
- Time zone: UTC+0 (GMT)

Lioulgou-Peulh is a commune in the Dialgaye Department of Kouritenga Province in the Centre-Est region of Burkina Faso. It had a population of 838 in 2006.

== Demographics ==
Year	Population
1985	301
1996	988
2006	838

=== Neighbourhoods ===
Neighbourhood	Population (2006)
Baongnoré	191
Gurouwaka	114
Noghin peulh	191
Silminabin	342
