= Kabèga-Peulh =

Commune in Burkina Faso

- Location within Burkina Faso
- Coordinates: 12°06′35.81″N 0°06′50.50″W
- Country: Burkina Faso
- Province: Kouritenga
- Department: Gounghin
- Elevation: 314 m (1,030 ft)

Population (2006)
  - Total: 115
- Time zone: UTC+0 (GMT)

Kabèga-Peulh is a commune in the Gounghin Department of Kouritenga Province in the Centre-Est region of Burkina Faso. It had a population of 115 in 2006.

== Demographics ==
| Year | Population |
|---|---|
| 1985 | 21 |
| 1996 | 80 |
| 2006 | 115 |

=== Neighbourhoods ===
| Neighbourhood | Population (2006) |
|---|---|
| Kapega - Peulh | 115 |
