= Firougou =

- Location within Burkina Faso, West Africa
- Coordinates: 12°18′N 0°25′W
- Country: Burkina Faso
- Province: Kouritenga
- Department: Andemtenga
- Elevation: 310 m (1,020 ft)

Population (2006)
  - Total: 1,429
- Time zone: UTC+0 (GMT)

Firougou or Finougou is a commune in the Andemtenga Department of Kouritenga Province in the Centre-Est region of Burkina Faso. It had a population of 1,429 in 2006.

== Demographics ==
Year	Population
1985	1,021
1996	1,673
2006	1,429

=== Neighbourhoods ===
Neighbourhood	Population (2006)
Baka	542
Natinga	275
Rokotin	231
Tambillin	381
