= Wobzoughin =

- Location within Burkina Faso, French West Africa
- Coordinates: 12°05′26.33″N 0°03′52.68″W
- Country: Burkina Faso
- Province: Kouritenga
- Department: Gounghin
- Elevation: 304 m (997 ft)

Population (2006)
  - Total: 115
- Time zone: UTC+0 (GMT)

Wobzoughin, also spelt Wobzoughinn or Wobzonguen, is a commune in the Gounghin Department of Kouritenga Province in the Centre-Est region of Burkina Faso. It had a population of 399 in 2006.

== Demographics ==
Year	Population
1996	384
2006	399

=== Neighbourhoods ===
Neighbourhood	Population (2006)
Moembin	93
Natenga	175
Rapotenga	131
