= Sampaongo =

- Location within Burkina Faso, French West Africa
- Coordinates: 12°14′30.71″N 0°07′09.69″W
- Country: Burkina Faso
- Province: Kouritenga
- Department: Gounghin
- Elevation: 298 m (978 ft)

Population (2006)
  - Total: 1,637
- Time zone: UTC+0 (GMT)

Sampaongo, also spelt Sampongo, is a commune in the Gounghin Department of Kouritenga Province in the Centre-Est region of Burkina Faso. It had a population of 1,637 in 2006.

== Demographics ==
Year	Population
1985	1,407
1996	1,699
2006	1,637

=== Neighbourhoods ===
Neighbourhood	Population (2006)
Djiougrin	257
Kamlebtenga	80
Katanga	200
Kiedpaloghin	80
Lalganne	200
Nabkiesim	257
Natenga	241
Sambrokin	80
Zoumghin	241
