= Oueffin =

Commune in Burkina Faso

- Location within Burkina Faso, French West Africa
- Coordinates: 12°05′59.97″N 0°08′04.35″W
- Country: Burkina Faso
- Province: Kouritenga
- Department: Gounghin
- Elevation: 311 m (1,020 ft)

Population (2006)
  - Total: 818
- Time zone: UTC+0 (GMT)

Oueffin, also spelt Ouefin, is a commune in the Gounghin Department of Kouritenga Province in the Centre-Est region of Burkina Faso. It had a population of 818 in 2006.

The village has a primary school, l'École Oueffin, which was established in 2010.

== Demographics ==
Year	Population
1985	592
1996	846
2006	818

=== Neighbourhoods ===
Neighbourhood	Population (2006)
Ganyestenga	197
Goungourghin	177
Kouni	197
Natenga	247
