= Ouarghin =

Commune in Burkina Faso

- Location within Burkina Faso, French West Africa
- Coordinates: 11°52′N 0°16.1′W
- Country: Burkina Faso
- Province: Kouritenga
- Department: Dialgaye
- Elevation: 304 m (997 ft)

Population (2006)
  - Total: 1,107
- Time zone: UTC+0 (GMT)

Ouarghin, also spelt Wayalghin, is a commune in the Dialgaye Department of Kouritenga Province in the Centre-Est region of Burkina Faso. It had a population of 1,107 in 2006.

== Demographics ==
Year	Population
1985	1,682
1996	1,048
2006	1,107

=== Neighbourhoods ===
Neighbourhood	Population (2006)
Goghin	191
Kontanbossin	114
Loubgtenga	78
Natenga	132
Pédaogo	131
Sambin	214
Sighoghin	54
Sigvoussé	92
Zougo	100
