= Teyogodin =

Commune in Burkina Faso

- Location within Burkina Faso
- Coordinates: 11°58′26.92″N 0°08′37.43″W
- Country: Burkina Faso
- Province: Kouritenga
- Department: Gounghin
- Elevation: 337 m (1,106 ft)

Population (2006)
  - Total: 1,662
- Time zone: UTC+0 (GMT)

Teyogodin, also spelt Teyogdin and Teyogden, is a commune in the Gounghin Department of Kouritenga Province in the Centre-Est region of Burkina Faso. It had a population of 1,662 in 2006.

== Demographics ==
Year	Population
1985	1,424
1996	1,682
2006	1,662

=== Neighbourhoods ===
Neighbourhood	Population (2006)
Baguempanre	634
Doure	218
Natenga	492
Toessin	317
