= Zeguedega Poessé =

- Location within Burkina Faso, French West Africa
- Coordinates: 11°55.25′N 0°23′W
- Country: Burkina Faso
- Province: Kouritenga
- Department: Dialgaye
- Elevation: 289 m (948 ft)

Population (2006)
  - Total: 1,537
- Time zone: UTC+0 (GMT)

Zeguedega Poessé, also spelt Zeguedega Poesse and also worded Poessin de Zéguedégé, is a commune in the Dialgaye Department of Kouritenga Province in the Centre-Est region of Burkina Faso. It had a population of 1,537 in 2006.

== Demographics ==
Year	Population
1985	1,235
1996	1,583
2006	1,537

=== Neighbourhoods ===
Neighbourhood	Population (2006)
Faïrin	600
Kamnabin	187
Natenga	262
Tangseiga	262
Téwogdo	225
