= Kalwenga =

Commune in Burkina Faso

- Location within Burkina Faso
- Coordinates: 12°01.55′N 0°21.75′W
- Country: Burkina Faso
- Province: Kouritenga
- Department: Dialgaye
- Elevation: 279 m (915 ft)

Population (2006)
  - Total: 609
- Time zone: UTC+0 (GMT)

Kalwenga is a commune in the Dialgaye Department of Kouritenga Province in the Centre-Est region of Burkina Faso. It had a population of 609 in 2006.

== Demographics ==
Year	Population
1985	370
1996	670
2006	609

=== Neighbourhoods ===
Neighbourhood	Population (2006)
Kalwenbili	204
Koukoubi	52
Natenga	167
Rakoutin	74
Silghin	112
