= Nougbini =

Commune in Burkina Faso

- Location within Burkina Faso, French West Africa
- Coordinates: 12°05′48.18″N 0°06′20.14″W
- Country: Burkina Faso
- Province: Kouritenga
- Department: Gounghin
- Elevation: 310 m (1,020 ft)

Population (2006)
  - Total: 247
- Time zone: UTC+0 (GMT)

Nougbini is a commune in the Gounghin Department of Kouritenga Province in the Centre-Est region of Burkina Faso. It had a population of 247 in 2006.

== Demographics ==
Year	Population
1985	204
1996	256
2006	247

=== Neighbourhoods ===
Neighbourhood	Population (2006)
Kanlili	64
Kouli	54
Natenga	75
Nintaore	54
