= Kougdo =

Commune in Burkina Faso

- Location within Burkina Faso
- Coordinates: 12°07′25.69″N 0°02′06.71″W
- Country: Burkina Faso
- Province: Kouritenga
- Department: Gounghin
- Elevation: 312 m (1,024 ft)

Population (2006)
  - Total: 890
- Time zone: UTC+0 (GMT)

Kougdo is a commune in the Gounghin Department of Kouritenga Province in the Centre-Est region of Burkina Faso. It had a population of 890 in 2006.

== Demographics ==
Year	Population
1985	862
1996	878
2006	890

=== Neighbourhoods ===
Neighbourhood	Population (2006)
Karkouissin	212
Kouidennin	297
Natenga	254
Yandebtenga	127
