= Milimtenga =

Place in Kouritenga, Burkina Faso

- Location within Burkina Faso, French West Africa
- Coordinates: 12°05′57.79″N 0°05′33.86″W
- Country: Burkina Faso
- Province: Kouritenga
- Department: Gounghin
- Elevation: 306 m (1,004 ft)

Population (2006)
  - Total: 222
- Time zone: UTC+0 (GMT)

Milimtenga, also spelt Milemtenga, is a commune in the Gounghin Department of Kouritenga Province in the Centre-Est region of Burkina Faso. It had a population of 222 in 2006.

== Demographics ==
Year	Population
1985	682
1996	152
2006	222

=== Neighbourhoods ===
Neighbourhood	Population (2006)
Gandentenga	442
Natenga	295
Sitenga	74
Tensobtenga	0
Waogtenga	110
