= Kampoayargo =

Commune in Burkina Faso

- Location within Burkina Faso
- Coordinates: 11°52.1′N 0°22.9′W
- Country: Burkina Faso
- Province: Kouritenga
- Department: Dialgaye
- Elevation: 314 m (1,030 ft)

Population (2006)
  - Total: 853
- Time zone: UTC+0 (GMT)

Kampoayargo, also spelt Kampoa Yargo, Kompoueyorgho, Kampayargo and Compo-Yorgo, is a commune in the Dialgaye Department of Kouritenga Province in the Centre-Est region of Burkina Faso. It had a population of 853 in 2006.

== Demographics ==
Year	Population
1985	550
1996	741so
2006	853

=== Neighbourhoods ===
Neighbourhood	Population (2006)
Kekessin	287
Natenga	297
Tinlili	269
