= Tamissi, Dialgaye =

Tamissi
- Location within Burkina Faso, French West Africa
- Coordinates: 11°52.7′N 0°18.5′W
- Country: Burkina Faso
- Province: Kouritenga
- Department: Dialgaye
- Elevation: 309 m (1,014 ft)

Population (2006)
  - Total: 525
- Time zone: UTC+0 (GMT)

Tamissi is a commune in the Dialgaye Department of Kouritenga Province in the Centre-Est region of Burkina Faso. It had a population of 525 in 2006.

== Demographics ==
Year	Population
1985	371
1996	484
2006	525

=== Neighbourhoods ===
Neighbourhood	Population (2006)
Bagyarcé	73
Garin	110
Natenga	110
Ronsin	88
Yingtaoré	145
