= Koulkienga =

Commune in Burkina Faso

- Location within Burkina Faso
- Coordinates: 12°21′25.1″N 0°16′27.4″W
- Country: Burkina Faso
- Province: Kouritenga
- Department: Andemtenga
- Elevation: 310 m (1,020 ft)

Population (2006)
  - Total: 1,007
- Time zone: UTC+0 (GMT)

Koulkienga or Koulkianga is a commune in the Andemtenga Department of Kouritenga Province in the Centre-Est region of Burkina Faso. It had a population of 1,007 in 2006.

== Demographics ==
Year	Population
1996	814
2006	1,007

=== Neighbourhoods ===
Neighbourhood	Population (2006)
Nabosnoghin	104
Natenga	142
Paspanghin	223
Tobabillin	210
Yelembassin	328
