= Lezotenga =

Commune in Burkina Faso

- Location within Burkina Faso
- Coordinates: 12°03′52.94″N 0°10′11.55″W
- Country: Burkina Faso
- Province: Kouritenga
- Department: Gounghin
- Elevation: 325 m (1,066 ft)

Population (2006)
  - Total: 1,993
- Time zone: UTC+0 (GMT)

Lezotenga, also spelt Lezogotenga, Leosgotenga or Lézogotenga, is a commune in the Gounghin Department of Kouritenga Province in the Centre-Est region of Burkina Faso. It had a population of 1,993 in 2006.

== Demographics ==
Year	Population
1985	1,294
1996	2,004
2006	1,993

=== Neighbourhoods ===
Neighbourhood	Population (2006)
Ambkanre	322
Bolonghin	483
Goghin	114
Gouanlga	107
Lezogtenga	268
Lorgho	376
Wemsilssin	322
