= Niago =

- Location within Burkina Faso, French West Africa
- Coordinates: 12°08′N 0°14′W
- Country: Burkina Faso
- Province: Kouritenga
- Department: Baskouré
- Elevation: 314 m (1,030 ft)

Population (2006)
  - Total: 365
- Time zone: UTC+0 (GMT)

Niago, also spelt Niaogho and Niaogo, is a commune in the Baskouré Department of Kouritenga Province in the Centre-Est region of Burkina Faso. It had a population of 365 in 2006.

== Demographics ==
Year	Population
1996	577
2006	365

=== Neighbourhoods ===
Neighbourhood	Population (2006)
Bamlemmin	41
Guefourgou	37
Nakomdodin	41
Natenga	44
Natentikoutin	44
Ouye	36
Paspanga	39
Tensabtenga	42
Zoagyore	40
