= Godin (Gounghin) =

Commune in Burkina Faso

- Location within Burkina Faso
- Coordinates: 12°05′17.76″N 0°08′01.48″W
- Country: Burkina Faso
- Province: Kouritenga
- Department: Gounghin
- Elevation: 310 m (1,020 ft)

Population (2006)
  - Total: 291
- Time zone: UTC+0 (GMT)

Godin is a commune in the Gounghin Department of Kouritenga Province in the Centre-Est region of Burkina Faso. It had a population of 291 in 2006.

== Demographics ==
Year	Population
1985	274
1996	389
2006	291

=== Neighbourhoods ===
Neighbourhood	Population (2006)
Boangkouarin	58
Katoulyele	46
Nabrin	42
Natenga	79
Silmissin	66
