= Koénd-Zingdémissi =

Commune in Burkina Faso

- Country: Burkina Faso
- Province: Kouritenga
- Department: Andemtenga

Population (2012)
  - Total: 385
- Time zone: UTC+0 (GMT)

Koénd-Zingdémissi, sometimes spelt Koende, Koendé or Zeguedmissi, is a commune in the Andemtenga Department of Kouritenga Province in the Centre-Est region of Burkina Faso. It had a population of 385 in 2006.

== Demographics ==
Year	Population
1996	683
2006	385

=== Neighbourhoods ===
Neighbourhood	Population (2006)
Bakin	45
Natenga	128
Nikiendin	95
Songho	117
