= Simba, Burkina Faso =

Simba
- Location within Burkina Faso, French West Africa
- Coordinates: 12°25′13.73″N 0°17′38.37″W
- Country: Burkina Faso
- Province: Kouritenga
- Department: Andemtenga
- Elevation: 304 m (997 ft)

Population (2006)
  - Total: 3,914
- Time zone: UTC+0 (GMT)

Simba, also called Reguembounla or Réguembounla, is a commune in the Andemtenga Department of Kouritenga Province in the Centre-Est region of Burkina Faso. It had a population of 3,914 in 2006.

== Demographics ==
Year	Population
1985	2,718
1996	4,057
2006	3,914

=== Neighbourhoods ===
Neighbourhood	Population (2006)
Basnéré	315
Calitega	278
Kibtenga	246
Kolonkomin	114
Malagré	99
Nabitenssin	178
Natinga	368
Pasoanghin	103
Ponssimin	108
Rimdoula	332
Salguin	274
Sigironghin	99
Silmigou	154
Simbssilmissi	96
Tabaghin	276
Tobo	81
Tomonsogo	193
Wapessin	243
Watinghin	178
Widi	177
