= Kostenga, Dialgaye =

Kostenga
- Location within Burkina Faso, French West Africa
- Coordinates: 11°59.9′N 0°23.1′W
- Country: Burkina Faso
- Province: Kouritenga
- Department: Dialgaye
- Elevation: 290 m (950 ft)

Population (2006)
  - Total: 283
- Time zone: UTC+0 (GMT)

Kostenga is a commune in the Dialgaye Department of Kouritenga Province in the Centre-Est region of Burkina Faso. It had a population of 896 in 2006.

== Demographics ==
Year	Population
1985	714
1996	964
2006	896

=== Neighbourhoods ===
Neighbourhood	Population (2006)
Kostenga	489
Wapassy	407
