= Silenga =

- Location within Burkina Faso, French West Africa
- Coordinates: 12°18′32.7″N 0°17′46.8″W
- Country: Burkina Faso
- Province: Kouritenga
- Department: Andemtenga
- Elevation: 323 m (1,060 ft)

Population (2006)
  - Total: 1,365
- Time zone: UTC+0 (GMT)

Silenga or Silengen is a commune in the Andemtenga Department of Kouritenga Province in the Centre-Est region of Burkina Faso. It had a population of 1,365 in 2006.

== Demographics ==
Year	Population
1985	689
1996	1,419
2006	1,365

=== Neighbourhoods ===
Neighbourhood	Population (2006)
Bidoghin	38
Daporin	372
Dopanin	179
Koknongin	58
Kolinkomin	106
Natinga	282
Tengseghin	54
Yarcin	277
