= Kalmodo =

Commune in Burkina Faso

- Location within Burkina Faso
- Coordinates: 11°53.35′N 0°22.4′W
- Country: Burkina Faso
- Province: Kouritenga
- Department: Dialgaye
- Elevation: 306 m (1,004 ft)

Population (2006)
  - Total: 529
- Time zone: UTC+0 (GMT)

Kalmodo, also spelt Kalemodo, is a commune in the Dialgaye Department of Kouritenga Province in the Centre-Est region of Burkina Faso. It had a population of 529 in 2006.

== Demographics ==
Year	Population
1985	343
1996	521
2006	529

=== Neighbourhoods ===
Neighbourhood	Population (2006)
Natenga	157
Tinsouka	198
Zagyorghin	174
