= Koundi, Andemtenga =

Commune in Burkina Faso

Koundi
- Location within Burkina Faso
- Coordinates: 12°22′52″N 0°13′24″W
- Country: Burkina Faso
- Province: Kouritenga
- Department: Andemtenga
- Elevation: 296 m (971 ft)

Population (2006)
  - Total: 1,379
- Time zone: UTC+0 (GMT)

Koundi is a commune in the Andemtenga Department of Kouritenga Province in the Centre-Est region of Burkina Faso. It had a population of 1,379 in 2006.

== Demographics ==
Year	Population
1985	2,016
1996	2,733
2006	1,379

=== Neighbourhoods ===
Neighbourhood	Population (2006)
Bolenghin	229
Gougan	168
Kalomkomé	179
Kinnega	104
Koundi	226
Lelkoum	128
Nabakiénma	67
Nabitenga	62
Signonghin	104
Silmissin	57
