= Zaka, Gounghin =

Zaka
- Location within Burkina Faso, French West Africa
- Coordinates: 12°01′34.38″N 0°08′36.96″W
- Country: Burkina Faso
- Province: Kouritenga
- Department: Gounghin
- Elevation: 325 m (1,066 ft)

Population (2006)
  - Total: 464
- Time zone: UTC+0 (GMT)

Zaka is a commune in the Gounghin Department of Kouritenga Province in the Centre-Est region of Burkina Faso. It had a population of 464 in 2006.

== Demographics ==
Year	Population
1985	292
1996	461
2006	464

=== Neighbourhoods ===
Neighbourhood	Population (2006)
Bagrin	126
Belemwende	57
Komkugrin	53
Natenga	141
Natinkotin	37
Yarsin	50
