= Vongo =

Vongo may refer to:

- Vongo, a village in Kouritenga Province, Burkina Faso
- Vongo, a video on demand service from Starz Entertainment
