= Balgo-Zaoce =

- Location within Burkina Faso, French West Africa
- Coordinates: 12°02′34.98″N 0°16′01.80″W
- Country: Burkina Faso
- Province: Kouritenga
- Department: Gounghin
- Elevation: 312 m (1,024 ft)

Population (2006)
  - Total: 1,164
- Time zone: UTC+0 (GMT)

Balgo-Zaoce, also spelt Balgo Zaocé or Balgo-Zaocé, is a commune in the Gounghin Department of Kouritenga Province in the Centre-Est region of Burkina Faso. It had a population of 1,164 in 2006.

== Demographics ==
Year	Population
1985	1,326
1996	1,099
2006	1,164

=== Neighbourhoods ===
Neighbourhood	Population (2006)
Dapore	204
Doure	388
Natenga	204
Tankoense	154
Tinsoka	214
