= Ouédogo-Bokin =

Commune in Burkina Faso

- Location within Burkina Faso, French West Africa
- Coordinates: 12°00′54.79″N 0°10′45.86″W
- Country: Burkina Faso
- Province: Kouritenga
- Department: Gounghin
- Elevation: 332 m (1,089 ft)

Population (2006)
  - Total: 1,407
- Time zone: UTC+0 (GMT)

Ouédogo-Bokin, also written Ouedogo Bokin, Ouedogo-bokin, Ouedogo-Bokin or Ouedogo boken and also simply called Boken, is a commune in the Gounghin Department of Kouritenga Province in the Centre-Est region of Burkina Faso. It had a population of 1,407 in 2006.

== Demographics ==
| Year | Population |
|---|---|
| 1985 | 1,069 |
| 1996 | 1,463 |
| 2006 | 1,407 |

=== Neighbourhoods ===
| Neighbourhood | Population (2006) |
|---|---|
| Ampanghin | 194 |
| Bonkin | 194 |
| Nabdogtenga | 291 |
| Natenga | 194 |
| Paglasghin | 97 |
| Palemboulghin | 48 |
| Rakonsin | 145 |
| Tabrane | 194 |
| Wagesbin | 48 |
