= Dialgaye Department =

Department in Burkina Faso

Coordinates: 11°57′52″N 0°22′34″W

Dialgaye
- Department
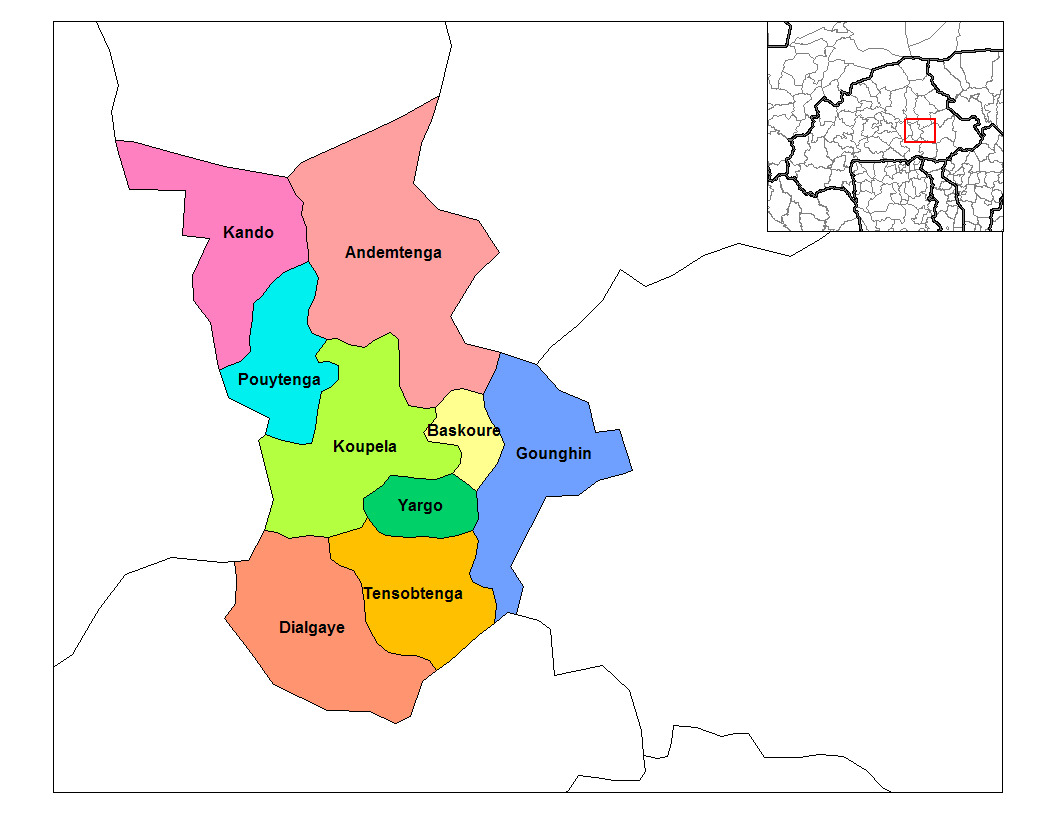
- Dialgaye Department location in the province
- Country: Burkina Faso
- Province: Kouritenga Province

Area
  - Total: 146.1 sq mi (378.5 km^{2})

Population (2019 census)
  - Total: 54,073
  - Density: 370.0/sq mi (142.9/km^{2})
- Time zone: UTC+0 (GMT 0)

Dialgaye is a department of Kouritenga Province in eastern Burkina Faso. Its capital lies at the town of Dialgaye. According to the 2006 census, the department has a total population of 36,893.

== Towns and villages ==
- Dialgaye (3,354 inhabitants) (capital)
- Boulga (2,115 inhabitants)
- Dagamtenga Peulh (180 inhabitants)
- Dagamtenga (2,393 inhabitants)
- Dassoui (4,231 inhabitants)
- Gomtenga (2,617 inhabitants)
- Issiri Yaoguin (2,048 inhabitants)
- Kalmodo (529 inhabitants)
- Kalwenga (609 inhabitants)
- Kampoayargo (853 inhabitants)
- Kidibin (678 inhabitants)
- Kostenga (896 inhabitants)
- Lioulgou (2,482 inhabitants)
- Lioulgou-Peulh (838 inhabitants)
- Loanga (351 inhabitants)
- Nabdogo (248 inhabitants)
- Neneogo (2,194 inhabitants)
- Ouarghin (1,107 inhabitants)
- Passem-Noguin (1,653 inhabitants)
- Songpelcé (500 inhabitants)
- Tamissi (525 inhabitants)
- Ténoaghin (1,297 inhabitants)
- Toesse-Koulba (815 inhabitants)
- Vongo (388 inhabitants)
- Yélembasse (669 inhabitants)
- Zeguedega (1,786 inhabitants)
- Zeguedega Poessé (1,537 inhabitants)

== Demographics ==
| Year | Population |
|---|---|
| 1985 | 25,360 |
| 1996 | 34,331 |
| 2006 | 36,893 |
