= Baskouré Department =

Coordinates: 12°11′N 0°15′W

Baskouré
- Department
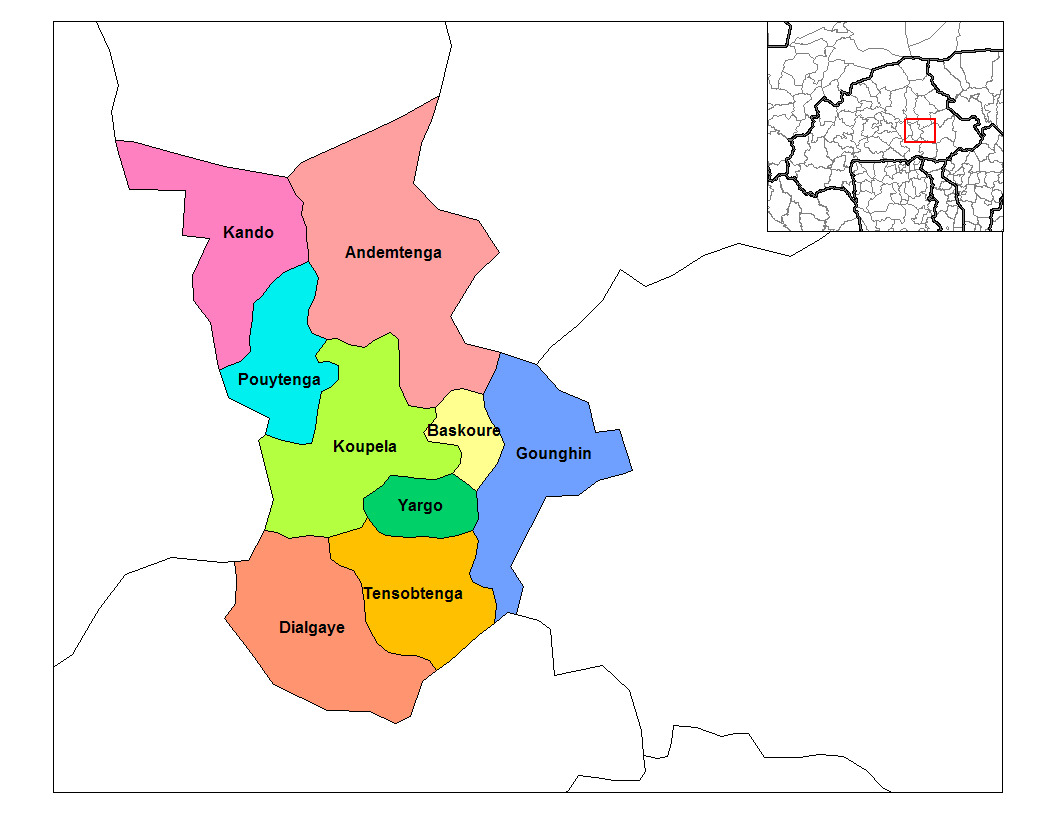
- Baskouré Department location in the province
- Country: Burkina Faso
- Province: Kouritenga Province

Area
  - Total: 27.33 sq mi (70.78 km^{2})

Population (2019)
  - Total: 15,889
  - Density: 581/sq mi (224.5/km^{2})
- Time zone: UTC+0 (GMT 0)

Baskouré is a department of Kouritenga Province in eastern Burkina Faso. Its capital lies at the town of Baskouré. According to the 2019 census the department has a total population of 15,889.

== Towns and villages ==
- Baskouré (2,703 inhabitants) (capital)
- Balgo (165 inhabitants)
- Boumdoudoum (413 inhabitants)
- Komsilga (784 inhabitants)
- Lilgomde (248 inhabitants)
- Nakaba (2,934 inhabitants)
- Niago (365 inhabitants)
- Oualogo (727 inhabitants)
- Ounougou (969 inhabitants)
- Sambraoghin (1,124 inhabitants)
- Seguem (340 inhabitants)
- Tossin (951 inhabitants)

== Demographics ==
Year	Population
1985	4,039
1996	11,447
2006	11,723
2019	15,889
