= Dialgaye =

Commune in Burkina Faso

- Location within Burkina Faso
- Coordinates: 11°57′29.64″N 0°23′20.47″W
- Country: Burkina Faso
- Province: Kouritenga
- Department: Dialgaye
- Elevation: 290 m (950 ft)

Population (2006)
  - Total: 3,354
- Time zone: UTC+0 (GMT)

Dialgaye is the capital town of the Dialgaye Department of Kouritenga Province in the Centre-Est region of Burkina Faso. It had a population of 3,354 in 2006.

== Demographics ==
| Year | Population |
|---|---|
| 1985 | 2,799 |
| 1996 | 3,479 |
| 2006 | 3,354 |

=== Neighbourhoods ===
| Neighbourhood | Population (2006) |
|---|---|
| Banogho | 66 |
| Bindin | 330 |
| Guelbili | 330 |
| Kosnamin | 82 |
| Kossorouré | 66 |
| Lekin | 82 |
| Mostenga | 166 |
| Natenga | 578 |
| Saïgomin | 82 |
| Saguionghin | 248 |
| Sawadghin | 496 |
| Tekondo | 116 |
| Tougsi | 198 |
| Yamyaonghin | 166 |
| Zalsin | 248 |
| Zimbilin | 99 |
