= Yarkanré =

- Location within Burkina Faso, French West Africa
- Coordinates: 12°11′56.94″N 0°07′49.56″W
- Country: Burkina Faso
- Province: Kouritenga
- Department: Gounghin
- Elevation: 316 m (1,037 ft)

Population (2006)
  - Total: 770
- Time zone: UTC+0 (GMT)

Yarkanré, also spelt Yarkanre, Yarkance or Yarkancé, is a commune in the Gounghin Department of Kouritenga Province in the Centre-Est region of Burkina Faso. It had a population of 770 in 2006.

== Demographics ==
Year	Population
1985	913
1996	995
2006	770

=== Neighbourhoods ===
Neighbourhood	Population (2006)
Gandemin	93
Kasnatenga	93
Kologkoomin	140
Lemenimin	70
Nabasnoghin	93
Natenga	93
Yarcin	187
