= Ouenga =

- Location within Burkina Faso, French West Africa
- Coordinates: 12°29′N 0°19.25′W
- Country: Burkina Faso
- Province: Kouritenga
- Department: Andemtenga
- Elevation: 291 m (955 ft)

Population (2006)
  - Total: 5,241
- Time zone: UTC+0 (GMT)

Ouenga, sometimes spelt Oueenga, Winga or Wenga, is a commune in the Andemtenga Department of Kouritenga Province in the Centre-Est region of Burkina Faso. It had a population of 5,241 in 2006.

== Demographics ==
Year	Population
1985	3,528
1996	5,266
2006	5,241

=== Neighbourhoods ===
Neighbourhood	Population (2006)
Balkoné	137
Balnabin	248
Bangrin	247
Doudnaba	317
Konkiema	128
Lelkome	317
Natenga	482
Natenkoudogo	470
Sambsin	317
Samdayalka	245
Samdoré	247
Signoghin	214
Sinsobguin	211
Tambiala	326
Tampougoudou	317
Tansiaghin	211
Tingsoba	434
Yarcin	120
Zonsamwalkin	255
