= Lilgomde, Baskouré =

Commune in Burkina Faso

Lilgomde
- Location within Burkina Faso
- Coordinates: 12°10′N 0°15′W
- Country: Burkina Faso
- Province: Kouritenga
- Department: Baskouré
- Elevation: 310 m (1,020 ft)

Population (2006)
  - Total: 248
- Time zone: UTC+0 (GMT)

Lilgomde is a commune in the Baskouré Department of Kouritenga Province in the Centre-Est region of Burkina Faso. It had a population of 248 in 2006.

== Demographics ==
Year	Population
1996	196
2006	248

=== Neighbourhoods ===
Neighbourhood	Population (2006)
Lilgomde	248
