= Kabèga =

- Location within Burkina Faso, French West Africa
- Coordinates: 12°09′57.32″N 0°08′11.26″W
- Country: Burkina Faso
- Province: Kouritenga
- Department: Gounghin
- Elevation: 331 m (1,086 ft)

Population (2006)
  - Total: 1,032
- Time zone: UTC+0 (GMT)

Kabèga, also spelt Kabega or Kabéra, is a commune in the Gounghin Department of Kouritenga Province in the Centre-Est region of Burkina Faso. It had a population of 1,032 in 2006.

== Demographics ==
Year	Population
1985	1,823
1996	975
2006	1,032

=== Neighbourhoods ===
Neighbourhood	Population (2006)
Asii	191
Dapore	160
Fairin	195
Natenga	177
Nintaore	133
Signoghin	177
