= Gounghin Department =

Department in Burkina Faso

Coordinates: 12°4′N 0°9′W

Gounghin
- Department
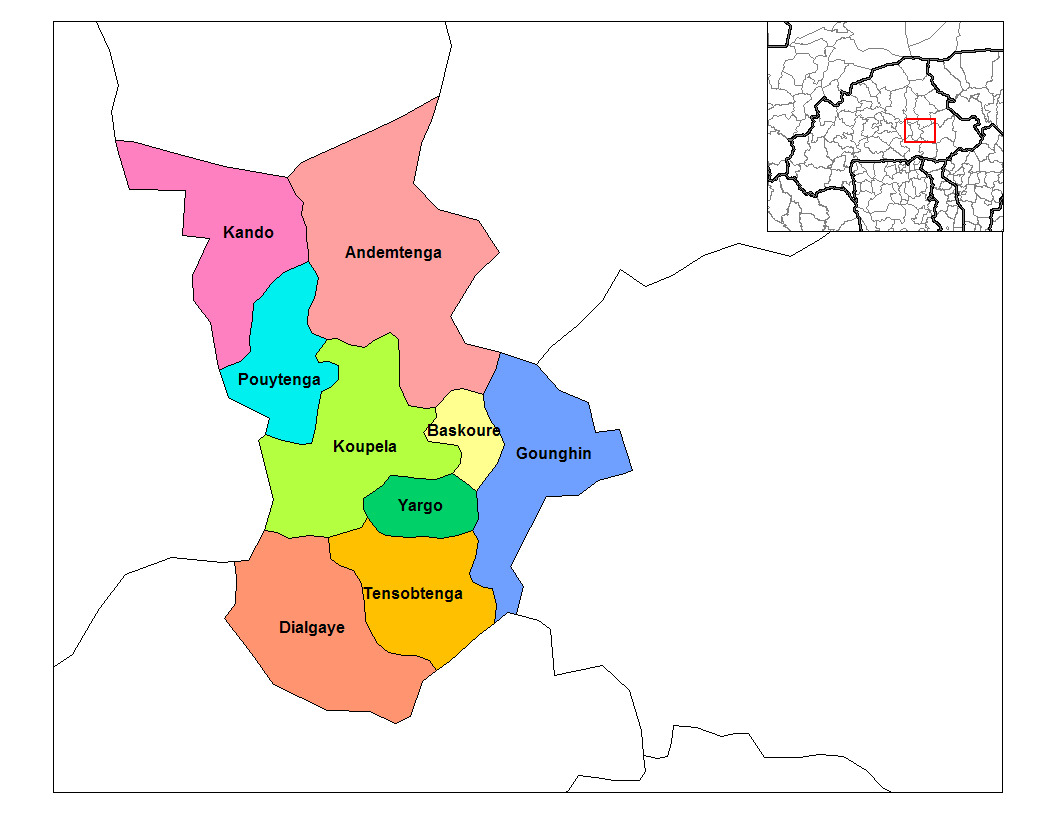
- Gounghin Department location in the province
- Country: Burkina Faso
- Province: Kouritenga Province

Area
  - Total: 161.2 sq mi (417.5 km^{2})

Population (2019 census)
  - Total: 46,379
  - Density: 287.7/sq mi (111.1/km^{2})
- Time zone: UTC+0 (GMT 0)

Gounghin is a department of Kouritenga Province in eastern Burkina Faso. Its capital lies at the town of Gounghin. According to the 2006 census the department has a total population of 35,257.

== Towns and villages ==
- Gounghin (921 inhabitants) (capital)
- Balgo-Zaoce (1,164 inhabitants)
- Belembaoghin (522 inhabitants)
- Belemboulghin (1,350 inhabitants)
- Bilanghin (643 inhabitants)
- Bonsin-Dagoule (2,133 inhabitants)
- Boundoudoum-Zougo (650 inhabitants)
- Dagbilin (586 inhabitants)
- Dakonsin (696 inhabitants)
- Dapelgo (840 inhabitants)
- Dimistenga (1,529 inhabitants)
- Donsin (492 inhabitants)
- Douamtenga (765 inhabitants)
- Gandeongo-Bogodin (1,219 inhabitants)
- Godin (291 inhabitants)
- Kabèga (1,032 inhabitants)
- Kabèga-Peulh (115 inhabitants)
- Kiegtougdou (280 inhabitants)
- Koabdin (802 inhabitants)
- Kontaga (500 inhabitants)
- Kougdo (890 inhabitants)
- Lezotenga (1,993 inhabitants)
- Mendrin-Tountoghin (240 inhabitants)
- Milimtenga (222 inhabitants)
- Mossi-Balgo (250 inhabitants)
- Nalanghin (418 inhabitants)
- Namoukouka (810 inhabitants)
- Niongretenga (1,104 inhabitants)
- Nioughin (987 inhabitants)
- Nondo (394 inhabitants)
- Nougbini (247 inhabitants)
- Ouédogo-Bokin (1,407 inhabitants)
- Oueffin (818 inhabitants)
- Pilorghin (959 inhabitants)
- Pissi-Zaoce (1,791 inhabitants)
- Sampaongo (1,637 inhabitants)
- Sankouissi (245 inhabitants)
- Sitenga (467 inhabitants)
- Teyogodin (1,662 inhabitants)
- Wenibankin (553 inhabitants)
- Wobzoughin (399 inhabitants)
- Yarkanré (770 inhabitants)
- Zaka (464 inhabitants)

== Demographics ==
| Year | Population |
|---|---|
| 1985 | 29,475 |
| 1996 | 34,850 |
| 2006 | 35,257 |
