= Andemtenga Department =

Coordinates: 12.327°N 0.310°W

Andemtenga
- Department
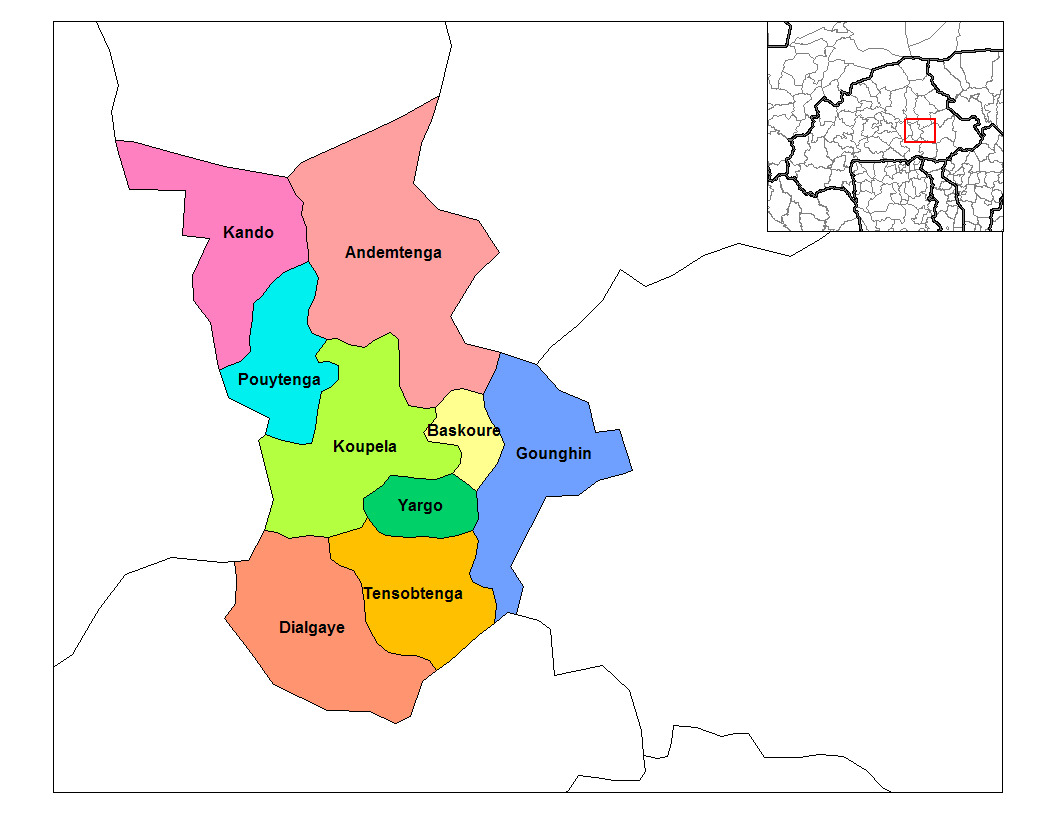
- Andemtenga Department location in the province
- Country: Burkina Faso
- Province: Kouritenga Province

Area
  - Total: 270.3 sq mi (700.0 km^{2})

Population (2019 census)
  - Total: 69,428
  - Density: 256.9/sq mi (99.18/km^{2})
- Time zone: UTC+0 (GMT 0)

Andemtenga is a department of Kouritenga Province in eastern Burkina Faso. Its capital lies at the town of Andemtenga. It had a total population of 49,207 in 2006. Its name is sometimes shortened to Andem in colloquial usage.

In the 2012 parliamentary and municipal election, Innoncent Kontoumgomdé (also spelt Inoussa Oumdamde) of the Congress for Democracy and Progress (CDP) was elected Mayor of Andemtenga Department for a five-year term, beating rival candidate Antoudiouendé Jeans Yves Kaboré of the Union for the Republic (UPR) by claiming 47 of the 55 votes spread amongst the 27 villages of the department. This followed the death of mayor Nonguema Johanie Kaboré in June 2012. The ballot was held on 10 January 2013 in the courtyard of the town hall of Andemtenga, and Kontoumgomdé was invested on 6 February 2013.

From 2015, Ibrahim Koussé was the Prefect of Andemtenga Department.

== Towns and villages ==
- Andemtenga (2,120 inhabitants) (capital)
- Andemtenga-Peulh (810 inhabitants)
- Boto (1,308 inhabitants)
- Doundoudougou (4,535 inhabitants)
- Firougou (1,429 inhabitants)
- Guéfourgou (3,450 inhabitants)
- Kindi (1,633 inhabitants)
- Koboundoum (2,306 inhabitants)
- Koénd-Zingdémissi (385 inhabitants)
- Kombeolé (1,264 inhabitants)
- Kougoure (1,767 inhabitants)
- Koulkienga (1,007 inhabitants)
- Koundi (1,379 inhabitants)
- Mokomdongo (1,279 inhabitants)
- Ouenga (5,241 inhabitants)
- Sabrabinatenga (2,034 inhabitants)
- Sabrouko (288 inhabitants)
- Silenga (1,365 inhabitants)
- Simba (3,914 inhabitants)
- Somdabésma (322 inhabitants)
- Songrétenga (1,832 inhabitants)
- Tambella Mossi (1,929 inhabitants)
- Tambella Peulh (186 inhabitants)
- Tambogo (2,403 inhabitants)
- Tampella (1,491 inhabitants)
- Tanga (1,781 inhabitants)
- Tantako (1,749 inhabitants)

== Demographics ==
Year	Population
1985	33,405
1996	47,622
2006	49,207
