= Vongo, Dialgaye =

Vongo
- Location within Burkina Faso, French West Africa
- Coordinates: 11°53′N 0°20.7′W
- Country: Burkina Faso
- Province: Kouritenga
- Department: Dialgaye
- Elevation: 305 m (1,001 ft)

Population (2006)
  - Total: 388
- Time zone: UTC+0 (GMT)

Vongo is a commune in the Dialgaye Department of Kouritenga Province in the Centre-Est region of Burkina Faso. It had a population of 388 in 2006.

== Demographics ==
Year	Population
1985	242
1996	368
2006	388

=== Neighbourhoods ===
Neighbourhood	Population (2006)
Natisgo	173
Vongo	215
