= Douamtenga =

Commune in Burkina Faso

- Location within Burkina Faso
- Coordinates: 12°06′27.51″N 0°06′48.25″W
- Country: Burkina Faso
- Province: Kouritenga
- Department: Gounghin
- Elevation: 310 m (1,020 ft)

Population (2006)
  - Total: 765
- Time zone: UTC+0 (GMT)

Douamtenga, also spelt Douantenga or Doimtinga, is a commune in the Gounghin Department of Kouritenga Province in the Centre-Est region of Burkina Faso. It had a population of 765 in 2006.

== Demographics ==
Year	Population
1985	644
1996	728
2006	765

=== Neighbourhoods ===
Neighbourhood	Population (2006)
Kolokome	142
Natenga	273
Wedeghin	350
