= Balgo, Baskouré =

Commune in Burkina Faso

Balgo
- Location within Burkina Faso
- Coordinates: 12°02′N 0°16′W
- Country: Burkina Faso
- Province: Kouritenga
- Department: Baskouré
- Elevation: 312 m (1,024 ft)

Population (2006)
  - Total: 165
- Time zone: UTC+0 (GMT)

Balgo, also spelt Bologo, is a commune in the Baskouré Department of Kouritenga Province in the Centre-Est region of Burkina Faso. It had a population of 165 in 2006.

== Demographics ==
Year	Population
1996	203
2006	165

=== Neighbourhoods ===
Neighbourhood	Population (2006)
Natenga	91
Yarce	74
