= Yabré =

Yabré is a Burkinabé surname. Notable people with the surname include:

- Abdul Yabré (born 1995), Italian and Burkinabé footballer
- François Yabré (born 1991), Burkinabé footballer
