= Dapelgo, Gounghin =

Commune in Burkina Faso

Dapelgo
- Location within Burkina Faso
- Coordinates: 12°07′56.78″N 0°07′36.54″W
- Country: Burkina Faso
- Province: Kouritenga
- Department: Gounghin
- Elevation: 326 m (1,070 ft)

Population (2006)
  - Total: 840
- Time zone: UTC+0 (GMT)

Dapelgo, also spelt Dapelogo, Dapélogo, Dapelego or Dapélégo, is a commune in the Gounghin Department of Kouritenga Province in the Centre-Est region of Burkina Faso. It had a population of 840 in 2006.

== Demographics ==
Year	Population
1985	637
1996	924
2006	840

=== Neighbourhoods ===
Neighbourhood	Population (2006)
Boulebtenga	177
Ganboulsin	265
Natenga	221
Yandebtenga	177
