= Andemtenga =

- Location within Burkina Faso, West Africa
- Coordinates: 12°19′23.2″N 0°18′37.3″W
- Country: Burkina Faso
- Province: Kouritenga
- Department: Andemtenga
- Elevation: 320 m (1,050 ft)

Population (2006)
  - Total: 2,120
- Time zone: UTC+0 (GMT)

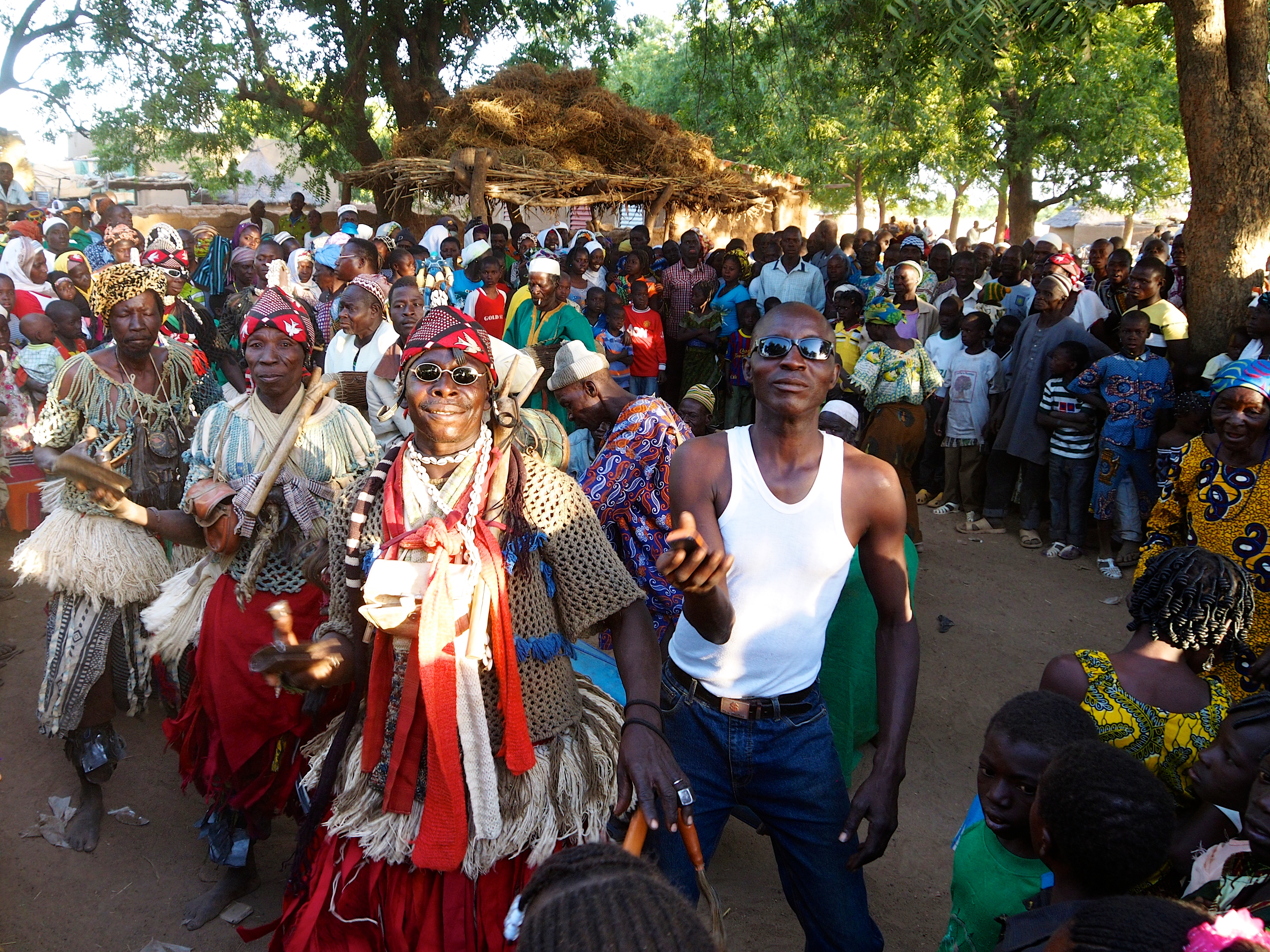
Dances of the Nakoobo ceremony of the Mossi chief Naaba Zomb Wobgo in Andemtenga

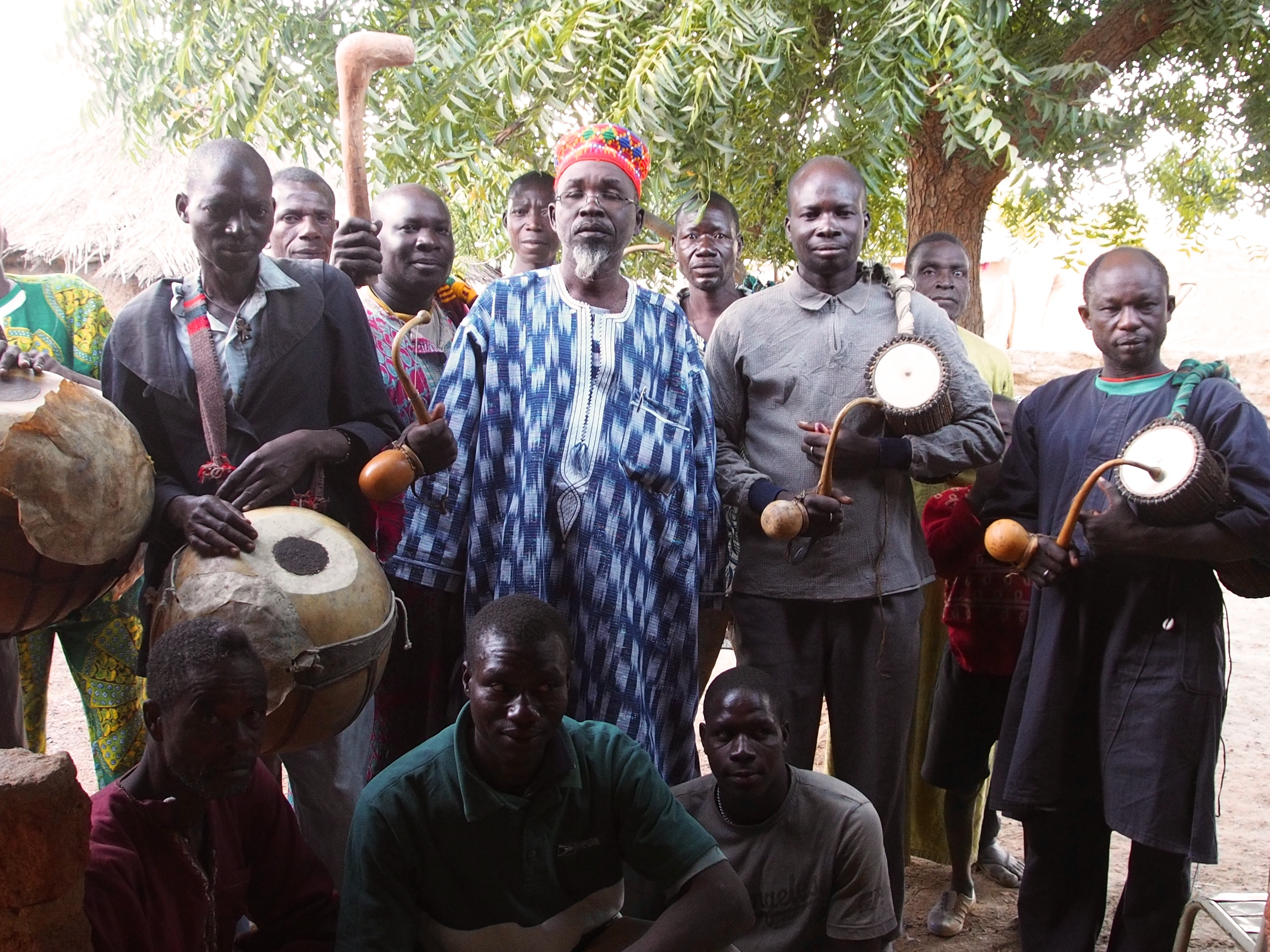
The Mossi chief Naaba Zomb Wobgo during the Nakoobo ceremony at Andemtenga, Kouritenga province, Burkina Faso

Andemtenga (sometimes spelt Amdemtenga, Andamtenga or Amdentenga) is the capital and largest settlement in Andemtenga Department, Kouritenga province, Burkina Faso. It had a population of about 2,120 in 2006.

On 15 January 2017, the Burkinabé musician Floby was made Noom Naaba or "Chief of the Atmosphere" of Andemtenga, his home town, by the customary canton chief.

== Demographics ==
Year	Population
1985	2,372
1996	2,589
2006	2,120

=== Neighbourhoods ===
Neighbourhood	Population (2006)
Kanrin	50
Kindayorguin	118
Moinbin	307
Natenga	312
Poessin	122
Sentenga	346
Somdabesma	241
Wendenyogin	238
Yarcin	116
Yartenga	271
