= Belmin =

Belmin is a Bosnian given name. Notable people with the name include:

- Belmin Beganović (born 2004), Austrian football forward
- Belmin Dizdarević (born 2001), Bosnian football goalkeeper
