= Baskouré =

Commune in Burkina Faso

- Location within Burkina Faso
- Coordinates: 12°11′N 0°14′W
- Country: Burkina Faso
- Province: Kouritenga
- Department: Baskouré
- Elevation: 309 m (1,014 ft)

Population (2006)
  - Total: 2,703
- Time zone: UTC+0 (GMT)

Baskouré, also spelt Baskoure, is the capital town of the Baskouré Department of Kouritenga Province in the Centre-Est region of Burkina Faso. It had a population of 2,703 in 2006.

== Demographics ==
Year	Population
1985	2,243
1996	2,349
2006	2,703

=== Neighbourhoods ===
Neighbourhood	Population (2006)
Baonghin	466
Kaggadghin	528
Natenga	536
Reanghin	59
Sanbin	532
Siborin	513
Tambissighin	70
