= Koupéla Department =

Coordinates: 12°11′N 0°26′W

Koupéla
- Department
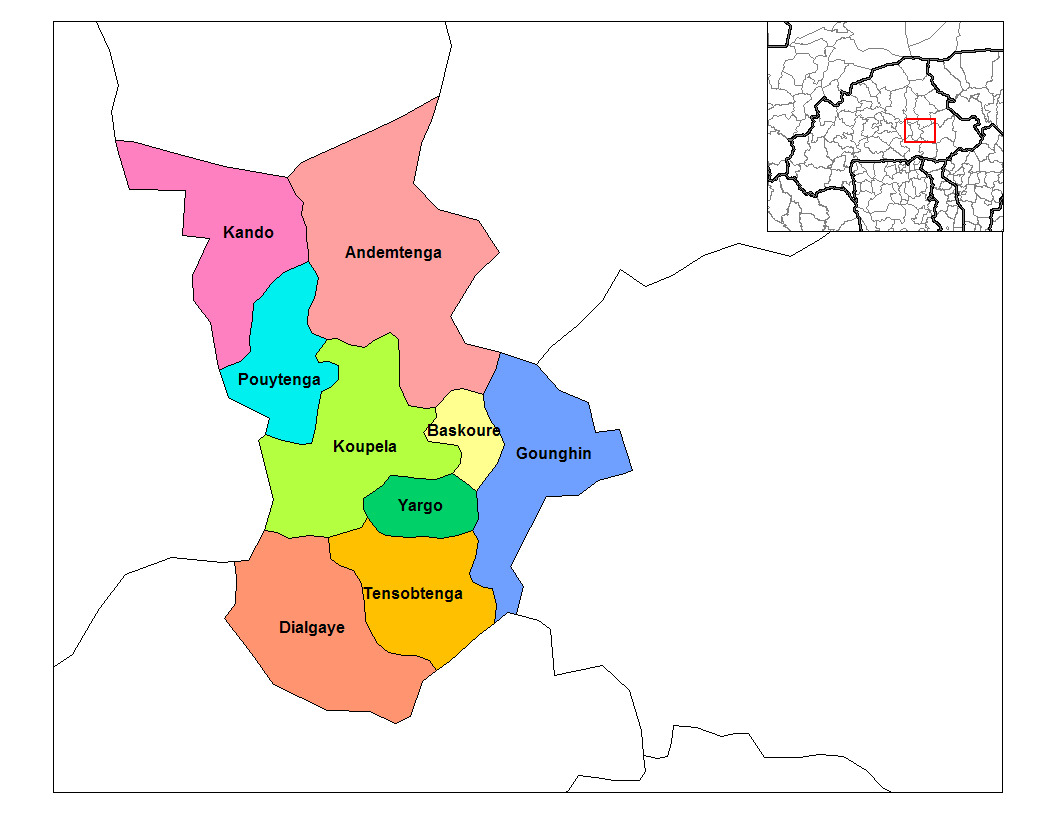
- Koupéla Department location in the province
- Country: Burkina Faso
- Province: Kouritenga Province

Area
  - Department: 131 sq mi (339 km^{2})

Population (2019 census)
  - Department: 91,008
  - Density: 695/sq mi (268/km^{2})
  - Urban: 49,372
- Time zone: UTC+0 (GMT 0)

Koupéla is a department or commune of Kouritenga Province in eastern Burkina Faso. Its capital is the town of Koupéla. According to the 2019 census the department has a total population of 91,008.

== Towns and villages ==
- Koupéla (49 372 inhabitants) (capital)
- Bik-Baskouré (506 inhabitants)
- Boangtenga (1 496 inhabitants)
- Boangtenga-Peulh (78 inhabitants)
- Bonnessin (1 015 inhabitants)
- Dianghin (583 inhabitants)
- Dimpaltenga (322 inhabitants)
- Dimpaltenga-Peulh (271 inhabitants)
- Gampougdo-Peulh (127 inhabitants)
- Gargaoua-Peulh (142 inhabitants)
- Gninga (1 006 inhabitants)
- Gorgo (1 972 inhabitants)
- Kamsaoghin (847 inhabitants)
- Kanrin (376 inhabitants)
- Kokemnoré (352 inhabitants)
- Koudmi (1 148 inhabitants)
- Koughin (612 inhabitants)
- Koughin-Peulh (131 inhabitants)
- Kouritenga (574 inhabitants)
- Lelguem (366 inhabitants)
- Liguidi-Malguem (2 059 inhabitants)
- Nabikessem (282 inhabitants)
- Naftenga (813 inhabitants)
- Nayamtenga (1 229 inhabitants)
- Nohoungo (2 181 inhabitants)
- Ouédogo (174 inhabitants)
- Pissalgo (294 inhabitants)
- Poessin (815 inhabitants)
- Tarbonnessin (338 inhabitants)
- Tibin (560 inhabitants)
- Tiini (245 inhabitants)
- Tini (1 858 inhabitants)
- Togtenga (796 inhabitants)
- Toulougou-Kanrin (701 inhabitants)
- Toulougou-Nakomsé (252 inhabitants)
- Toulougou-Yarcé (597 inhabitants)
- Wédogo-Petit (740 inhabitants)
- Wedogo-Peulh (88 inhabitants)
- Zaogo (1 543 inhabitants)
- Zorkoum (624 inhabitants)
- Zougo (446 inhabitants)
