= Kando, Burkina Faso =

Coordinates: 9°47′20″N 4°22′14″W

Kando
- Interactive map of Kando
- Country: Burkina Faso
- Region: Cascades Region
- Province: Comoé Province
- Department: Mangodara Department

Population (2019)
  - Total: 214

Kando is a village in the Mangodara Department of Comoé Province in south-western Burkina Faso.

Population
Year	Pop.	±%
2006	105	—
2019	214	+103.8%
