= Koupéla =

- City
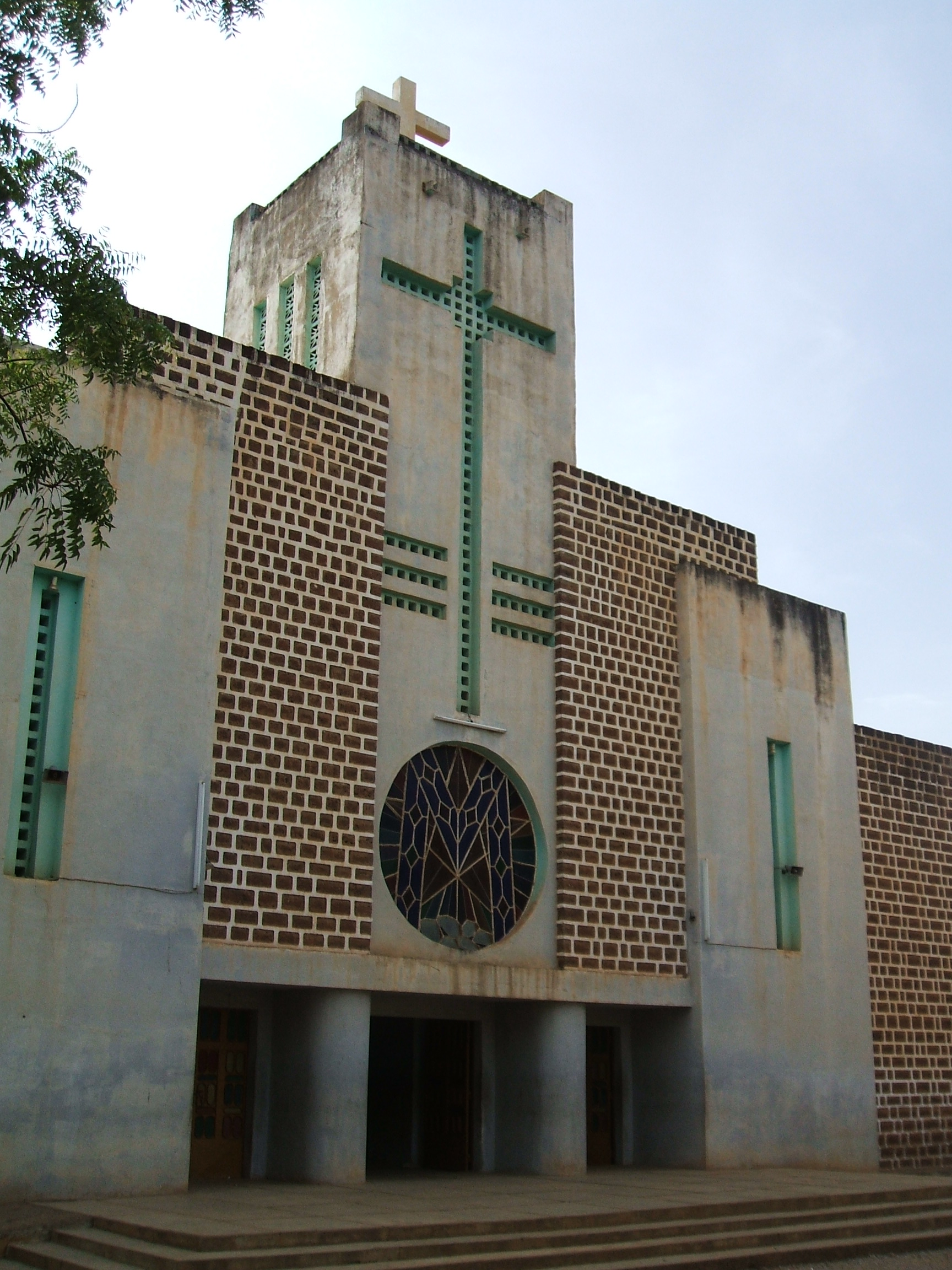
- Our Lady of Graces Cathedral, Koupéla

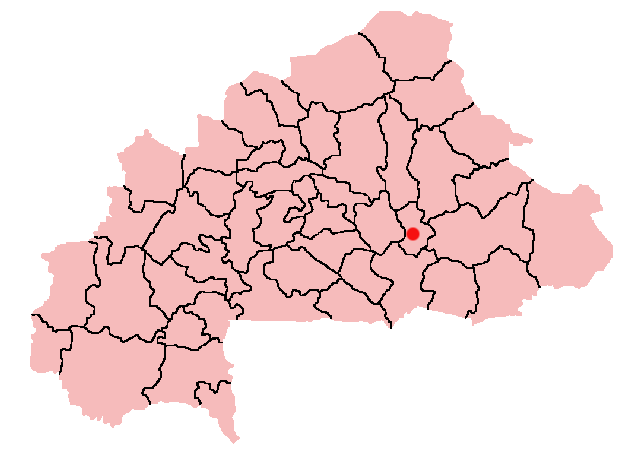
- Location within Burkina Faso, West Africa

- Location within Burkina Faso, West Africa
- Coordinates: 12°10′46″N 0°21′6″W
- Country: Burkina Faso
- Region: Centre-Est
- Province: Kouritenga
- Department: Koupéla
- Elevation: 296 m (971 ft)

Population (2019 census)
  - Total: 49,372
- Time zone: UTC+0 (GMT)

Koupéla is a city in Burkina Faso, lying east of Ouagadougou (137 km or 85 mi) and west of Fada-Ngourma (82 km or 51 mi) in an area settled by the Mossi people. It is known for its pottery and sculptures; these were made from natural clays found in the area. In 1900 Koupéla became the site of the first Catholic mission in Burkina Faso. Today it is the seat of an archdiocese, and contains a cathedral.
