= Gounghin, Gounghin =

Commune in Burkina Faso

Gounghin
- Location within Burkina Faso
- Coordinates: 12°08′40.3″N 0°03′54.3″W
- Country: Burkina Faso
- Province: Kouritenga
- Department: Gounghin
- Elevation: 297 m (974 ft)

Population (2006)
  - Total: 921
- Time zone: UTC+0 (GMT)

Gounghin, also spelled Gougue and also called Gougen-Pissi, is a commune in the Gounghin Department of Kouritenga Province in the Centre-Est region of Burkina Faso. It had a population of 921 in 2006.

== Demographics ==
Year	Population
1985	637
1996	5,767
2006	921

=== Neighbourhoods ===
Neighbourhood	Population (2006)
Gandentenga	442
Natenga	295
Sitenga	74
Tensobtenga	0
Waogtenga	110
