= Kouritenga Province =

Coordinates: 12°11′N 0°26′W

Kouritenga
- Province
- Location in Burkina Faso

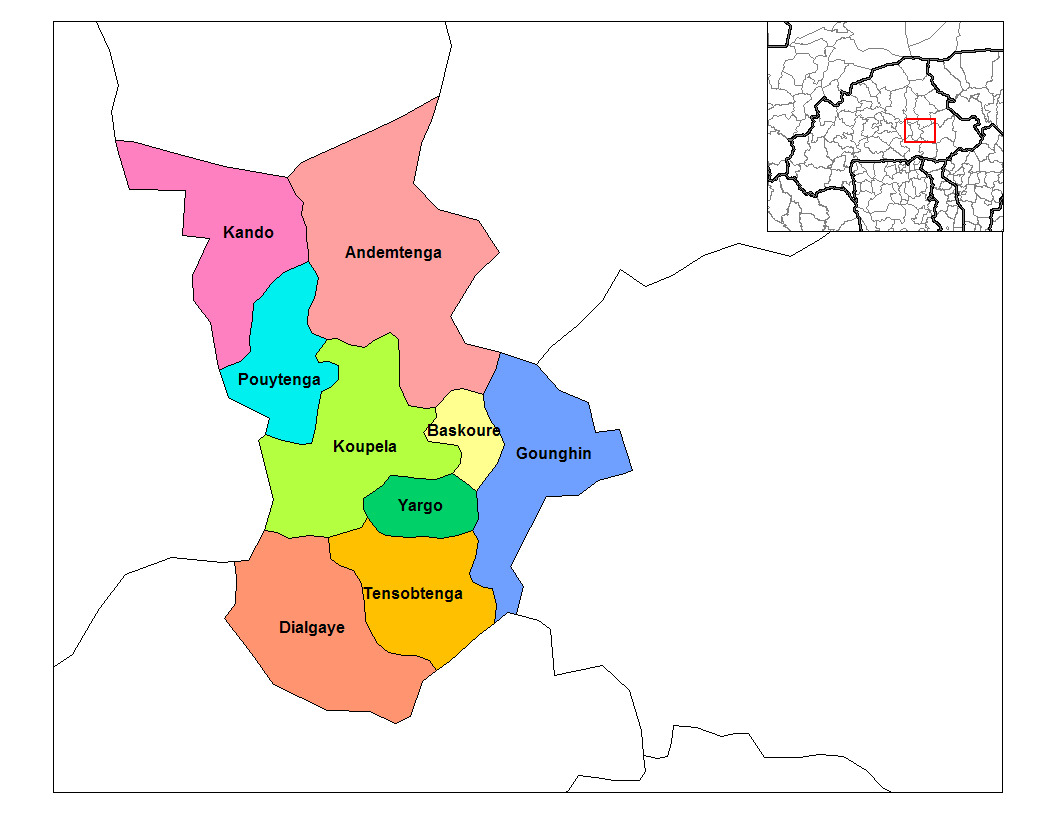
- Provincial map of its departments
- Country: Burkina Faso
- Region: Centre-Est Region
- Capital: Koupéla

Area
  - Province: 2,621 km^{2} (1,012 sq mi)

Population (2019 census)
  - Province: 479,930
  - Density: 183.1/km^{2} (474.3/sq mi)
  - Urban: 145,867
- Time zone: UTC+0 (GMT 0)

Kouritenga (sometimes spelt Kourittenga) is one of the 45 provinces of Burkina Faso, located in its Centre-Est Region. In 2019, the province had a population of 479,930. Its capital is Koupéla.

== Departments ==
Kouritenga is divided into 9 departments:

The Departments of Kouritenga
Department	Capital	Population (Census 2006)
Andemtenga Department	Andemtenga	51,044
Baskouré Department	Baskouré	12,792
Dialgaye Department	Dialgaye	37,778
Gounghin Department	Gounghin	35,172
Kando Department	Kando	28,380
Koupéla Department	Koupéla	57,632
Pouytenga Department	Pouytenga	72,217
Tensobentenga Department	Tensobentenga	20,719
Yargo Department	Yargo	14,608

== Demographics ==
Year	Population
1985	198,486
2006	330,342

== See also ==
- Regions of Burkina Faso
- Provinces of Burkina Faso
- Departments of Burkina Faso
