= Zangogho =

Zangogho Zangogo
- Location in Burkina Faso
- Coordinates: 11°52′N 1°12′W
- Country: Burkina Faso
- Region: Centre-Sud Region
- Province: Bazèga Province
- Department: Toece Department

Population (2019)
  - Total: 965

Zangogho is a town in the Toece Department of Bazèga Province in central Burkina Faso.

== Geography ==
Located south-west of the town of Toece nearest towns and villages include Kaongo (1.4 nm), Binsteguere (1.4 nm), Daiassemnore (2.0 nm), Tibe (2.0 nm), Tammsse(3.6 nm), Peno(13.0 nm) and Zorgho (5.0 nm).

Population
Year	Pop.	±%
1985	867	—
2006	1,075	+24.0%
2019	965	−10.2%
