= Dawelgué =

- Location in Burkina Faso
- Coordinates: 12°5′56″N 1°30′51″W
- Country: Burkina Faso
- Region: Centre-Sud Region
- Province: Bazèga Province
- Department: Saponé Department

Population (2019)
  - Total: 642

Dawelgué is a village in the Saponé Department of Bazèga Province in central Burkina Faso.

== Geography ==
Dawelgué is located in the department of Saponé 12 km from the department's capital, on the Saponé – Kombissiri border. It has about 459 inhabitants. Naaba Koabga Tigré founded it around the 16th century,

Population
Year	Pop.	±%
1985	548	—
2006	289	−47.3%
2019	642	+122.1%

== Health ==
The closest health center to Dawelgué is the medical center of Saponé.

Population
Year	Pop.	±%
1985	548	—
2006	289	−47.3%
2019	642	+122.1%
