= Zingdéghin =

- Country: Burkina Faso
- Region: Centre-Sud Region
- Province: Bazèga Province
- Department: Kombissiri Department

Population (2019)
  - Total: 531

Zingdéghin is a village in the Kombissiri Department of Bazèga Province in central Burkina Faso.

== Demographics ==
Population
Year	Pop.	±%
1985	491	—
2006	482	−1.8%
2019	531	+10.2%
