= Ouarmini =

Ouarmini Warmini
- Location in Burkina Faso
- Coordinates: 12°10′55″N 1°31′23″W
- Country: Burkina Faso
- Region: Centre-Sud Region
- Province: Bazèga Province
- Department: Saponé Department

Population (2019)
  - Total: 772

Ouarmini is a town in the Saponé Department of Bazèga Province in central Burkina Faso.

Population
Year	Pop.	±%
1985	1,667	—
2006	1,568	−5.9%
2019	772	−50.8%
