= Saré de Guirgo =

- Country: Burkina Faso
- Region: Centre-Sud Region
- Province: Bazèga Province
- Department: Kombissiri Department

Population (2019)
  - Total: 517

Saré de Guirgo is a village in the Kombissiri Department of Bazèga Province in central Burkina Faso.

Population
Year	Pop.	±%
2006	16	—
2019	517	+3131.2%
