= Yougoudri =

Yougoudri Yougoudry
- Country: Burkina Faso
- Region: Centre-Sud Region
- Province: Bazèga Province
- Department: Toece Department

Population (2019)
  - Total: 692

Yougoudri is a village in the Toece Department of Bazèga Province in central Burkina Faso.

Population
Year	Pop.	±%
1985	320	—
2006	328	+2.5%
2019	692	+111.0%
