= Konlobwamdé =

- Location in Burkina Faso
- Coordinates: 11°54′N 1°24′W
- Country: Burkina Faso
- Region: Centre-Sud Region
- Province: Bazèga Province
- Department: Kombissiri Department

Population (2019)
  - Total: 570

Konlobwamdé is a village in the Kombissiri Department of Bazèga Province in central Burkina Faso.

Population
Year	Pop.	±%
1985	483	—
2006	486	+0.6%
2019	570	+17.3%
