= Silkouka =

- Location in Burkina Faso
- Coordinates: 11°49′N 1°22′W
- Country: Burkina Faso
- Region: Centre-Sud Region
- Province: Bazèga Province
- Department: Toece Department

Population (2019)
  - Total: 461

Silkouka is a village in the Toece Department of Bazèga Province in central Burkina Faso.

Population
Year	Pop.	±%
1985	380	—
2006	438	+15.3%
2019	461	+5.3%
