= Boussougou =

- Location in Burkina Faso
- Coordinates: 11°55′N 1°26′W
- Country: Burkina Faso
- Region: Centre-Sud Region
- Province: Bazèga Province
- Department: Kombissiri Department

Population (2019)
  - Total: 643

Boussougou is a village in the Kombissiri Department of Bazèga Province in central Burkina Faso.

Population
Year	Pop.	±%
1985	531	—
2006	569	+7.2%
2019	643	+13.0%
