= Nagnesna =

Nagnesna Nagnesma
- Interactive map of Nagnesna
- Country: Burkina Faso
- Region: Centre-Sud Region
- Province: Bazèga Province
- Department: Toece Department

Population (2019)
  - Total: 1,396

Nagnesna is a town in the Toece Department of Bazèga Province in central Burkina Faso.

Population
Year	Pop.	±%
1985	1,112	—
2006	1,492	+34.2%
2019	1,396	−6.4%
