= Doutinga =

Doutinga Doumtinga
- Country: Burkina Faso
- Region: Centre-Sud Region
- Province: Bazèga Province
- Department: Saponé Department

Population (2019)
  - Total: 653

Doutinga or Doumtinga is a village in the Saponé Department of Bazèga Province in central Burkina Faso.

Population
Year	Pop.	±%
1985	631	—
2006	522	−17.3%
2019	653	+25.1%
