= Koussala =

- Location in Burkina Faso
- Coordinates: 11°57′N 1°16′W
- Country: Burkina Faso
- Region: Centre-Sud Region
- Province: Bazèga Province
- Department: Toece Department

Population (2019)
  - Total: 1,683

Koussala is a town in the Toece Department of Bazèga Province in central Burkina Faso.

Population
Year	Pop.	±%
1985	1,191	—
2006	1,394	+17.0%
2019	1,683	+20.7%
