= Koumnéré =

- Location in Burkina Faso
- Coordinates: 11°50′N 1°22′W
- Country: Burkina Faso
- Region: Centre-Sud Region
- Province: Bazèga Province
- Department: Toece Department

Population (2019)
  - Total: 701

Koumnéré or Komnere is a village in the Toece Department of Bazèga Province in central Burkina Faso.

Population
Year	Pop.	±%
1985	533	—
2006	725	+36.0%
2019	701	−3.3%
