= Konkossé =

- Location in Burkina Faso
- Coordinates: 11°53′N 1°23′W
- Country: Burkina Faso
- Region: Centre-Sud Region
- Province: Bazèga Province
- Department: Kombissiri Department

Population (2019)
  - Total: 136

Konkossé is a village in the Kombissiri Department of Bazèga Province in central Burkina Faso.

Population
| Year | Pop. | ±% |
|---|---|---|
| 1985 | 111 | — |
| 2006 | 118 | +6.3% |
| 2019 | 136 | +15.3% |
