= Kierma =

- Location in Burkina Faso
- Coordinates: 12°1′13″N 1°15′0″W
- Country: Burkina Faso
- Region: Centre-Sud Region
- Province: Bazèga Province
- Department: Kombissiri Department

Population (2019)
  - Total: 2,235

Kierma is a town in the Kombissiri Department of Bazèga Province in central Burkina Faso.

Population
Year	Pop.	±%
1985	997	—
2006	1,276	+28.0%
2019	2,235	+75.2%
