= Boromtinga =

Village in Bazèga Province, Burkina Faso

- Interactive map of Boromtinga
- Coordinates: 11°50′N 1°13′W
- Country: Burkina Faso
- Region: Centre-Sud Region
- Province: Bazèga Province
- Department: Toece Department

Population (2019)
  - Total: 1,092

Boromtinga is a village in the Toece Department of Bazèga Province in central Burkina Faso.

Population
Year	Pop.	±%
1985	683	—
2006	881	+29.0%
2019	1,092	+24.0%
