= Kond-Koikin =

- Country: Burkina Faso
- Region: Centre-Sud Region
- Province: Bazèga Province
- Department: Kombissiri Department

Population (2019)
  - Total: 444

Kond-Koikin is a village in the Kombissiri Department of Bazèga Province in central Burkina Faso.

Population
| Year | Pop. | ±% |
|---|---|---|
| 2006 | 326 | — |
| 2019 | 444 | +36.2% |
