= Kuizili =

Coordinates: 12°03′N 1°32′W

Kuizili Kouizili
- Interactive map of Kuizili
- Country: Burkina Faso
- Region: Centre-Sud Region
- Province: Bazèga Province
- Department: Saponé Department

Population (2019)
  - Total: 1,479

Kuizili is a town in the Saponé Department of Bazèga Province in central Burkina Faso.

Population
Year	Pop.	±%
1985	957	—
2006	1,360	+42.1%
2019	1,479	+8.7%
