= Koulpèlga =

Koulpèlga Kouilpèlga
- Location in Burkina Faso
- Coordinates: 12°6′8″N 1°14′2″W
- Country: Burkina Faso
- Region: Centre-Sud Region
- Province: Bazèga Province
- Department: Kombissiri Department

Population (2019)
  - Total: 772

Koulpèlga is a village in the Kombissiri Department of Bazèga Province in central Burkina Faso.

Population
| Year | Pop. | ±% |
|---|---|---|
| 1985 | 432 | — |
| 2006 | 828 | +91.7% |
| 2019 | 772 | −6.8% |
