= Zorgho, Bazèga =

Zorgho
- Village
- Location in Burkina Faso
- Coordinates: 11°42′N 1°20′W
- Country: Burkina Faso
- Region: Centre-Sud Region
- Province: Bazèga Province
- Department: Toece Department

Population (201i)
  - Total: 632

Zorgho, Bazèga is a village in the Toece Department of Bazèga Province in central Burkina Faso.

Population
Year	Pop.	±%
1985	335	—
2006	554	+65.4%
2019	632	+14.1%
