= Wemtinga =

- Location in Burkina Faso
- Coordinates: 11°58′N 1°22′W
- Country: Burkina Faso
- Region: Centre-Sud Region
- Province: Bazèga Province
- Department: Kombissiri Department

Population (2019)
  - Total: 794

Wemtinga is a village in the Kombissiri Department of Bazèga Province in central Burkina Faso.

Population
| Year | Pop. | ±% |
|---|---|---|
| 1985 | 799 | — |
| 2006 | 761 | −4.8% |
| 2019 | 794 | +4.3% |
