= Goudou =

- Location in Burkina Faso
- Coordinates: 11°50′N 1°18′W
- Country: Burkina Faso
- Region: Centre-Sud Region
- Province: Bazèga Province
- Department: Toece Department

Population (2019)
  - Total: 812

Goudou is a village in the Toece Department of Bazèga Province in central Burkina Faso.

Population
Year	Pop.	±%
1985	717	—
2006	936	+30.5%
2019	812	−13.2%
