= Bédogo-Nabiga =

- Country: Burkina Faso
- Region: Centre-Sud Region
- Province: Bazèga Province
- Department: Kombissiri Department

Population (2019)
  - Total: 578

Bédogo-Nabiga or Bédogo-Natinga is a village in the Kombissiri Department of Bazèga Province in central Burkina Faso.

Population
Year	Pop.	±%
1985	426	—
2006	471	+10.6%
2019	578	+22.7%
