= Banébanto =

Banébanto Banembanto
- Country: Burkina Faso
- Region: Centre-Sud Region
- Province: Bazèga Province
- Department: Saponé Department

Population (2019)
  - Total: 1,089

Banébanto is a town in the Saponé Department of Bazèga Province in central Burkina Faso.

Population
Year	Pop.	±%
1985	576	—
2006	1,315	+128.3%
2019	1,089	−17.2%
