= Kougpèla =

- Location in Burkina Faso
- Coordinates: 11°53′N 1°24′W
- Country: Burkina Faso
- Region: Centre-Sud Region
- Province: Bazèga Province
- Department: Kombissiri Department

Population (2019)
  - Total: 293

Kougpèla is a village in the Kombissiri Department of Bazèga Province in central Burkina Faso.

Population
Year	Pop.	±%
1985	343	—
2006	498	+45.2%
2019	293	−41.2%
