= Boulougou =

- Location in Burkina Faso
- Coordinates: 11°56′N 1°38′W
- Country: Burkina Faso
- Region: Centre-Sud Region
- Province: Bazèga Province
- Department: Saponé Department

Population (2019)
  - Total: 208

Boulougou is a village in the Saponé Department of Bazèga Province in central Burkina Faso.

Population
Year	Pop.	±%
1985	620	—
2006	109	−82.4%
2019	208	+90.8%
