= Watinga =

Coordinates: 12°05′N 1°37′W

Watinga Ouatinga
- Interactive map of Watinga
- Country: Burkina Faso
- Region: Centre-Sud Region
- Province: Bazèga Province
- Department: Saponé Department

Population (2019)
  - Total: 467

Watinga or Ouatinga is a village in the Saponé Department of Bazèga Province in central Burkina Faso.

Population
Year	Pop.	±%
1985	599	—
2006	490	−18.2%
2019	467	−4.7%
