= Goubla =

- Location in Burkina Faso
- Coordinates: 11°45′N 1°17′W
- Country: Burkina Faso
- Region: Centre-Sud Region
- Province: Bazèga Province
- Department: Toece Department

Population (2019)
  - Total: 537

Goubla is a village in the Toece Department of Bazèga Province in central Burkina Faso.

Population
Year	Pop.	±%
1985	268	—
2006	403	+50.4%
2019	537	+33.3%
