= Kalwiga =

- Location in Burkina Faso
- Coordinates: 11°49′N 1°25′W
- Country: Burkina Faso
- Region: Centre-Sud Region
- Province: Bazèga Province
- Department: Kombissiri Department

Population (2019)
  - Total: 683

Kalwiga (or Kaléwiga) is a village in the Kombissiri Department of Bazèga Province in central Burkina Faso.

Population
Year	Pop.	±%
1985	300	—
2006	505	+68.3%
2019	683	+35.2%
