= Bonkoré =

- Location in Burkina Faso
- Coordinates: 12°6′30″N 1°28′30″W
- Country: Burkina Faso
- Region: Centre-Sud Region
- Province: Bazèga Province
- Department: Saponé Department

Population (2019)
  - Total: 1,256

Bonkoré is a village in the Saponé Department of Bazèga Province in central Burkina Faso.

Population
Year	Pop.	±%
1985	736	—
2006	868	+17.9%
2019	1,256	+44.7%
