= Fourgo =

- Interactive map of Fourgo
- Country: Burkina Faso
- Region: Centre-Sud Region
- Province: Bazèga Province
- Department: Kombissiri Department

Population (2019)
  - Total: 1,312

Fourgo is a town in the Kombissiri Department of Bazèga Province in central Burkina Faso.

Population
Year	Pop.	±%
1985	967	—
2006	1,094	+13.1%
2019	1,312	+19.9%
