= Loussa =

- Location in Burkina Faso
- Coordinates: 11°52′N 1°18′W
- Country: Burkina Faso
- Region: Centre-Sud Region
- Province: Bazèga Province
- Department: Toece Department

Population (2019)
  - Total: 1,034

Loussa is a village in the Toece Department of Bazèga Province in central Burkina Faso.

Population
| Year | Pop. | ±% |
|---|---|---|
| 1985 | 1,033 | — |
| 2006 | 969 | −6.2% |
| 2019 | 1,034 | +6.7% |
