= Yansaré =

- Country: Burkina Faso
- Region: Centre-Sud
- Province: Bazèga
- Department: Saponé

Population (2019)
  - Total: 1,222

Yansaré is a town in the Saponé Department of Bazèga Province in central Burkina Faso.

Population
Year	Pop.	±%
1985	993	—
2006	1,097	+10.5%
2019	1,222	+11.4%
