= Pawamtoré =

- Location in Burkina Faso
- Coordinates: 11°52′N 1°16′W
- Country: Burkina Faso
- Region: Centre-Sud Region
- Province: Bazèga Province
- Department: Toece Department

Population (2019)
  - Total: 1,035

Pawamtoré is a town in the Toece Department of Bazèga Province in central Burkina Faso.

Population
Year	Pop.	±%
1985	1,063	—
2006	1,059	−0.4%
2019	1,035	−2.3%
