= Manegsombo =

Coordinates: 12°05′N 1°16′W

- Interactive map of Manegsombo
- Country: Burkina Faso
- Region: Centre-Sud Region
- Province: Bazèga Province
- Department: Kombissiri Department

Population (2019)
  - Total: 531

Manegsombo is a village in the Kombissiri Department of Bazèga Province in central Burkina Faso.

Population
Year	Pop.	±%
1985	260	—
2006	389	+49.6%
2019	531	+36.5%
