= Monomtenga =

Monomtenga Monontinga
- Country: Burkina Faso
- Region: Centre-Sud Region
- Province: Bazèga Province
- Department: Kombissiri Department

Population (2019)
  - Total: 1,542

Monomtenga is a town in the Kombissiri Department of Bazèga Province in central Burkina Faso.

Population
Year	Pop.	±%
1985	1,305	—
2006	1,543	+18.2%
2019	1,542	−0.1%
