= Konioudou =

- Location in Burkina Faso
- Coordinates: 12°3′2″N 1°16′24″W
- Country: Burkina Faso
- Region: Centre-Sud Region
- Province: Bazèga Province
- Department: Kombissiri Department

Population (2019)
  - Total: 1,995

Konioudou is a town in the Kombissiri Department of Bazèga Province in central Burkina Faso.

Population
Year	Pop.	±%
1985	1,029	—
2006	1,939	+88.4%
2019	1,995	+2.9%
