= Pazouétfom =

- Country: Burkina Faso
- Region: Centre-Sud Region
- Province: Bazèga Province
- Department: Saponé Department

Population (2019)
  - Total: 305

Pazouétfom is a village in the Saponé Department of Bazèga Province in central Burkina Faso.

Population
Year	Pop.	±%
2006	237	—
2019	305	+28.7%
