= Ouidi-Wafé =

- Country: Burkina Faso
- Region: Centre-Sud Region
- Province: Bazèga Province
- Department: Saponé Department

Population (2019)
  - Total: 1,258

Ouidi-Wafé is a village in the Saponé Department of Bazèga Province in central Burkina Faso.

Population
Year	Pop.	±%
2006	730	—
2019	1,258	+72.3%
