= Balonghin =

- Location in Burkina Faso
- Coordinates: 12°3′0″N 1°29′50″W
- Country: Burkina Faso
- Region: Centre-Sud Region
- Province: Bazèga Province
- Department: Saponé Department

Population (2019)
  - Total: 1,596

Balonghin is a town in the Saponé Department of Bazèga Province in central Burkina Faso.

Population
Year	Pop.	±%
1985	1,491	—
2006	1,515	+1.6%
2019	1,596	+5.3%
