= Bédogo-Silmissi =

- Country: Burkina Faso
- Region: Centre-Sud Region
- Province: Bazèga Province
- Department: Kombissiri Department

Population (2019)
  - Total: 656

Bédogo-Silmissi is a village in the Kombissiri Department of Bazèga Province in central Burkina Faso.

Population
| Year | Pop. | ±% |
|---|---|---|
| 1985 | 447 | — |
| 2006 | 509 | +13.9% |
| 2019 | 656 | +28.9% |
