= Toémiga =

- Location in Burkina Faso
- Coordinates: 11°58′N 1°19′W
- Country: Burkina Faso
- Region: Centre-Sud Region
- Province: Bazèga Province
- Department: Kombissiri Department

Population (2019)
  - Total: 718

Toémiga is a village in the Kombissiri Department of Bazèga Province in central Burkina Faso, West Africa.

Population
Year	Pop.	±%
1985	597	—
2006	671	+12.4%
2019	718	+7.0%
