= Goudri =

- Country: Burkina Faso
- Region: Centre-Sud Region
- Province: Bazèga Province
- Department: Kombissiri Department

Population (2019)
  - Total: 1,091

Goudri is a town in the Kombissiri Department of Bazèga Province in central Burkina Faso.

Population
Year	Pop.	±%
1985	1,096	—
2006	1,223	+11.6%
2019	1,091	−10.8%
