= Kamsando =

- Location in Burkina Faso
- Coordinates: 12°0′N 1°18′W
- Country: Burkina Faso
- Region: Centre-Sud Region
- Province: Bazèga Province
- Department: Kombissiri Department

Population (2019)
  - Total: 1,112

Kamsando is a town in the Kombissiri Department of Bazèga Province in central Burkina Faso.

Population
Year	Pop.	±%
1985	1,032	—
2006	1,046	+1.4%
2019	1,112	+6.3%
