= Poédogo =

Poédogo may refer to:

- Poédogo, Bazèga (disambiguation)
  - Poédogo, Doulougou
  - Poédogo, Kombissiri
- Poédogo, Ganzourgou
