= Saré de Tuili =

- Country: Burkina Faso
- Region: Centre-Sud Region
- Province: Bazèga Province
- Department: Kombissiri Department

Population (2019)
  - Total: 348

Saré de Tuili is a village in the Kombissiri Department of Bazèga Province in Centre-Sud Region of central Burkina Faso.

Population
| Year | Pop. | ±% |
|---|---|---|
| 2006 | 351 | — |
| 2019 | 348 | −0.9% |
