= Koagma =

- Location in Burkina Faso
- Coordinates: 12°2′0″N 1°34′16″W
- Country: Burkina Faso
- Region: Centre-Sud Region
- Province: Bazèga Province
- Department: Saponé Department

Population (2019)
  - Total: 418

Koagma is a town in the Saponé Department of Bazèga Province in central Burkina Faso.

Population
Year	Pop.	±%
1985	1,075	—
2006	1,087	+1.1%
2019	418	−61.5%
