= Bonsrima =

Village in Bazèga Province, Burkina Faso

- Interactive map of Bonsrima
- Coordinates: 11°56′04″N 1°13′35″W
- Country: Burkina Faso
- Region: Centre-Sud Region
- Province: Bazèga Province
- Department: Toece Department

Population (2019)
  - Total: 1,752

Bonsrima is a town in the Toece Department of Bazèga Province in central Burkina Faso.

Population
Year	Pop.	±%
1985	1,279	—
2006	1,252	−2.1%
2019	1,752	+39.9%
