= Pissi =

Pissi may refer to several settlements in Burkina Faso:

- Pissi, Kombissiri, a village in Kombissiri Department, Bazèga Province
- Pissi, Saponé, a village in Saponé Department, Bazèga Province
- Pissi, Bam, a village in Zimtenga Department, Bam Province
- Pissi, Ganzourgou, a village in Zam Department, Ganzourgou Province
- Pissi, Gnagna, a village in Bilanga Department, Gnagna Province
- Pissi-Zaoce, a village in Gounghin Department, Kouritenga Province
