= Baguemnini =

- Location in Burkina Faso
- Coordinates: 12°0′51″N 1°33′0″W
- Country: Burkina Faso
- Region: Centre-Sud Region
- Province: Bazèga Province
- Department: Saponé Department

Population (2019)
  - Total: 1,074

Baguemnini is a village in the Saponé Department of Bazèga Province in central Burkina Faso.

Population
Year	Pop.	±%
1985	1,083	—
2006	906	−16.3%
2019	1,074	+18.5%
