= Sambin, Saponé =

Sambin
- Interactive map of Sambin
- Country: Burkina Faso
- Region: Centre-Sud Region
- Province: Bazèga Province
- Department: Saponé Department

Population (2019)
  - Total: 741

Sambin is a village in the Saponé Department of Bazèga Province in central Burkina Faso.

Population
| Year | Pop. | ±% |
|---|---|---|
| 1985 | 516 | — |
| 2006 | 727 | +40.9% |
| 2019 | 741 | +1.9% |
