= Tingandogo =

- Location in Burkina Faso
- Coordinates: 12°3′2″N 1°18′26″W
- Country: Burkina Faso
- Region: Centre-Sud Region
- Province: Bazèga Province
- Department: Kombissiri Department

Population (2019)
  - Total: 812

Tingandogo or Tengandogo is a village in the Kombissiri Department of Bazèga Province in central Burkina Faso.

Population
Year	Pop.	±%
1985	548	—
2006	813	+48.4%
2019	812	−0.1%
