= Koumsaga =

Koumsaga Koumsaka
- Location in Burkina Faso
- Coordinates: 12°2′55″N 1°32′29″W
- Country: Burkina Faso
- Region: Centre-Sud Region
- Province: Bazèga Province
- Department: Saponé Department

Population (2019)
  - Total: 1,441

Koumsaga is a town in the Saponé Department of Bazèga Province in central Burkina Faso.

Population
Year	Pop.	±%
1985		—
2006	1,366	—
2019	1,441	+5.5%
