= Masgo =

Village in Bazèga Province, Burkina Faso

- Interactive map of Masgo
- Coordinates: 11°52′02″N 1°15′23″W
- Country: Burkina Faso
- Region: Centre-Sud Region
- Province: Bazèga Province
- Department: Toece Department

Population (2019)
  - Total: 1,167

Masgo is a town in the Toece Department of Bazèga Province in central Burkina Faso.

Population
Year	Pop.	±%
1985	1,094	—
2006	1,229	+12.3%
2019	1,167	−5.0%
