= Lilbouré =

- Location in Burkina Faso
- Coordinates: 11°45′N 1°19′W
- Country: Burkina Faso
- Region: Centre-Sud Region
- Province: Bazèga Province
- Department: Toece Department

Population (2019)
  - Total: 1,167

Lilbouré is a village in the Toece Department of Bazèga Province in central Burkina Faso.

Population
Year	Pop.	±%
1985	717	—
2006	1,026	+43.1%
2019	1,167	+13.7%
