= Timanemboin =

- Location in Burkina Faso
- Coordinates: 12°1′55″N 1°35′22″W
- Country: Burkina Faso
- Region: Centre-Sud Region
- Province: Bazèga Province
- Department: Saponé Department

Population (2019)
  - Total: 582

Timanemboin is a town in the Saponé Department of Bazèga Province in central Burkina Faso.

Population
Year	Pop.	±%
1985	1,119	—
2006	1,275	+13.9%
2019	582	−54.4%
