= Kiendbingré =

Kiendbingré Kiedbingré
- Country: Burkina Faso
- Region: Centre-Sud Region
- Province: Bazèga Province
- Department: Kombissiri Department

Population (2019)
  - Total: 405

Kiendbingré is a village in the Kombissiri Department of Bazèga Province in central Burkina Faso.

Population
Year	Pop.	±%
1985	361	—
2006	372	+3.0%
2019	405	+8.9%
