= Kougpaka =

- Location in Burkina Faso
- Coordinates: 12°0′0″N 1°41′0″W
- Country: Burkina Faso
- Region: Centre-Sud Region
- Province: Bazèga Province
- Department: Saponé Department

Population (2019)
  - Total: 1,101

Kougpaka is a town in the Saponé Department of Bazèga Province in central Burkina Faso.

Population
Year	Pop.	±%
1985	812	—
2006	1,121	+38.1%
2019	1,101	−1.8%
