= Binsboumbou =

- Location in Burkina Faso
- Coordinates: 11°52′N 1°14′W
- Country: Burkina Faso
- Region: Centre-Sud Region
- Province: Bazèga Province
- Department: Toece Department

Population (2019)
  - Total: 1,457

Binsboumbou is a town in the Toece Department of Bazèga Province in central Burkina Faso.

Population
Year	Pop.	±%
1985	1,125	—
2006	1,453	+29.2%
2019	1,457	+0.3%
