= Toanga =

- Location in Burkina Faso
- Coordinates: 12°0′27″N 1°14′0″W
- Country: Burkina Faso
- Region: Centre-Sud Region
- Province: Bazèga Province
- Department: Kombissiri Department

Population (2019)
  - Total: 2,067

Toanga is a town in the Kombissiri Department of Bazèga Province in central Burkina Faso.

Population
Year	Pop.	±%
1985	1,383	—
2006	1,880	+35.9%
2019	2,067	+9.9%
