= Damkiéta =

- Location in Burkina Faso
- Coordinates: 12°1′51″N 1°38′4″W
- Country: Burkina Faso
- Region: Centre-Sud Region
- Province: Bazèga Province
- Department: Saponé Department

Population (2019)
  - Total: 921

Damkiéta is a village in the Saponé Department of Bazèga Province in central Burkina Faso.

Population
Year	Pop.	±%
1985	698	—
2006	902	+29.2%
2019	921	+2.1%
