= Targho =

- Location in Burkina Faso
- Coordinates: 11°55′4″N 1°39′24″W
- Country: Burkina Faso
- Region: Centre-Sud Region
- Province: Bazèga Province
- Department: Saponé Department

Population (2019)
  - Total: 3,768

Targho is a town in the Saponé Department of Bazèga Province in central Burkina Faso.

Population
Year	Pop.	±%
1985	2,584	—
2006	3,338	+29.2%
2019	3,768	+12.9%
