= Sabraogo =

- Location in Burkina Faso
- Coordinates: 11°59′N 1°16′W
- Country: Burkina Faso
- Region: Centre-Sud Region
- Province: Bazèga Province
- Department: Kombissiri Department

Population (2019)
  - Total: 1,457

Sabraogo is a town in the Kombissiri Department of Bazèga Province in central Burkina Faso.

Population
Year	Pop.	±%
1985	1,041	—
2006	1,306	+25.5%
2019	1,457	+11.6%
