= Batinga =

- Location in Burkina Faso
- Coordinates: 11°54′N 1°27′W
- Country: Burkina Faso
- Region: Centre-Sud Region
- Province: Bazèga Province
- Department: Kombissiri Department

Population (2019)
  - Total: 617

Batinga is a village in the Kombissiri Department of Bazèga Province in central Burkina Faso.

Population
Year	Pop.	±%
1985	334	—
2006	421	+26.0%
2019	617	+46.6%
