= Koumasgho =

- Country: Burkina Faso
- Region: Centre-Sud Region
- Province: Bazèga Province
- Department: Toece Department

Population (2019)
  - Total: 314

Koumasgho is a village in the Toece Department of Bazèga Province in central Burkina Faso.

Population
Year	Pop.	±%
1985	154	—
2006	402	+161.0%
2019	314	−21.9%
