= Komtigré =

- Location within Burkina Faso
- Coordinates: 12°02′N 1°29′W
- Country: Burkina Faso
- Region: Centre-Sud Region
- Province: Bazèga Province
- Department: Kombissiri Department

Population (2019)
  - Total: 421

Komtigré is a village in the Kombissiri Department of Bazèga Province in central Burkina Faso.

Population
Year	Pop.	±%
1985	333	—
2006	419	+25.8%
2019	421	+0.5%
