= Toudou =

- Location in Burkina Faso
- Coordinates: 11°52′N 1°19′W
- Country: Burkina Faso
- Region: Centre-Sud Region
- Province: Bazèga Province
- Department: Toece Department

Population (2019)
  - Total: 1,299

Toudou is a town in the Toece Department of Bazèga Province in central Burkina Faso.

Population
Year	Pop.	±%
1985	1,300	—
2006	1,104	−15.1%
2019	1,299	+17.7%
