= Koulpellé =

- Location in Burkina Faso
- Coordinates: 11°55′N 1°16′W
- Country: Burkina Faso
- Region: Centre-Sud Region
- Province: Bazèga Province
- Department: Toece Department

Population (2019)
  - Total: 615

Koulpellé or Koulpele is a village in the Toece Department of Bazèga Province in central Burkina Faso.

Population
Year	Pop.	±%
1985	670	—
2006	573	−14.5%
2019	615	+7.3%
