= Dagouma =

- Location in Burkina Faso
- Coordinates: 11°55′N 1°17′W
- Country: Burkina Faso
- Region: Centre-Sud Region
- Province: Bazèga Province
- Department: Toece Department

Population (2019)
  - Total: 1,565

Dagouma is a town in the Toece Department of Bazèga Province in central Burkina Faso.

Population
| Year | Pop. | ±% |
|---|---|---|
| 1985 | 1,304 | — |
| 2006 | 1,549 | +18.8% |
| 2019 | 1,565 | +1.0% |
