= Bissiga =

Bissiga may refer to several place in Burkina Faso:

Two places in Bazèga Province

- Bissiga, Kombissiri
- Bissiga, Saponé

or:

- Bissiga, Boulgou
- Bissiga, Ganzourgou
