= Tinsobtinga =

- Location in Burkina Faso
- Coordinates: 11°50′N 1°20′W
- Country: Burkina Faso
- Region: Centre-Sud Region
- Province: Bazèga Province
- Department: Toece Department

Population (2019)
  - Total: 643

Tinsobtinga is a village in the Toece Department of Bazèga Province in central Burkina Faso. (As of 2005)

Population
Year	Pop.	±%
1985	598	—
2006	639	+6.9%
2019	643	+0.6%
