= Goncé =

- Location in Burkina Faso
- Coordinates: 12°1′55″N 1°17′21″W
- Country: Burkina Faso
- Region: Centre-Sud Region
- Province: Bazèga Province
- Department: Kombissiri Department

Population (2019)
  - Total: 1,093

Goncé is a village in the Kombissiri Department of Bazèga Province in central Burkina Faso.

Population
Year	Pop.	±%
1985	383	—
2006	857	+123.8%
2019	1,093	+27.5%
