= Niongho =

Niongho Niongo
- Country: Burkina Faso
- Region: Centre-Sud Region
- Province: Bazèga Province
- Department: Toece Department

Population (2019)
  - Total: 1,019

Niongho is a town in the Toece Department of Bazèga Province in central Burkina Faso.

Population
Year	Pop.	±%
1985	815	—
2006	964	+18.3%
2019	1,019	+5.7%
