= Nionsna =

- Country: Burkina Faso
- Region: Centre-Sud Region
- Province: Bazèga Province
- Department: Saponé Department

Population (2019)
  - Total: 1,202

Nionsna is a town in the Saponé Department of Bazèga Province in central Burkina Faso.

Population
| Year | Pop. | ±% |
|---|---|---|
| 1985 | 1,875 | — |
| 2006 | 1,923 | +2.6% |
| 2019 | 1,202 | −37.5% |
