= Toundou =

- Location in Burkina Faso
- Coordinates: 12°1′37″N 1°27′8″W
- Country: Burkina Faso
- Region: Centre-Sud Region
- Province: Bazèga Province
- Department: Saponé Department

Population (2019)
  - Total: 966

Toundou is a village in the Saponé Department of Bazèga Province in central Burkina Faso.

Population
Year	Pop.	±%
1985	761	—
2006	881	+15.8%
2019	966	+9.6%
