= Diepo =

- Location in Burkina Faso
- Coordinates: 12°8′41″N 1°28′21″W
- Country: Burkina Faso
- Region: Centre-Sud Region
- Province: Bazèga Province
- Department: Saponé Department

Population (2019)
  - Total: 875

Diepo is a village in the Saponé Department of Bazèga Province in central Burkina Faso.

Population
Year	Pop.	±%
2006	927	—
2019	875	−5.6%
