= Tuili, Burkina Faso =

Tuili
- Location in Burkina Faso
- Coordinates: 11°59′N 1°23′W
- Country: Burkina Faso
- Region: Centre-Sud Region
- Province: Bazèga Province
- Department: Kombissiri Department

Population (2019)
  - Total: 2,684

Tuili is a town in the Kombissiri Department of Bazèga Province in central Burkina Faso.

Population
Year	Pop.	±%
1985	2,171	—
2006	2,567	+18.2%
2019	2,684	+4.6%
