= Wonrobogo =

- Country: Burkina Faso
- Region: Centre-Sud Region
- Province: Bazèga Province
- Department: Kombissiri Department

Population (2019)
  - Total: 551

Wonrobogo is a village in the Kombissiri Department of Bazèga Province in central Burkina Faso.

Population
Year	Pop.	±%
1985	402	—
2006	591	+47.0%
2019	551	−6.8%
