= Bissiri =

- Location in Burkina Faso
- Coordinates: 12°5′59″N 1°14′49″W
- Country: Burkina Faso
- Region: Centre-Sud Region
- Province: Bazèga Province
- Department: Kombissiri Department

Population (2019)
  - Total: 1,612

Bissiri is a town in the Kombissiri Department of Bazèga Province in central Burkina Faso.

Population
Year	Pop.	±%
1985	782	—
2006	1,154	+47.6%
2019	1,612	+39.7%
