= Goumsé =

- Location in Burkina Faso
- Coordinates: 11°48′N 1°17′W
- Country: Burkina Faso
- Region: Centre-Sud Region
- Province: Bazèga Province
- Department: Toece Department

Population (2019)
  - Total: 788

Goumsé is a village in the Toece Department of Bazèga Province in central Burkina Faso.

Population
Year	Pop.	±%
2006	713	—
2019	788	+10.5%
