= Koudiougou =

- Location in Burkina Faso
- Coordinates: 11°50′N 1°26′W
- Country: Burkina Faso
- Region: Centre-Sud Region
- Province: Bazèga Province
- Department: Kombissiri Department

Population (2019)
  - Total: 378

Koudiougou is a village in the Kombissiri Department of Bazèga Province in central Burkina Faso.

Population
Year	Pop.	±%
1985	146	—
2006	381	+161.0%
2019	378	−0.8%
