= Tambouè =

Tambouè Timboue
- Interactive map of Tambouè
- Coordinates: 11°46′46″N 1°18′40″W
- Country: Burkina Faso
- Region: Centre-Sud Region
- Province: Bazèga Province
- Department: Toece Department

Population (2019)
  - Total: 1,600

Tambouè is a town in the Toece Department of Bazèga Province in central Burkina Faso.

Population
Year	Pop.	±%
1985	1,011	—
2006	1,332	+31.8%
2019	1,600	+20.1%
