= Kactinga =

- Location in Burkina Faso
- Coordinates: 11°54′N 1°37′W
- Country: Burkina Faso
- Region: Centre-Sud Region
- Province: Bazèga Province
- Department: Ipelce Department

Population (2019)
  - Total: 301

Kactinga (or Kaktinga or Kackin) is a village in the Ipelce Department of Bazèga Province in central Burkina Faso.

Population
Year	Pop.	±%
2006	353	—
2019	301	−14.7%
