= Yanga, Burkina Faso =

Yanga
- Location in Burkina Faso
- Coordinates: 12°7′27″N 1°18′55″W
- Country: Burkina Faso
- Region: Centre-Sud Region
- Province: Bazèga Province
- Department: Doulougou Department

Population (2019)
  - Total: 1,107

Yanga is a village in the Doulougou Department of Bazèga Province in central Burkina Faso.

Population
Year	Pop.	±%
1985	624	—
2006	735	+17.8%
2019	1,107	+50.6%
