= Bissiga, Kombissiri =

Bissiga
- Location in Burkina Faso
- Coordinates: 12°4′13″N 1°18′0″W
- Country: Burkina Faso
- Region: Centre-Sud Region
- Province: Bazèga Province
- Department: Kombissiri Department

Population (2019)
  - Total: 503

Bissiga is a village in the Kombissiri Department of Bazèga Province in central Burkina Faso.

Population
Year	Pop.	±%
1985	343	—
2006	478	+39.4%
2019	503	+5.2%
