= Sancé, Bazèga =

Sancé
- Location in Burkina Faso
- Coordinates: 12°5′N 1°51′W
- Country: Burkina Faso
- Region: Centre-Sud Region
- Province: Bazèga Province
- Department: Kayao Department

Population (2019)
  - Total: 1,321

Sancé or Samse is a town in the Kayao Department of Bazèga Province in central Burkina Faso.

Population
| Year | Pop. | ±% |
|---|---|---|
| 1985 | 3,077 | — |
| 2006 | 1,297 | −57.8% |
| 2019 | 1,321 | +1.9% |
