= Tambili =

- Country: Burkina Faso
- Region: Centre-Sud Region
- Province: Bazèga Province
- Department: Gaongo Department

Population (2019)
  - Total: 498

Tambili is a village in the Gaongo Department of Bazèga Province in central Burkina Faso.

Population
Year	Pop.	±%
1985	314	—
2006	357	+13.7%
2019	498	+39.5%
