= Kaongho =

- Location in Burkina Faso
- Coordinates: 11°47′N 1°24′W
- Country: Burkina Faso
- Region: Centre-Sud Region
- Province: Bazèga Province
- Department: Toece Department

Population (2019)
  - Total: 751

Kaongho is a village in the Toece Department of Bazèga Province in central Burkina Faso.

Population
Year	Pop.	±%
1985	416	—
2006	591	+42.1%
2019	751	+27.1%
