= Borogo =

- Location in Burkina Faso
- Coordinates: 11°56′52″N 1°27′36″W
- Country: Burkina Faso
- Region: Centre-Sud Region
- Province: Bazèga Province
- Department: Doulougou Department

Population (2019)
  - Total: 717

Borogo is a village in the Doulougou Department of Bazèga Province in central Burkina Faso.

Population
Year	Pop.	±%
1985	453	—
2006	670	+47.9%
2019	717	+7.0%
