= Pissi, Kombissiri =

Pissi
- Location in Burkina Faso
- Coordinates: 12°3′31″N 1°17′58″W
- Country: Burkina Faso
- Region: Centre-Sud Region
- Province: Bazèga Province
- Department: Kombissiri Department

Population (2019)
  - Total: 1,219

Pissi is a village in the Kombissiri Department of Bazèga Province in central Burkina Faso.

Population
Year	Pop.	±%
1985	778	—
2006	1,009	+29.7%
2019	1,219	+20.8%
