= Koassa =

- Location in Burkina Faso
- Coordinates: 12°0′33″N 1°20′12″W
- Country: Burkina Faso
- Region: Centre-Sud Region
- Province: Bazèga Province
- Department: Kombissiri Department

Population (2019)
  - Total: 1,517

Koassa is a town in the Kombissiri Department of Bazèga Province in central Burkina Faso.

Population
Year	Pop.	±%
1985	1,298	—
2006	1,416	+9.1%
2019	1,517	+7.1%
