= Sondré =

- Location in Burkina Faso
- Coordinates: 12°7′14″N 1°55′4″W
- Country: Burkina Faso
- Region: Centre-Sud Region
- Province: Bazèga Province
- Department: Kayao Department

Population (2019)
  - Total: 1,007

Sondré is a village in the Kayao Department of Bazèga Province in central Burkina Faso.

Population
Year	Pop.	±%
2006	946	—
2019	1,007	+6.4%
