= Godin, Doulougou =

Godin
- Location in Burkina Faso
- Coordinates: 11°56′N 1°28′W
- Country: Burkina Faso
- Region: Centre-Sud Region
- Province: Bazèga Province
- Department: Doulougou Department

Population (2019)
  - Total: 449

Godin is a village in the Doulougou Department of Bazèga Province in central Burkina Faso.

Population
Year	Pop.	±%
1985	506	—
2006	576	+13.8%
2019	449	−22.0%
