= Yada, Burkina Faso =

Yada
- Location in Burkina Faso
- Coordinates: 12°1′N 1°59′W
- Country: Burkina Faso
- Region: Centre-Sud Region
- Province: Bazèga Province
- Department: Kayao Department

Population (2019)
  - Total: 1,390

Yada, Burkina Faso is a town in the Kayao Department of Bazèga Province in central Burkina Faso.

Population
Year	Pop.	±%
1985	3,101	—
2006	1,120	−63.9%
2019	1,390	+24.1%
