= Doundouni =

- Location in Burkina Faso
- Coordinates: 12°5′20″N 1°55′14″W
- Country: Burkina Faso
- Region: Centre-Sud Region
- Province: Bazèga Province
- Department: Kayao Department

Population (2019)
  - Total: 4,238

Doundouni is a town in the Kayao Department of Bazèga Province in central Burkina Faso.

Population
Year	Pop.	±%
1985	4,409	—
2006	4,285	−2.8%
2019	4,238	−1.1%
