= Sambin, Ipelce =

Sambin
- Location in Burkina Faso
- Coordinates: 11°53′N 1°38′W
- Country: Burkina Faso
- Region: Centre-Sud Region
- Province: Bazèga Province
- Department: Ipelce Department

Population (2019)
  - Total: 1,472

Sambin, Ipelce is a town in the Ipelce Department of Bazèga Province in central Burkina Faso.

Population
Year	Pop.	±%
1985	1,356	—
2006	1,409	+3.9%
2019	1,472	+4.5%
