= Damzoussi =

Damzoussi may refer to:

- Damzoussi, Saponé
- Damzoussi, Toece
