= Kossilci =

Coordinates: 12°08′N 1°56′W

Kossilci Kossilsi
- Interactive map of Kossilci
- Country: Burkina Faso
- Region: Centre-Sud Region
- Province: Bazèga Province
- Department: Kayao Department

Population (2019)
  - Total: 2,797

Kossilci is a town in the Kayao Department of Bazèga Province in central Burkina Faso.

Population
Year	Pop.	±%
1985	1,532	—
2006	2,402	+56.8%
2019	2,797	+16.4%
