= Kagamzincé =

- Location in Burkina Faso
- Coordinates: 12°6′22″N 1°20′46″W
- Country: Burkina Faso
- Region: Centre-Sud Region
- Province: Bazèga Province
- Department: Doulougou Department

Population (2019)
  - Total: 1,702

Kagamzincé (or Kagamzensé) is a village in the Doulougou Department of Bazèga Province in central Burkina Faso.

Population
Year	Pop.	±%
1985	676	—
2006	1,066	+57.7%
2019	1,702	+59.7%
