= Sincéné =

Sincéné may refer to:

- Sincéné, Doulougou
- Sincéné, Toece
