= Yallo-Gouroungou =

- Location in Burkina Faso
- Coordinates: 11°57′N 1°55′W
- Country: Burkina Faso
- Region: Centre-Sud Region
- Province: Bazèga Province
- Department: Kayao Department

Population (2019)
  - Total: 2,213

Yallo-Gouroungou or Yalou-Gouroungou is a town in the Kayao Department of Bazèga Province in central Burkina Faso.

Population
Year	Pop.	±%
1985	1,774	—
2006	1,744	−1.7%
2019	2,213	+26.9%
