= Sandeba =

- Country: Burkina Faso
- Region: Centre-Sud Region
- Province: Bazèga Province
- Department: Ipelce Department

Population (2019)
  - Total: 1,135

Sandeba is a village in the Ipelce Department of Bazèga Province in central Burkina Faso.

Population
Year	Pop.	±%
1985	631	—
2006	909	+44.1%
2019	1,135	+24.9%
