= Silemba =

Silemba Silimba
- Country: Burkina Faso
- Region: Centre-Sud Region
- Province: Bazèga Province
- Department: Doulougou Department

Population (2019)
  - Total: 827

Silemba is a village in the Doulougou Department of Bazèga Province in central Burkina Faso.

Population
Year	Pop.	±%
1985	395	—
2006	662	+67.6%
2019	827	+24.9%
