= Kilou, Bazèga =

Kilou Killou
- Country: Burkina Faso
- Region: Centre-Sud Region
- Province: Bazèga Province
- Department: Kayao Department

Population (2019)
  - Total: 2,516

Kilou is a town in the Kayao Department of Bazèga Province in central Burkina Faso.

Population
Year	Pop.	±%
1985		—
2006	1,565	—
2019	2,516	+60.8%
