= Bélégré =

- Location in Burkina Faso
- Coordinates: 12°2′10″N 1°22′25″W
- Country: Burkina Faso
- Region: Centre-Sud Region
- Province: Bazèga Province
- Department: Doulougou Department

Population (2019)
  - Total: 1,373

Bélégré is a town in the Doulougou Department of Bazèga Province in central Burkina Faso.

Population
Year	Pop.	±%
1985	617	—
2006	1,094	+77.3%
2019	1,373	+25.5%
