= Dassamkandé =

- Location in Burkina Faso
- Coordinates: 12°3′7″N 1°13′3″W
- Country: Burkina Faso
- Region: Centre-Sud Region
- Province: Bazèga Province
- Department: Gaongo Department

Population (2019)
  - Total: 1,500

Dassamkandé is a town in the Gaongo Department of Bazèga Province in central Burkina Faso.

Population
Year	Pop.	±%
1985	634	—
2006	1,308	+106.3%
2019	1,500	+14.7%
