= Samsaongo =

Samsaongo Samsaogo
- Location in Burkina Faso
- Coordinates: 11°53′N 1°31′W
- Country: Burkina Faso
- Region: Centre-Sud Region
- Province: Bazèga Province
- Department: Doulougou Department

Population (2019)
  - Total: 788

Samsaongo is a village in the Doulougou Department of Bazèga Province in central Burkina Faso.

Population
Year	Pop.	±%
1985	829	—
2006	650	−21.6%
2019	788	+21.2%
