= Yougritenga =

- Location in Burkina Faso
- Coordinates: 12°0′18″N 1°25′6″W
- Country: Burkina Faso
- Region: Centre-Sud Region
- Province: Bazèga Province
- Department: Doulougou Department

Population (2019)
  - Total: 561

Yougritenga is a village in the Doulougou Department of Bazèga Province in central Burkina Faso.

Population
Year	Pop.	±%
1985	475	—
2006	492	+3.6%
2019	561	+14.0%
