= Karangtanghin =

Karangtanghin Karaktanguen
- Location in Burkina Faso
- Coordinates: 12°9′8″N 1°29′26″W
- Country: Burkina Faso
- Region: Centre-Sud Region
- Province: Bazèga Province
- Department: Saponé Department

Population (2019)
  - Total: 658

Karangtanghin is a village in the Saponé Department of Bazèga Province in central Burkina Faso.

Population
Year	Pop.	±%
1985	454	—
2006	439	−3.3%
2019	658	+49.9%
