= Singdin =

Coordinates: 12°01′N 1°58′W

- Interactive map of Singdin
- Country: Burkina Faso
- Region: Centre-Sud Region
- Province: Bazèga Province
- Department: Kayao Department

Population (2019)
  - Total: 2,561

Singdin is a town in the Kayao Department of Bazèga Province in central Burkina Faso.

Population
Year	Pop.	±%
1985	1,492	—
2006	2,118	+42.0%
2019	2,561	+20.9%
