= Wardogo =

- Location in Burkina Faso
- Coordinates: 12°1′54″N 1°0′20″W
- Country: Burkina Faso
- Region: Centre-Sud Region
- Province: Bazèga Province
- Department: Gaongo Department

Population (2019)
  - Total: 8,542

Wardogo is a town in the Gaongo Department of Bazèga Province in central Burkina Faso.

Population
Year	Pop.	±%
1985	1,682	—
2006	5,182	+208.1%
2019	8,542	+64.8%
