= Nabinskiema =

Nabinskiema Nabinkiesma
- Country: Burkina Faso
- Region: Centre-Sud Region
- Province: Bazèga Province
- Department: Doulougou Department

Population (2019)
  - Total: 960

Nabinskiema is a village in the Doulougou Department of Bazèga Province in central Burkina Faso.

Population
Year	Pop.	±%
1985	871	—
2006	837	−3.9%
2019	960	+14.7%
