= Damzoussi, Toece =

Damzoussi
- Location in Burkina Faso
- Coordinates: 11°54′N 1°19′W
- Country: Burkina Faso
- Region: Centre-Sud Region
- Province: Bazèga Province
- Department: Toece Department

Population (2019)
  - Total: 1,040

Damzoussi is a village in the Toece Department of Bazèga Province in central Burkina Faso.

Population
Year	Pop.	±%
1985	748	—
2006	934	+24.9%
2019	1,040	+11.3%
