= Douré, Doulougou =

Douré
- Country: Burkina Faso
- Region: Centre-Sud Region
- Province: Bazèga Province
- Department: Doulougou Department

Population (2019)
  - Total: 739

Douré, Doulougou is a village in the Doulougou Department of Bazèga Province in central Burkina Faso.

Population
Year	Pop.	±%
1985	518	—
2006	629	+21.4%
2019	739	+17.5%
