= Nafbanga =

Nafbanga Naf Banka
- Location in Burkina Faso
- Coordinates: 12°9′54″N 1°5′59″W
- Country: Burkina Faso
- Region: Centre-Sud Region
- Province: Bazèga Province
- Department: Gaongo Department

Population (2019)
  - Total: 7,687

Nafbanga is a town in the Gaongo Department of Bazèga Province in central Burkina Faso.

Population
Year	Pop.	±%
1985	2,814	—
2006	6,066	+115.6%
2019	7,687	+26.7%
