= Guidissi =

- Interactive map of Guidissi
- Country: Burkina Faso
- Region: Centre-Sud Region
- Province: Bazèga Province
- Department: Doulougou Department

Population (2019)
  - Total: 499

Guidissi is a village in the Doulougou Department of Bazèga Province in central Burkina Faso.

Population
Year	Pop.	±%
1985	477	—
2006	553	+15.9%
2019	499	−9.8%
