= Rellou =

- Country: Burkina Faso
- Region: Centre-Sud Region
- Province: Bazèga Province
- Department: Kayao Department

Population (2019)
  - Total: 1,319

Rellou is a town in the Kayao Department of Bazèga Province in central Burkina Faso.

Population
| Year | Pop. | ±% |
|---|---|---|
| 2006 | 891 | — |
| 2019 | 1,319 | +48.0% |
