= Yargo, Kombissiri =

Yargo
- Interactive map of Yargo
- Coordinates: 11°57′08″N 1°18′43″W
- Country: Burkina Faso
- Region: Centre-Sud Region
- Province: Bazèga Province
- Department: Kombissiri Department

Population (2019)
  - Total: 897

Yargo is a village in the Kombissiri Department of Bazèga Province in central Burkina Faso.

Population
Year	Pop.	±%
1985	1,095	—
2006	931	−15.0%
2019	897	−3.7%
