= Yargo, Toece =

Yargo
- Location in Burkina Faso
- Coordinates: 11°49′N 1°17′W
- Country: Burkina Faso
- Region: Centre-Sud Region
- Province: Bazèga Province
- Department: Toece Department

Population (2019)
  - Total: 1,241

Yargo is a town in the Toece Department of Bazèga Province in central Burkina Faso.

Population
Year	Pop.	±%
1985	388	—
2006	1,187	+205.9%
2019	1,241	+4.5%
