= Dabogtinga =

Dabotinga
- Location in Burkina Faso
- Coordinates: 11°53′N 1°32′W
- Country: Burkina Faso
- Region: Centre-Sud Region
- Province: Bazèga Province
- Department: Doulougou Department

Population (2019)
  - Total: 1,180

Dabogtinga is a town in the Doulougou Department of Bazèga Province in central Burkina Faso.

Population
Year	Pop.	±%
1985	644	—
2006	1,058	+64.3%
2019	1,180	+11.5%
