= Dayasmnoré =

- Location within Burkina Faso
- Country: Burkina Faso
- Region: Centre-Sud Region
- Province: Bazèga Province
- Department: Toece Department

Population (2019)
  - Total: 785

Dayasmnoré is a village in the Toece Department of Bazèga Province in central Burkina Faso. The village has a population of 641.

Population
Year	Pop.	±%
1985	520	—
2006	504	−3.1%
2019	785	+55.8%
