= Zinguedeghin =

Zinguedeghin Zinguedeguin
- Country: Burkina Faso
- Region: Centre-Sud Region
- Province: Bazèga Province
- Department: Ipelce Department

Population (2019)
  - Total: 720

Zinguedeghin is a village in the Ipelce Department of Bazèga Province in central Burkina Faso.

Population
Year	Pop.	±%
1985	927	—
2006	805	−13.2%
2019	720	−10.6%
