= Guidgrétinga =

- Location in Burkina Faso
- Coordinates: 11°59′N 1°26′W
- Country: Burkina Faso
- Region: Centre-Sud Region
- Province: Bazèga Province
- Department: Doulougou Department

Population (2019)
  - Total: 366

Guidgrétinga is a village in the Doulougou Department of Bazèga Province in central Burkina Faso.

Population
| Year | Pop. | ±% |
|---|---|---|
| 1985 | 244 | — |
| 2006 | 368 | +50.8% |
| 2019 | 366 | −0.5% |
