= Nacombogo =

Nacombogo may refer to places in Burkina Faso:

- Nacombogo, Ipelce
- Nacombogo, Toece
