= Wattinoma, Bazèga =

Wattinoma
- Country: Burkina Faso
- Region: Centre-Sud Region
- Province: Bazèga Province
- Department: Doulougou Department

Population (2019)
  - Total: 497

Wattinoma, Bazèga is a village in the Doulougou Department of Bazèga Province in central Burkina Faso.

Population
Year	Pop.	±%
1985	506	—
2006	293	−42.1%
2019	497	+69.6%
