= Douaba =

- Location in Burkina Faso
- Coordinates: 11°58′N 1°12′W
- Country: Burkina Faso
- Region: Centre-Sud Region
- Province: Bazèga Province
- Department: Gaongo Department

Population (2019)
  - Total: 1,405

Douaba is a town in the Gaongo Department of Bazèga Province in central Burkina Faso.

Population
Year	Pop.	±%
1985	1,112	—
2006	985	−11.4%
2019	1,405	+42.6%
