= Dapoury =

- Location in Burkina Faso
- Coordinates: 12°3′N 1°50′W
- Country: Burkina Faso
- Region: Centre-Sud Region
- Province: Bazèga Province
- Department: Kayao Department

Population (2019)
  - Total: 1,461

Dapoury is a town in the Kayao Department of Bazèga Province in central Burkina Faso.

Population
Year	Pop.	±%
1985	2,059	—
2006	1,382	−32.9%
2019	1,461	+5.7%
