= Koukoulou =

Coordinates: 12°06′N 1°51′W

- Interactive map of Koukoulou
- Country: Burkina Faso
- Region: Centre-Sud Region
- Province: Bazèga Province
- Department: Kayao Department

Population (2019)
  - Total: 1,529

Koukoulou is a town in the Kayao Department of Bazèga Province in central Burkina Faso.

Population
Year	Pop.	±%
2006	1,757	—
2019	1,529	−13.0%
