= Gana, Burkina Faso =

Gana
- Location in Burkina Faso
- Coordinates: 12°3′26″N 1°24′1″W
- Country: Burkina Faso
- Region: Centre-Sud Region
- Province: Bazèga Province
- Department: Doulougou Department

Population (2019)
  - Total: 1,667

Gana, Burkina Faso is a town in the Doulougou Department of Bazèga Province in central Burkina Faso.

Population
Year	Pop.	±%
1985	1,479	—
2006	1,783	+20.6%
2019	1,667	−6.5%
