= Kombougo =

- Country: Burkina Faso
- Region: Centre-Sud Region
- Province: Bazèga Province
- Department: Gaongo Department

Population (2019)
  - Total: 1,299

Kombougo is a town in the Gaongo Department of Bazèga Province in central Burkina Faso.

Population
Year	Pop.	±%
1985	1,121	—
2006	1,438	+28.3%
2019	1,299	−9.7%
