= Pibsé =

- Location in Burkina Faso
- Coordinates: 12°2′0″N 1°23′4″W
- Country: Burkina Faso
- Region: Centre-Sud Region
- Province: Bazèga Province
- Department: Doulougou Department

Population (2019)
  - Total: 1,548

Pibsé is a town in the Doulougou Department of Bazèga Province in central Burkina Faso.

Population
Year	Pop.	±%
1985	907	—
2006	1,289	+42.1%
2019	1,548	+20.1%
