= Pissi, Saponé =

Pissi
- Location in Burkina Faso
- Coordinates: 12°4′24″N 1°28′54″W
- Country: Burkina Faso
- Region: Centre-Sud Region
- Province: Bazèga Province
- Department: Saponé Department

Population (2019)
  - Total: 2,123

Pissi, Saponé is a town in the Saponé Department of Bazèga Province in central Burkina Faso.

Population
Year	Pop.	±%
1985	1,752	—
2006	2,023	+15.5%
2019	2,123	+4.9%
