= Widi =

- Location in Burkina Faso
- Coordinates: 11°56′N 1°35′W
- Country: Burkina Faso
- Region: Centre-Sud Region
- Province: Bazèga Province
- Department: Doulougou Department

Population (2019)
  - Total: 1,237

Widi is a village in the Doulougou Department of Bazèga Province in central Burkina Faso.

Population
Year	Pop.	±%
1985	477	—
2006	983	+106.1%
2019	1,237	+25.8%
