= Sagabtinga-Yarcé =

- Location in Burkina Faso
- Coordinates: 11°51′N 1°37′W
- Country: Burkina Faso
- Region: Centre-Sud Region
- Province: Bazèga Province
- Department: Ipelce Department

Population (2019)
  - Total: 2,429

Sagabtinga-Yarcé is a town in the Ipelce Department of Bazèga Province in central Burkina Faso.

Population
Year	Pop.	±%
1985	1,669	—
2006	2,416	+44.8%
2019	2,429	+0.5%
