= Sampogrétinga =

- Location in Burkina Faso
- Coordinates: 12°0′32″N 1°26′54″W
- Country: Burkina Faso
- Region: Centre-Sud Region
- Province: Bazèga Province
- Department: Doulougou Department

Population (2019)
  - Total: 617

Sampogrétinga is a village in the Doulougou Department of Bazèga Province in central Burkina Faso.

Population
Year	Pop.	±%
1985	501	—
2006	585	+16.8%
2019	617	+5.5%
