= Kinkirou =

- Country: Burkina Faso
- Region: Centre-Sud Region
- Province: Bazèga Province
- Department: Kayao Department

Population (2019)
  - Total: 891

Kinkirou is a village in the Kayao Department of Bazèga Province in central Burkina Faso.

Population
Year	Pop.	±%
2006	710	—
2019	891	+25.5%
