= Banghingo =

Banghingo Banghingogo
- Country: Burkina Faso
- Region: Centre-Sud Region
- Province: Bazèga Province
- Department: Ipelce Department

Population (2019)
  - Total: 770

Banghingo is a village in the Ipelce Department of Bazèga Province in central Burkina Faso.

Population
Year	Pop.	±%
1985	364	—
2006	690	+89.6%
2019	770	+11.6%
