= Siltougdo =

- Country: Burkina Faso
- Region: Centre-Sud Region
- Province: Bazèga Province
- Department: Ipelce Department

Population (2019)
  - Total: 468

Siltougdo is a village located in the Ipelce Department of Bazèga Province in central Burkina Faso.

Population
Year	Pop.	±%
1985	616	—
2006	414	−32.8%
2019	468	+13.0%
