= Vossé =

- Location in Burkina Faso
- Coordinates: 12°5′35″N 1°2′4″W
- Country: Burkina Faso
- Region: Centre-Sud Region
- Province: Bazèga Province
- Department: Gaongo Department

Population (2019)
  - Total: 3,707

Vossé is a town in the Gaongo Department of Bazèga Province in central Burkina Faso.

Population
Year	Pop.	±%
1985	1,651	—
2006	3,004	+82.0%
2019	3,707	+23.4%
