= Gomasgo =

- Country: Burkina Faso
- Region: Centre-Sud Region
- Province: Bazèga Province
- Department: Gaongo Department

Population (2019)
  - Total: 1,677

Gomasgo is a village in the Gaongo Department of Bazèga Province in central Burkina Faso.

Population
Year	Pop.	±%
2006	736	—
2019	1,677	+127.9%
