= Goumsin =

Coordinates: 12°00′N 1°49′W

- Interactive map of Goumsin
- Country: Burkina Faso
- Region: Centre-Sud Region
- Province: Bazèga Province
- Department: Kayao Department

Population (2019)
  - Total: 2,414

Goumsin is a town in the Kayao Department of Bazèga Province in central Burkina Faso.

Within the framework of the Foyer Social Educatif du lycée Théodore Deck de Guebwiller, the educational college in partnership with the Aide au Développement has worked with young students in the town to develop educationally.

Population
Year	Pop.	±%
2006	2,089	—
2019	2,414	+15.6%
