= Nacombogo, Toece =

Nacombogo
- Location in Burkina Faso
- Coordinates: 11°51′N 1°19′W
- Country: Burkina Faso
- Region: Centre-Sud Region
- Province: Bazèga Province
- Department: Toece Department

Population (2019)
  - Total: 220

Nacombogo is a village in the Toece Department of Bazèga Province in central Burkina Faso.

Population
Year	Pop.	±%
1985	256	—
2006	339	+32.4%
2019	220	−35.1%
