= Goumsa =

- Location in Burkina Faso
- Coordinates: 12°3′22″N 1°51′47″W
- Country: Burkina Faso
- Region: Centre-Sud Region
- Province: Bazèga Province
- Department: Kayao Department

Population (2019)
  - Total: 537

Goumsa is a village in the Kayao Department of Bazèga Province in central Burkina Faso.

Population
Year	Pop.	±%
2006	506	—
2019	537	+6.1%
