= Ilyalla =

- Region: Centre-Sud Region
- Province: Bazèga Province
- Department: Kayao Department

Population (2019)
  - Total: 1,038

Ilyalla is a town in the Kayao Department of Bazèga Province in central Burkina Faso.

Population
Year	Pop.	±%
1985	2,010	—
2006	830	−58.7%
2019	1,038	+25.1%
