= Seloghin =

- Location in Burkina Faso
- Coordinates: 12°1′16″N 1°26′13″W
- Country: Burkina Faso
- Region: Centre-Sud Region
- Province: Bazèga Province
- Department: Doulougou Department

Population (2019)
  - Total: 449

Seloghin or Seloguen is a village in the Doulougou Department of Bazèga Province in central Burkina Faso.

Population
Year	Pop.	±%
1985	385	—
2006	403	+4.7%
2019	449	+11.4%
