= Toébanéga =

- Location in Burkina Faso
- Coordinates: 11°51′N 1°29′W
- Country: Burkina Faso
- Region: Centre-Sud Region
- Province: Bazèga Province
- Department: Doulougou Department

Population (2019)
  - Total: 768

Toébanéga is a village in the Doulougou Department of Bazèga Province in central Burkina Faso.

Population
Year	Pop.	±%
1985	441	—
2006	605	+37.2%
2019	768	+26.9%
