= Damzoussi, Saponé =

Damzoussi
- Location in Burkina Faso
- Coordinates: 12°4′27″N 1°32′38″W
- Country: Burkina Faso
- Region: Centre-Sud Region
- Province: Bazèga Province
- Department: Saponé Department

Population (2019)
  - Total: 759

Damzoussi is a village in the Saponé Department of Bazèga Province in central Burkina Faso.

Population
Year	Pop.	±%
1985	664	—
2006	717	+8.0%
2019	759	+5.9%
