= Lado, Burkina Faso =

Lado
- Location in Burkina Faso
- Coordinates: 11°58′N 1°44′W
- Country: Burkina Faso
- Region: Centre-Sud Region
- Province: Bazèga Province
- Department: Kayao Department

Population (2019)
  - Total: 1,452

Lado is a town in the Kayao Department of Bazèga Province in central Burkina Faso.

Population
Year	Pop.	±%
2006	1,161	—
2019	1,452	+25.1%
