= Neblaboumbou =

- Country: Burkina Faso
- Region: Centre-Sud Region
- Province: Bazèga Province
- Department: Gaongo Department

Population (2019)
  - Total: 2,537

Neblaboumbou is a town in the Gaongo Department of Bazèga Province in central Burkina Faso.

Population
Year	Pop.	±%
2006	1,730	—
2019	2,537	+46.6%
