= Guisma =

- Country: Burkina Faso
- Region: Centre-Sud Region
- Province: Bazèga Province
- Department: Ipelce Department

Population (2019)
  - Total: 353

Guisma is a village in the Ipelce Department of Bazèga Province in central Burkina Faso.

Population
Year	Pop.	±%
2006	324	—
2019	353	+9.0%
