= Yéaoanga =

- Country: Burkina Faso
- Region: Centre-Sud Region
- Province: Bazèga Province
- Department: Kayao Department

Population (2019)
  - Total: 2,974

Yéaoanga or Yazouanga is a town in the Kayao Department of Bazèga Province in central Burkina Faso.

Population
Year	Pop.	±%
2006	1,983	—
2019	2,974	+50.0%
