= Sarana, Bazèga =

Sarana
- Country: Burkina Faso
- Region: Centre-Sud Region
- Province: Bazèga Province
- Department: Doulougou Department

Population (2019)
  - Total: 679

Sarana is a village in the Doulougou Department of Bazèga Province in central Burkina Faso.

Population
Year	Pop.	±%
1985	633	—
2006	566	−10.6%
2019	679	+20.0%
