= Binstigré =

- Location in Burkina Faso
- Coordinates: 11°47′N 1°22′W
- Country: Burkina Faso
- Region: Centre-Sud Region
- Province: Bazèga Province
- Department: Toece Department

Population (2019)
  - Total: 1,187

Binstigré is a town in the Toece Department of Bazèga Province in central Burkina Faso.

Population
Year	Pop.	±%
1985	865	—
2006	895	+3.5%
2019	1,187	+32.6%
