= Bandéla =

- Country: Burkina Faso
- Region: Centre-Sud Region
- Province: Bazèga Province
- Department: Ipelce Department

Population (2019)
  - Total: 662

Bandéla is a village in the Ipelce Department of Bazèga Province in central Burkina Faso.

Population
Year	Pop.	±%
2006	623	—
2019	662	+6.3%
