= Yellou =

Yellou Yelou Lado
- Interactive map of Yellou
- Coordinates: 12.0426861°N 1.6976693°W
- Country: Burkina Faso
- Region: Centre-Sud Region
- Province: Bazèga Province
- Department: Kayao Department

Population (2019)
  - Total: 807

Yellou or Yelou is a village in the Kayao Department of Bazèga Province in central Burkina Faso. It is the birthplace of former president of Niger Daouda Malam Wanké.

Population
Year	Pop.	±%
1985	1,507	—
2006	683	−54.7%
2019	807	+18.2%
