= Sincéné, Toece =

Sincéné
- Location in Burkina Faso
- Coordinates: 11°55′N 1°13′W
- Country: Burkina Faso
- Region: Centre-Sud Region
- Province: Bazèga Province
- Department: Toece Department

Population (2019)
  - Total: 878

Sincéné is a village in the Toece Department of Bazèga Province in central Burkina Faso.

Population
Year	Pop.	±%
1985	514	—
2006	821	+59.7%
2019	878	+6.9%
