= Kombous-Youngo =

- Location in Burkina Faso
- Coordinates: 12°5′N 1°24′W
- Country: Burkina Faso
- Region: Centre-Sud Region
- Province: Bazèga Province
- Department: Doulougou Department

Population (2019)
  - Total: 130

Kombous-Youngo is a village in the Doulougou Department of Bazèga Province in central Burkina Faso.

Population
Year	Pop.	±%
1985	84	—
2006	99	+17.9%
2019	130	+31.3%
