= Soulli =

- Location in Burkina Faso
- Coordinates: 11°55′N 1°31′W
- Country: Burkina Faso
- Region: Centre-Sud Region
- Province: Bazèga Province
- Department: Doulougou Department

Population (2019)
  - Total: 1,105

Soulli is a village in the Doulougou Department of Bazèga Province in central Burkina Faso, West Africa.

Population
Year	Pop.	±%
1985	1,163	—
2006	1,228	+5.6%
2019	1,105	−10.0%
