= Bissiga, Saponé =

Bissiga
- Location in Burkina Faso
- Coordinates: 12°2′11″N 1°28′14″W
- Country: Burkina Faso
- Region: Centre-Sud Region
- Province: Bazèga Province
- Department: Saponé Department

Population (2019)
  - Total: 802

Bissiga is a village in the Saponé Department of Bazèga Province in central Burkina Faso.

Population
Year	Pop.	±%
1985	922	—
2006	837	−9.2%
2019	802	−4.2%
