= Apollinaire Compaoré =

Burkinabè businessman (1953–2026)

- Born: Apollinaire Timpiga Compaoré; 19 July 1953; Koassa, French Upper Volta, French West Africa
- Died: 14 May 2026 (aged 72)
- Occupation: Businessman

Apollinaire Timpiga Compaoré (19 July 1953 – 14 May 2026) was a Burkinabè businessman.

== Life and career ==
Born in Koassa on 19 July 1953, Compaoré grew up in a peasant family and became a venture capitalist, selling lottery tickets before venturing into resale and wholesale. In 2004, he founded Planor Afrique, a multisector conglomerate. The group held 15 subsidiaries across West Africa, including Wendkuni Bank International, Telecel Faso, UAB Assurances, Burkina Moto, Faso Crédit, Burkina Transport, SKI, Sodicom, SBE, Garage Madeleine, ATEL (Telecel Mali), and NAFA Logistics. In June 2023, he launched FASO Créduit, a microfinance institution. He also held minor stakes in other companies in West Africa, such as SONAR and MTN Côte d'Ivoire. Until 2018, he served as chair of the Conseil national du patronat burkinabé. In 2024, Telecel Faso launched Mobile Money, a service for fast and secure financial transactions, positioning itself as a competitor to the major French and Moroccan telecom giants.

According to the Organized Crime and Corruption Reporting Project, Compaoré was complicit in several scandals, including smuggling cigarettes and attempting to bribe a Malian government official.

Compaoré died on 14 May 2026, at the age of 72.
