= Toghin =

Toghin may refer to:

- Toghin, Bazèga
- Toghin, Boulgou
- Toghin, Ganzourgou
