= Nacombogo, Ipelce =

Nacombogo
- Location in Burkina Faso
- Coordinates: 11°57′N 1°33′W
- Country: Burkina Faso
- Region: Centre-Sud Region
- Province: Bazèga Province
- Department: Ipelce Department

Population (2019)
  - Total: 1,073

Nacombogo is a town in the Ipelce Department of Bazèga Province in central Burkina Faso.

Population
Year	Pop.	±%
1985	773	—
2006	1,085	+40.4%
2019	1,073	−1.1%
