= Bonogo =

- Location in Burkina Faso
- Coordinates: 12°4′1″N 1°35′2″W
- Country: Burkina Faso
- Region: Centre-Sud Region
- Province: Bazèga Province
- Department: Saponé Department

Population (2019)
  - Total: 1,450

Bonogo is a town in the Saponé Department of Bazèga Province in central Burkina Faso.

Population
Year	Pop.	±%
1985	2,255	—
2006	1,622	−28.1%
2019	1,450	−10.6%
