= Poa, Bazèga =

Poa
- Country: Burkina Faso
- Region: Centre-Sud Region
- Province: Bazèga Province
- Department: Kayao Department

Population (2019)
  - Total: 959

Poa is a village in the Kayao Department of Bazèga Province in central Burkina Faso.

Population
Year	Pop.	±%
2006	787	—
2019	959	+21.9%
