= Rakaye Yarcé =

- Country: Burkina Faso
- Region: Centre-Sud Region
- Province: Bazèga Province
- Department: Doulougou Department

Population (2019)
  - Total: 1,142

Rakaye Yarcé is a town in the Doulougou Department of Bazèga Province in central Burkina Faso.

Population
Year	Pop.	±%
1985	1,279	—
2006	1,150	−10.1%
2019	1,142	−0.7%
