= Ipelcé =

Ipelce
- Location in Burkina Faso
- Coordinates: 11°57′36″N 1°32′42″W
- Country: Burkina Faso
- Region: Centre-Sud Region
- Province: Bazèga Province
- Department: Ipelce Department

Population (2019)
  - Total: 2,891

Ipelce is the capital of the Ipelce Department of Bazèga Province in central Burkina Faso.

Population
Year	Pop.	±%
1985	1,201	—
2006	2,221	+84.9%
2019	2,891	+30.2%
