= Somassi =

Somassi may refer to:

- Somassi, Bazèga, Burkina Faso
- Somassi, Boulkiemdé, Burkina Faso
