= Yargo =

Yargo may refer to:

- Yargo, Burkina Faso, several villages
- Yargo Department, Burkina Faso
- Yargo (novel), a novel by Jacqueline Susann
- Yargo (band), 1980s Mancunian rock band
