= Nabdogo, Doulougou =

Nabdogo
- Location in Burkina Faso
- Coordinates: 11°58′N 1°28′W
- Country: Burkina Faso
- Region: Centre-Sud Region
- Province: Bazèga Province
- Department: Doulougou Department

Population (2019)
  - Total: 329

Nabdogo is a village in the Doulougou Department of Bazèga Province in central Burkina Faso.

Population
Year	Pop.	±%
1985	486	—
2006	422	−13.2%
2019	329	−22.0%
