= Poédogo, Kombissiri =

Poédogo
- Country: Burkina Faso
- Region: Centre-Sud Region
- Province: Bazèga Province
- Department: Kombissiri Department

Population (2019)
  - Total: 736

Poédogo is a village in the Kombissiri Department of Bazèga Province in central Burkina Faso.

Population
Year	Pop.	±%
1985	772	—
2006	711	−7.9%
2019	736	+3.5%
