= Peno =

Peno may refer to:

- Ron Peno (1955–2023), Australian rock singer
- Peno, a locality in Lamont County, Alberta, Canada
- Peno, Burkina Faso, a locality in Burkina Faso not far from the town of Zangogho
- Peno, Russia, an urban locality (an urban-type settlement) in Penovsky District of Tver Oblast, Russia
- Lake Peno, a lake in the Valdai Hills, Russia
- Stefan Peno (born 1997), Serbian basketball player
- PENO, a plastic explosive made by Finnish Forcit
