= Poédogo, Bazèga =

Poédogo, Bazèga may refer to:

- Poédogo, Doulougou
- Poédogo, Kombissiri
