= Loumbila Department =

Coordinates: 12°31′09″N 1°22′14″W

Loumbila
- Department
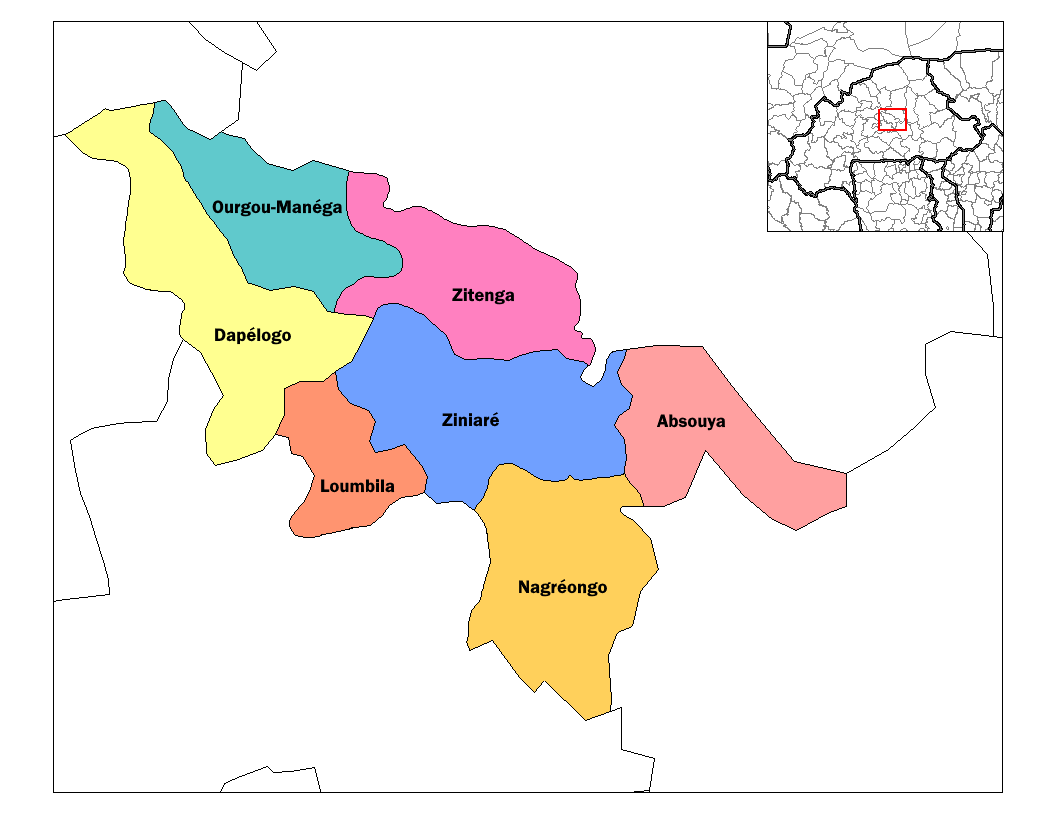
- Loumbila Department location in the province
- Country: Burkina Faso
- Province: Oubritenga Province

Area
  - Total: 68.3 sq mi (177.0 km^{2})

Population (2019)
  - Total: 36,465
  - Density: 533.6/sq mi (206.0/km^{2})
- Time zone: UTC+0 (GMT 0)

Loumbila is a department or commune of Oubritenga Province in northern-central Burkina Faso. Its capital lies at the town of Loumbila. According to the 2019 census the department has a total population of 36,465.

== Towns and villages ==
- Loumbila (1 596 inhabitants) (capital)
- Bangrin (1 121 inhabitants)
- Bendogo (397 inhabitants)
- Daguilma (854 inhabitants)
- Donsin (806 inhabitants)
- Dogomnogo (1 351 inhabitants)
- Gandin (599 inhabitants)
- Goué (1 878 inhabitants)
- Goundry (652 inhabitants)
- Ipala (394 inhabitants)
- Kogninga (410 inhabitants)
- Koulsinga (98 inhabitants)
- Kouriyaoghin (753 inhabitants)
- Nabdogo (531 inhabitants)
- Nangtenga (245 inhabitants)
- Nonguestenga (405 inhabitants)
- Nomgana (1 816 inhabitants)
- Noungou (1 044 inhabitants)
- Pendissi (744 inhabitants)
- Pendogo (207 inhabitants)
- Poédogo I (1 748 inhabitants)
- Poédogo II (377 inhabitants)
- Pousghin (2 180 inhabitants)
- Ramitenga (390 inhabitants)
- Silmiougou (1 900 inhabitants)
- Tabtenga (1 556 inhabitants)
- Tangzougou (724 inhabitants)
- Tanlaorgo (238 inhabitants)
- Wavoussé (788 inhabitants)
- Zongo (566 inhabitants)
