= Yarse =

The Yarse, also spelt Yarsé, Yarsin or Yarcin, are a people of Burkina Faso, living among the Mossi. The population in the mid-1990s was estimated at 190,000, of whom 90% were Muslims.

They are the descendants of Mandinka traders who arrived in the area in the late 1600s, bringing Islam. In 1780, they were granted permission by the Mossi king to settle throughout his kingdom; over the years, they adopted the language and customs of the Mossi and intermarried with them, but they did not convert either to Christianity or the indigenous Mossi religion, remaining faithful to Islam. Settlements in which the Yarse stayed included Kaya, Rakaye, Patenga and, later in the 18th century, Ouagadougou, where they had their own quarter. They continue to be merchants, although many have settled down to become subsistence millet farmers.

== Bibliography ==
- Duperray, Anne-Marie. "Les Yarsé du royaume de Ouagadougou: L’écrit et l’oral," Cahiers d’Etudes Africaines 25 (1985): 179–212.
- Izard, Michel. "Les Yarsé et le commerce dans le Yatênga pré-colonial," in The Development of Indigenous Trade and Markets in West Africa: Studies Presented and Discussed at the Tenth International African Seminar at Fourah Bay College, Freetown, December 1969, ed. Claude Meillassoux, pp. 214–227. London: Oxford University Press for the International African Institute, 1971, ISBN 9780197241868.
- Kouanda, Assimi. "Le religion musulmane: Facteur d’intégration ou d’identification ethnique: Le cas des Yarse du Burkina Faso," in Les ethnies ont une histoire, ed. Jean-Pierre Chrétien and Gérard Prunier, pp. 125–134. Paris: Karthala and ACCT, 1989, ISBN 9782865372263
