= Poa, Burkina Faso =

Poa, Burkina Faso may refer to:

- Poa, Bazèga, Burkina Faso
- Poa, Boulkiemdé, Burkina Faso
