= Toghin, Bazèga =

Toghin
- Country: Burkina Faso
- Region: Centre-Sud Region
- Province: Bazèga Province
- Department: Doulougou Department

Population (2019)
  - Total: 1,046

Toghin is a town in the Doulougou Department of Bazèga Province in central Burkina Faso.

Population
Year	Pop.	±%
1985	1,085	—
2006	935	−13.8%
2019	1,046	+11.9%
