= Kayao =

- Location in Burkina Faso
- Coordinates: 12°0′47″N 1°50′38″W
- Country: Burkina Faso
- Region: Centre-Sud Region
- Province: Bazèga Province
- Department: Kayao Department

Population (2019)
  - Total: 2,912

Kayao is the capital of the Kayao Department of Bazèga Province in central Burkina Faso.

Population
Year	Pop.	±%
1985	3,513	—
2006	2,240	−36.2%
2019	2,912	+30.0%
