= Sincéné, Doulougou =

Sincéné
- Location in Burkina Faso
- Coordinates: 11°54′N 1°35′W
- Country: Burkina Faso
- Region: Centre-Sud Region
- Province: Bazèga Province
- Department: Doulougou Department

Population (2019)
  - Total: 678

Sincéné (or Sinsiéné) is a village in the Doulougou Department of Bazèga Province in central Burkina Faso.

Population
Year	Pop.	±%
1985	762	—
2006	728	−4.5%
2019	678	−6.9%
