= Doulougou =

- Location in Burkina Faso
- Coordinates: 11°59′22″N 1°27′38″W
- Country: Burkina Faso
- Region: Centre-Sud Region
- Province: Bazèga Province
- Department: Doulougou Department

Population (2019)
  - Total: 957

Doulougou is the capital of the Doulougou Department of Bazèga Province in central Burkina Faso.

Population
Year	Pop.	±%
1985	618	—
2006	661	+7.0%
2019	957	+44.8%
