= Somassi, Bazèga =

Coordinates: 12°27′N 1°58′W

Somassi Sommassi
- Interactive map of Somassi
- Country: Burkina Faso
- Region: Centre-Sud Region
- Province: Bazèga Province
- Department: Gaongo Department

Population (2019)
  - Total: 524

Somassi or Sonmassen is a village in the Gaongo Department of Bazèga Province in central Burkina Faso.

Population
Year	Pop.	±%
1985	132	—
2006	595	+350.8%
2019	524	−11.9%
