= Gaongo =

Gaongo Gaongho
- Location in Burkina Faso
- Coordinates: 12°0′21″N 1°9′50″W
- Country: Burkina Faso
- Region: Centre-Sud Region
- Province: Bazèga Province
- Department: Gaongo Department

Population (2019)
  - Total: 3,694

Gaongo is the capital of the Gaongo Department of Bazèga Province in central Burkina Faso.

Population
Year	Pop.	±%
1985	1,770	—
2006	2,361	+33.4%
2019	3,694	+56.5%
