= Yargo, Burkina Faso =

Yargo is the name of several villages in Burkina Faso, including the following:

- Yargo, Boulkiemdé
- Yargo, Kombissiri
- Yargo, Toece
- Yargo, also Yorgo Kosyama, located at 12°18′15″N 1°30′18″W
- Yargo, located at 13°38′N 2°38′W
- Yargo, located at 13°28′N 1°33′W
- Yargo, located at 13°24′N 2°36′W
- Yargo, also called Iarogo, located at 13°10′N 1°52′W
- Yargo, located at 13°03′N 1°22′W
- Yargo, located at 12°44′N 1°18′W
- Yargo, located at 12°39′N 0°35′W
- Yargo, located at 12°22′N 0°52′W
- Yargo, located at 12°19′N 0°31′W
- Yargo, located at 12°16′N 0°26′W
- Yargo, located at 12°14′N 0°22′W
- Yargo, located at 12°13′N 2°05′W
- Yargo, located at 12°11′N 2°11′W
- Yargo, located at 12°04′N 0°17′W
- Yargo, located at 11°49′N 1°09′W
- Galo, also called Yargo, located at 11°40′N 1°39′W
- Yargo Kiongo, also called Yargo, located at 12°29′19″N 1°28′24″W
- Yargo, located at 12°10′35″N 1°30′39″W
- Yargo, located at 12°06′27″N 1°21′16″W
- Yargo, located at 12°21′23″N 1°38′43″W
