= Awa Ilboudo =

Burkinabé football referee

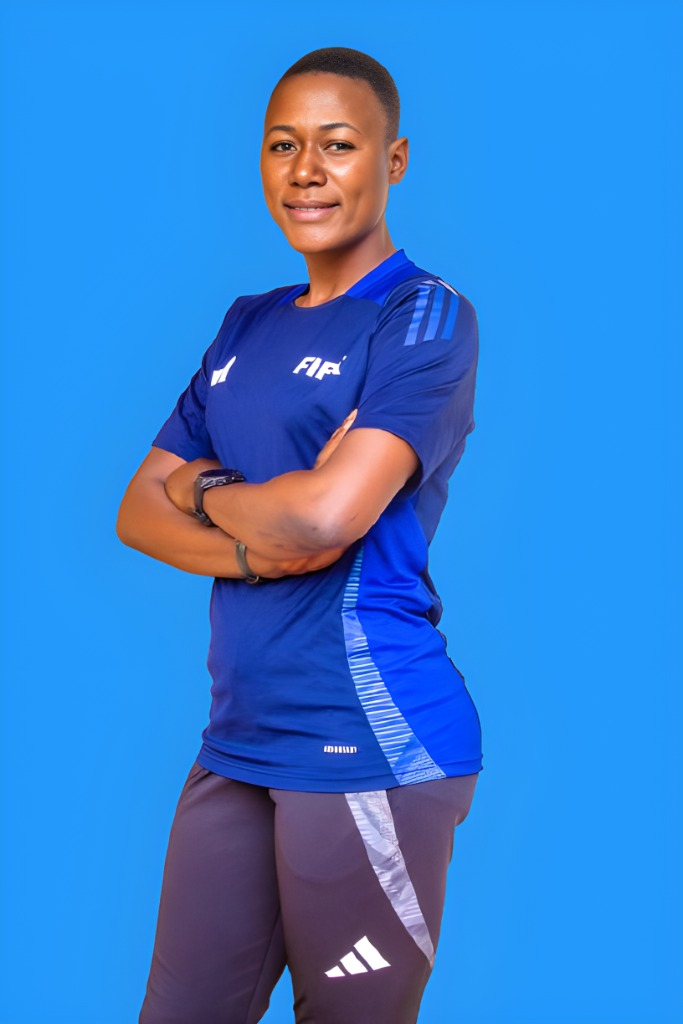
- Full name: Awa Alphonsine Ornella Ilboudo
- Born: Saponé, Burkina Faso
- Other occupation: Police non-commissioned officer

Domestic
Years	League	Role
2020–present	Burkinabé Women's Championship	Referee

Awa Alphonsine Ornella Ilboudo is a Burkinabé international football referee and police non-commissioned officer. She has been an international football referee since 2022.

== Early life and education ==
Ilboudo was born in Saponé. From a young age, she developed an interest in football, regularly playing with boys in her hometown and later attending training sessions of the women's team of the US des Forces Armées while visiting Ouagadougou.

During her secondary school years, she was selected for l'Union Sportive Scolaire et Universitaire du Burkina Faso (USSU-BF) team and participated in school competitions. Around 2013–14, she was introduced to refereeing by former referee and teacher Adama Bado, who organised training sessions for young referees in Saponé and assigned them to officiate matches organised by the Organisation sportive des écoles primaires (OSEP).

In 2016, after obtaining her baccalauréat and moving to Ouagadougou for university studies, she successfully applied for a referee recruitment programme organised by the Burkinabé Football Federation and became a district referee.

== Career ==
Ilboudo initially aspired to become a professional footballer, but was advised that beginning a playing career at the age of 19 or 20 would make reaching the professional level difficult. She subsequently decided to pursue refereeing instead while maintaining her passion for football.

She progressed through the national refereeing ranks, becoming a league referee in 2018 and later obtaining federal referee status. In 2022, she was officially listed as a FIFA international referee.

Ilboudo has officiated at several regional and continental competitions. In May 2024, she took part in the WAFU-B U17 Boys' Tournament in Ghana, where she served as fourth official for multiple matches. In August 2024, she officiated at the qualifying tournament for the CAF Women's Champions League in Ivory Coast, serving as referee for both the opening match and the final. In June 2025, she was selected for her first Women's Africa Cup of Nations in Morocco.

She has also officiated several Coupe du Faso finals, including multiple appointments as central referee.

In November 2025, Ilboudo was named Best Female Referee for the second consecutive year.

== Career outside refereeing ==
Alongside her refereeing career, Ilboudo serves as a non-commissioned officer in the Burkina Faso National Police. She entered the police service after passing a national competitive examination in 2017 and completing training at the National Police School.

She also pursued higher education in communication studies. In 2022, she obtained a diploma in Information and Communication Sciences and Techniques from the Institut des sciences et techniques de l'information et de la communication (ISTIC). In 2024, she completed a professional bachelor's degree in corporate communication before enrolling in a master's programme in project management.
