= Kayao Department =

Coordinates: 12°00′47″N 1°50′38″W

Kayao
- Department
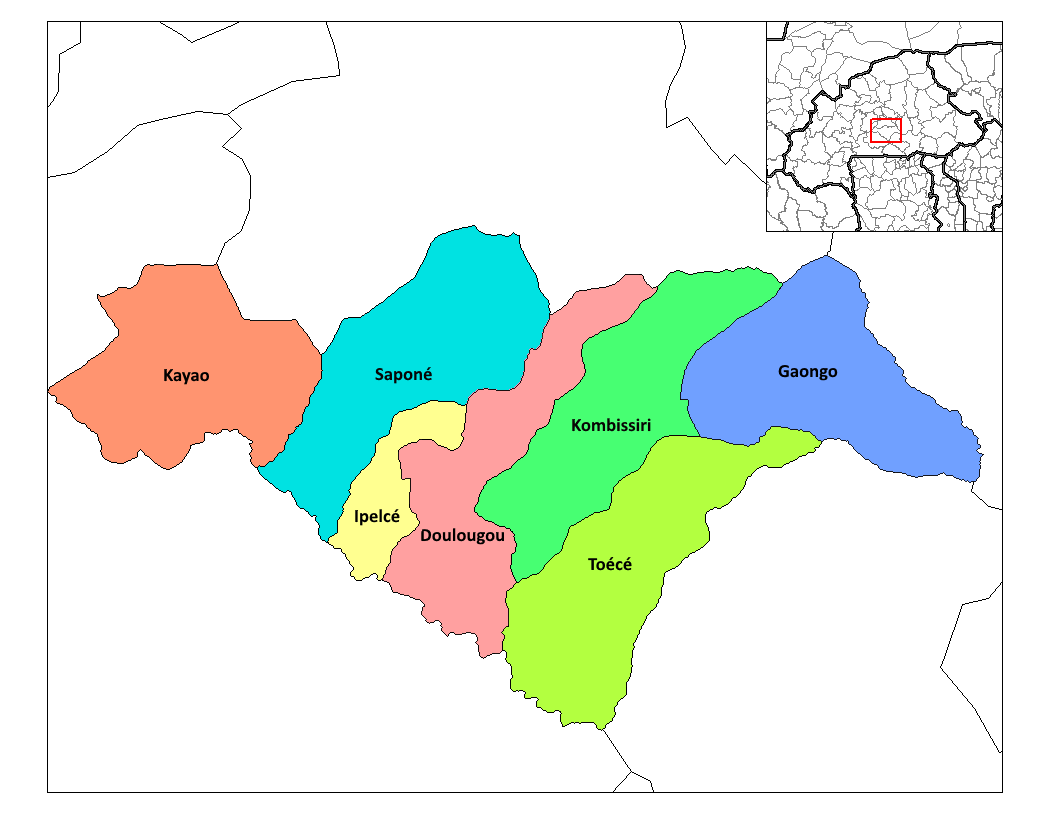
- Kayao Department location in the province
- Country: Burkina Faso
- Province: Bazèga Province

Population (1996)
  - Total: 37,615
- Time zone: UTC+0 (GMT 0)

Kayao is a department or commune of Bazèga Province in central Burkina Faso. Its capital lies at the town of Kayao. According to the 1996 census, the department has a total population of 37,615.

== Towns and villages ==
- Kayao
- Dapoury
- Doundouni
- Goumsin
- Ilyalla
- Kilou
- Kinkirou
- Kossilci
- Kossoghin
- Koukoulou
- Lado
- Pinghin
- Poa
- Rellou
- Sancé
- Sondré
- Singdin
- Tim-Tim
- Yada
- Yallo-Gouroungou
- Yellou
- Yéaoanga
- Gomogho
- Goumsa
