= Toece =

- Location in Burkina Faso
- Coordinates: 11°49′48″N 1°15′59″W
- Country: Burkina Faso
- Region: Centre-Sud Region
- Province: Bazèga Province
- Department: Toece Department

Population (2019)
  - Total: 3,701

Toece is the capital of the Toece Department of Bazèga Province in central Burkina Faso.

Population
Year	Pop.	±%
1985	2,282	—
2006	2,256	−1.1%
2019	3,701	+64.1%
