= Doulougou Department =

Coordinates: 11°59′N 1°27′W

Doulougou
- Department
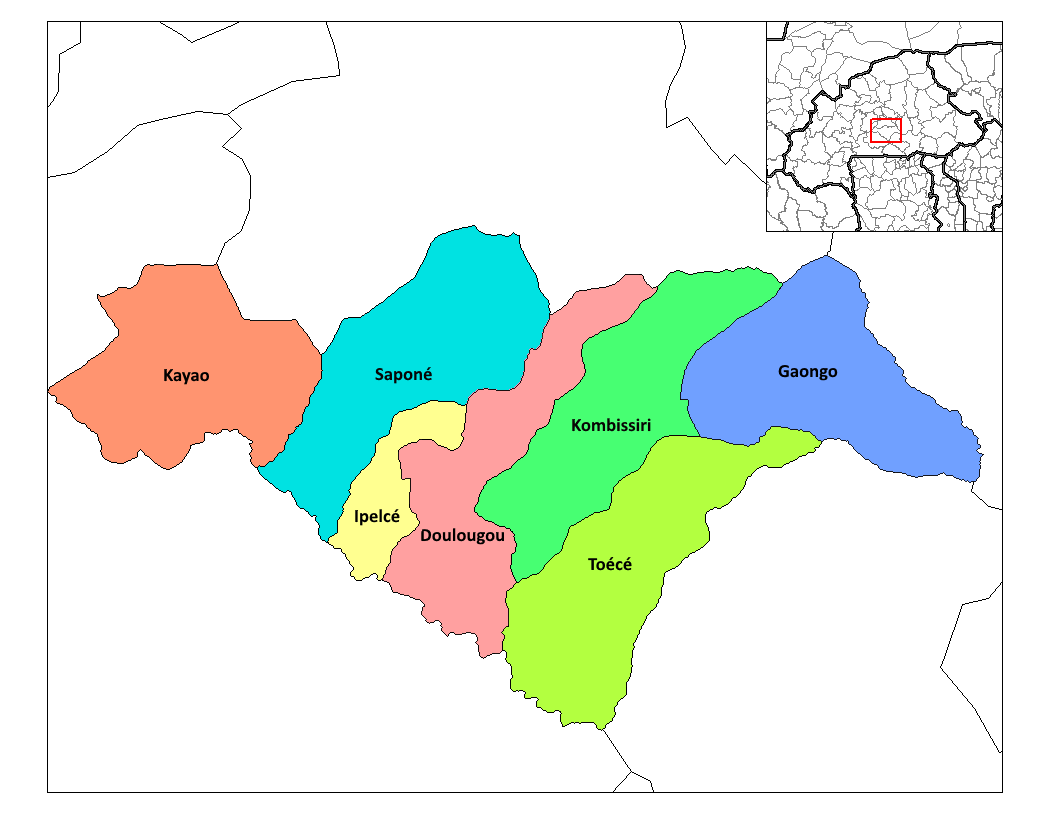
- Doulougou Department location in the province
- Country: Burkina Faso
- Province: Bazèga Province

Population (2005)
  - Total: 25,935
- Time zone: UTC+0 (GMT 0)

Doulougou is a department or commune of Bazèga Province in central Burkina Faso. Its capital lies at the town of Doulougou. According to the 1996 census the department has a total population of 25,935.

== Towns and villages ==
· Doulougou (capital) · Bangléongo · Bélégré · Bingla · Borogo · Dabogtinga · Douré · Gana · Godin · Guidgrétinga · Guidissi · Kagamzincé · Kombous-Youngo · Lamzoudo · Nabdogo · Nabinskiema · Pibsé · Poédogo · Rakaye Mossi · Rakaye Yarcé · Sampogrétinga · Samsaongo · Sarana · Seloghin · Silemba · Sincéné · Soulli · Tampouri · Toébanéga · Toghin · Wanféré · Wattinoma · Widi · Yanga · Yougritenga ·
