= Gaongo Department =

Coordinates: 12°03′30″N 1°09′50″W

Gaongo
- Department
- Interactive map of Gaongo
- Country: Burkina Faso
- Province: Bazèga Province

Population (2005)
  - Total: 23,751
- Time zone: UTC+0 (GMT 0)

Gaongo is a department or commune of Bazèga Province in central Burkina Faso. Its capital lies at the town of Gaongo. According to the 1996 census the department has a total population of 23,751.

== Towns and villages ==
· Gaongo (capital) · Douaba · Dassamkandé · Gomasgo · Kombougo · Nafbanga · Nakomestinga · Neblaboumbou · Somassi · Tambili · Tanwoko · Vossé · Wardogo
