= Ipelcé Department =

Coordinates: 11°57′36″N 1°32′42″W

Ipelce
- Department
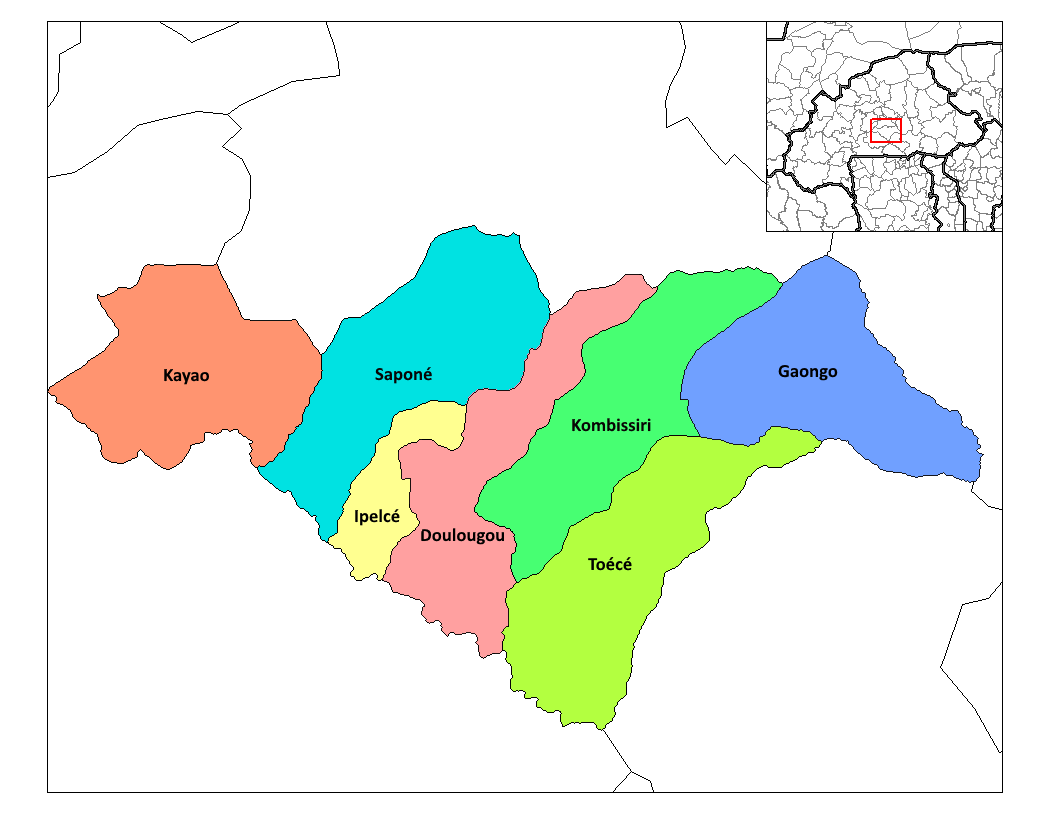
- Ipelce Department location in the province
- Country: Burkina Faso
- Province: Bazèga Province

Population (2005)
  - Total: 12,802
- Time zone: UTC+0 (GMT 0)

Ipelce is a department or commune of Bazèga Province in central Burkina Faso. Its capital lies at the town of Ipelce. According to the 1996 census, the department has a total population of 12,802 .

== Towns and villages ==
· Ipelce · Babdo · Bandéla · Banghingo · Guisma · Kactinga · Nacombogo · Narogtinga · Sagabtinga-Yarcé · Sambin · Sandeba · Siltougdo · Zinguedeghin ·
