= Kombissiri =

- City
- Location within Burkina Faso, West Africa
- Coordinates: 12°04′N 1°20′W
- Country: Burkina Faso
- Region: Centre-Sud Region
- Province: Bazèga Province
- Department: Kombissiri Department
- Elevation: 303 m (994 ft)

Population (2019 census)
  - Total: 28,617
- Time zone: UTC+0 (GMT)

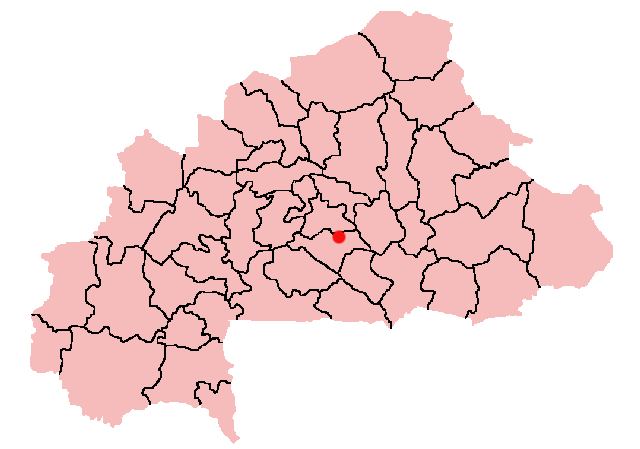
Location of Kombissiri with Burkina Faso

Kombissiri is the capital of the province of Bazèga in Burkina Faso.

Population
Year	Pop.	±%
1985	12,429	—
2006	23,460	+88.8%
2019	28,617	+22.0%
