= Daouda Malam Wanké =

Military leader of Niger in 1999

- Wanké in 1999

6th President of Niger (as Chairman/President of the National Reconciliation Council of Niger)
- In office April 9, 1999 – December 22, 1999
- Prime Minister: Ibrahim Hassane Mayaki
- Vice President: Soumana Zanguina
- Preceded by: Ibrahim Baré Maïnassara
- Succeeded by: Mamadou Tandja

Personal details
- Born: May 6, 1946 or 1954 near Niamey, Niger, French West Africa
- Died: September 15, 2004 (aged 58) or age 50 Niamey, Niger
- Party: Independent
- Children: 4

Daouda Malam Wanké (May 6, 1946 – September 15, 2004) was a military and political leader in Niger. He was a member of the Hausa ethnic group.

Wanké's year of birth is disputed. Many sources claim it is 1954 while others suggest 1946.

He held many other offices.

== Biography ==
He was born in Yellou, a town near Niger's capital, Niamey. He entered the Niger military, rising to the rank of Major. On April 9, 1999, Wanké led a military coup in which President Ibrahim Baré Maïnassara, who himself had come to power in a military coup, was assassinated. For two days there was much political uncertainty in Niger, as the prime minister, Ibrahim Hassane Mayaki and several others also had claims on the presidency. Mayaki's claim was briefly only from 9 April until 11 April. On April 11, 1999, Wanké became official president, while before he was already since 9 April 1999 the head of state. Heading a transitional government that promised to hold elections later that year.

Wanké's government fulfilled its promise, and turned over power to the newly elected president, Mamadou Tandja, in December 1999. Wanké subsequently suffered from various health problems, including cardiovascular troubles and high blood pressure. During the last months of his life, he traveled to Libya, Morocco and Switzerland for medical treatment. He died in Niamey.

Preceded by Ibrahim Baré Maïnassara	President of Niger (as Chairman/President of the National Reconciliation Council of Niger); 1999	Succeeded by Mamadou Tandja
