= Poédogo, Doulougou =

Coordinates: 11.98664°N 1.45971°W

Poédogo
- Interactive map of Poédogo
- Country: Burkina Faso
- Region: Centre-Sud Region
- Province: Bazèga Province
- Department: Doulougou Department

Population (2019)
  - Total: 685

Poédogo is a village in the Doulougou Department of Bazèga Province in central Burkina Faso.

Population
Year	Pop.	±%
1985	637	—
2006	616	−3.3%
2019	685	+11.2%
