= Saponé, Burkina Faso =

Saponé
- Location in Burkina Faso
- Coordinates: 12°3′10″N 1°36′13″W
- Country: Burkina Faso
- Region: Centre-Sud Region
- Province: Bazèga Province
- Department: Saponé Department
- Elevation: 306 m (1,004 ft)

Population (2019)
  - Total: 4,572

Saponé is the capital of the Saponé Department of Bazèga Province in central Burkina Faso.

== Geography ==
The nearest towns and villages include Kologonaba (0.8 nm), Ouidi (0.7 nm), Nabitenga (1.3 nm), Bonogo (1.4 nm), Tanlilli (1.4 nm), Goden (1.7 nm) and Sakpelse (1.0 nm).this is a little ville

== Sister city ==
- Brest, France

== Economy ==
The economy is dominated by cotton production. The harvest takes place in October and November, at which time buyers arrive by truck to take the crop to market. The town also has a fruit plantation.

Population
Year	Pop.	±%
2006	2,556	—
2019	4,572	+78.9%
