= Pissi, Gnagna =

Pissi
- Location in Burkina Faso
- Coordinates: 12°29′N 0°13′W
- Country: Burkina Faso
- Region: Est Region
- Province: Gnagna Province
- Department: Bilanga Department

Population (2019)
  - Total: 746

Pissi is a village in the Bilanga Department of Gnagna Province in eastern Burkina Faso. The village has a population of 417.

Population
Year	Pop.	±%
1985	297	—
2006	747	+151.5%
2019	746	−0.1%
