= Saponé Department =

Coordinates: 12°06′N 1°34′W

Saponé
- Department
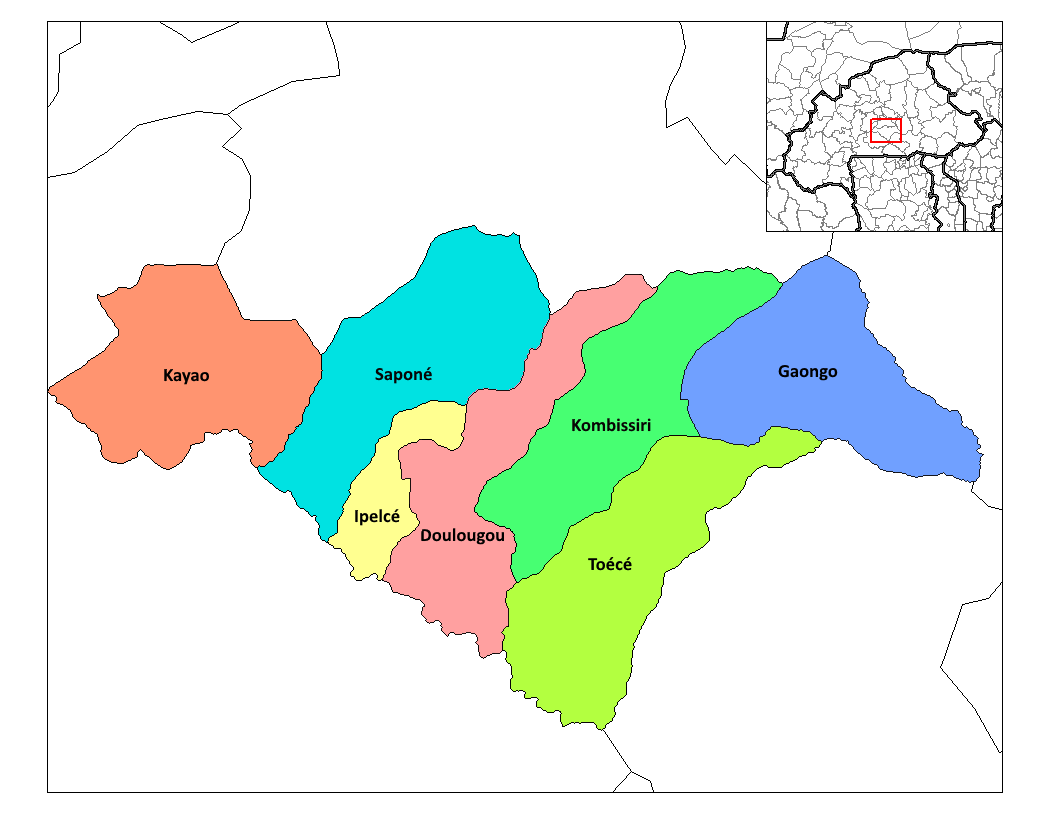
- Saponé Department location in the province
- Country: Burkina Faso
- Province: Bazèga Province

Population (1996)
  - Total: 50,541
- Time zone: UTC+0 (GMT 0)

Saponé is a department or commune of Bazèga Province in central Burkina Faso. Its capital lies at the town of Saponé. According to the 1996 census the department has a total population of 50,541 .

== Towns and villages ==
- Bassemyam
- Bonogo
- Karangtanghin
