= Toécé Department =

Coordinates: 11°49′48″N 1°15′59″W

Toece
- Department
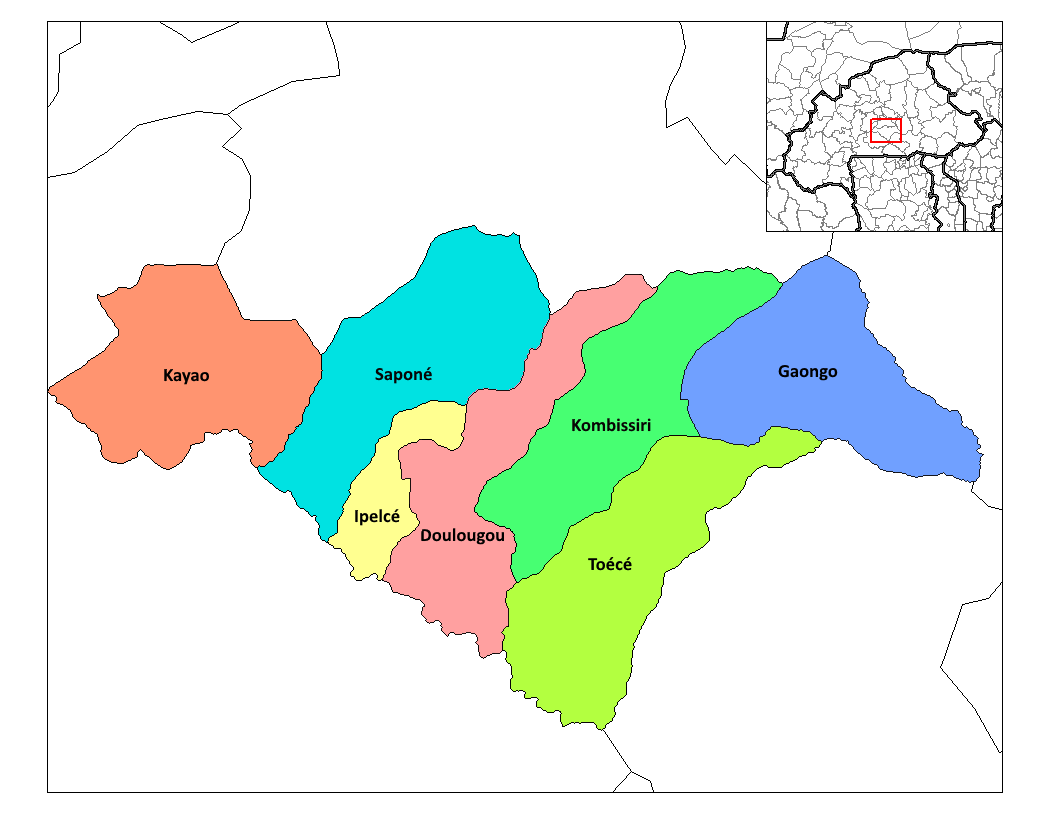
- Toece Department location in the province
- Country: Burkina Faso
- Province: Bazèga Province

Population (1996)
  - Total: 33,608
- Time zone: UTC+0 (GMT 0)

Toece is a department or commune of Bazèga Province in central Burkina Faso. Its capital lies at the town of Toece. According to the 1996 census, the department has a total population of 33,608.
