= Kombissiri Department =

Coordinates: 12°4′N 1°21′W

Kombissiri
- Department
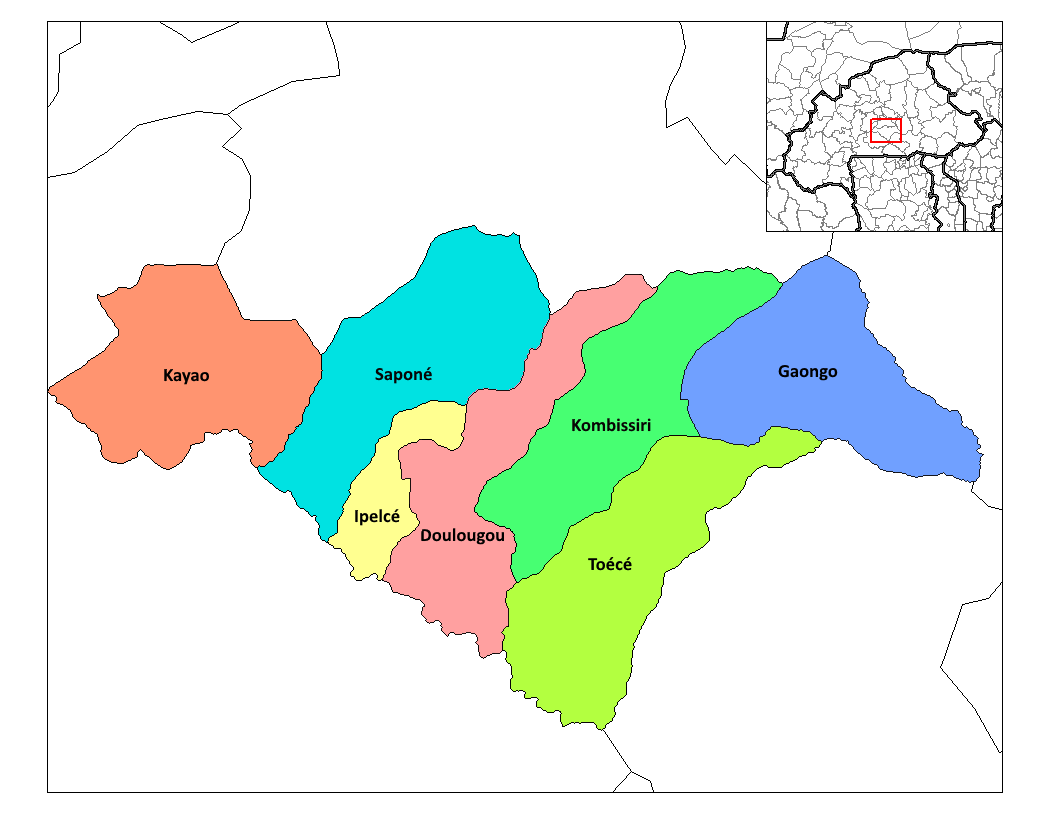
- Kombissiri Department location in the province
- Country: Burkina Faso
- Province: Bazèga Province

Area
  - Department: 230.3 sq mi (596.6 km^{2})

Population (2019 census)
  - Department: 77,756
  - Density: 337.6/sq mi (130.3/km^{2})
  - Urban: 28,617
- Time zone: UTC+0 (GMT 0)

Kombissiri is a department or commune of Bazèga Province in central Burkina Faso. Its capital is the town of Kombissiri. According to the 2019 census the department has a total population of 77,756.
