= Bazèga Province =

Coordinates: 12°04′01″N 1°20′12″W

Bazèga
- Province
- Location in Burkina Faso

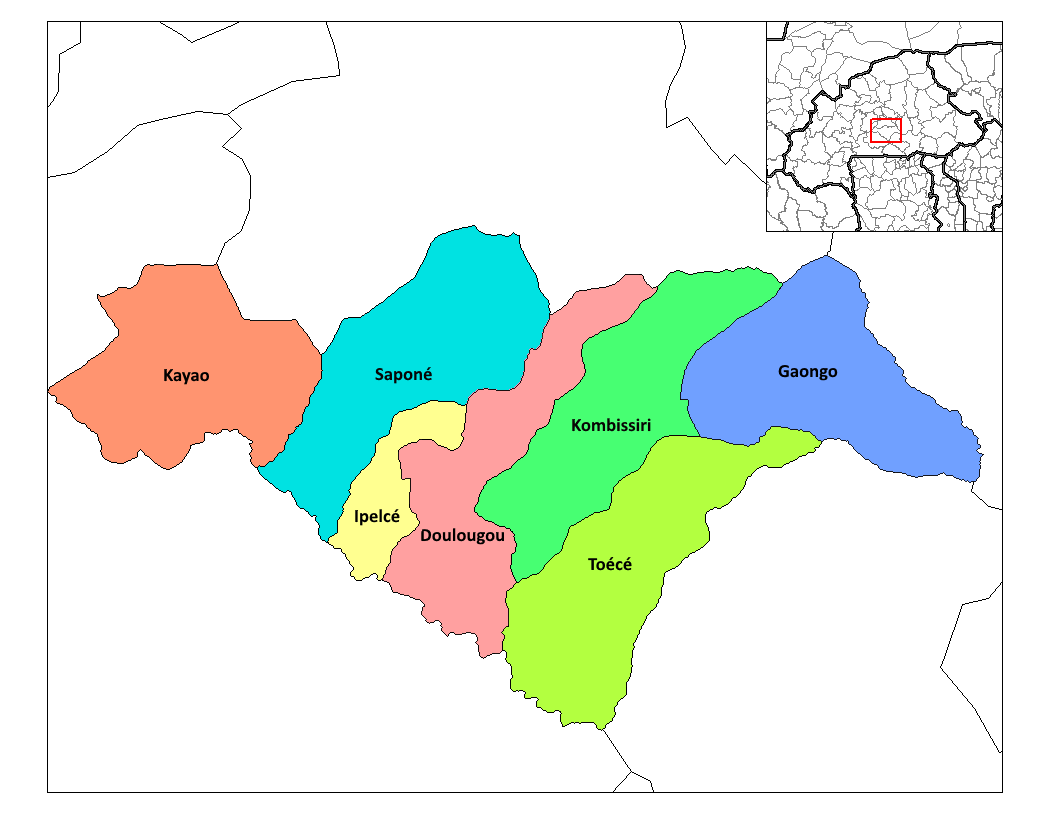
- Provincial map of its departments
- Country: Burkina Faso
- Region: Centre-Sud Region
- Capital: Kombissiri

Area
  - Province: 3,963 km^{2} (1,530 sq mi)

Population (2019 census)
  - Province: 280,793
  - Density: 70.85/km^{2} (183.5/sq mi)
  - Urban: 28,617
- Time zone: UTC+0 (GMT 0)

Bazèga is one of the 45 provinces of Burkina Faso and is in Centre-Sud Region. The capital of Bazèga is Kombissiri. Bazèga had a population of 238,202 in 2006, and in 2011 it was estimated to be 263,603.

== Education ==
In 2011, the province had 187 primary schools and 23 secondary schools.

== Healthcare ==
In 2011, the province had 37 health and social promotion centers (Centres de santé et de promotion sociale), 7 doctors, and 109 nurses.

== Departments ==
Bazèga is divided into 7 departments:

The Departments of Bazèga
Commune	Capital	Population Census 2006)
Doulougou Department	Doulougou	26,738
Gaongo Department	Gaongo	25,753
Ipelce Department	Ipelce	13,182
Kayao Department	Kayao	33,994
Kombissiri Department	Kombissiri	66,342
Saponé Department	Saponé	38,958
Toece Department	Toece	33,265

== See also ==
- Regions of Burkina Faso
- Provinces of Burkina Faso
- Communes of Burkina Faso
