= Nazinon Region =

Region of Burkina Faso

Nazinon Centre-Sud
- Region
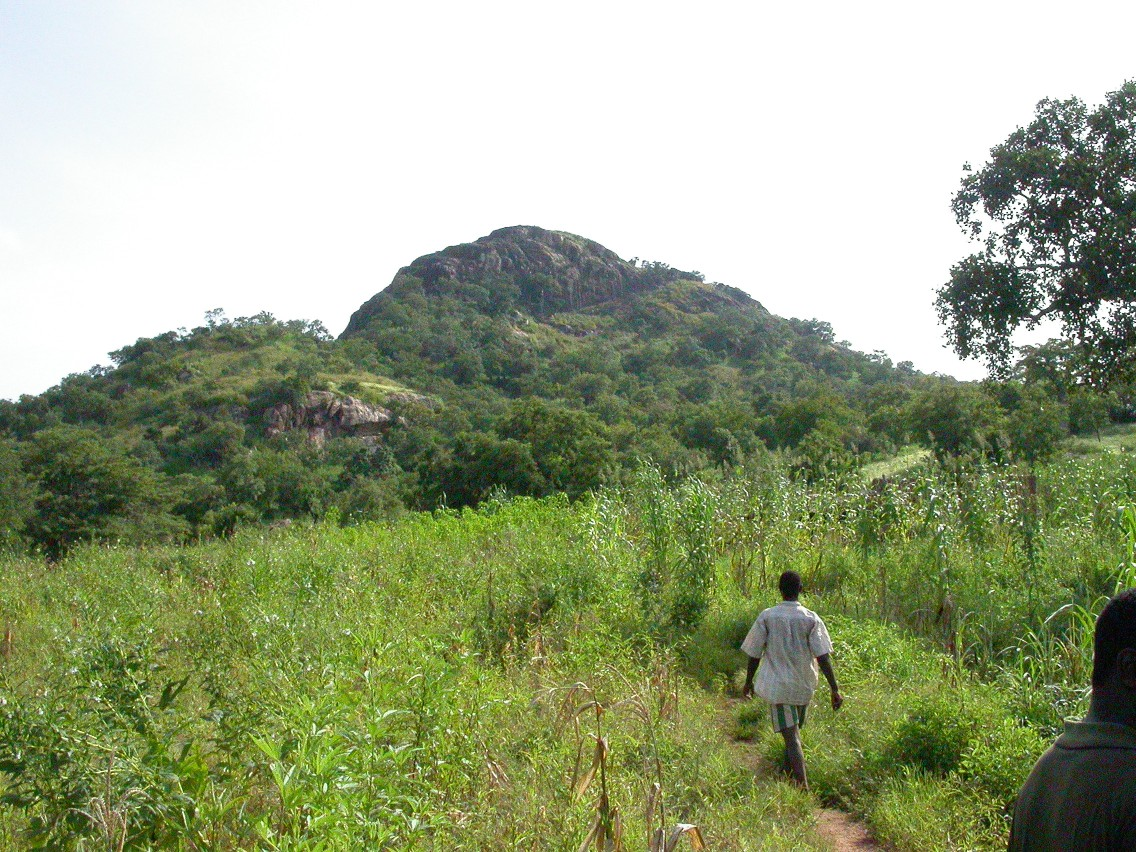
- A mountain, Pic de Nahouri, in the region

- Location in Burkina Faso
- Coordinates: 11°30′N 1°10′W
- Country: Burkina Faso
- Capital: Manga

Area
  - Region: 4,368 sq mi (11,313 km^{2})

Population (2019 census)
  - Region: 788,341
  - Density: 180.48/sq mi (69.685/km^{2})
  - Urban: 85,316
- Time zone: UTC+0 (GMT 0)
- HDI (2017): 0.432 low · 3rd

Nazinon, formerly known as Centre-Sud ([sɑ̃tʁ.syd], "South Central"), is one of Burkina Faso's 17 administrative regions. The population of Nazinon was 638,379 in 2006 and was estimated at 722,631 in 2011. The region's capital is Manga. Three provinces – Bazèga, Nahouri, and Zoundwéogo – make up the region.

As of 2019, the population of the region was 788,341 with 52.6% females. It is the least populous region in Burkina Faso and contains 3.84% of the total population of the country. The child mortality rate was 61, infant mortality rate was 70, and the mortality of children under five was 127. As of 2007, the literacy rate in the region was 15.9%, compared to a national average of 28.3%. The coverage of cereal need compared to the total production of the region was 69%.

== Geography ==
Most of Burkina Faso is a wide plateau formed by riverine systems and is called falaise de Banfora. There are three major rivers, the Red Volta, Black Volta, and White Volta, which cut through different valleys. The climate is generally hot, with unreliable rains across different seasons. Gold and quartz are common minerals found across the country, while manganese deposits are also common. The dry season is usually from October to May, and rains are common during the wet season from June to September. The soil texture is porous and hence the yield is also poor. The average elevation is around 200 m (660 ft) to 300 m (980 ft) above mean sea level. Among West African countries, Burkino Faso has the largest elephant population and the country is replete with game reserves. The southern regions are more tropical in nature and have Savannah and forests. The principal river is the Black Volta, that originates in the southern region and drains into Ghana. The areas near the rivers usually have flies like tsetse and similium, which are carriers of sleep sickness and river blindness. The average rainfall in the region is around 100 cm (39 in) compared to northern regions that receive only 25 cm (9.8 in) rainfall.

== Demographics ==
Historical population
Year	Pop.	±% p.a.
1985	432,164	—
1996	530,696	+1.88%
2006	641,443	+1.91%
2019	788,341	+1.60%

As of 2019, the population of the region was 788,341 with 52.6% females. The population in the region was 3.84% of the total population of the country. The child mortality rate was 61, infant mortality rate was 70 and the mortality of children under five was 127. As of 2007, among the working population, there were 79.3% employees, 9.9% under employed, 9.6% inactive people, 10.8% not working and 1.2% unemployed people in the region.

Adult (15+) literacy in the region increased from 8.6% in 2003 to 15.9% in 2007 but was still below the national average of 28.3%. In 2011 the region had 506 primary schools and 61 secondary schools. In 2010–2011, 7.6% of the population (aged 13–19) attended secondary school, which was below the national average of 10.7%. As of 2007, the literacy rate in the region was 15.9%, compared to a national average of 28.3%. The gross primary enrolment was 83.6% pos-primary was 23.9% and gross secondary school enrolment was 6.2. There were 88 boys and 7 girls enrolled in the primary and post-secondary level. There were no teachers in primary & post-secondary level, while there were 394 teachers in post-primary and post-secondary level.

== Economy ==
As of 2007, there were 423.3 km (263.0 mi) of highways, 13 km (8.1 mi) of regional roads and 227.6 km (141.4 mi) of county roads. The first set of car traffic was 12, first set of two-wheeler traffic was 1,093 and the total classified road network was 664. The total corn produced during 2015 was 101,947 tonnes, cotton was 46,542 tonnes, cowpea was 18,115 tonnes, ground nut was 34,656 tonnes, millet was 31,435 tonnes, rice was 20,356 tonnes and sorghum was 84,588 tonnes. The coverage of cereal need compared to the total production of the region was 69.00%.

== Provinces ==
Province	Capital	2006
Bazèga Province	Kombissiri	238,202
Nahouri Province	Pô	155,463
Zoundwéogo Province	Manga	244,714

The region has three provinces which together include 16 departments. Burkina Faso got independence from French Colonial Empire during 1960. It was originally called Upper Volta. There have been military coups until 1983 when Captain Thomas Sankara took control and implemented radical left wing policies. He was ousted by Blaise Compaore, who continued for 27 years until 2014, when a popular uprising ended his rule. As per Law No.40/98/AN in 1998, Burkina Faso adhered to decentralization to provide administrative and financial autonomy to local communities. There are 13 administrative regions, each governed by a governor. The regions are subdivided into 45 provinces, which are further subdivided into 351 communes. The communes may be urban or rural and are interchangeable. There are other administrative entities like department and village. An urban commune has typically 10,000 people under it. If any commune is not able to get 75% of its planned budget in revenues for three years, the autonomy is taken off. The communes are administered by elected mayors. The communes are stipulated to develop economic, social and cultural values of its citizens. A commune has financial autonomy and can interact with other communes, government agencies or international entities.
