= Youga (disambiguation) =

Youga is a village in the Zabré Department of Boulgou Province in south-eastern Burkina Faso. Youga may also refer to:

- Youga (painting), a style of painting
- Youga (surname), a surname
- Youga Dogorou, a Dogon village in Mali
