= Burkinabe nationality law =

Persons and Family Code: Nationality Code

Parliament of Burkina Faso
- Long title: Zatu an VII 13 du 16 novembre 1989 portant institution et application d'un code des personnes et de la famille au Burkina Faso (Note: The Nationality Code appears in articles 140–230.)
- Enacted by: Government of Burkina Faso
- Status: Current legislation

Burkinabe nationality law is regulated by the Constitution of Burkina Faso, as amended; (Note: The Constitution in Article 101, merely stipulates that nationality will be defined in law.) the Persons and Family Code (French: Code des personnes et de la famille), and its revisions; and various international agreements to which the country is a signatory. These laws determine who is, or is eligible to be, a national of Burkina Faso. The legal means to acquire nationality, formal legal membership in a nation, differ from the domestic relationship of rights and obligations between a national and the nation, known as citizenship. Burkinabe nationality is typically obtained under the principle of jus sanguinis, i.e. by birth in Burkina Faso or abroad to parents with Burkinabe nationality. It can be granted to persons with an affiliation to the country, or to a permanent resident who has lived in the country for a given period of time through naturalization.

== Acquisition of nationality ==
Nationality can be acquired in Burkina Faso through birth or naturalization.

=== By birth ===
- Persons born anywhere to at least one parent who is a national of Burkina Faso;
- Persons born to foreigners in Burkina Faso who have been a usual resident of the country and are still residing in the territory the age of majority acquires nationality at majority;
- Persons born in the territory who might otherwise be stateless; or
- Foundlings or orphans of unknown parentage.

=== By naturalization ===
Naturalization can be granted to persons who have resided in the territory for a sufficient period of time to confirm they understand the customs and traditions of the society. General provisions are that applicants be of good character, in good mental health and have no criminal history of sentencing greater than one year. Nationality may also be granted for service to the nation or under exceptional circumstances. The general residency requirement is ten years, but in the case of someone born in Burkina Faso or for service to the nation the residency requirement is reduced to two years. Besides foreigners meeting the criteria, other persons who may be naturalized include:

- Minor children, adult children, or the spouse of a naturalized Burkinabe, having lived in the territory for five years;
- Adoptees of nationals of Burkina Faso;
- Foreigners or stateless persons who marry nationals of Burkina Faso, acquire nationality after being married to a Burkinabe national for 5 years; or
- Persons who have rendered or can render exemplary services, such as in the development of agricultural, artistic, industrial, innovative, literary, or scientific contributions to the nation.

== Loss of nationality ==
Burkinabe nationals may renounce their nationality provided they will not become stateless. Persons may be denaturalized in Burkina Faso for committing crimes against the state or ordinary crimes; fraud in a naturalization petition; or disloyal or treasonous acts.

== Dual nationality ==
As the law of Burkina Faso does not address dual nationality, it is assumed to be permitted in most circumstances, though custom may vary.

== History ==
=== African kingdoms of the Upper Volta (1200–1896) ===
From the eleventh century, people moving from Ghana invaded the area establishing dominance in the region east of Lake Chad and between the Red and White Volta Rivers. These people, known as the Mossi, expanded their territory and interacted with Muslim refugees and merchants, establishing trade networks. They also interacted with the Mali and Songhai Empires both trading with and raiding them for goods through the 1500s. The Fulbe theocracies, Songhai Empire, and Tuareg Confederacies dominated the northern region of the territory. In the central and eastern parts of the area, chiefdoms, which were linked Mossi Kingdoms and the Kong Empire were prevalent. The western and southern sections included people affiliated with the Kénédougou Kingdom, Wassoulou Empire, and other village confederations and networks. Each of these kingdoms had organized social, economic, and political systems created to facilitate trade and consolidate their states. They may or may not have been related to or had tributary relationships with each other, but there was no centralized political entity that controlled the area. Typically, these kingdoms operated under a paramount leader, who used organized structures of authority, such as village elders and local chiefs, along with kinship networks to reinforce control over his subjects in exchange for patronage, prestige, and services.

=== French colony (1896–1960) ===
In 1895, the French established the administration system that would govern its possessions in West Africa for the next sixty years. A Governor-General was installed and a headquarters was founded in Dakar, in the Colony of Senegal. Between 1896 and 1897, the French conquered the Upper Volta region and then in 1904, annexed it to the Upper Senegal and Niger Colony. The Governor-General's authority was extended to Senegal, Guinea, and the Ivory Coast colonies, and in 1899 to Dahomey and French Sudan, which would later become Mali. Under Article 109 of the French Constitution of 1848, French territories were to be governed by specific laws until the constitution was extended there. This provision laid the groundwork for nationality legislation based upon whether the native inhabitants were able to be assimilated by adopting European standards. From 1848, those persons who settled in the colonies and were from France were considered nationals who had full rights and were subject to French law. However, those born in the new territories were considered to be nationals without citizenship. Nationals in the older colonies of the Antilles, Guiana, Réunion and parts of India and Senegal were granted political rights, but those in new colonies were confirmed by a decree on 14 July 1865 to be subjects and not citizens, unless they renounced their allegiance to native custom and possessed sufficient understanding of the obligations of citizenship.

Also in 1848, slavery was abolished throughout the French Empire and the Civil Code was extended to all of the French citizens in the colonies. Under the Civil Code, women were legally incapacitated and paternal authority was established over their children. Upon marriage, a woman married to a French man automatically acquired the same nationality as her spouse. Illegitimate children were barred from inheritance and nationality could only be transmitted through a father. Non-citizen nationals were governed by traditional laws concerning marriage and inheritance which placed the well-being of the community above individual rights. These laws prevented a wife from being treated as a slave, required her husband to support her, and entitled her kin to a bride price, to compensate them for the loss of her fertility to their kinship group and secure the legality of the union. Having paid the price for the marriage contract, she and her offspring belonged to the kinship network of her husband and could be inherited if her husband died.

The French Nationality Law of 1889 codified previous statutory laws, changing the French standard from jus sanguinis to jus soli and was extended to the French West Indies. Under its terms, women who would become stateless by the rule to acquire their spouse's nationality were allowed to retain their French nationality upon marriage. The Nationality Law was modified in 1897 when it was extended to the remainder of the French colonies. Clarification in the 1897 decree included that bestowing nationality by birth in French territory only applied to children born in France, restoring descent requirements for the colonies. Under the Code de l'indigénat (Code of Indigenous Status) promulgated for Algeria in 1881 and extended to French West Africa in 1904, nationals in the new colonies followed customary law. The French West African Federation had been founded that year with the existing five colonies, of Dahomey, Guinea, Ivory Coast, Mali, Senegal, and was later expanded to include Mauritania, and Upper Senegal and Niger.

On 25 May 1912, a Décret N°. 27892 was issued specifically addressing the status of French West Africans. Under its terms, African subjects could acquire French citizenship if at the age of majority and having proved three years of established domicile in the territory, they were able to read and write French; they were of good character and assimilated to French culture, or they engaged in a public or private French enterprise for a minimum or ten years; and they had sufficient means of self-support. The language requirement could be waived for those who had received military medals or recognition of the Legion of Honor or were in the French civil service. Upon application, subjects were required to acknowledge that they gave up their personal status under customary law and were to be governed by French laws. The decree noted that married women and minor children acquired the status of their husband or father however, this was only the case if the marriage had been conducted under French law, rather than customary practice.

Following the end of World War I France passed a law, "Décret N°. 24 on 25 March 1915 that allowed subjects or protected persons who were non-citizen nationals and had established domicile in a French territory to acquire full citizenship, including the naturalization of their wives and minor children, by having received the cross of the Legion of Honor, having obtained a university degree, having rendered service to the nation, having attained the rank of an officer or received a medal from the French army, who had married a Frenchwoman and established a one year residency; or who had resided for more than ten years in a colony other than their country of origin. A 1918 decree written for French West Africa was aimed at decorated veterans of the war and their families, providing they had not previously been denied their rights nor participated in actions against French rule. In 1919, the colony of Upper Volta was carved out of Upper Senegal and Niger.

In 1927, France passed a new Nationality Law, which under Article 8, removed the requirement for married women to automatically derive the nationality of a husband and provided that her nationality could only be changed if she consented to change her nationality. It also allowed children born in France to native-born French women married to foreigners to acquire their nationality from their mothers. When it was implemented it included Guadeloupe, Martinique and Réunion but was extended to the remaining French possessions for French citizens only in 1928. Under Article 26 of the 1928 decree was the stipulation that it did not apply to natives of the French possessions except Algeria, Guadeloupe, Martinique, and Réunion. Between 1933 and 1947, the territory of Upper Volta was divided up and incorporated into the colonies of French Sudan, the Ivory Coast, and Niger. In 1938, the legal incapacity of married women was finally invalidated for French citizens. In 1939, France determined that marriage and inheritance were too significant to continue being dealt with in native courts. That year, the Mandel Decree was enacted in French West Africa as well as French Equatorial Africa. Under its terms child marriage was discouraged. It established the minimum age at marriage as fourteen for women and sixteen for men, invalidated marriages wherein spouses did not consent, and nullified levirate marriage without approval of the woman.

At the end of World War II, a statute issued on 7 March 1944 granted French citizenship to those who had performed services to the nation, such as serving as civil servants or receiving recognitions. In 1945, a new Code of French Nationality was passed, which conferred once again automatic French nationality on foreign wives of French men, but allowed mothers who were French nationals to pass their nationality to children born outside of France. It expressly applied to Algeria, French Guiana, Guadeloupe, Martinique and Réunion and was extended to the Overseas Territories in 1953, but in the case of the latter had distinctions for the rights of those who were naturalized. The Constitution of 1946 granted French citizenship to all subjects of France's territories without having to renounce their personal status as natives. Upper Volta was reconstituted in 1947. In 1951 the Jacquinot Decree strengthened the provisions of the Mandel decree in French West and Equatorial Africa. It removed women who were twenty-one years old, or divorced, from control by a father or guardian and established specific rules for the payment and determining the amount of a bride price.

The legal framework of Upper Volta was changed by a statute issued on 23 June 1956, which granted internal self-governance to French territories and expanded their Territorial Assemblies. These changes led to an increase in political activity and a press for the dissolution of the Federation of French West Africa. With the passage of the 1958 Constitution, nationality provisions were standardized for France, Overseas Departments, and Overseas Territories. Article 86 excluded the possibility for independence of the colonies. In January 1959, a constituent assembly was called to discuss building a new African federation including Dahomey, Mali, Senegal, Sudan and Upper Volta. During the talks, Upper Volta faced a decision of choosing a relationship between the federation and its relationship with the Ivory Coast. Because Upper Volta was over-populated and land locked, many Voltaics migrated or were recruited to work in the more affluent Ivory Coast, creating a dependent relationship for Upper Volta.

Strong support for Africanization, led Upper Volta to agree to join the federation in 1959 as a show of African unity, but within a month, the territory adopted a separate constitution, under pressure from the Ivory Coast and France. In 1960, President Charles de Gaulle endorsed the independence of the Mali Federation, which included Senegal and Sudan, without the imposition of economic sanctions. This led to a quest for independence in the Ivory Coast and Madagascar. The British Protected states of Nigeria and Togo were due to gain independence that year as well. Having signed a bilateral agreement for managing the Abidjan harbor and entered into the Conseil de l'Entente with the Ivory Coast, Dahomey, and Niger, Upper Volta became independent in August 1960.

=== Post-independence (1960–present) ===
The Constitution was replaced in 1960 and the following year the Nationality Code was promulgated. The 1961 Code followed French law, but made no distinction between legitimate or illegitimate children. It called for children to inherit nationality from by descent from their Voltaic-national parent or from birth in Upper Volta, provided no other nationality was conferred upon them. Foreign women automatically acquired Voltaic nationality from their spouse upon marriage, unless she specifically requested not to. Like under French law at the time, Voltaic women did not lose their nationality upon marriage, but their spouses were required to naturalize if they wished to become a national of Upper Volta. Naturalization required five years residency, assimilation into the culture of the country, and good health. Nationality could be lost by having dual nationality after the age of majority, or for performing service or actions of a citizen with allegiance to a foreign state.

In 1966, the constitution was suspended and the National Assembly dissolved. A new constitution was promulgated by plebiscite in 1970, but four years later the parliament was again dissolved and the constitution was suspended. A 1977 referendum approved a new constitution, but it was abrogated in 1980 when a coup d'état replaced the government. That year, the Federation of Voltaic Women began working on revisions to the Family Code, but coups in 1982 and 1983 led to continuing instability. In 1984, Upper Volta was renamed Burkina Faso, but subsequent coups and unrest remained prevalent until 1989. That year when the Persons and Family Code (French: Code des personnes et de la famille) was adopted, gender equality was applied. In an effort to reduce statelessness, the code provided that any spouse could automatically derive nationality by marrying a Burkinabe national, unless they chose not to do so. A transitional government was formed in 1990, which adopted a new constitution in 1991.
