= Benya =

Benya is a surname of Slavic origin, being an Americanized form of several different surnames. Notable people with the surname include:

- Anton Benya (1912–2001), Austrian politician and trade unionist
- Mascha Benya (1908–2007), Russian-born soprano

== See also ==
- Benya Krik, a fictional character from The Odessa Tales
- Benya Krik (film), a 1927 Soviet silent film
- Benya Kipala, a town in Boulgou Province, Burkina Faso
- Benya-Peulh, a village in Boulgou Province, Burkina Faso
