= Beka =

Beka may refer to:

== Places by country ==
- Beka, Burkina Faso
- Beka, Cameroon
- Beka or Bakka, Lebanon, a village, municipality and Roman temple
- Beka Valley or Beqaa Valley, Lebanon
- Beka, Khyber Pakhtunkhwa, Pakistan
- Beka, Pomeranian Voivodeship, Poland
- Beka, Hrpelje-Kozina, Slovenia
- Bakka, Suwayda, Syria (old name of town)

== People ==
- Beka (name), Georgian masculine given name
- Abdelkader Fréha (1942–2012), nicknamed Beka, Algerian football player

== Other uses ==
- Beka or Aka language, a Bantu language spoken in the Central African Republic and Republic of Congo
- Beka (weapon), a Russian PK machine gun
- Bêka & Lemoine, film production duo
- Beka Records, a record label from early 20th-century Germany
- Rebekah "Beka" Cooper, a character in the Provost's Dog trilogy by Tamora Pierce

== See also ==
- Abeka, a publisher affiliated with Pensacola Christian College, Florida, U.S.
