= Bourma =

Bourma may refer to:

- Bourma, Boulgou, Burkina Faso
- Bourma, Ganzourgou, Burkina Faso
- A variation of baklava
