= Dissin =

- Town
- Location within Burkina Faso
- Coordinates: 10°56′N 2°56′W
- Country: Burkina Faso
- Province: Ioba
- Department: Dissin Department

Dissin is a town and seat of Dissin Department in the province of Ioba in Burkina Faso, near the northwest corner of Ghana.
