= Bangou =

Bangou may refer to:

== Places ==
- Bangou, Burkina Faso
- Bangou, Cameroon
- Bangou, Mauritania

== Family name ==
- Henri Bangou (1924–1963), French politician and cardiologist
- Jacques Bangou (born 1992), French politician
