= Gonse (disambiguation) =

Gonse or Gonsé may refer to:

- Charles-Arthur Gonse (1838-1917), French soldier
- Louis Gonse
- Gonse, a village in Burkina Faso
- Gonsé, a village in Burkina Faso
