= Burkina Faso–Ghana border =

International border

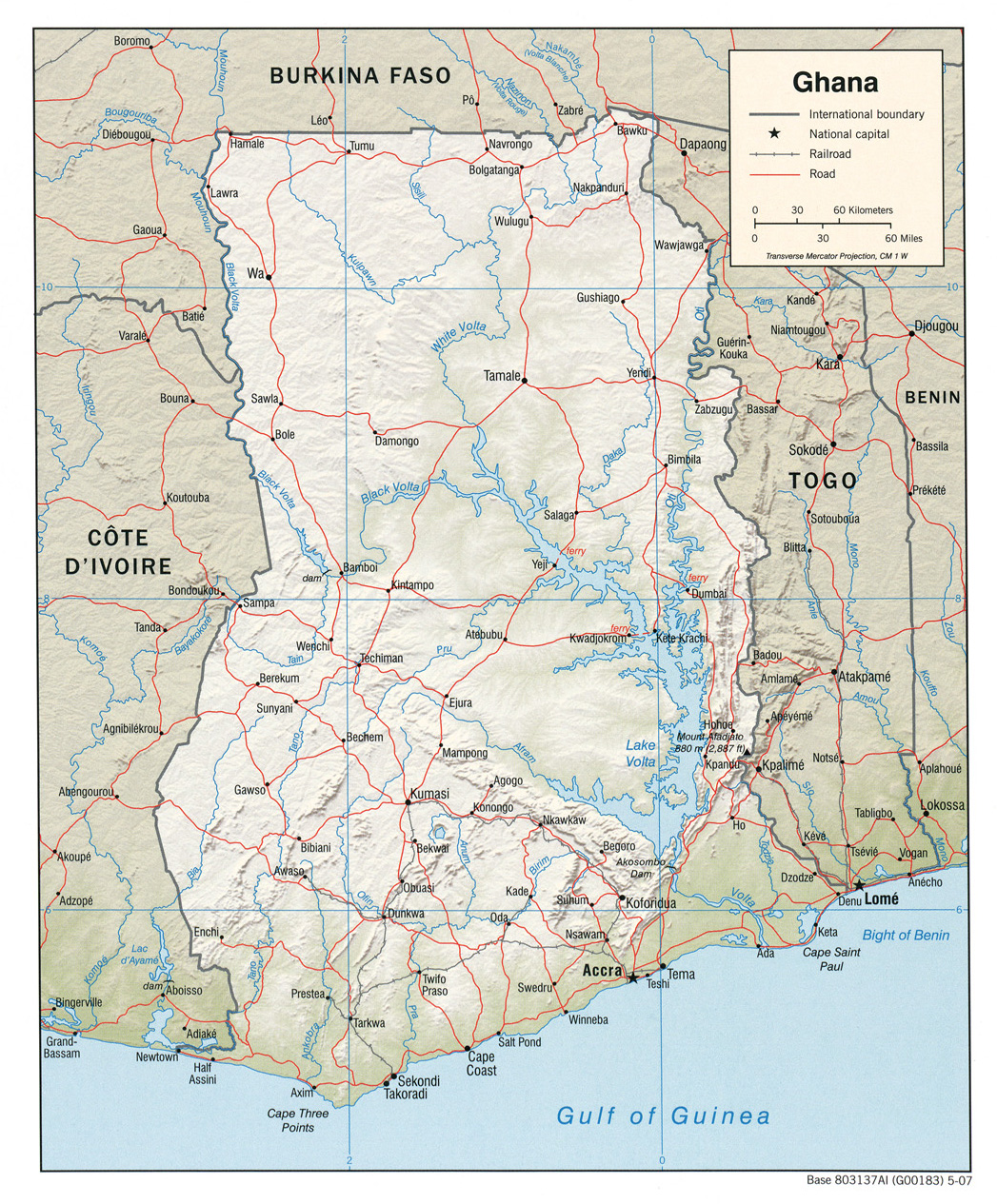
Map of Ghana, with Burkina Faso to the north

The Burkina Faso–Ghana border is 602 km (374 mi) in length and runs from the tripoint with Ivory Coast in the west to the tripoint with Togo in the east.

== Description ==
The border starts in the west at the tripoint with Ivory Coast on the Black Volta river; the border continues north along this river up to the 11th parallel north. The border then turns east, following this parallel until it reaches the Red Volta (though note that the border is not entirely straight in this sector, as at several points the boundary jogs north or south). The border follows the Red Volta briefly to the south-east, before turning to the north-east via a series of irregular overland lines. It then reaches the White Volta, following this river briefly, and then the Nouhao, before it turns to the south-east in a straight line down to the Togolese tripoint.

== History ==
Europeans had begun exploring the coast of Ghana (then referred to as the Gold Coast) from the 15th century, and it became the centre of a various trading networks, notably in gold and slaves; Germany, Sweden, Denmark, Portugal and the Netherlands all had trading posts here at one point. Britain also took an interest in the region, and during the 19th century became the predominant regional power, taking over all the rival trading posts and declaring the Gold Coast colony in 1867. The British gradually extended their rule into the interior, against often determined resistance by native kingdoms such as the Asante; the northern region of what is now Ghana was annexed to the Gold Coast colony in 1901.

The 1880s saw an intense competition between the European powers for territories in Africa, a process known as the Scramble for Africa. The process culminated in the Berlin Conference of 1884, in which the European nations concerned agreed upon their respective territorial claims and the rules of engagements going forward. As a result of this France had gained control the upper valley of the Niger River (roughly equivalent to the areas of modern Mali and Niger). France occupied this area in 1900; Mali (then referred to as French Sudan) was originally included, along with modern Niger and Burkina Faso (then referred to as Upper Volta, within the Upper Senegal and Niger colony and became a constituent of the federal colony of French West Africa (Afrique occidentale française, abbreviated AOF).

A border had been delimited between the Gold Coast and French territory by mutual agreement on 14 June 1898. A more precise border was then drawn up by an exchange of notes in 1904, and officially approved in 1906. The border was later demarcated on the ground via series of pillars. During the period 1932-47 the internal arrangements of French West Africa were altered: Upper Volta was abolished and its territory split out between French Sudan, Niger and Ivory Coast; as a result during this period the Ghana-Upper Volta was thereby abolished, becoming a continuance of the Ghana–Ivory Coast border.

The Gold Coast gained full independence from Britain (as Ghana) in 1957; France granted Upper Volta independence in 1960, and their mutual frontier became an international one between two sovereign states. The two states conducted some re-demarcation in the late 1960s-early 1970.

== Settlements near the border ==
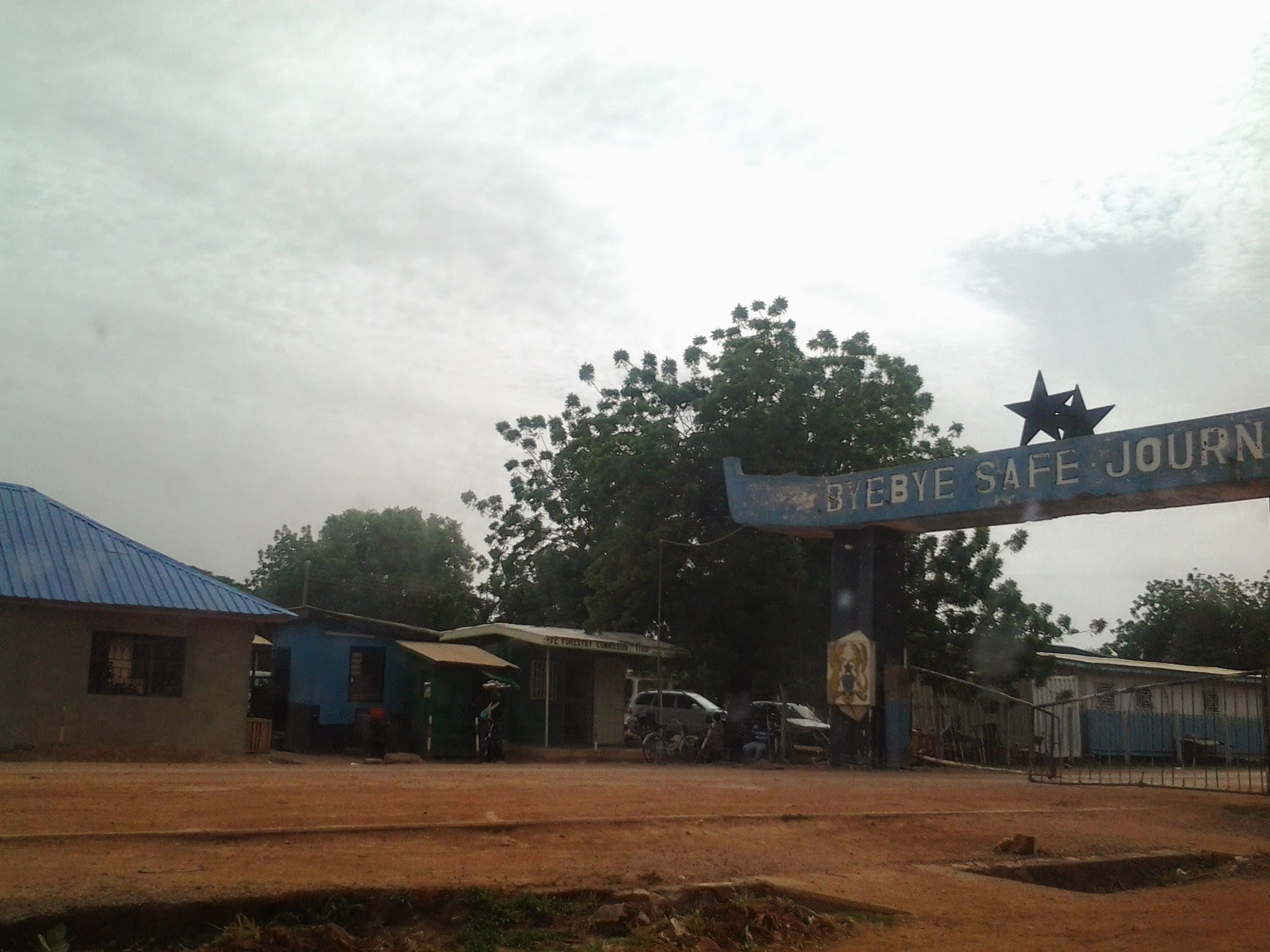
Border crossing

=== Burkina Faso ===
- Dankana
- Batie Nord
- Ouessa
- Boura
- Léo
- Bieha
- Songo
- Youga

=== Ghana ===
- Kalba
- Hamile
- Wechiau
- Kolingwu
- Tumu
- Kwonehogo
- Navrongo
- Gulen
- Bongo
- Nangodi
- Lamboya
- Bolgatanga
- Paga
- Mogoumnore
- Bawku

== Border crossings ==
The main border crossing is at Paga; lesser-used crossings are located at Tumu, Bawku and Hamile.

== See also ==
- Burkina Faso-Ghana relations
