= Dano, Burkina Faso =

Dano
- Town
- Location within Burkina Faso, West Africa
- Coordinates: 11°8′37″N 3°3′46″W
- Country: Burkina Faso
- Region: Sud-Ouest Region
- Province: Ioba Province
- Department: Dano Department
- Elevation: 287 m (942 ft)

Population (2019 census)
  - Total: 25,922
- Time zone: UTC+0 (GMT)

Dano is a town located in the province of Ioba in Burkina Faso. It is the capital of Ioba Province. It is also the capital of Dano Department.

Dano is a small town with a market for weaving and pottery and is home to the Dagara, whose traditional cosmology and ritual practices have persisted in spite of colonial Christian influences. These practices involve communing with elemental powers, channeling otherworldly beings, and performing divination with cowrie shells.

== Notable people ==
- Malidoma Patrice Somé Author and shaman
- Sobonfu Somé (author and speaker)
