= Beka (name) =

Beka (Georgian: ბექა) is a Georgian masculine name. Notable people with the name include:

- Beka I Jaqeli, Georgian ruling prince 1285-1306
- Beka II Jaqeli, Georgian ruling prince 1361-1391
- Beka III Jaqeli, Georgian ruling prince 1625-1635
- Beka Mikeltadze, Georgian footballer
- Beka Kavtaradze, Georgian water polo player
- Beka Kavtaradze, Georgian footballer
- Beka Burjanadze, Georgian basketball player
- Beka Gigashvili, Georgian rugby union player
- Beka Gviniashvili, Georgian judoka
- Beka Vachiberadze, Georgian footballer
- Beka Lomtadze, Georgian wrestler
- Beka Sheklashvili, Georgian rugby union player
- Beka Kakabadze, Georgian rugby union player
- Beka Tugushi, Georgian footballer
- Beka Gorgadze, Georgian rugby union player
- Beka Bitsadze, Georgian rugby union player
- Beka Gotsiridze, Georgian footballer
- Beka Saghinadze, Georgian rugby union player
- Beka Kurkhuli, Georgian writer
- Beka Tsiklauri, Georgian rugby union player
