= Youkouka =

Coordinates: 11°03′N 0°30′W

- Interactive map of Youkouka
- Country: Burkina Faso
- Region: Centre-Est Region
- Province: Boulgou Province
- Department: Zabré Department

Population (2019)
  - Total: 695

Youkouka is a village in the Zabré Department of Boulgou Province in south-eastern Burkina Faso.

Population
Year	Pop.	±%
1985	386	—
2006	499	+29.3%
2019	695	+39.3%
