= Guéguéré (department) =

- Department
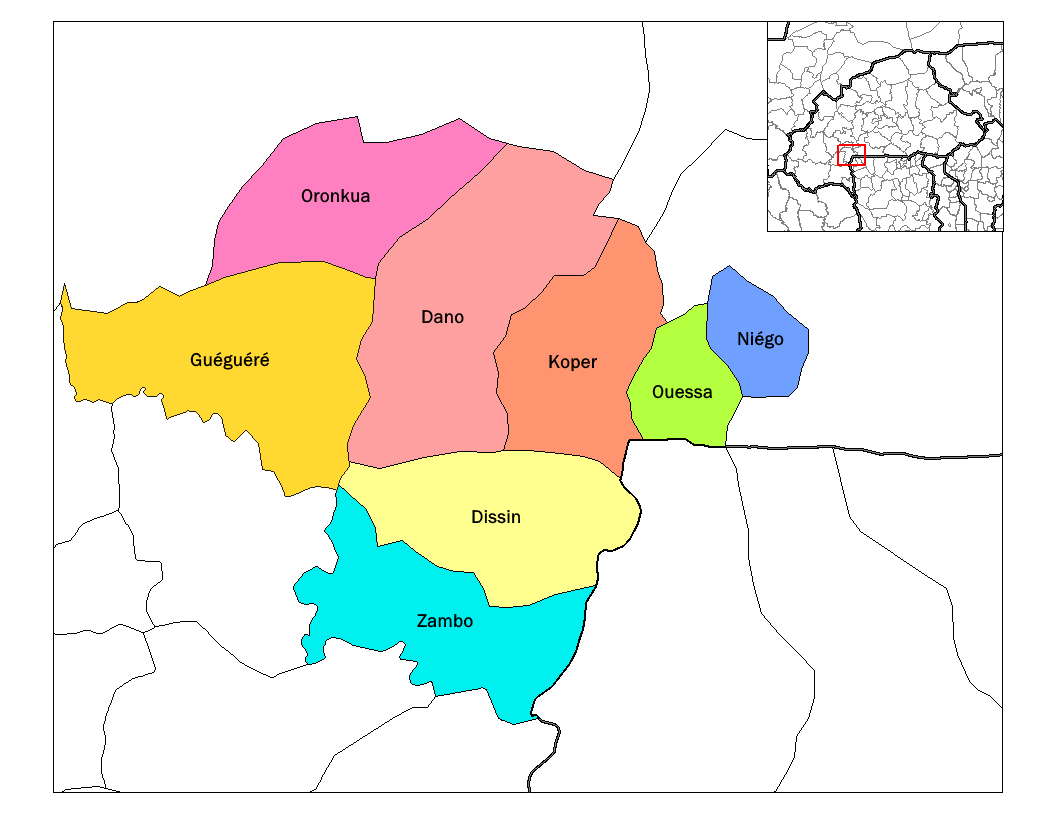
- Guéguéré Department location in the province
- Country: Burkina Faso
- Region: Sud-Ouest Region (Burkina Faso)
- Province: Ioba Province

Population (2012)
  - Total: 32,634
- Time zone: UTC+0 (GMT 0)

Guéguéré is a department or commune of Ioba Province in Burkina Faso.
