= Mangagou =

Coordinates: 11°08′N 0°34′W

Mangagou Mongagou
- Interactive map of Mangagou
- Country: Burkina Faso
- Region: Centre-Est Region
- Province: Boulgou Province
- Department: Zabré Department

Population (2019)
  - Total: 1,309

Mangagou is a town in the Zabré Department of Boulgou Province in south-eastern Burkina Faso.

Population
Year	Pop.	±%
1985	866	—
2006	953	+10.0%
2019	1,309	+37.4%
