= Gassougou =

- Interactive map of Gassougou
- Country: Burkina Faso
- Region: Centre-Est Region
- Province: Boulgou Province
- Department: Zabré Department

Population (2019)
  - Total: 5,694

Gassougou is a town in the Zabré Department of Boulgou Province in south-eastern Burkina Faso.

Population
Year	Pop.	±%
1985	2,908	—
2006	3,947	+35.7%
2019	5,694	+44.3%
