= Burkina Faso–Ghana relations =

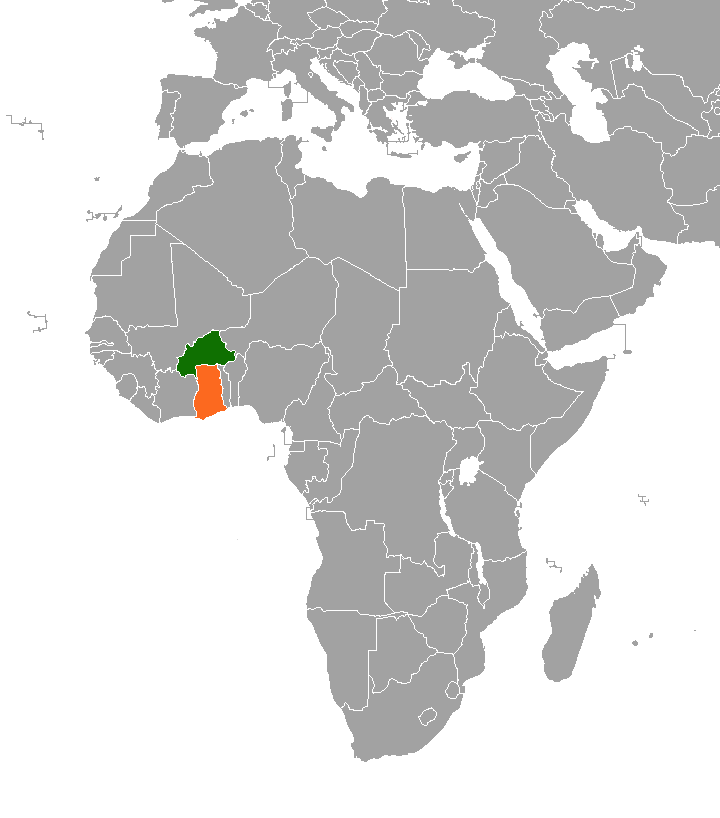
- Burkina Faso: Ghana

With the coming to power of Thomas Sankara in Burkina Faso in 1983, relations between Ghana and Burkina became both warm and close. Indeed, Jerry Rawlings and Sankara began discussions about uniting Ghana and Burkina in the manner of the defunct Ghana-Guinea-Mali Union, which Nkrumah had sought unsuccessfully to promote as a foundation for his dream of a unified continental government. Political and economic ties between Ghana and Burkina, a poorer country, were strengthened through joint commissions of cooperation and border demarcation committee meetings. Frequent high-level consultations and joint military exercises, meant to discourage potential dissidents and to protect young "revolutions" in each country, were fairly regular features of Ghana-Burkina relations.

== History ==
Ethnic ties between the people of far northern Ghana (notably the Mossi) and Burkina, divided by artificial borders inherited from colonial rule, grew stronger as easy border crossings and free exchange of goods and services contributed to marked improvements in the material and the social welfare of peoples on both sides of the border. The Ghanaian Provisional National Defence Council, for example, established road, air, and telecommunications links between Ghana and Burkina.

Ghana's warm relations with Burkina received a serious but temporary setback with the assassination of Sankara in October 1987. His successor, Blaise Campaore, was widely believed to have been responsible for the assassination. As a result, relations between Ghana and Burkina cooled. Rawlings and Campaore met briefly for the first time in early 1988 in Tamale, the capital of Ghana's Northern Region, to discuss Ghana-Burkina relations.

The outbreak of civil war in Liberia in 1989 found the two countries on opposite sides of the conflict. Ghana, at great financial and human cost, immediately repatriated about 10,000 Ghanaians living in Liberia and, beginning in mid-1990, contributed a contingent to a multi-national peace-keeping force second in size only to one sent by Nigeria. From 1990 to 1993, Campaore's role in the Liberian conflict was at odds with an ECOWAS peace initiative spearheaded by Ghana and Nigeria, because Burkina was believed to be supplying arms to Charles Taylor's forces, long regarded as the main obstacle to peace. In 1994 relations between Burkina and Ghana showed signs of warming at a time when Campaore appeared to be reassessing his policies in Liberia and toward Ghana and Nigeria.

In 2015, Ghana, Burkina Faso, and Togo signed a pact to increase relations between the three neighboring countries. The three nations agreed to ease movement between them to work together on issues of education, health, and agriculture. The agreement also calls for the discouraging of forced marriages within all three countries, as well as tackling petroleum smuggling operations and other cross-border criminal activities that have hurt the sister countries.

As of 2016, Burkina Faso trades at a deficit with Ghana. The former exports goods valued at $58,978,640 to Ghana, while importing $161,428,465 worth of goods.

== See also ==
- Foreign relations of Burkina Faso
- Foreign relations of Ghana
