= Wangala, Burkina Faso =

Wangala
- Country: Burkina Faso
- Region: Centre-Est Region
- Province: Boulgou Province
- Department: Zabré Department

Population (2019)
  - Total: 3,325

Wangala is a town in the Zabré Department of Boulgou Province in south-eastern Burkina Faso.

Population
Year	Pop.	±%
1985	2,051	—
2006	2,571	+25.4%
2019	3,325	+29.3%
