= Zourma =

- Country: Burkina Faso
- Region: Centre-Est Region
- Province: Boulgou Province
- Department: Zabré Department

Population (2019)
  - Total: 7,187

Zourma is a town in the Zabré Department of Boulgou Province in south-eastern Burkina Faso.

Population
Year	Pop.	±%
2006	4,907	—
2019	7,187	+46.5%
