= Dissin Department =

Coordinates: 10°56′00″N 2°56′00″W

Dissin
- Department
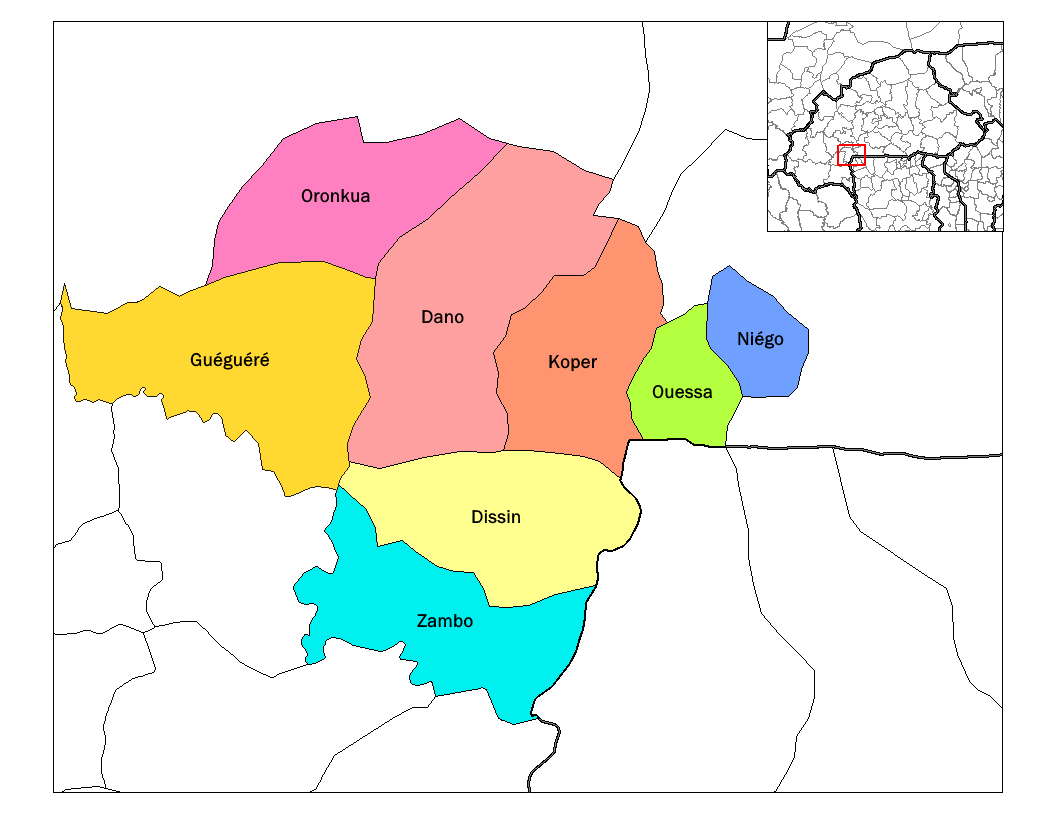
- Dissin Department location in the province
- Country: Burkina Faso
- Province: Ioba Province
- Time zone: UTC+0 (GMT 0)

Dissin is a department or commune of Ioba Province in south-eastern Burkina Faso. Its capital lies at the town of Dissin.

== Towns and villages ==
- Dissin
