= Oronkua Department =

Coordinates: 11.2833°N 3.1000°W

Oronkua
- Department
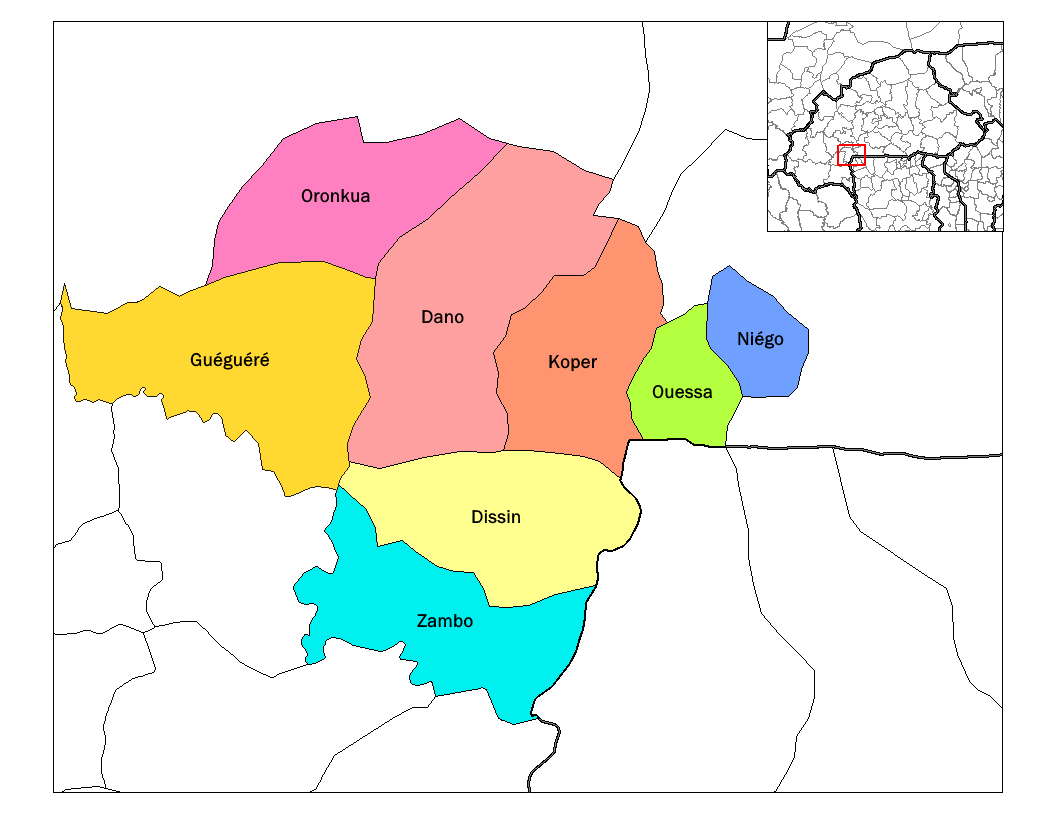
- Oronkua Department location in the province
- Country: Burkina Faso
- Province: Ioba Province

Area
  - Total: 150.3 sq mi (389.2 km^{2})

Population (2019 census)
  - Total: 30,692
  - Density: 204.2/sq mi (78.86/km^{2})
- Time zone: UTC+0 (GMT 0)

Oronkua is a department or commune of Ioba Province in south-eastern Burkina Faso. Its capital lies at the town of Oronkua.

== Towns and villages ==
- Oronkua
