= Bougre De Youga =

Bougre De Youga Bougoure De Youga
- Country: Burkina Faso
- Region: Centre-Est Region
- Province: Boulgou Province
- Department: Zabré Department

Population (2019)
  - Total: 767

Bougre De Youga is a village in the Zabré Department of Boulgou Province in south-eastern Burkina Faso.

Population
Year	Pop.	±%
1985	1,646	—
2006	358	−78.3%
2019	767	+114.2%
