= Niégo Department =

Coordinates: 11.1167°N 2.7000°W

Niégo
- Department
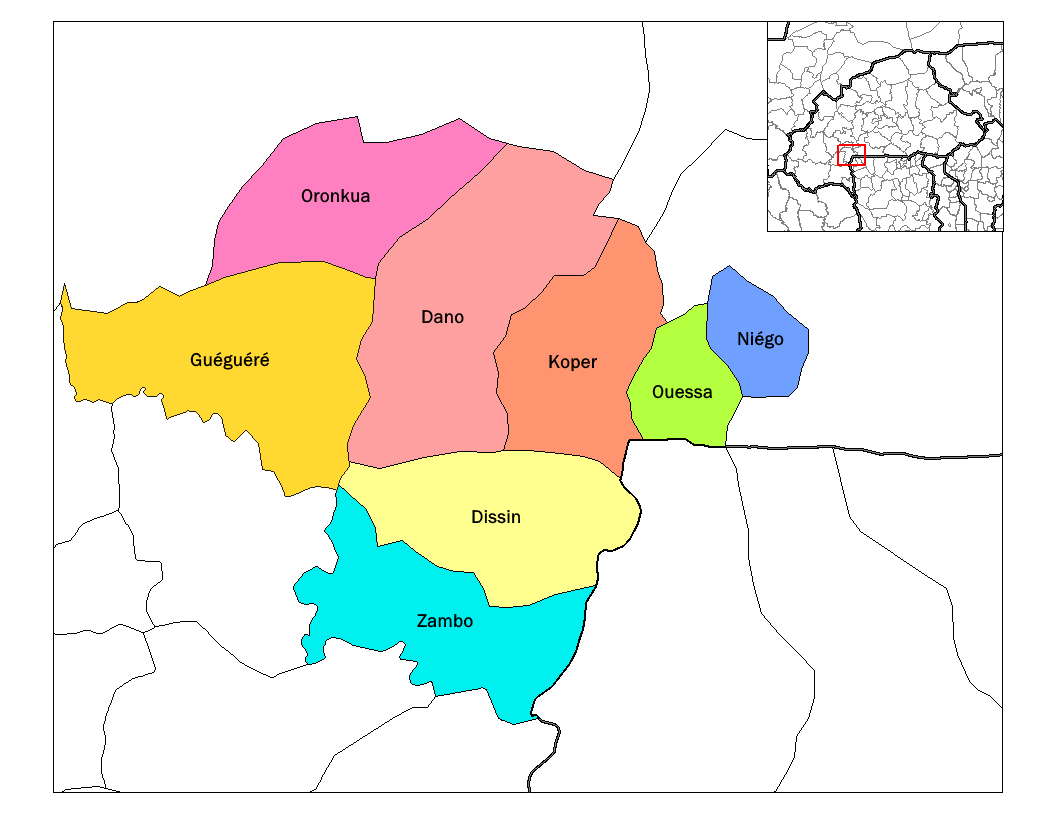
- Niégo Department location in the province
- Country: Burkina Faso
- Province: Ioba Province
- Time zone: UTC+0 (GMT 0)

Niégo is a department or commune of Ioba Province in south-eastern Burkina Faso. Its capital lies at the town of Niego.

== Towns and villages ==
- Niego
