= Sangou, Burkina Faso =

Coordinates: 11.1667°N 0.6000°W

Sangou
- Interactive map of Sangou
- Country: Burkina Faso
- Region: Centre-Est Region
- Province: Boulgou Province
- Department: Zabré Department

Population (2019)
  - Total: 2,317

Sangou is a town in the Zabré Department of Boulgou Province in south-eastern Burkina Faso.

Population
Year	Pop.	±%
1985	1,702	—
2006	2,871	+68.7%
2019	2,317	−19.3%
