= Wanda, Burkina Faso =

Coordinates: 11.1167°N 0.5667°W

Wanda
- Interactive map of Wanda
- Country: Burkina Faso
- Region: Centre-Est Region
- Province: Boulgou Province
- Department: Zabré Department

Population (2019)
  - Total: 1,926

Wanda is a town in the Zabré Department of Boulgou Province in south-eastern Burkina Faso.

Population
Year	Pop.	±%
1985	1,110	—
2006	1,490	+34.2%
2019	1,926	+29.3%
