= Zambo Department =

Coordinates: 10°49′N 3°00′W

Zambo
- Department
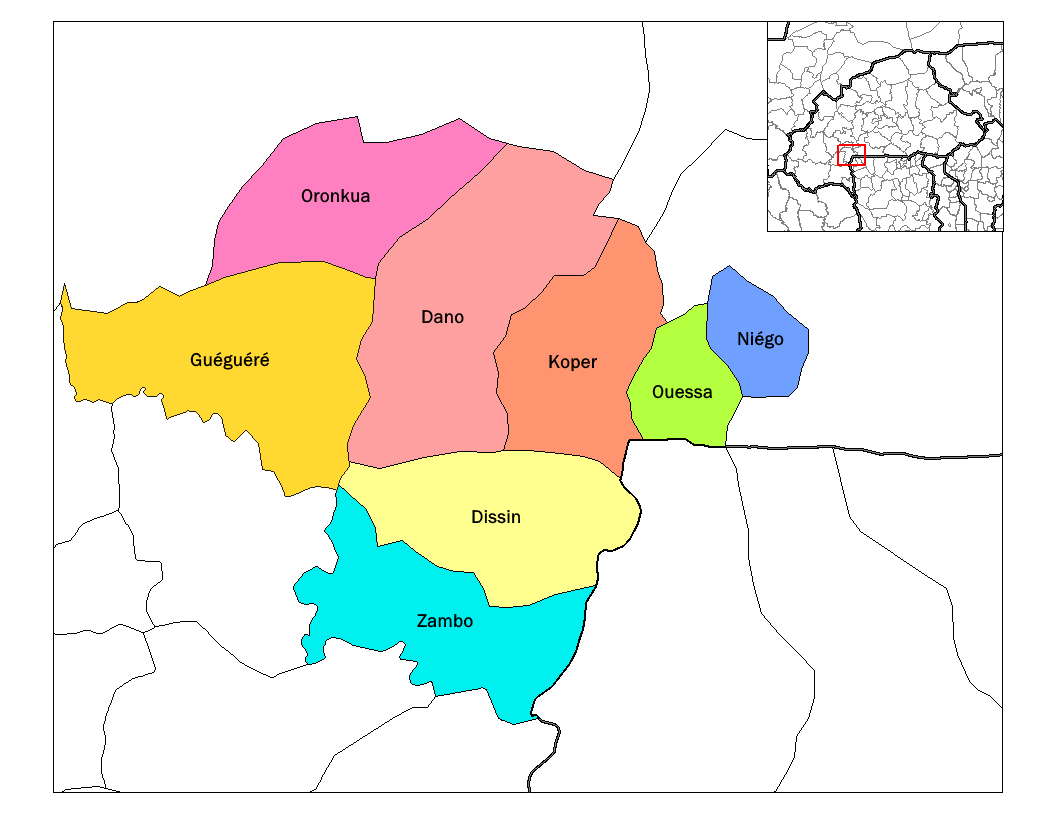
- Zambo Department location in the province
- Country: Burkina Faso
- Province: Ioba Province
- Time zone: UTC+0 (GMT 0)

Zambo is a department or commune of Ioba Province in south-eastern Burkina Faso. Its capital lies at the town of Zambo.

== Towns and villages ==
- Zambo
