= Youngou-Peulh =

- Country: Burkina Faso
- Region: Centre-Est Region
- Province: Boulgou Province
- Department: Zabré Department

Population (2019)
  - Total: 190

Youngou-Peulh is a village in the Zabré Department of Boulgou Province in south-eastern Burkina Faso.

Population
Year	Pop.	±%
2006	246	—
2019	190	−22.8%
