= Guirmogo =

- Country: Burkina Faso
- Region: Centre-Est Region
- Province: Boulgou Province
- Department: Zabré Department

Population (2019)
  - Total: 3,534

Guirmogo is a town in the Zabré Department of Boulgou Province in south-eastern Burkina Faso.

Population
Year	Pop.	±%
1985	1,172	—
2006	2,570	+119.3%
2019	3,534	+37.5%
