= Songo, Burkina Faso =

Town in Centre-Est Region, Burkina Faso

Coordinates: 11.0333°N 0.4500°W

Songo
- Interactive map of Songo
- Country: Burkina Faso
- Region: Centre-Est Region
- Province: Boulgou Province
- Department: Zabré Department

Population (2019)
  - Total: 2,826

Songo is a town in the Zabré Department of Boulgou Province in south-eastern Burkina Faso, located close to the border with Ghana.

Population
Year	Pop.	±%
1985	1,010	—
2006	1,526	+51.1%
2019	2,826	+85.2%
