= Yoroko =

Coordinates: 11.2333°N 0.5500°W

- Interactive map of Yoroko
- Country: Burkina Faso
- Region: Centre-Est Region
- Province: Boulgou Province
- Department: Zabré Department

Population (2019)
  - Total: 4,191

Yoroko is a town in the Zabré Department of Boulgou Province in south-eastern Burkina Faso.

Population
| Year | Pop. | ±% |
|---|---|---|
| 1985 | 1,538 | — |
| 2006 | 2,229 | +44.9% |
| 2019 | 4,191 | +88.0% |
