= Doun =

Coordinates: 11.1500°N 0.5667°W

- Interactive map of Doun
- Country: Burkina Faso
- Region: Centre-Est Region
- Province: Boulgou Province
- Department: Zabré Department

Population (2019)
  - Total: 2,150

Doun is a town in the Zabré Department of Boulgou Province in south-eastern Burkina Faso.

Population
Year	Pop.	±%
1985	1,252	—
2006	1,325	+5.8%
2019	2,150	+62.3%
