= Dano Department =

Coordinates: 11°08′26″N 3°03′50″W

Dano
- Department
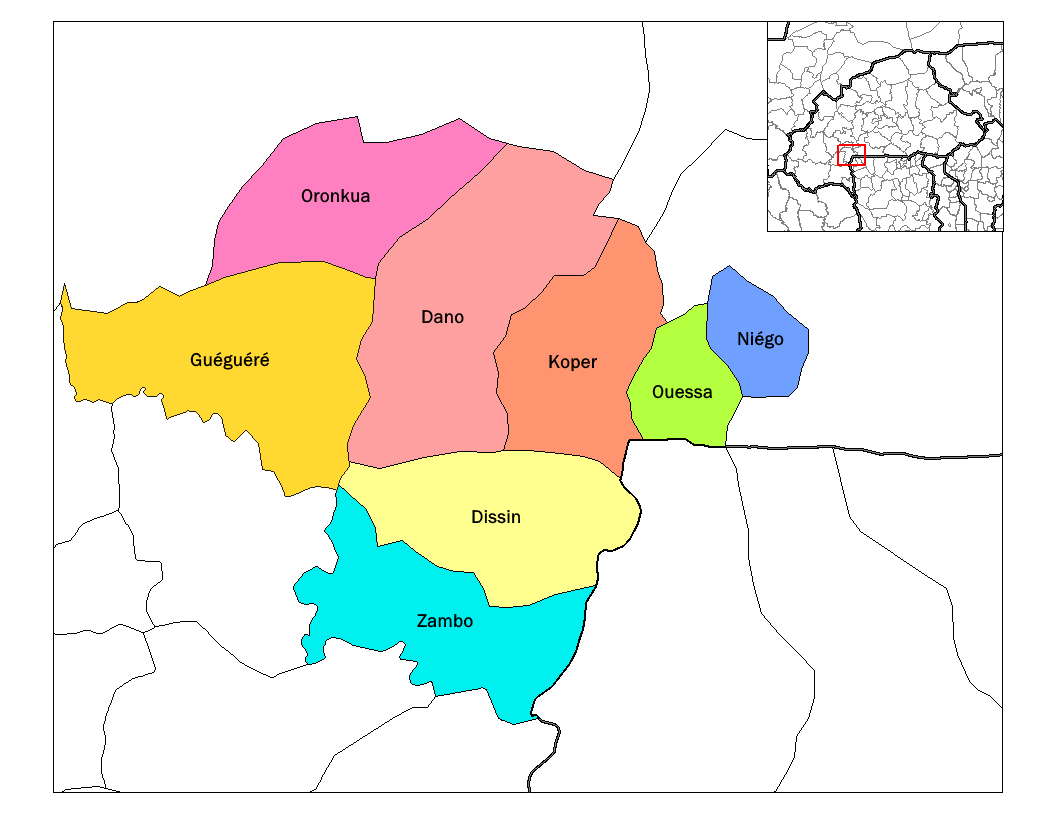
- Dano Department location in the province
- Country: Burkina Faso
- Province: Ioba Province

Area
  - Land: 252 sq mi (652 km^{2})

Population (2019 census)
  - Department: 64,232
  - Density: 255/sq mi (98.5/km^{2})
  - Urban: 25,922
- Time zone: UTC+0 (GMT 0)

Dano is a department or commune of Ioba Province in south-eastern Burkina Faso. Its capital is the town of Dano.

== Towns and villages ==
- Dano
