= Koper Department =

Coordinates: 11°04′N 2°54′W

Koper
- Department
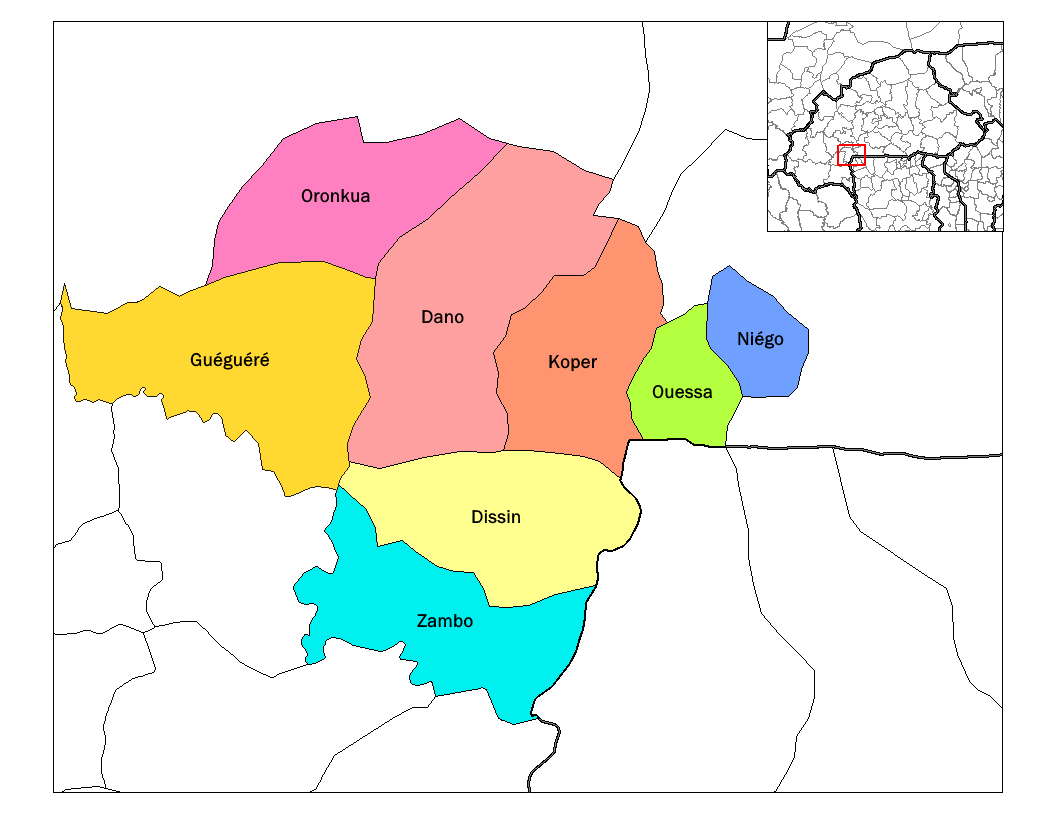
- Koper Department location in the province
- Country: Burkina Faso
- Province: Ioba Province

Area
  - Total: 163.3 sq mi (422.9 km^{2})

Population (2019 census)
  - Total: 28,651
  - Density: 175.5/sq mi (67.75/km^{2})
- Time zone: UTC+0 (GMT 0)

Koper is a department or commune of Ioba Province in south-eastern Burkina Faso. Its capital lies at the town of Koper.

== Towns and villages ==
- Koper
