= Bassintare =

Bassintare Bassentare
- Country: Burkina Faso
- Region: Centre-Est Region
- Province: Boulgou Province
- Department: Zabré Department

Population (2019)
  - Total: 75

Bassintare is a village in the Zabré Department of Boulgou Province in south-eastern Burkina Faso.

Population
Year	Pop.	±%
1985	95	—
2006	42	−55.8%
2019	75	+78.6%
