= Bougreboko =

Bougreboko Bourboko
- Country: Burkina Faso
- Region: Centre-Est Region
- Province: Boulgou Province
- Department: Zabré Department

Population (2019)
  - Total: 2,030

Bougreboko is a town in the Zabré Department of Boulgou Province in the southeastern portion of Burkina Faso.

Population
Year	Pop.	±%
1985	1,269	—
2006	1,336	+5.3%
2019	2,030	+51.9%
