= Youngou =

Coordinates: 11°07′N 0°35′W

- Interactive map of Youngou
- Country: Burkina Faso
- Region: Centre-Est Region
- Province: Boulgou Province
- Department: Zabré Department

Population (2019)
  - Total: 5,108

Youngou is a town in the Zabré Department of Boulgou Province in south-eastern Burkina Faso.

Population
Year	Pop.	±%
1985	3,478	—
2006	3,595	+3.4%
2019	5,108	+42.1%
