= Moende =

- Country: Burkina Faso
- Region: Centre-Est Region
- Province: Boulgou Province
- Department: Zabré Department

Population (2019)
  - Total: 1,118

Moende is a village in the Zabré Department of Boulgou Province in south-eastern Burkina Faso.

Population
| Year | Pop. | ±% |
|---|---|---|
| 1985 | 496 | — |
| 2006 | 656 | +32.3% |
| 2019 | 1,118 | +70.4% |
