= Sobonfu Somé =

Author and wife of Malidoma Somé

- Born: Dano, Burkina Faso
- Died: January 14, 2017
- Occupation(s): Author, speaker, activist
- Notable work: The Spirit of Intimacy, Welcoming Spirit Home, Falling Out of Grace
- Website: wisdomspring.org

Sobonfu Somé (d. January 14, 2017) was a Burkinabe teacher and writer, specializing in topics of spirituality. She wrote three books: her first, The Spirit of Intimacy, looks at relationships and intimacy through the lens of African spirituality and teachings.

She founded the organization Wisdom Spring to teach African spirituality to westerners and to provide drinking water to villages in West Africa.

== Naming ==
Sobonfu Somé wrote about African culture, with a focus on her and her husband's interpretations of Dagara spiritual traditions for use by Westerners. One story she relayed was that, in a naming ceremony, her mother had been placed in a trance-like state in which she and the elders of the community divined Sobonfu's life purpose. She said the elders then gave her, the unborn child, the name Sobonfu, meaning "Keeper of Ritual", based upon this experience.

== Marriage ==
Sobonfu was married to Malidoma Patrice Somé in an arranged marriage. The couple moved to London, and later the United States.

== Death ==
Somé died from a weakened immune system attributed to water contamination.

== Works ==
- The Spirit of Intimacy: Ancient Teachings in the Ways of Relationships. New York, NY: Quill, 2002. ISBN 0688175791
- Welcoming Spirit Home: Ancient African Teachings to Celebrate Children and Community. Novato, CA: New World Library. ISBN 1577310098
- Falling Out of Grace: Meditations on Loss, Healing and Wisdom. El Sobrante, CA: North Bay Books. Arms, S. (2002). ISBN 0972520023.
- Women's Wisdom from the Heart of Africa. Louisville, CO: Sounds True, 2004. ISBN 1591791618
