= Wilgo =

Wilgo Wilogo
- Country: Burkina Faso
- Region: Centre-Est Region
- Province: Boulgou Province
- Department: Zabré Department

Population (2019)
  - Total: 1,394

Wilgo is a town in the Zabré Department of Boulgou Province in south-eastern Burkina Faso.

Population
Year	Pop.	±%
1985	912	—
2006	979	+7.3%
2019	1,394	+42.4%
