= Ouessa Department =

Coordinates: 11.0500°N 2.7833°W

Ouessa
- Department
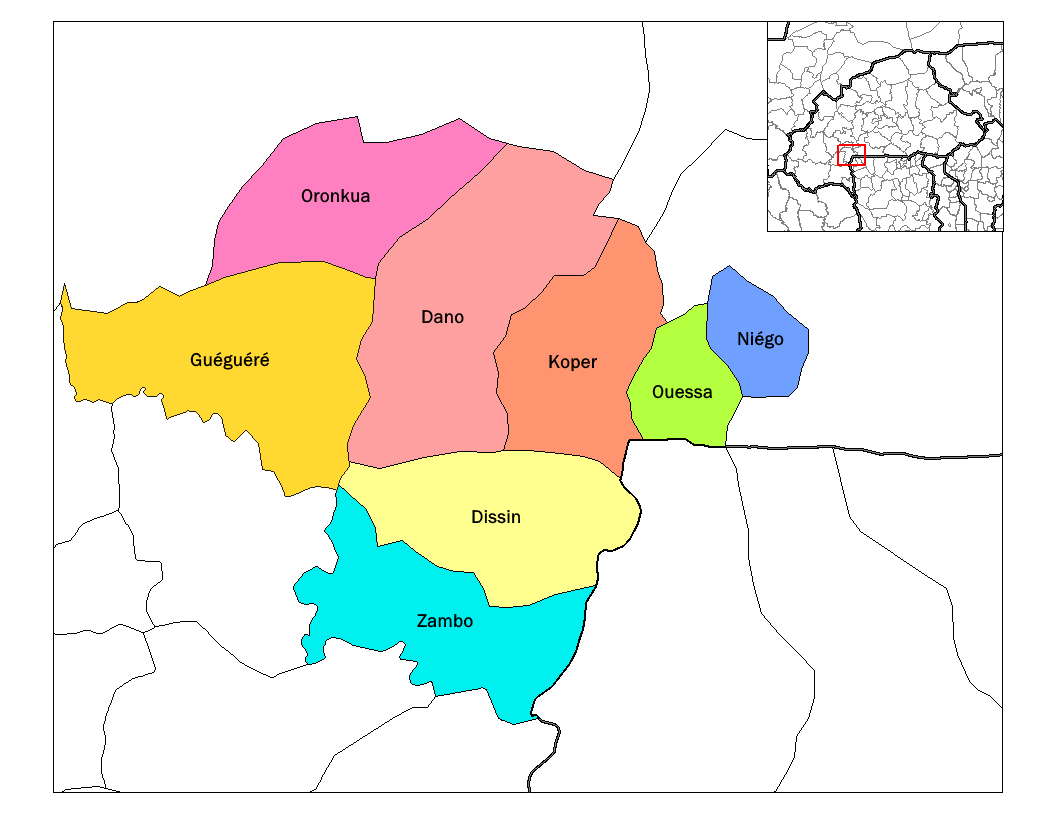
- Ouessa Department location in the province
- Country: Burkina Faso
- Province: Ioba Province
- Time zone: UTC+0 (GMT 0)

Ouessa is a department or commune of Ioba Province in south-eastern Burkina Faso. Its capital lies at the town of Ouessa. It shares a border with Ghana to the south.

== Towns and villages ==
- Ouessa
