= Gon, Burkina Faso =

Coordinates: 11.2000°N 0.6500°W

Gon
- Interactive map of Gon
- Country: Burkina Faso
- Region: Centre-Est Region
- Province: Boulgou Province
- Department: Zabré Department

Population (2019)
  - Total: 1,227

Gon, Burkina Faso is a village in the Zabré Department of Boulgou Province in south-eastern Burkina Faso.

Population
Year	Pop.	±%
1985	501	—
2006	911	+81.8%
2019	1,227	+34.7%
