= Yokouma =

- Village
- Country: Burkina Faso
- Region: Centre-Est Region
- Province: Boulgou Province
- Department: Zabré Department

Population (2019)
  - Total: 57

Yokouma is a village in the Zabré Department of Boulgou Province in south-eastern Burkina Faso.

During the 2012 elections the village had 63 registered voters. A shed in the village was used as the voting station.

"Yokouma" means "Solidarity" in the Bissa language.

Population
Year	Pop.	±%
2005 (est.)	139	—
2019	57	−59.0%
