= Ouessa =

- Location within Burkina Faso, West Africa
- Coordinates: 11.038255°N 2.779541°W
- Country: Burkina Faso

Population (2008)
  - Total: 2,175
- Time zone: UTC+0 (GMT)

Ouessa is a town in southern Burkina Faso, very close to the border of Ghana. Across the border is the town of Hamile. It is the capital of Ouessa Department.
