= Youga (surname) =

Youga is a surname. Notable people with the surname include:

- Amos Youga (born 1992), Central African footballer, brother of Kelly
- Kelly Youga (born 1985), Central African footballer
