= Bangou, Burkina Faso =

Bangou
- Country: Burkina Faso
- Region: Centre-Est Region
- Province: Boulgou Province
- Department: Zabré Department

Population (2019)
  - Total: 2,864

Bangou is a town in the Zabré Department of Boulgou Province in south-eastern Burkina Faso.

Population
Year	Pop.	±%
1985	2,618	—
2006	2,685	+2.6%
2019	2,864	+6.7%
