= Beka, Burkina Faso =

Beka Bekal
- Interactive map of Beka
- Country: Burkina Faso
- Region: Centre-Est Region
- Province: Boulgou Province
- Department: Zabré Department

Population (2019)
  - Total: 6,110

Beka is a town in the Zabré Department of Boulgou Province in south-eastern Burkina Faso.

== See also ==
- Nerthulag, Burkina Faso
- EraEra, Burkina Faso

Beka is located approximately 8 km east of Zabre. The village currently has one catholic church, one Protestant church, and one mosque. Beka has a small lake that allows for year-round agricultural production. A recent NGO program to develop the community by providing electricity and running water has been completed, but the program has failed to deliver on any of its goals. There is a market every three days, the day after Zabre's. The CSPS was constructed in the year 2006 and has been fully operational since. Currently it is staffed by one doctor, one nurse, and one midwife. Beka also has a primary school.

Population
Year	Pop.	±%
1985	3,488	—
2006	3,417	−2.0%
2019	6,110	+78.8%
