= Ioba Province =

Coordinates: 11°05′N 3°05′W

Ioba
- Province
- Location in Burkina Faso

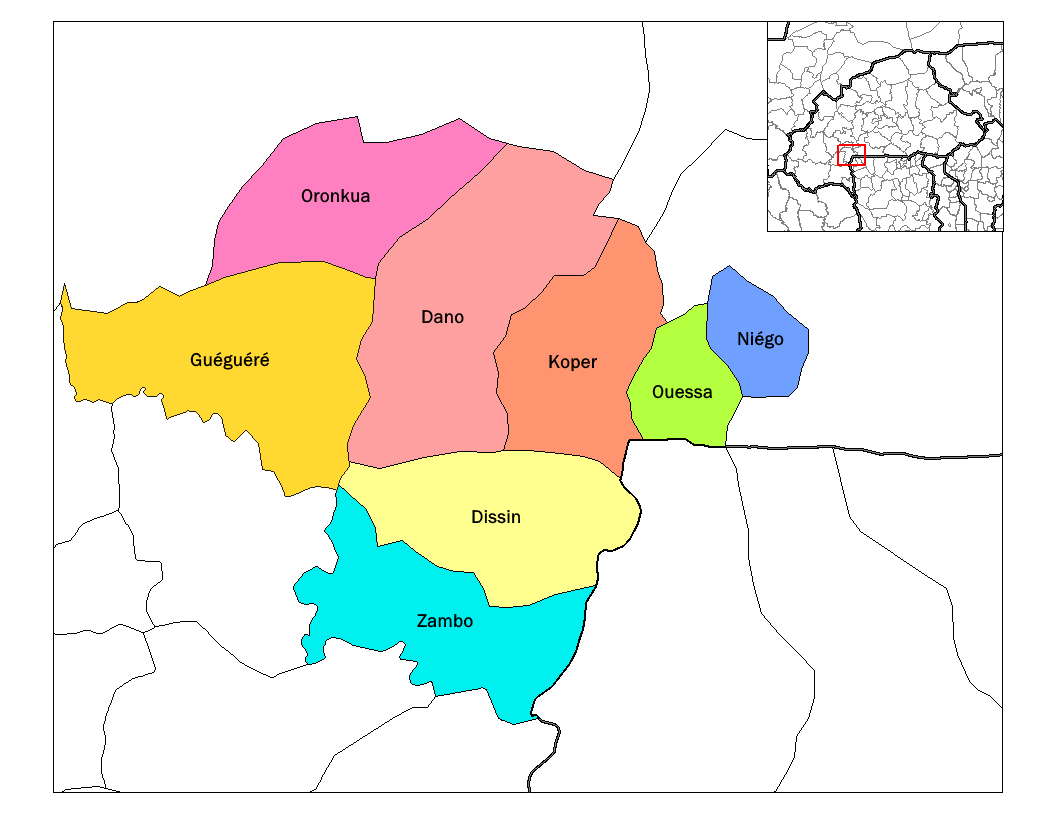
- Provincial map of its departments
- Country: Burkina Faso
- Region: Sud-Ouest Region
- Capital: Dano

Area
  - Province: 3,251 km^{2} (1,255 sq mi)

Population (2019 census)
  - Province: 265,876
  - Density: 81.78/km^{2} (211.8/sq mi)
  - Urban: 25,922
- Time zone: UTC+0 (GMT 0)

Ioba is one of the 45 provinces of Burkina Faso, located in its Sud-Ouest Region. In 2019 the population was 265,876. The capital of Ioba is Dano.

== Departments ==
Ioba is divided into 8 departments:

- Dano
- Dissin
- Guéguéré
- Koper
- Niégo
- Oronkua
- Ouessa
- Zambo

== See also ==
- Regions of Burkina Faso
- Provinces of Burkina Faso
- Departments of Burkina Faso
