= Red Volta =

River in Burkina Faso and Ghana

Red Volta Volta rouge
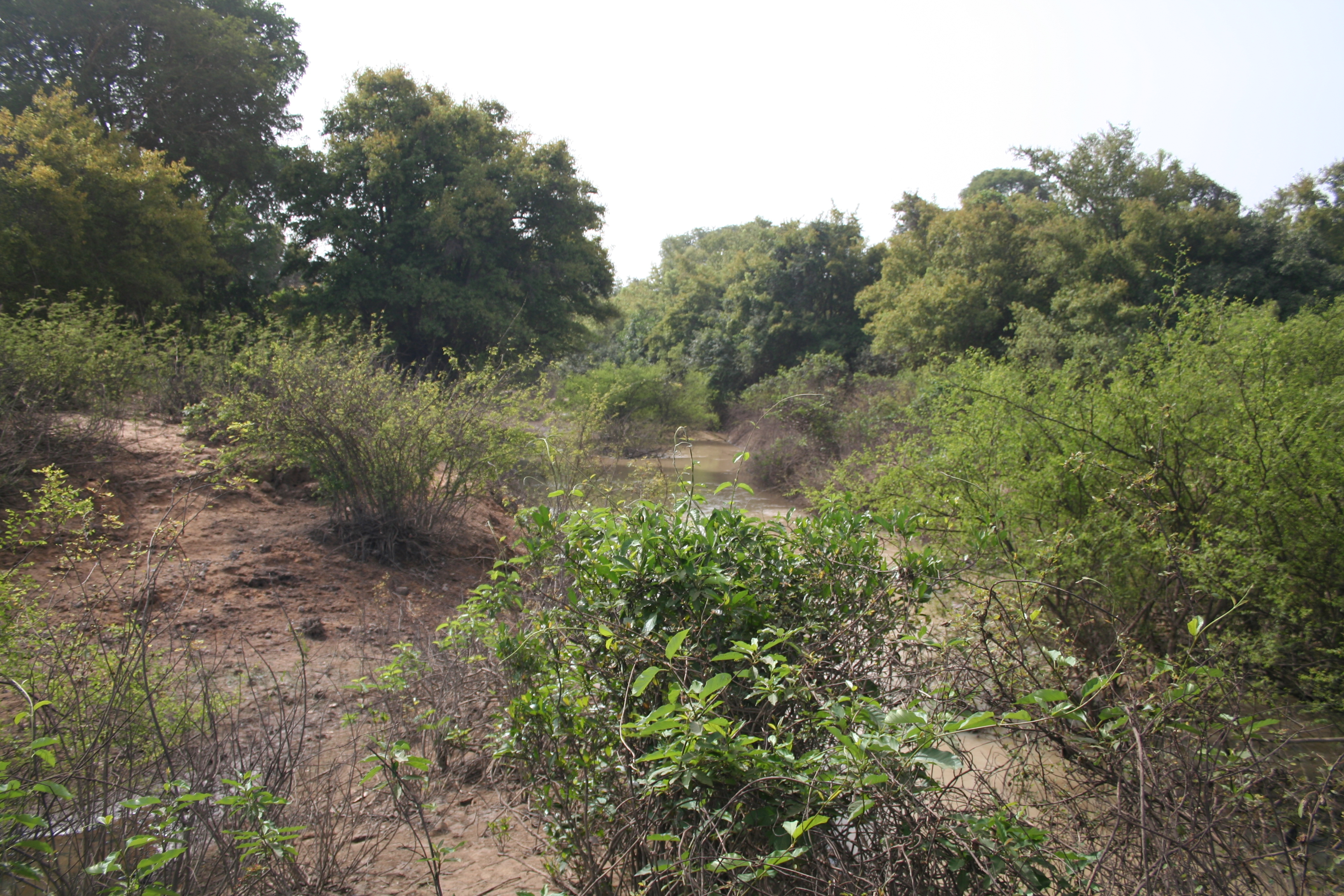

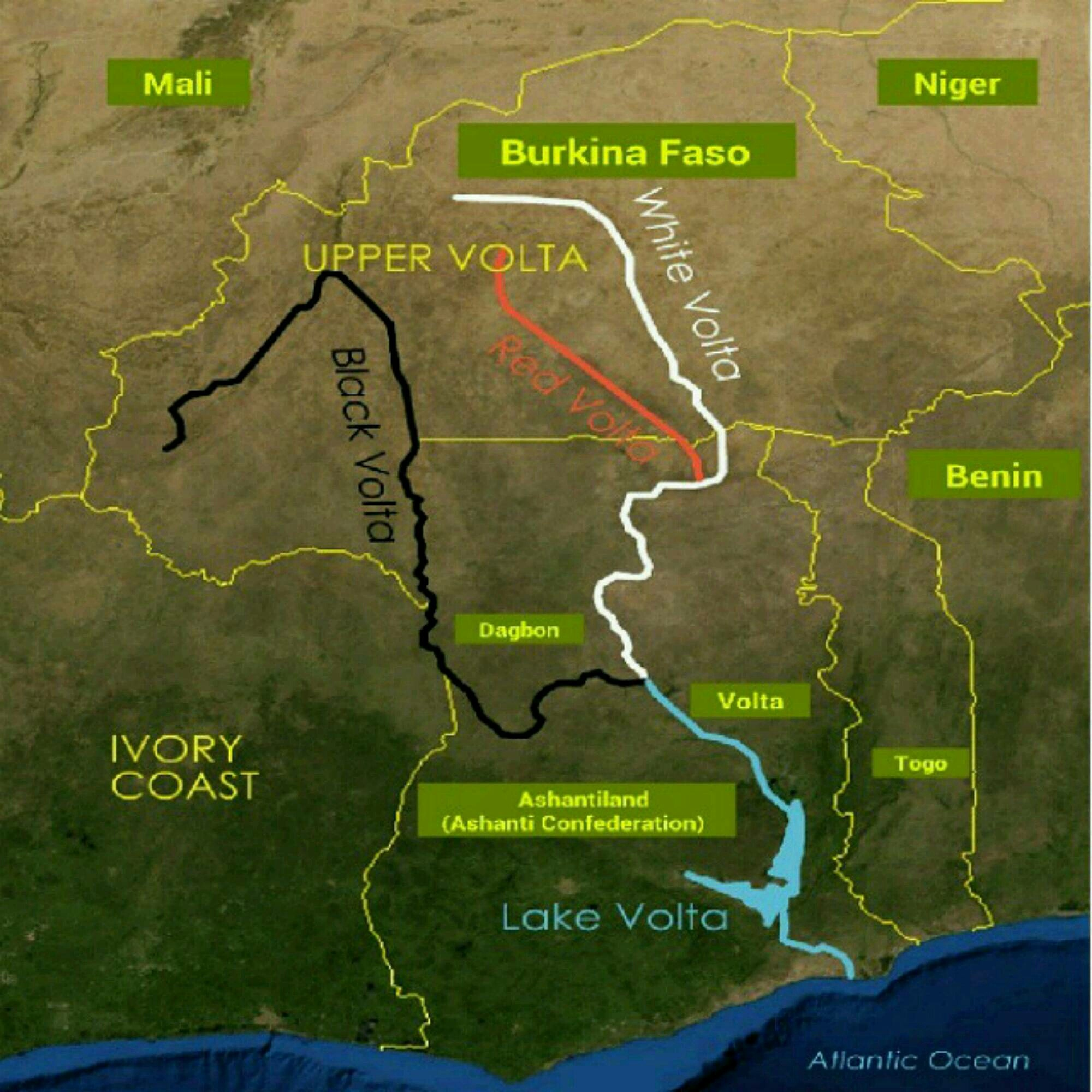
- Red Volta shown in red

Location
- Countries: Burkina Faso and Ghana

Physical characteristics
- Mouth: Volta River
  - location: Lake Volta
  - coordinates: 10°34′00″N 00°30′00″W
- Length: 320 km (200 mi)
- Basin size: 73,000 km^{2} (28,000 sq mi)
- Discharge
  - location: Mouth

Basin features
- Tributaries
  - left: White Volta
  - right: White Volta

The Red Volta or Nazinon (French: Volta rouge) is a waterway located in West Africa. It emerges near Ouagadougou in Burkina Faso and has a length of about 320 km at the end of which it joins the White Volta in Ghana.

The river is primarily located in Burkina Faso and forms part of the international border between Burkina Faso and Ghana. It flows into Ghana's Upper East region and empties into the White Volta.
