= Youga =

- Village
- Location in Burkina Faso
- Coordinates: 11°03′N 0°27′W
- Country: Burkina Faso
- Region: Centre-Est Region
- Province: Boulgou Province
- Department: Zabré Department

Government

Population (2019)
  - Total: 2,776
- Time zone: UTC

Youga is a village in the Zabré Department of Boulgou Province in south-eastern Burkina Faso, about 2 km north from the Burkina Faso–Ghana border. As of 2019 there was a gold mine in Youga operated by a Turkish subcontractor

Population
Year	Pop.	±%
1985	917	—
2006	1,153	+25.7%
2019	2,776	+140.8%
