= Zabré Department =

Zabré
- Department
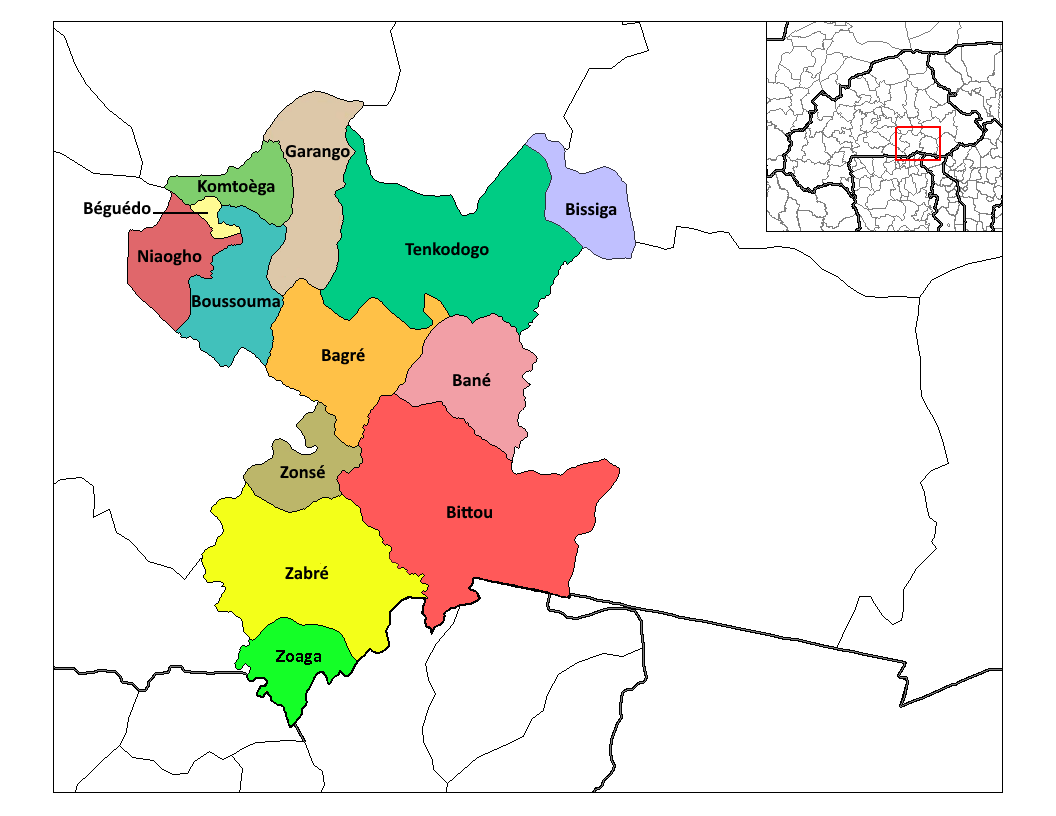
- Zabré Department location in the province
- Coordinates: 11.1833°N 0.6333°W
- Country: Burkina Faso
- Province: Boulgou Province

Area
  - Total: 885 km^{2} (342 sq mi)

Population (2019 census)
  - Total: 119,320
  - Density: 135/km^{2} (349/sq mi)
- Time zone: UTC+0 (GMT 0)

Zabré is a department or commune of Boulgou Province in eastern Burkina Faso. Its capital is the town of Zabré. According to the 2019 census the department has a total population of 119,320.

== Towns and villages ==
- Zabré (13 599 inhabitants) (capital)
- Bangou (2 130 inhabitants)
- Barganse Peulh (353 inhabitants)
- Barganse (93 inhabitants)
- Bassintare (152 inhabitants)
- Beka Zourma (559 inhabitants)
- Beka (3 579 inhabitants)
- Benya Kipala (1 445 inhabitants)
- Benya-Peulh (369 inhabitants)
- Bissaya (4 720 inhabitants)
- Bougre De Youga (460 inhabitants)
- Bougreboko (1 360 inhabitants)
- Bourma (956 inhabitants)
- Doun (1 538 inhabitants)
- Gassougou (3 671 inhabitants)
- Gon (810 inhabitants)
- Gonse (313 inhabitants)
- Gourgou-Samandi (251 inhabitants)
- Guirmogo (2 290 inhabitants)
- Mangagou (1 030 inhabitants)
- Moende (750 inhabitants)
- Sambaregou (619 inhabitants)
- Sampema (8 284 inhabitants)
- Sangou (2 954 inhabitants)
- Sig-Noghin (429 inhabitants)
- Sihoun (409 inhabitants)
- Songo (1 003 inhabitants)
- Soussoula (3 087 inhabitants)
- Toubissa (1 109 inhabitants)
- Wanda (1 389 inhabitants)
- Wangala (2 506 inhabitants)
- Wilgo (1 151 inhabitants)
- Yokouma (139 inhabitants)
- Yoroko (2 439 inhabitants)
- Yoroko-Peulh (201 inhabitants)
- Youga (1 018 inhabitants)
- Youga-Peulh (534 inhabitants)
- Youkouka (374 inhabitants)
- Youngou (6 343 inhabitants)
- Youngou-Peulh (201 inhabitants)
- Zakare (375 inhabitants)
- Zihoun (3 566 inhabitants)
- Zourma (7 121 inhabitants)
