= Beka Sheklashvili =

Georgian rugby union player

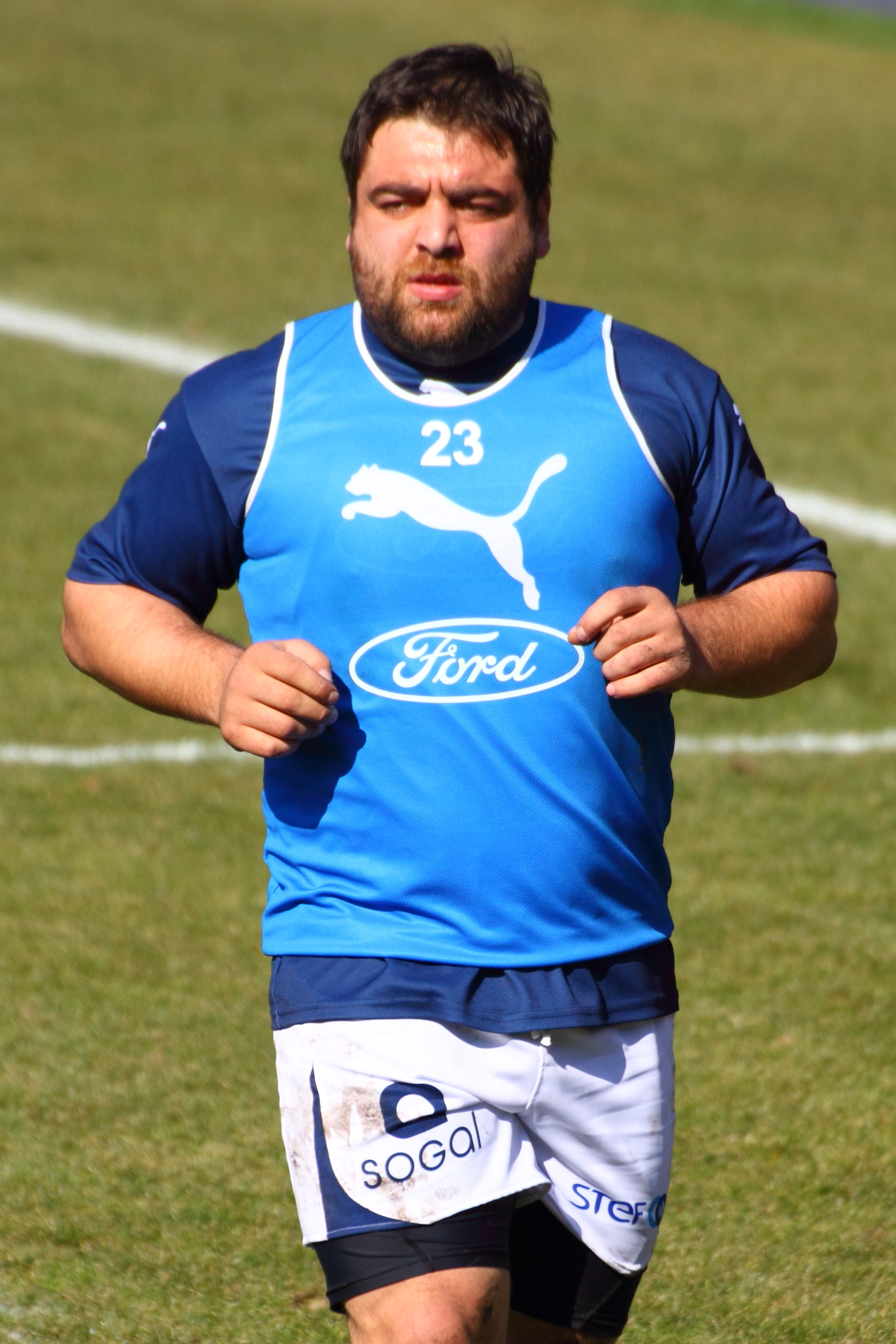
- Sheklashvili in 2012
- Born: July 6, 1986 (age 40) Tbilisi, Georgia
- Height: 1.90 m (6 ft 3 in)
- Weight: 135 kg (21 st 4 lb)

Rugby union career
- Position: Tighthead Prop
Senior career
Years	Team	Apps	(Points)
2009-2010	Montauban	12	(0)
2010-2012	Agen	47	(0)
2012-2014	Béziers	51	(15)
2014-2017	Albi	77	(15)
2017-	Colomiers	88	(20)
- Correct as of 17 April 2020
International career
Years	Team	Apps	(Points)
2008	géorgia	8	(0)

Beka Sheklashvili (Georgian: ბექა შეყლაშვილი) is a Georgian rugby union player. He plays for Georgia and for US Colomiers in Pro D2.
