= Bourma, Boulgou =

Bourma
- Village
- Country: Burkina Faso
- Region: Centre-Est Region
- Province: Boulgou Province
- Department: Zabré Department

Population (2019)
  - Total: 2,175

Bourma, Boulgou is a village in the Zabré Department of Boulgou Province in south-eastern Burkina Faso.

Population
Year	Pop.	±%
2006	905	—
2019	2,175	+140.3%
