= Malidoma Patrice Somé =

Author from Burkina Faso, West Africa (1956–2021)

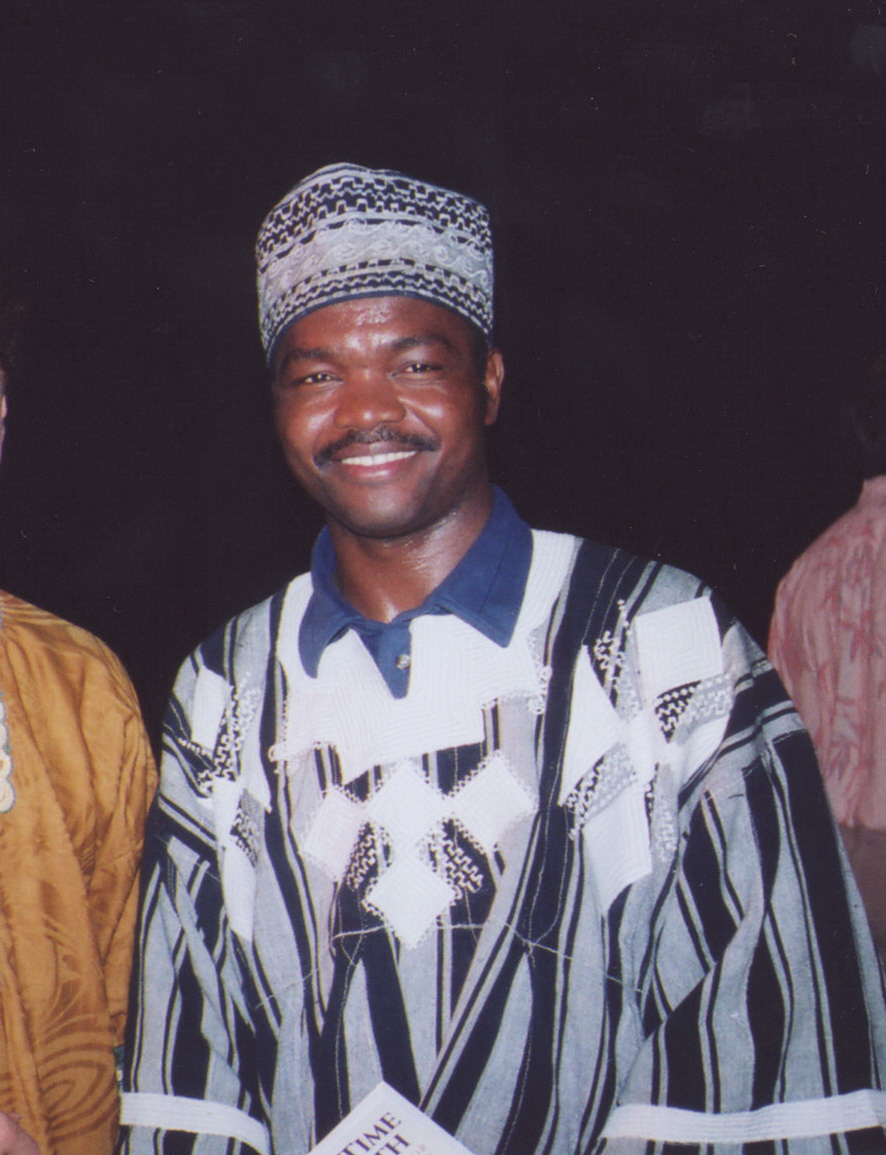
- Born: January 30, 1956; Dano, Burkina Faso
- Died: December 9, 2021 (aged 65)
- Occupation: Author
- Known for: books, workshops, lectures

Malidoma Patrice Somé (1956–2021) was a writer and workshop leader, primarily in the field of spirituality. Born in a Dagara community in Dano, Burkina Faso, West Africa, he was raised by Jesuit priests from the age of four, pursued higher education in the West, and spent most of his adult life in the United States and Europe.

== Background ==
At age four, Somé was removed from the Dagara community by his father, and taken to a Jesuit boarding school where he was provided with a Western education by the priests. Somé wrote that he endured sixteen years of physical and emotional abuse by the priests, and that he then left this school when he was twenty to return to the village of his birth. Upon his return, integration into the traditional tribal religion and customs of the Dagara people was difficult, due to his long absence from his parents' culture, and his indoctrination into Christianity and a "white man's world". Elders from the village said that they believed Somé's ancestral spirit had withdrawn from his body and that he had already undergone a type of rite of passage into manhood in the white world. Despite this, they agreed to let him undergo a belated manhood rite with a younger group of males in the tribe. All males in the community undergo the manhood rite. Somé says that, having been raised outside of the culture and not speaking the language made the month-long, baor process, believed to unite soul and body, more dangerous for him than for the culturally-Dagara youths undergoing the rite.

Somé wrote that each person is born with a destiny, and he or she is given a name that reflects that destiny. Somé said his name, Malidoma, means "friend of the enemy/stranger." Somé wrote that he believed it was his destiny to come to Western audiences and promote an understanding between Western and African cultures.

After living in the US for about ten years, while completing a PhD at Brandeis University, Somé went back to Burkina Faso for an arranged marriage to Sobonfu Somé, a member of the Dagara tribe. They later divorced. Sobonfu Somé died in 2017.

== Education ==
Somé held three master's degrees and two doctorates from the Sorbonne and Brandeis University.

Before his death, Somé conducted Kontomble initiation and divination retreats and other workshops in the US and Europe, and established a community on the East Coast of the United States.

== Death ==
Somé died on December 9, 2021, under unclear circumstances, and the cause of death remains unknown. One source suggested it may have been linked to a hormonal complication possibly caused by contaminated water.

== Bibliography ==
- Ritual: Power, Healing and Community, Swan and Raven (1993). ISBN 0-14-01-9558-0
- Of Water and the Spirit: Ritual, Magic and Initiation in the Life of an African Shaman, Tarcher/Putnam (1994). ISBN 978-0-87477-762-8
- The Healing Wisdom of Africa, Tarcher/Putman (1999). ISBN 0-87477-991-X
