= Benya Kipala =

- Country: Burkina Faso
- Region: Centre-Est Region
- Province: Boulgou Province
- Department: Zabré Department

Population (2019)
  - Total: 1,296

Benya Kipala is a town in the Zabré Department of Boulgou Province in south-eastern Burkina Faso.

Population
Year	Pop.	±%
2006	1,314	—
2019	1,296	−1.4%
