= Beka Kurkhuli =

Georgian writer and literary scholar (born 1974)

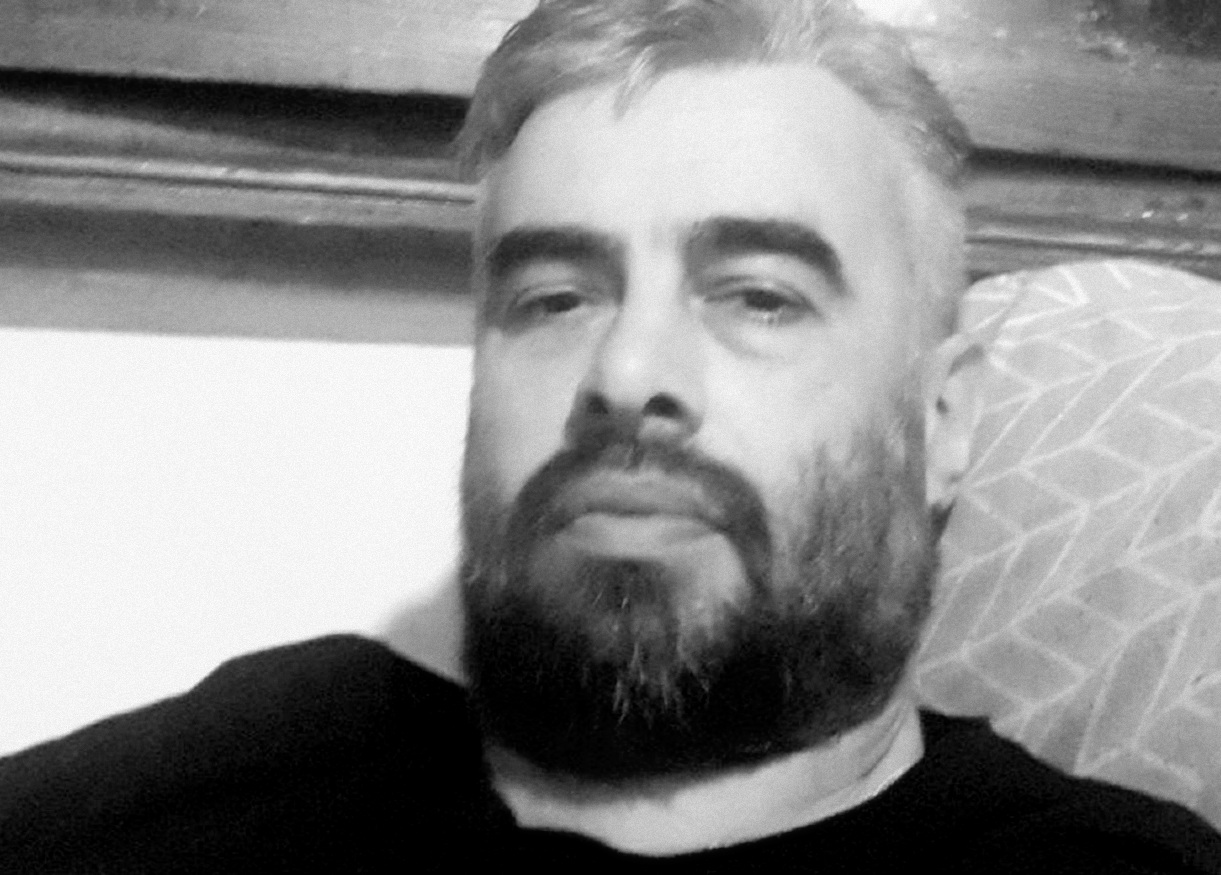
- Born: October 6, 1974 (age 52); Tbilisi, Georgia
- Education: Tbilisi State University
- Occupations: Writer, military reporter
- Writing career
- Language: Georgian
- Years active: 1991-present
- Genres: Novel, short story, story
- Notable works: The City in Snow (2013); Notes of a Kipchak who lost one eye (2020)

Beka Kurkhuli (Georgian: ბექა ქურხული; born 6 October 1974) is a modern Georgian writer and military reporter.

== Biography ==
Beka Kurkhuli was born on October 6, 1974, in Tbilisi. In 1991, he graduated from the first experimental school in Tbilisi. In 1991-1996 he studied at the Shota Rustaveli Tbilisi Theater and Cinema Institute, at the Faculty of Dramatic Art (in the workshop of Tamaz Chiladze).

The first stories were published in 1991 in the newspaper "Mamuli". After that, his stories were systematically printed in Georgian literary magazines and newspapers: "Alternative", "Arily", "Dilis Gazeti" (Morning newspaper), "Chveni Mtserloba" (Our literature), "Tsignebi" (Books), newspaper "24 Saati" (24 hours), "Parnassi" (Parnas), "Literaturuli Palitra" (Literary palette), "Literaturuli Gazeti" (Literary newspaper), "Literature - Tskheli Shokoladi", "Apra".

From 1999 to 2004, he worked as a military reporter in hot spots in Georgia and the Caucasus. He made reports from Abkhazia, North Ossetia, Tskhinvali, Ingushetia, the Pankisi Gorge in Georgia.

In 2006, he defended his thesis on the theme: "Hikes and raids in the mountains of the Eastern Caucasus."

From 2011 to 2013, he collaborated with Media House Dekom — magazines Tskheli Shokoladi and Liberali.

2013 was on a business trip to Afghanistan as reporter.

From May 10 to June 12, 2022, he was sent as a war reporter trip on behalf of Mediacom "Publica", in the Russian invasion of Ukraine – (Lviv, Kyiv, Irpin, Dnipro, Zaporizhzhia).

== Bibliography ==
- 2004 — "Point ... Lost People of Lost Territory"
- 2005 — "House in a foreign land"
- 2010 — "Meeting after that"
- 2011 — "The Story of Two Moons"
- 2012 — "Short night of summer"
- 2013 — "City in the snow"
- 2013 — "Notes of 1993-2011"
- 2014 — "Country of open doors"
- 2015 — "Escape from Paradise"
- 2017 — "Skandara and other stories"
- 2020 — "Notes of a Kipchak who lost one eye"
- 2022 — "Ukraine Days" (military diaries)

== Literary prizes ==
- 2006 — "House in a foreign land" - literary award "Saba" in the nomination "The best prosaic collection of the year" — nominee.
- 2013 — the play "The tree is about to fall". Literary award "Saba" in the nomination "The best play of the year" — nominee.
- 2014 — "Notes of 1993-2011". Literary award "Saba" in the nomination "Best Documentary Prose and Essay of the Year" — nominee.
- 2014 — "City in the snow." The literary award "Saba" in the nomination "The best prose collection of the year" is a nominee.
- 2014 — "The previous day." Literary Award "one story" to them. Revaz Inanishvili. I place
- 2016 — the novel "Escape from Paradise". Literary award "Saba" in the nomination "The best novel of the year" — the winner.
- 2017 — "Endless deja vue at the easel." The literary prize "Tbilisi" for the best story of the year – the nominee.
- 2018 — "Scandara and Other Stories". Literary Award "Litera" in the nomination "The best prose collection of the year" — the winner.
- 2019 — Ilia Chavchavadze award, "Saguramo".
- 2021 — "Notes of a Kipchak who lost one eye". Literary prize "Litera" in the nomination "The Best novel of the year for the novel" — the winner.
- 2021 — "Notes of a Kipchak who lost one eye". Literary prize "Fazisi" — the winner.

The works of Beka Kurkhuli are translated into English, Polish, Turkish, Czech, Lithuanian, Ukrainian, Slovak, Avar (Dagestan), Ossetian and Russian languages.

The prose collection “The City in the Snow” was translated into Italian and published by “Stilo editrice” (Bari, Italy) in 2018.
