= White Volta =

Headstream of the Volta River

White Volta Volta blanche
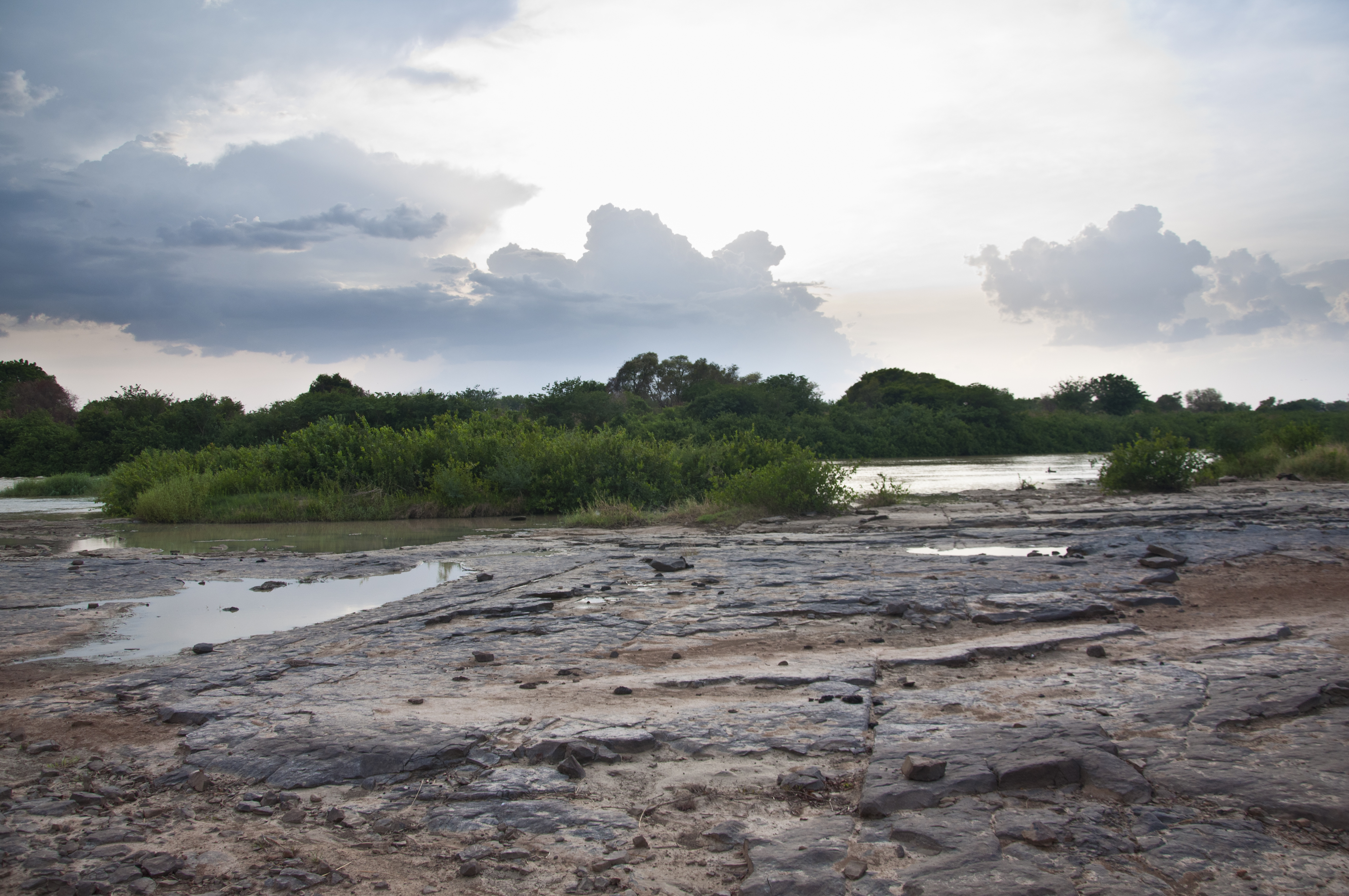
- White Volta in the dry season (Ghana)

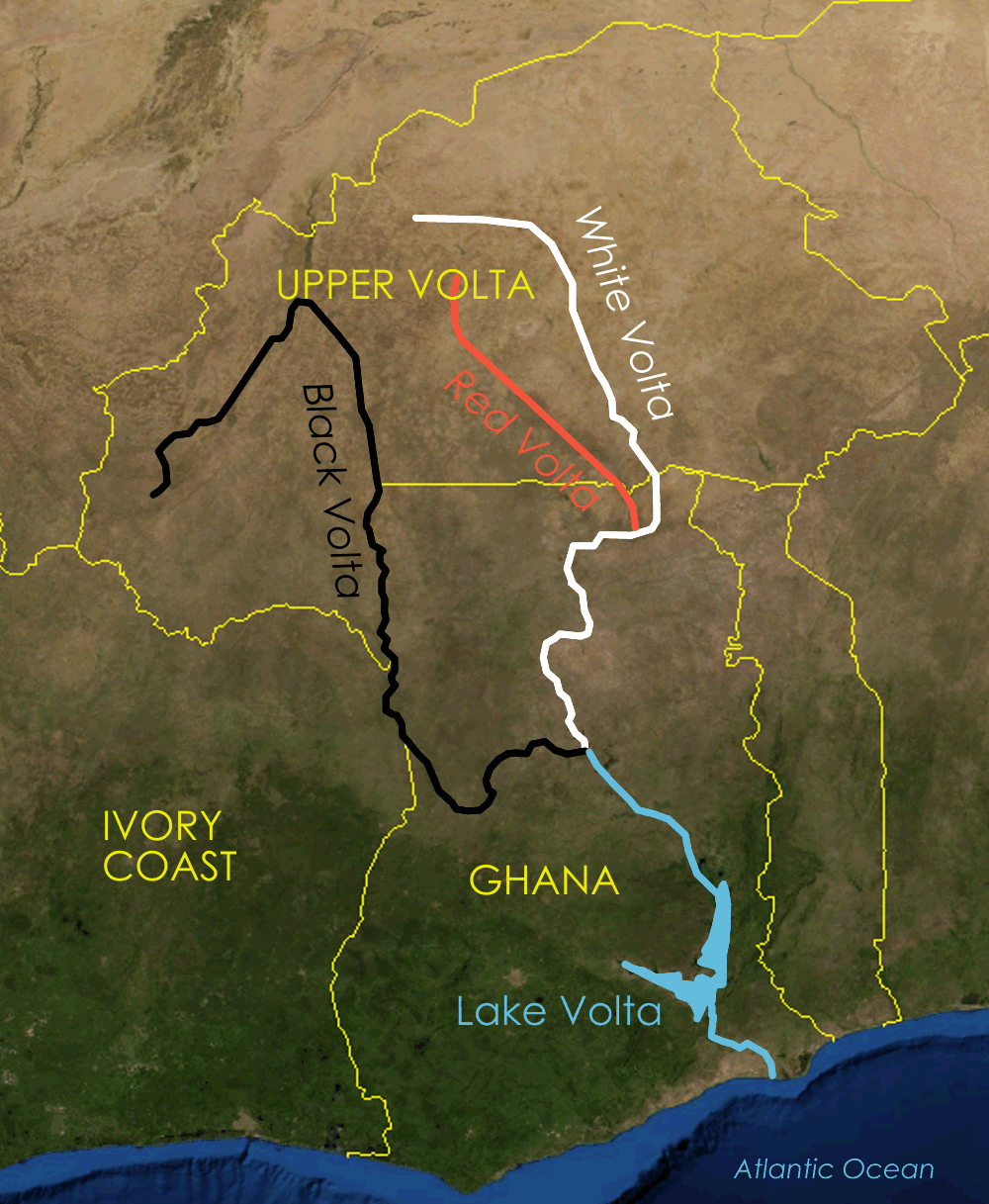
- White Volta shown in white

Location
- Countries: Ghana and Burkina Faso

Physical characteristics
- Mouth: Volta River
  - location: Lake Volta
  - coordinates: 9°10′00″N 1°15′00″W
- Length: 885 km (550 mi)
- Basin size: 117,200 km^{2} (45,300 sq mi)
- Discharge
  - location: Mouth

The White Volta or Nakambé (French: Volta blanche) is the headstream of the Volta River, Ghana's main waterway. The White Volta emerges in northern Burkina Faso, flows through Northern Ghana and empties into Lake Volta in Ghana. The White Volta's main tributaries are the Black Volta and the Red Volta.The river has a length of approximately 640–885 km, depending on the measurement method used, and drains a large transboundary basin shared primarily by Burkina Faso and Ghana.

== Course and basin ==
The White Volta is one of the principal tributaries of the Volta River. It rises from Burkina Faso as Nakanbé and drains southward into northern Ghana to form Lake Volta. The Volta River Basin comprises the drainage basins of the Volta River and its various branches, including the White Volta, Black Volta, Red Volta, Oti, and Lower Volta sub basins.

The White Volta Basin spans some portions of Burkina Faso and Ghana. Within Ghana, the White Volta is significant for the country's northern region, where it provides opportunities for rural livelihoods through flood plains agriculture, animal watering, fishing, and domestic water use. Its significance lies in being the conduit for semi-arid/sub-humid West Africa to the rest of the Volta system.

== Tributaries ==
The White Volta starts from the river called Nakanbé in Burkina Faso. Red Volta, or Nazinon, as well as Sissili, are two of the major tributaries of White Volta, and they also originate in Burkina Faso. There is also the Black Volta, or Mouhoun, which is one of the main branches in Volta system; however, it needs to be considered separately as the headwater of the whole Volta River system.

Tributary system of the White Volta gives importance of the river to the region since water supply and the possibility of floods in along the river depends on the quantity of precipitation in Burkina Faso.

== Impact ==
The White Volta is a major source of drinking water for many communities along its banks and further away from the water channel. It also causes seasonal flooding to many of the communities along its banks.
