= Assio =

- Location in Burkina Faso
- Coordinates: 11°40′N 3°8′W
- Country: Burkina Faso
- Region: Boucle du Mouhoun Region
- Province: Balé
- Department: Bagassi Department

Population (2019)
  - Total: 1,549
- Time zone: UTC+0 (GMT 0)

Assio is a small town in the Bagassi Department of Balé Province in southern Burkina Faso.

Nearby towns and villages include Ouahabou (2.2 nm) and Pâ (9.8 nm).

Population
Year	Pop.	±%
1985	728	—
2006	2,003	+175.1%
2019	1,549	−22.7%
