= Sio =

Sio or SIO may refer to:

== Places ==
- Sió, an artificial channel in Hungary
- Siø, a small Danish island in the South Funen Archipelago
- Sio, Burkina Faso, a village in Burkina Faso
- Sio, Mali, a commune in Mali
- Sio, Papua New Guinea, a town in Papua New Guinea
- Sio, a river in Western Africa providing water for the Lake Togo
- Smithton Airport (IATA airport code), Tasmania, Australia

== Computing ==
- Atari SIO, a peripheral bus
- Super I/O, a motherboard chipset component
- Start I/O (SIO) instruction on IBM S/360 or S/370.

== Organizations ==
- Scripps Institution of Oceanography, La Jolla, California, U.S.
- Students Islamic Organisation of India
- Foundation for Student Life in Oslo (Studentsamskipnaden i Oslo)
- Sexarbejdernes Interesse Organisation, a Nordic organization of sex workers (see Prostitution in Sweden)

== People ==
- Sio (cartoonist), Italian comics artist
- William Sio (born 1960), New Zealand politician
- David Sio (born 1962), Samoan rugby union footballer
- Giovanni Sio (born 1989), Ivorian international footballer
- Ken Sio (born 1990), Australian rugby league player
- Michael Sio (born 1993), New Zealand rugby league player

== Other uses ==
- Battle of Sio, part of the New Guinea campaign of World War II
- ISO 639:sio or Siouan, a language family of North America
- Sio language, an Austronesian language
- Sio (fish), a genus of fish
- SiO, the chemical formula for Silicon monoxide
- SiO2, the chemical formula for Silicon dioxide
- Senior Investigating Officer, the lead officer in a criminal investigation in the U.K.

== See also ==
- De Sio, a surname
