= Oury =

Oury may refer to:

== Places ==
- Oury, Burkina Faso, a town in Burkina Faso
  - Oury Department, the surrounding department in Balé Province, Burkina Faso
- Aly Oury, a town in Senegal
- Saint-Martin-du-Mesnil-Oury, a commune in Normandy, France

== People ==
- Gérard Oury (1919–2006), French film director
- Granville Henderson Oury (1825–1891), American politician
- Fernand Oury (1920–1997), French teacher
- Jean Oury (1924–2014), French psychiatrist
- Anna Caroline Oury (1808–1880), German-French pianist
- Oury Jalloh (1968–2005), asylum seeker from Sierra Leone, died in police cell in Dessau, Germany
