= Lapara (disambiguation) =

Lapara is a town in the Boromo Department of Balé Province in south-western Burkina Faso

Lapara may also refer to:

- Lapara (moth), a genus of moths in the family Sphingidae
- Lapara, Purulia, a census town in West Bengal, India
