= Nanou =

- Location in Burkina Faso
- Coordinates: 11°46′N 3°5′W
- Country: Burkina Faso
- Region: Boucle du Mouhoun Region
- Province: Balé
- Department: Boromo Department

Population (2019)
  - Total: 3,308

Nanou is a town in the Boromo Department of Balé Province in south-western Burkina Faso.

Population
Year	Pop.	±%
1985	1,297	—
2006	2,828	+118.0%
2019	3,308	+17.0%
