= Kalembouly =

- Country: Burkina Faso
- Region: Boucle du Mouhoun Region
- Province: Balé
- Department: Siby Department

Population (2019)
  - Total: 1,930
- Time zone: UTC+0 (GMT 0)

Kalembouly is a town in the Siby Department of Balé Province in south-western Burkina Faso.

Population
Year	Pop.	±%
1985	953	—
2006	1,471	+54.4%
2019	1,930	+31.2%
