= Kietou =

Coordinates: 11°58′N 3°18′W

- Interactive map of Kietou
- Country: Burkina Faso
- Region: Boucle du Mouhoun Region
- Province: Balé
- Department: Pompoï Department

Population (2019)
  - Total: 556
- Time zone: UTC+0 (GMT)

Kietou is a village in the Pompoï Department of Balé Province in southern Burkina Faso.

Population
Year	Pop.	±%
1985	176	—
2006	400	+127.3%
2019	556	+39.0%
