= Pig-poré =

- Country: Burkina Faso
- Region: Boucle du Mouhoun Region
- Province: Balé
- Department: Poura Department

Population (2019)
  - Total: 844

Pig-poré is a village in the Poura Department of Balé Province in southern Burkina Faso.

Population
| Year | Pop. | ±% |
|---|---|---|
| 1985 | 377 | — |
| 2006 | 2,940 | +679.8% |
| 2019 | 844 | −71.3% |
