= Yamané =

Yamané may refer to:

- Yamané, Balé, Burkina Faso
- Yamané, Bam, Burkina Faso
