= Bissa =

Bissa may refer to:

- Bissa people
- Bissa language
- Bissa, Burkina Faso (disambiguation)
- Donald Bissa (born 1991), Ivorian professional footballer
