= Zinakongo =

- Country: Burkina Faso
- Region: Boucle du Mouhoun Region
- Province: Balé Province
- Department: Oury Department

Population (2019)
  - Total: 1,818
- Time zone: UTC+0 (GMT)

Zinakongo is a town in the Oury Department of Balé Province in southern Burkina Faso.

Population
Year	Pop.	±%
2006	1,384	—
2019	1,818	+31.4%
