= Somona =

- Location in Burkina Faso
- Coordinates: 11°59′N 3°25′W
- Country: Burkina Faso
- Region: Boucle du Mouhoun Region
- Province: Balé
- Department: Bana Department

Population (2019)
  - Total: 820

Somona is a village in the Bana Department of Balé Province in south-western Burkina Faso.

Population
Year	Pop.	±%
1985	268	—
2006	488	+82.1%
2019	820	+68.0%
