= Ouako =

- Location in Burkina Faso
- Coordinates: 11°48′N 2°57′W
- Country: Burkina Faso
- Region: Boucle du Mouhoun Region
- Province: Balé
- Department: Boromo Department

Population (2019)
  - Total: 1,345

Ouako is a village in the Boromo Department of Balé Province in southern Burkina Faso.

Population
Year	Pop.	±%
1985	614	—
2006	903	+47.1%
2019	1,345	+48.9%
