= Sanfo =

- Country: Burkina Faso
- Region: Boucle du Mouhoun Region
- Province: Balé Province
- Department: Oury Department

Population (2019)
  - Total: 813
- Time zone: UTC+0 (GMT)

Sanfo is a village in the Oury Department of Balé Province in southern Burkina Faso.

Population
Year	Pop.	±%
1985	397	—
2006	654	+64.7%
2019	813	+24.3%
