= Bounou =

Bounou may refer to:

== People ==
- Mehdi Bounou (born 1997), Belgian footballer
- Yassine Bounou (born 1991), Moroccan footballer

== Places ==
- Bounou, Bagassi, town in the Bagassi Department of Balé Province in southern Burkina Faso
- Bounou, Yaba, town in the Yaba Department of Nayala Province in north-western Burkina Faso
