= Yona, Burkina Faso =

Yona
- Location in Burkina Faso
- Coordinates: 11°58′N 3°23′W
- Country: Burkina Faso
- Region: Boucle du Mouhoun Region
- Province: Balé
- Department: Bana Department

Population (2019)
  - Total: 3,042

Yona is a town in the Bana Department of Balé Province in south-western Burkina Faso.

Population
| Year | Pop. | ±% |
|---|---|---|
| 1985 | 1,313 | — |
| 2006 | 2,295 | +74.8% |
| 2019 | 3,042 | +32.5% |
