= Koho =

Koho or KOHO may refer to:

- Koho language, a language of Vietnam
- K'Ho an ethnic group of Vietnam
- Kōhō, a Japanese era
- Koho, Burkina Faso, a town
- Koho (company), an ice hockey equipment company
- Koho (fintech), a Canadian neobank
- KOHO-FM, a radio station
- KOHO-AM, a Japanese language radio station in Honolulu, Hawaii active from 1959 to 2000
- Nickname for retired NHL referee Don Koharski
- Ville Koho (born 1982), Finnish ice hockey player

== See also ==
- Coho (disambiguation)
