= Dablara =

Dablara Daboulara
- Country: Burkina Faso
- Region: Boucle du Mouhoun Region
- Province: Balé Province
- Department: Oury Department

Population (2019)
  - Total: 651
- Time zone: UTC+0 (GMT)

Dablara is a village in the Oury Department of Balé Province in southern Burkina Faso.

Population
Year	Pop.	±%
1985	165	—
2006	503	+204.8%
2019	651	+29.4%
