= Habé =

- Location within Burkina Faso
- Coordinates: 11°52′N 3°8′W
- Country: Burkina Faso
- Region: Boucle du Mouhoun Region
- Province: Balé Province
- Department: Oury Department

Population (2019)
  - Total: 1,034
- Time zone: UTC+0 (GMT)

Habé is a village in the Oury Department of Balé Province in southern Burkina Faso.

Population
Year	Pop.	±%
1985	440	—
2006	709	+61.1%
2019	1,034	+45.8%
