= Souho =

- Country: Burkina Faso
- Region: Boucle du Mouhoun Region
- Province: Balé
- Department: Siby Department

Population (2019)
  - Total: 1,101
- Time zone: UTC+0 (GMT 0)

Souho is a village in the Siby Department of Balé Province in south-western Burkina Faso.

Population
| Year | Pop. | ±% |
|---|---|---|
| 1985 | 768 | — |
| 2006 | 1,189 | +54.8% |
| 2019 | 1,101 | −7.4% |
