= Badié =

- Location within Burkina Faso
- Coordinates: 11°12′N 3°10′W
- Country: Burkina Faso
- Region: Boucle du Mouhoun Region
- Province: Balé
- Department: Bagassi Department

Population (2019)
  - Total: 1,124
- Time zone: UTC+0 (GMT 0)

Badié is a village in the Bagassi Department of Balé Province in southern Burkina Faso.

Population
Year	Pop.	±%
1985	685	—
2006	1,796	+162.2%
2019	1,124	−37.4%
