= Sayaro =

Sayaro Sayero
- Country: Burkina Faso
- Region: Boucle du Mouhoun Region
- Province: Balé
- Department: Bagassi Department

Population (2019)
  - Total: 1,222
- Time zone: UTC+0 (GMT 0)

Sayaro is a town in the Bagassi Department of Balé Province in southern Burkina Faso.

Population
Year	Pop.	±%
1985	1,120	—
2006	1,417	+26.5%
2019	1,222	−13.8%
