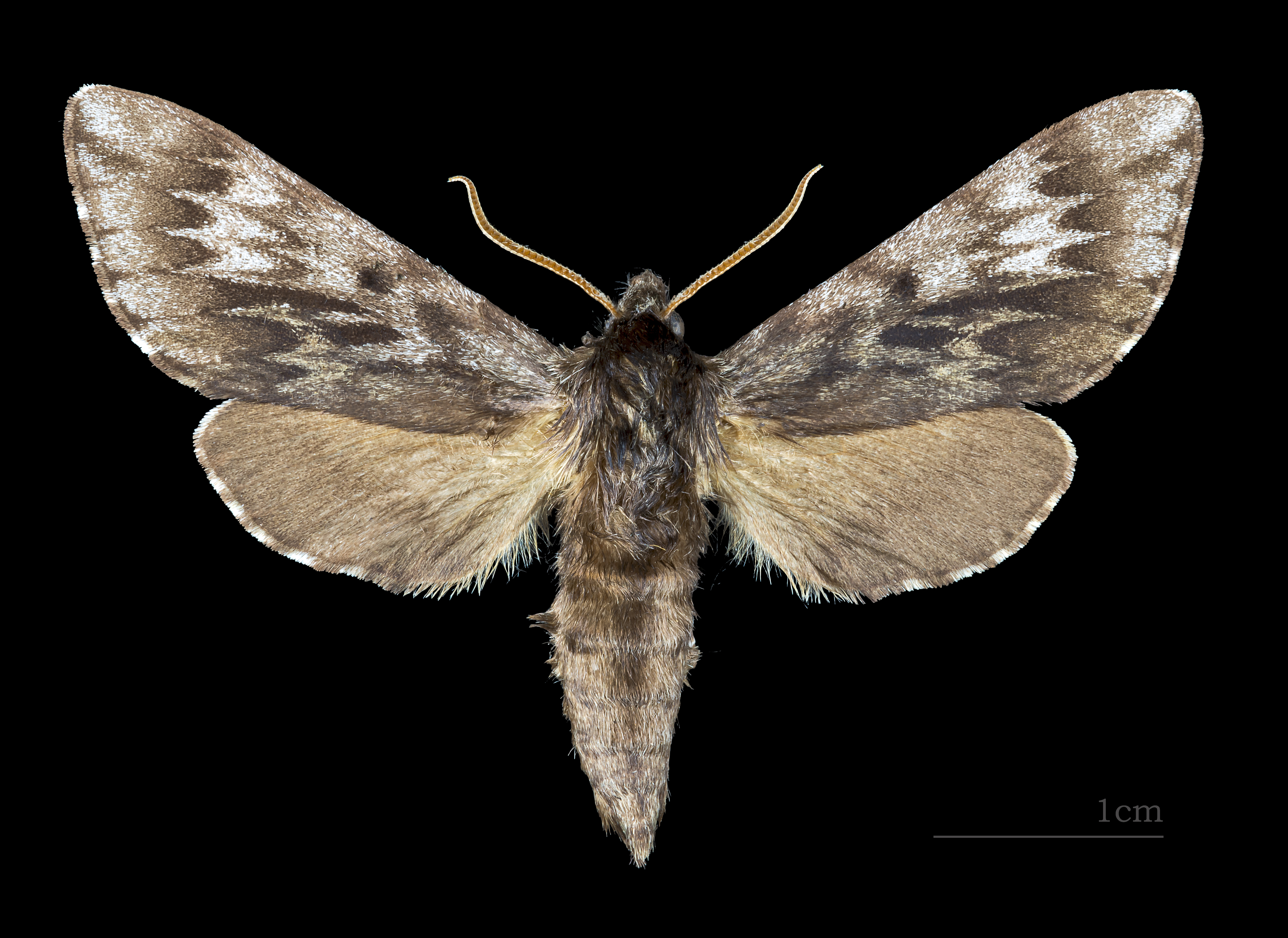
- Male, dorsal view
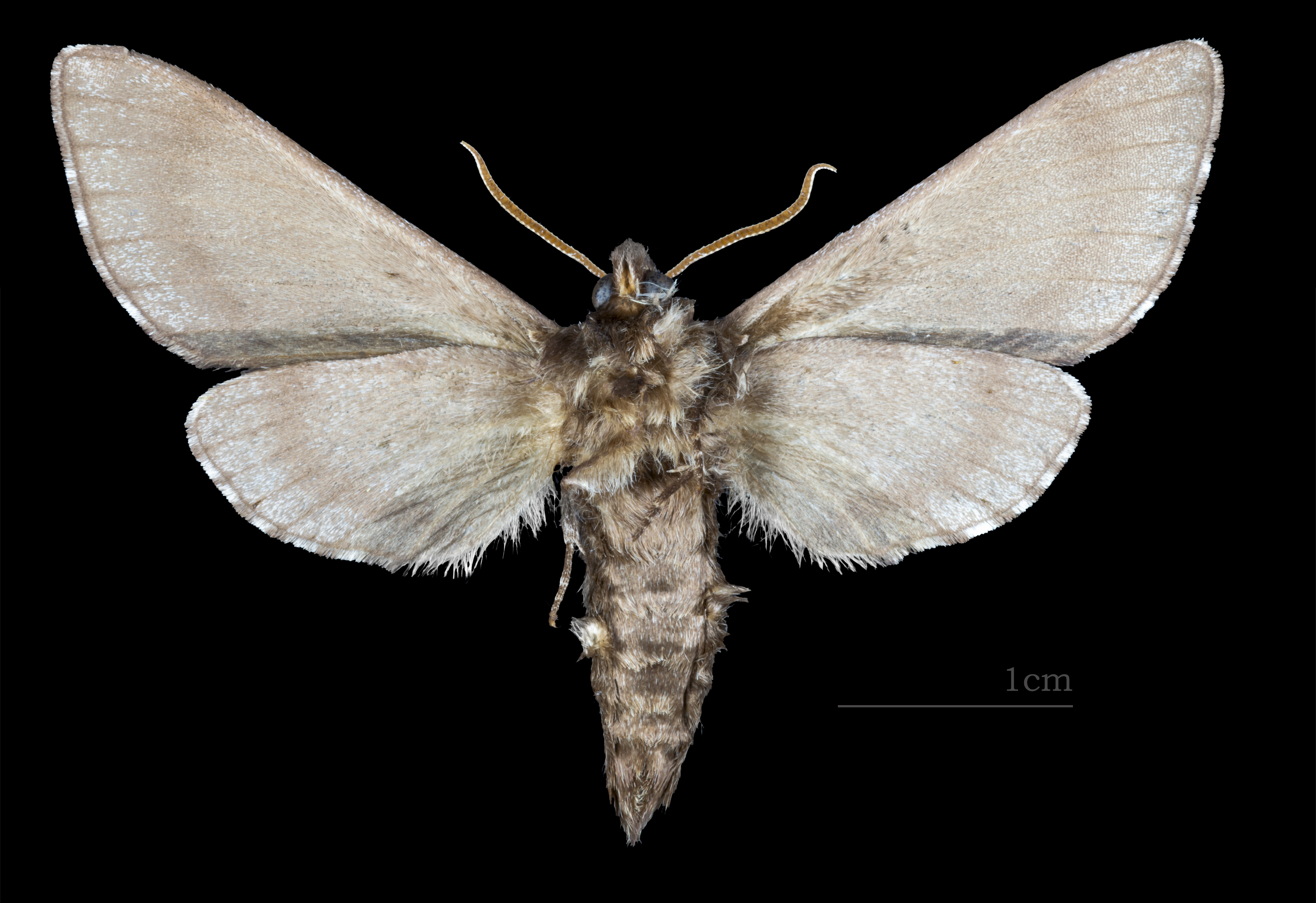
- Male, ventral view

Conservation status
- Secure (NatureServe)

Scientific classification
- Kingdom: Animalia
- Phylum: Arthropoda
- Class: Insecta
- Order: Lepidoptera
- Family: Sphingidae
- Genus: Lapara
- Species: L. bombycoides

Binomial name
- Lapara bombycoides Walker, 1856

Synonyms
- Ellema harrisi Clemens, 1859; Ellema pineum Lintner, 1872

= Lapara bombycoides =

Northern pine sphinx

Species of moth

Lapara bombycoides, the northern pine sphinx is a moth of the family Sphingidae. The species was first described by Francis Walker in 1856.

== Description ==
The wingspan is 45–60 mm. It is a variable species. The forewing upperside is darker than in similar Lapara coniferarum and the antemedian lines are more distinct.

== Biology ==
Adults are on wing from mid-June to mid-July in Canada.

The larvae feed on various pine species, including Pinus resinosa, Pinus rigida and Pinus sylvestris as well as Larix laricina.
