= Koena =

Koena may refer to:

- Koena tribe, a Sotho-Tswana community
- Koena (Balé Province), a town in Burkina Faso
