= Bandiara =

- Country: Burkina Faso
- Region: Boucle du Mouhoun Region
- Province: Balé Province
- Department: Oury Department

Population (2019)
  - Total: 834
- Time zone: UTC+0 (GMT)

Bandiara is a village in the Oury Department of Balé Province in southern Burkina Faso.

Population
Year	Pop.	±%
1985	148	—
2006	516	+248.6%
2019	834	+61.6%
