= Kayio =

- Country: Burkina Faso
- Region: Boucle du Mouhoun Region
- Province: Balé
- Department: Bagassi Department

Population (2019)
  - Total: 1,418
- Time zone: UTC+0 (GMT 0)

Kayio is a town in the Bagassi Department of Balé Province in southern Burkina Faso.

Population
Year	Pop.	±%
1985	1,074	—
2006	1,144	+6.5%
2019	1,418	+24.0%
