= Pompoï-gare =

Coordinates: 11°51′49″N 3°13′49″W

- Interactive map of Pompoï-gare
- Country: Burkina Faso
- Region: Boucle du Mouhoun Region
- Province: Balé
- Department: Pompoï Department

Population (2019)
  - Total: 1,110
- Time zone: UTC+0 (GMT)

Pompoï-gare is a village in the Pompoï Department of Balé Province in southern Burkina Faso.

Population
| Year | Pop. | ±% |
|---|---|---|
| 2006 | 943 | — |
| 2019 | 1,110 | +17.7% |
