= Kana, Burkina Faso =

Kana
- Location in Burkina Faso
- Coordinates: 11°52′N 3°22′W
- Country: Burkina Faso
- Region: Boucle du Mouhoun Region
- Province: Balé
- Department: Bagassi Department

Population (2019)
  - Total: 1,064
- Time zone: UTC+0 (GMT 0)

Kana is a village in the Bagassi Department of Balé Province in southwestern Burkina Faso.

Population
Year	Pop.	±%
1985	465	—
2006	891	+91.6%
2019	1,064	+19.4%
