= Siou =

Siou may refer to:

- Siou, Togo
- Siou, Burkina Faso
