= Basnéré =

Basnéré Bassenere
- Country: Burkina Faso
- Region: Boucle du Mouhoun Region
- Province: Balé
- Department: Poura Department

Population (2019)
  - Total: 525

Basnéré is a village in the Poura Department of Balé Province in southern Burkina Faso.

Population
| Year | Pop. | ±% |
|---|---|---|
| 1985 | 529 | — |
| 2006 | 1,503 | +184.1% |
| 2019 | 525 | −65.1% |
