= Pana, Burkina Faso =

Pana
- Location in Burkina Faso
- Coordinates: 11°53′N 3°11′W
- Country: Burkina Faso
- Region: Boucle du Mouhoun Region
- Province: Balé
- Department: Pompoï Department

Population (2019)
  - Total: 1,212
- Time zone: UTC+0 (GMT)

Pana, Burkina Faso is a village in the Pompoï Department of Balé Province in southern Burkina Faso, Africa.

Population
Year	Pop.	±%
1985	670	—
2006	881	+31.5%
2019	1,212	+37.6%
