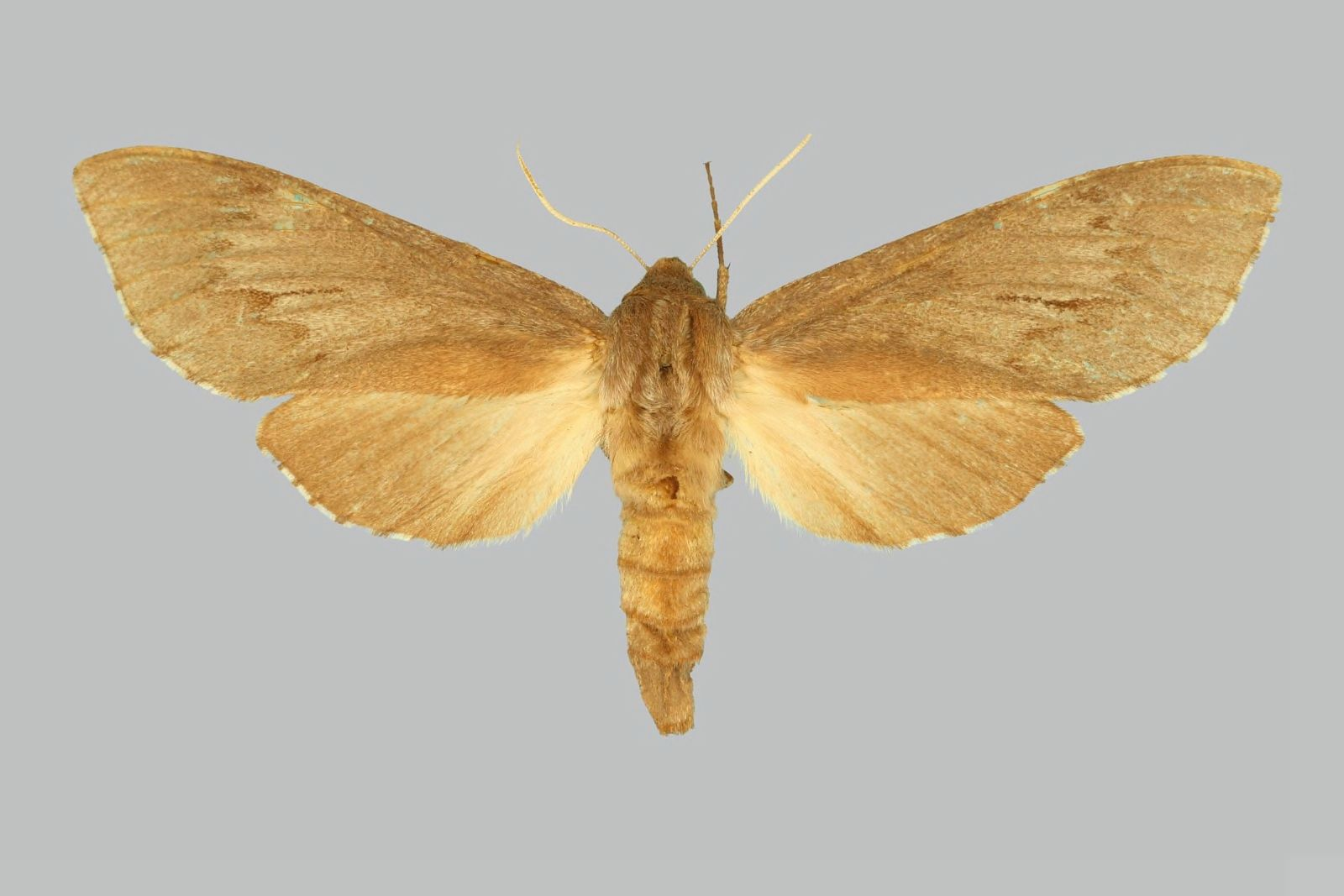

Scientific classification
- Domain: Eukaryota
- Kingdom: Animalia
- Phylum: Arthropoda
- Class: Insecta
- Order: Lepidoptera
- Family: Sphingidae
- Genus: Lapara
- Species: L. halicarnie

Binomial name
- Lapara halicarnie Strecker, 1880

Synonyms
- Sphinx halicarnie Strecker, 1880

= Lapara halicarnie =

Species of moth

Lapara halicarnie is a moth of the family Sphingidae, generally considered a variety of Lapara coniferarum. It is known from Florida.

The larvae probably feed on Pinus palustris and Pinus taeda.
