= Sienkoro =

Sienkoro Siankoro
- Location in Burkina Faso
- Coordinates: 11°57′N 3°28′W
- Country: Burkina Faso
- Region: Boucle du Mouhoun Region
- Province: Balé
- Department: Bana Department

Population (2019)
  - Total: 724

Sienkoro is a village in the Bana Department of Balé Province in south-western Burkina Faso.

Population
Year	Pop.	±%
1985	276	—
2006	509	+84.4%
2019	724	+42.2%
