= Koupelo =

Coordinates: 11.8503°N 3.0985°W

Koupelo Koupela
- Interactive map of Koupelo
- Country: Burkina Faso
- Region: Boucle du Mouhoun Region
- Province: Balé Province
- Department: Oury Department

Population (2019)
  - Total: 1,167
- Time zone: UTC+0 (GMT)

Koupelo is a village in the Oury Department of Balé Province in southern Burkina Faso.

Population
Year	Pop.	±%
1985	516	—
2006	791	+53.3%
2019	1,167	+47.5%
