= Danou (disambiguation) =

Danou is a town in Burkina Faso.

Danou may also refer to:

== Places ==
- Danou River, river in the Central African Republic
- Danou, Mali, a commune

== People ==
- Chris Danou (born 1967), former Wisconsin legislator
- Ersi Danou (born 1964), Greek filmmaker
- Maria Danou (born 1990), Greek skier

== See also ==
- Danao (disambiguation)
- Danau (disambiguation)
- Dano (disambiguation)
- Danu (disambiguation)
