= Yaro (disambiguation) =

Yaro is a town in the Bagassi Department of Balé Province in southern Burkina Faso

Yaro may refer to:

- Yaro people, an extinct ethnicity of Uruguay
- Yaro culture, a pre-Inca culture located in northern Peru, also known as Yarowillka.
- Sengoku Yaro, a 1963 Japanese adventure film directed by Kihachi Okamoto
- Yaro Dachniwsky (born 1963), a retired American soccer goalkeeper
