= Didié =

- Location in Burkina Faso
- Coordinates: 11°35′N 3°23′W
- Country: Burkina Faso
- Region: Boucle du Mouhoun Region
- Province: Balé
- Department: Pâ Department

Population (2019)
  - Total: 1,865

Didié is a town located in the Pâ Department of Balé Province in Burkina Faso.

Population
Year	Pop.	±%
1985	963	—
2006	1,188	+23.4%
2019	1,865	+57.0%
