= Momina =

Momina may refer to:

- Momina, Burkina Faso
- Momina, Poland

== See also ==
- Momino (disambiguation)
