= Boro, Burkina Faso =

Boro
- Location within Burkina Faso
- Coordinates: 11°39′N 1°42′W
- Country: Burkina Faso
- Region: Boucle du Mouhoun Region
- Province: Balé
- Department: Pâ Department

Population (2019)
  - Total: 1,800

Boro is a town in the Pâ Department of Balé Province in south-western Burkina Faso.

Population
Year	Pop.	±%
1985	992	—
2006	2,794	+181.7%
2019	1,800	−35.6%
