= Battiti =

- Location in Burkina Faso
- Coordinates: 11°51′N 3°10′W
- Country: Burkina Faso
- Region: Boucle du Mouhoun Region
- Province: Balé
- Department: Pompoï Department

Population (2019)
  - Total: 830
- Time zone: UTC+0 (GMT)

Battiti is a village in the Pompoï Department of Balé Province in southern Burkina Faso.

Population
Year	Pop.	±%
1985	411	—
2006	595	+44.8%
2019	830	+39.5%
