= Doussi =

- Location in Burkina Faso
- Coordinates: 11°44′N 3°19′W
- Country: Burkina Faso
- Region: Boucle du Mouhoun Region
- Province: Balé
- Department: Bagassi Department

Population (2019)
  - Total: 2,972
- Time zone: UTC+0 (GMT 0)

Doussi is a village in the Bagassi Department of Balé Province in southern Burkina Faso.

Population
Year	Pop.	±%
1985	796	—
2006	1,242	+56.0%
2019	2,972	+139.3%
