= Sécaco =

- Country: Burkina Faso
- Region: Boucle du Mouhoun Region
- Province: Balé
- Department: Siby Department

Population (2019)
  - Total: 3,624
- Time zone: UTC+0 (GMT 0)

Sécaco is a town in the Siby Department of Balé Province in south-western Burkina Faso.

Population
Year	Pop.	±%
1985	3,147	—
2006	2,490	−20.9%
2019	3,624	+45.5%
