= Kokoï =

- Location in Burkina Faso
- Coordinates: 11°54′N 3°18′W
- Country: Burkina Faso
- Region: Boucle du Mouhoun Region
- Province: Balé
- Department: Pompoï Department

Population (2019)
  - Total: 1,420
- Time zone: UTC+0 (GMT)

Kokoï is a town in the Pompoï Department of Balé Province in southern Burkina Faso.

Population
Year	Pop.	±%
1985	489	—
2006	1,024	+109.4%
2019	1,420	+38.7%
