= San, Burkina Faso =

San
- Location in Burkina Faso
- Coordinates: 11°51′N 3°16′W
- Country: Burkina Faso
- Region: Boucle du Mouhoun Region
- Province: Balé
- Department: Pompoï Department

Population (2019)
  - Total: 1,607
- Time zone: UTC+0 (GMT)

San, Burkina Faso is a town in the Pompoï Department of Balé Province in southern Burkina Faso.

Population
Year	Pop.	±%
1985	739	—
2006	1,392	+88.4%
2019	1,607	+15.4%
