= Banou =

- Location in Burkina Faso
- Coordinates: 11°45′N 3°15′W
- Country: Burkina Faso
- Region: Boucle du Mouhoun Region
- Province: Balé
- Department: Bagassi Department

Population (2019)
  - Total: 1,396
- Time zone: UTC+0 (GMT 0)

Banou is a small town in the Bagassi Department of Balé Province in southern Burkina Faso.

Population
Year	Pop.	±%
1985	585	—
2006	1,889	+222.9%
2019	1,396	−26.1%
