= Haho =

Haho may refer to:

- Haho Prefecture, a region of Togo
- Haho River, a tributary of Lake Togo
- Haho, Burkina Faso, a village in Burkina Faso
- Haho of Maui, ancient Hawaiian chief
- Haho Monastery, a Georgian monastery in Turkey
- HAHO (high altitude, high opening), a technique in parachuting
