= Vy, Burkina Faso =

Vy
- Location in Burkina Faso
- Coordinates: 11°46′N 3°8′W
- Country: Burkina Faso
- Region: Boucle du Mouhoun Region
- Province: Balé
- Department: Bagassi Department

Population (2019)
  - Total: 3,514

Vy is a town in the Bagassi Department of Balé Province in southern Burkina Faso.

Population
Year	Pop.	±%
1985	2,880	—
2006	3,210	+11.5%
2019	3,514	+9.5%
