= Lasso, Burkina Faso =

Lasso
- Location within Burkina Faso
- Coordinates: 12°4′N 3°5′W
- Country: Burkina Faso
- Region: Boucle du Mouhoun Region
- Province: Balé Province
- Department: Oury Department

Population (2019)
  - Total: 1,330
- Time zone: UTC+0 (GMT)

Lasso is a town in the Oury Department of Balé Province in southern Burkina Faso.

Population
Year	Pop.	±%
1985	602	—
2006	1,112	+84.7%
2019	1,330	+19.6%
