= Seyou =

- Location within Burkina Faso
- Coordinates: 12°0′N 2°56′W
- Country: Burkina Faso
- Region: Boucle du Mouhoun Region
- Province: Balé Province
- Department: Oury Department

Population (2019)
  - Total: 1,785
- Time zone: UTC+0 (GMT)

Seyou is a town in the Oury Department of Balé Province in southern Burkina Faso. As of 1996 the town had a total population of 1,147.

Population
Year	Pop.	±%
1985	841	—
2006	1,384	+64.6%
2019	1,785	+29.0%
