= Toécin =

Toécin Toessin
- Country: Burkina Faso
- Region: Boucle du Mouhoun Region
- Province: Balé
- Department: Poura Department

Population (2019)
  - Total: 873

Toécin is a village in the Poura Department of Balé Province in southern Burkina Faso.

Population
Year	Pop.	±%
1985	242	—
2006	415	+71.5%
2019	873	+110.4%
