= Haho, Burkina Faso =

Haho
- Location in Burkina Faso
- Coordinates: 11°47′N 3°19′W
- Country: Burkina Faso
- Region: Boucle du Mouhoun Region
- Province: Balé
- Department: Bagassi Department

Population (2019)
  - Total: 512
- Time zone: UTC+0 (GMT 0)

Haho is a village in the Bagassi Department of Balé Province in southern Burkina Faso.

Population
Year	Pop.	±%
1985	236	—
2006	498	+111.0%
2019	512	+2.8%
