= Air Inter Gabon =

Scheduled and charter airline in Gabon

IATA	ICAO	Call sign
GB	AIG	—
- Founded: 1956
- Ceased operations: 2001
- Hubs: Port-Gentil International Airport, Gabon
- Fleet size: See Fleet below

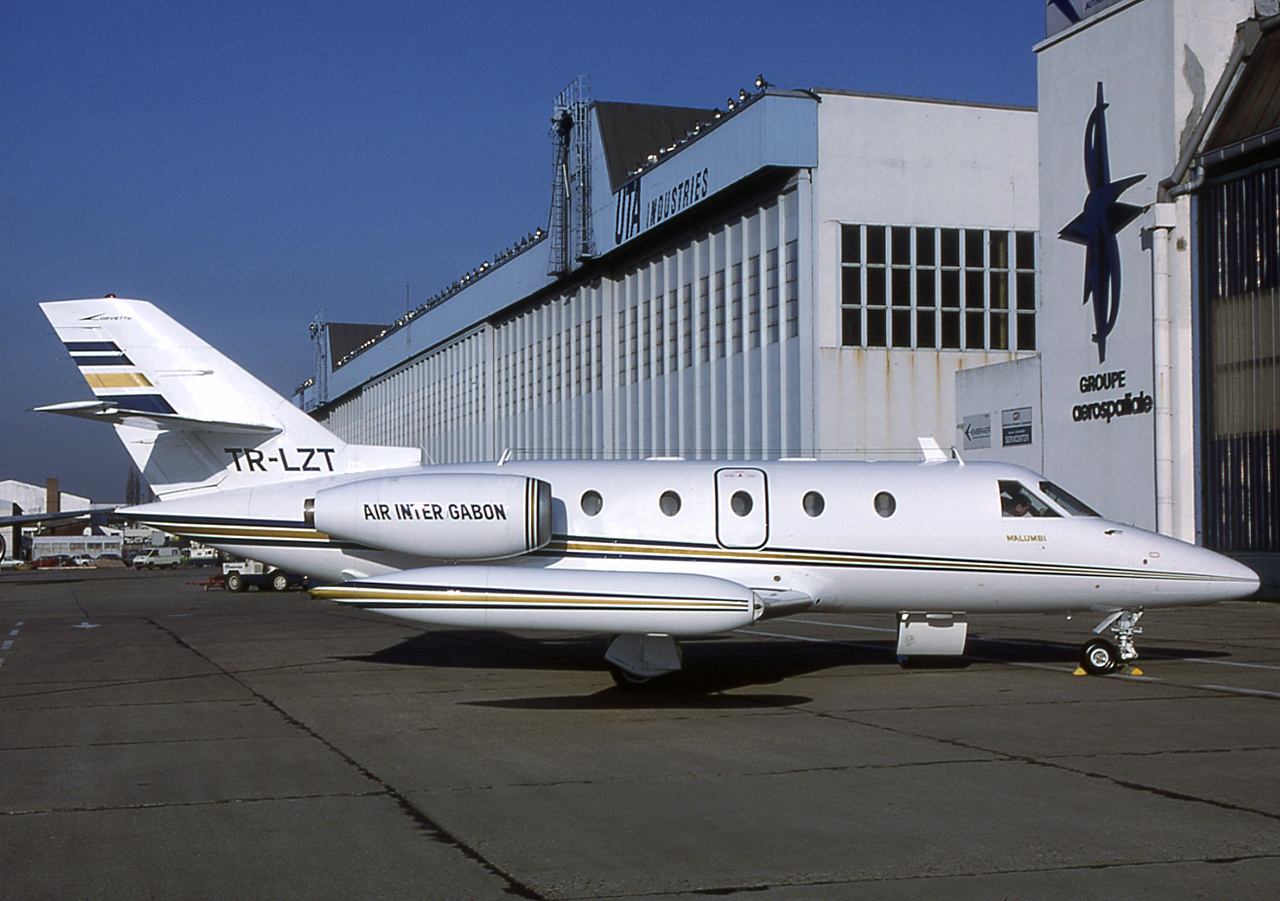
Air Inter Gabon Aérospatiale Corvette

Air Inter Gabon was a scheduled and charter airline based in Port-Gentil, Gabon that has since ended all operations.

== History ==
Air Inter Gabon was founded in 1956 as a subsidiary of Air Gabon. The airline initially operated charter flights, with scheduled flights begun in 1961. The airline's first scheduled route connected Port-Gentil with Lambaréné in Moyen-Ogooué Province. The airline later extended scheduled flights to Fougamou, Gamba, Iguela, Libreville, Mandji, Manega, Mayumba, Mevong, Nkon, Omboue, Ouanga, Setté Cama and Tchibanga. Operations ended in 2001.
