= Séréna =

- Location within Burkina Faso
- Coordinates: 12°4′N 3°5′W
- Country: Burkina Faso
- Region: Boucle du Mouhoun Region
- Province: Balé Province
- Department: Oury Department

Population (2019)
  - Total: 3,079
- Time zone: UTC+0 (GMT)

Séréna is a town in the Oury Department of Balé Province in southern Burkina Faso.

Population
Year	Pop.	±%
1985	1,456	—
2006	2,306	+58.4%
2019	3,079	+33.5%
