= Fegué =

- Location in Burkina Faso
- Coordinates: 11°50′N 3°12′W
- Country: Burkina Faso
- Region: Boucle du Mouhoun Region
- Province: Balé
- Department: Pompoï Department

Population (2019)
  - Total: 224
- Time zone: UTC+0 (GMT)

Fegué is a village in the Pompoï Department of Balé Province in southern Burkina Faso.

Population
Year	Pop.	±%
1985	157	—
2006	168	+7.0%
2019	224	+33.3%
