= Voho =

- Location in Burkina Faso
- Coordinates: 11°37′N 3°21′W
- Country: Burkina Faso
- Region: Boucle du Mouhoun Region
- Province: Balé
- Department: Pâ Department

Population (2019)
  - Total: 1,031

Voho is a town in the Pâ Department of Balé Province in south-western Burkina Faso.

Population
Year	Pop.	±%
1985	1,044	—
2006	1,343	+28.6%
2019	1,031	−23.2%
