= Bassana =

Coordinates: 11°55′N 3°20′W

- Interactive map of Bassana
- Country: Burkina Faso
- Region: Boucle du Mouhoun Region
- Province: Balé
- Department: Bana Department

Population (2019)
  - Total: 1,442

Bassana is a village in the Bana Department of Balé Province in south-western Burkina Faso.

Population
Year	Pop.	±%
1985	514	—
2006	985	+91.6%
2019	1,442	+46.4%
