= Ouona =

- Location in Burkina Faso
- Coordinates: 11°58′N 3°26′W
- Country: Burkina Faso
- Region: Boucle du Mouhoun Region
- Province: Balé
- Department: Bana Department

Population (2019)
  - Total: 5,498

Ouona is a town in the Bana Department of Balé Province in south-western Burkina Faso.

Population
Year	Pop.	±%
1985	1,717	—
2006	3,035	+76.8%
2019	5,498	+81.2%
