= Poura-village =

- Country: Burkina Faso
- Region: Boucle du Mouhoun Region
- Province: Balé
- Department: Poura Department

Population (2019)
  - Total: 1,707

Poura-village is a village in the Poura Department of Balé Province in southern Burkina Faso.

Population
Year	Pop.	±%
1985	1,030	—
2006	883	−14.3%
2019	1,707	+93.3%
