= Sani, Burkina Faso =

Sani
- Location within Burkina Faso
- Coordinates: 12°4′N 3°7′W
- Country: Burkina Faso
- Region: Boucle du Mouhoun Region
- Province: Balé Province
- Department: Oury Department

Population (2019)
  - Total: 2,042
- Time zone: UTC+0 (GMT)

Sani is a town in the Oury Department of Balé Province in southern Burkina Faso.

Population
Year	Pop.	±%
1985	841	—
2006	1,594	+89.5%
2019	2,042	+28.1%
