= Danao =

Danao may refer to:

== Places ==
- Danao, Bohol, Philippines
- Danao, Cebu, Philippines
- Danao, a barangay in Pototan, Iloilo, Philippines
- Danao, a barangay in Janiuay, Iloilo, Philippines
- Danao-Danao Island, Iloilo

== People ==
- Bimbo Danao (1915 – 1967), Filipino actor
- Johnoy Danao, Filipino independent musician, composer, and singer-songwriter
- Kiwi Alejandro Danao Camara (b. 1984), Filipino-American attorney
- Pilar Manalo Danao (1914 - 1987), Filipino choir director

== Other uses ==
- Danao languages, group of Austronesian languages of the Philippines, including Maguindanao, Maranao and Iranun
- Lake Danao (disambiguation)

== See also ==
- Danau (disambiguation)
- Danou (disambiguation)
- Lake Danao (disambiguation)
- Davao (disambiguation)
