= Ouroubono =

- Location in Burkina Faso
- Coordinates: 11°42′N 2°56′W
- Country: Burkina Faso
- Region: Boucle du Mouhoun Region
- Province: Balé
- Department: Boromo Department

Population (2019)
  - Total: 2,692

Ouroubono is a town in the Boromo Department of Balé Province in southern Burkina Faso.

Population
Year	Pop.	±%
1985	1,101	—
2006	1,736	+57.7%
2019	2,692	+55.1%
