= Kopoï =

- Location in Burkina Faso
- Coordinates: 11°36′N 3°23′W
- Country: Burkina Faso
- Region: Boucle du Mouhoun Region
- Province: Balé
- Department: Pâ Department

Population (2019)
  - Total: 2,019

Kopoï is a town in the Pâ Department of Balé Province in south-western Burkina Faso.

Population
| Year | Pop. | ±% |
|---|---|---|
| 1985 | 1,709 | — |
| 2006 | 2,916 | +70.6% |
| 2019 | 2,019 | −30.8% |
