= Pahin =

- Location in Burkina Faso
- Coordinates: 11°43′N 3°14′W
- Country: Burkina Faso
- Region: Boucle du Mouhoun Region
- Province: Balé
- Department: Bagassi Department

Population (2019)
  - Total: 1,846
- Time zone: UTC+0 (GMT 0)

Pahin is a town in the Bagassi Department of Balé Province in southern Burkina Faso.

Population
Year	Pop.	±%
1985	1,032	—
2006	1,687	+63.5%
2019	1,846	+9.4%
