= Bitiako =

Coordinates: 11°49′N 3°01′W

- Interactive map of Bitiako
- Country: Burkina Faso
- Region: Boucle du Mouhoun Region
- Province: Balé
- Department: Siby Department

Population (2019)
  - Total: 1,737
- Time zone: UTC+0 (GMT 0)

Bitiako is a town in the Siby Department of Balé Province in south-western Burkina Faso.

Population
Year	Pop.	±%
1985	1,013	—
2006	2,226	+119.7%
2019	1,737	−22.0%
