= Niaga, Burkina Faso =

Niaga
- Location in Burkina Faso
- Coordinates: 11°42′N 3°9′W
- Country: Burkina Faso
- Region: Boucle du Mouhoun Region
- Province: Balé
- Department: Bagassi Department

Population (2019)
  - Total: 835
- Time zone: UTC+0 (GMT 0)

Niaga is a village in the Bagassi Department of Balé Province in southern Burkina Faso.

Population
Year	Pop.	±%
2006	630	—
2019	835	+32.5%
