= Sipohin =

- Location in Burkina Faso
- Coordinates: 11°44′N 3°18′W
- Country: Burkina Faso
- Region: Boucle du Mouhoun Region
- Province: Balé
- Department: Bagassi Department

Population (2019)
  - Total: 1,320

Sipohin is a village in the Bagassi Department of Balé Province in southern Burkina Faso.

Population
| Year | Pop. | ±% |
|---|---|---|
| 1985 | 552 | — |
| 2006 | 918 | +66.3% |
| 2019 | 1,320 | +43.8% |
