= Soubouy =

Soubouy Soubouye
- Location within Burkina Faso
- Coordinates: 11°51′N 3°8′W
- Country: Burkina Faso
- Region: Boucle du Mouhoun Region
- Province: Balé Province
- Department: Oury Department

Population (2019)
  - Total: 1,502
- Time zone: UTC+0 (GMT)

Soubouy is a town in the Oury Department of Balé Province in southern Burkina Faso.

Population
Year	Pop.	±%
1985	1,167	—
2006	1,456	+24.8%
2019	1,502	+3.2%
