= Virou =

- Location in Burkina Faso
- Coordinates: 11°42′N 2°58′W
- Country: Burkina Faso
- Region: Boucle du Mouhoun Region
- Province: Balé
- Department: Boromo Department

Population (2019)
  - Total: 1,433

Virou is a town in the Boromo Department of Balé Province in southern Burkina Faso.

Population
Year	Pop.	±%
1985	923	—
2006	1,449	+57.0%
2019	1,433	−1.1%
