= Niakongo =

- Location in Burkina Faso
- Coordinates: 11°50′N 3°20′W
- Country: Burkina Faso
- Region: Boucle du Mouhoun Region
- Province: Balé
- Department: Bagassi Department

Population (2019)
  - Total: 1,382
- Time zone: UTC+0 (GMT 0)

Niakongo is a village in the Bagassi Department of Balé Province in southern Burkina Faso.

Population
Year	Pop.	±%
1985	580	—
2006	1,117	+92.6%
2019	1,382	+23.7%
