= Manzoulé =

- Country: Burkina Faso
- Region: Boucle du Mouhoun Region
- Province: Balé
- Department: Bagassi Department

Population (2019)
  - Total: 493
- Time zone: UTC+0 (GMT 0)

Manzoulé is a village in the Bagassi Department of Balé Province in southern Burkina Faso.

Population
Year	Pop.	±%
1985	200	—
2006	308	+54.0%
2019	493	+60.1%
