= Koupelé =

- Country: Burkina Faso
- Region: Boucle du Mouhoun Region
- Province: Balé
- Department: Pâ Department

Population (2019)
  - Total: 1,003

Koupelé is a village in the Pâ Department of Balé Province in south-western Burkina Faso.

Population
Year	Pop.	±%
2006	2,869	—
2019	1,003	−65.0%
