= Pani, Burkina Faso =

Coordinates: 11°35′N 2°20′W

Pani
- Interactive map of Pani
- Country: Burkina Faso
- Region: Boucle du Mouhoun Region
- Province: Balé
- Department: Pompoï Department

Population (2019)
  - Total: 254
- Time zone: UTC+0 (GMT)

Pani, Burkina Faso is a village in the Pompoï Department of Balé Province in southern Burkina Faso.

Population
Year	Pop.	±%
1985	51	—
2006	189	+270.6%
2019	254	+34.4%
