= Oullo =

- Country: Burkina Faso
- Region: Boucle du Mouhoun Region
- Province: Balé Province
- Department: Oury Department

Population (2019)
  - Total: 3,164
- Time zone: UTC+0 (GMT)

Oullo is a town in the Oury Department of Balé Province in southern Burkina Faso.

Population
Year	Pop.	±%
1985	1,564	—
2006	2,291	+46.5%
2019	3,164	+38.1%
