= Kankélé =

- Country: Burkina Faso
- Region: Boucle du Mouhoun Region
- Province: Balé
- Department: Poura Department

Population (2019)
  - Total: 1,238

Kankélé is a village in the Poura Department of Balé Province in southern Burkina Faso.

Population
Year	Pop.	±%
1985	460	—
2006	2,012	+337.4%
2019	1,238	−38.5%
