= Mana, Burkina Faso =

Mana
- Location in Burkina Faso
- Coordinates: 11°52′N 3°22′W
- Country: Burkina Faso
- Region: Boucle du Mouhoun Region
- Province: Balé
- Department: Bagassi Department

Population (2019)
  - Total: 2,312
- Time zone: UTC+0 (GMT 0)

Mana is a town in the Bagassi Department of Balé Province in southern Burkina Faso.

Population
Year	Pop.	±%
1985	1,199	—
2006	2,102	+75.3%
2019	2,312	+10.0%
