= Sokoura, Balé =

Sokoura
- Location in Burkina Faso
- Coordinates: 11°53′N 3°20′W
- Country: Burkina Faso
- Region: Boucle du Mouhoun Region
- Province: Balé
- Department: Bagassi Department

Population (2019)
  - Total: 637

Sokoura is a village in the Bagassi Department of Balé Province in southern Burkina Faso.

Population
Year	Pop.	±%
1985	143	—
2006	421	+194.4%
2019	637	+51.3%
