= Mou, Burkina Faso =

Mou
- Location within Burkina Faso
- Coordinates: 11°59′N 2°58′W
- Country: Burkina Faso
- Region: Boucle du Mouhoun Region
- Province: Balé Province
- Department: Oury Department

Population (2019)
  - Total: 1,424
- Time zone: UTC+0 (GMT)

Mou is a town in the Oury Department of Balé Province in southern Burkina Faso.

Population
Year	Pop.	±%
1985	1,084	—
2006	1,200	+10.7%
2019	1,424	+18.7%
