= Ballao, Burkina Faso =

Ballao
- Location within Burkina Faso
- Coordinates: 11°51′25″N 2°57′06″W
- Country: Burkina Faso
- Region: Boucle du Mouhoun Region
- Province: Balé
- Department: Siby Department

Population (2019)
  - Total: 1,856
- Time zone: UTC+0 (GMT 0)

Ballao is a town in the Siby Department of Balé Province in south-western Burkina Faso.

Population
Year	Pop.	±%
1985	544	—
2006	1,799	+230.7%
2019	1,856	+3.2%
