= Siguinoguin =

Coordinates: 13°38′N 2°39′W

- Interactive map of Siguinoguin
- Country: Burkina Faso
- Region: Boucle du Mouhoun Region
- Province: Balé
- Department: Boromo Department

Population (2019)
  - Total: 1,445

Siguinoguin is a town in the Boromo Department of Balé Province in south-western Burkina Faso.

Population
Year	Pop.	±%
2006	969	—
2019	1,445	+49.1%
