= Boromissi =

Boromissi Boromossi
- Country: Burkina Faso
- Region: Boucle du Mouhoun Region
- Province: Balé
- Department: Siby Department

Population (2019)
  - Total: 814
- Time zone: UTC+0 (GMT 0)

Boromissi is a village in the Siby Department of Balé Province in south-western Burkina Faso.

Population
Year	Pop.	±%
1985	593	—
2006	2,422	+308.4%
2019	814	−66.4%
