= Fofina =

- Country: Burkina Faso
- Region: Boucle du Mouhoun Region
- Province: Balé
- Department: Bana Department

Population (2019)
  - Total: 372

Fofina is a village in the Bana Department of Balé Province in south-western Burkina Faso.

Population
Year	Pop.	±%
2006	191	—
2019	372	+94.8%
