= Hérédougou =

- Country: Burkina Faso
- Region: Boucle du Mouhoun Region
- Province: Balé
- Department: Pâ Department

Population (2019)
  - Total: 1,191

Hérédougou is a village in the Pâ Department of Balé Province in south-western Burkina Faso.

Population
Year	Pop.	±%
2006	3,609	—
2019	1,191	−67.0%
