= Darsalam =

Darsalam, Dar Salam or various forms of the spelling may refer to tens of settlements in Africa.

== Burkina Faso ==
- Darsalam, Balé
- Darsalam, Ganzourgou
- Darsalam, Gnagna
- Darsalam, Solenzo
- Darsalam, Tansila

== Comoros ==
- Darsalam, Comoros

== Guinea ==
- Dar Salam, Kindia
- Dar Salam. Dubreka
- Dar Salam, Kankan
