= Momino =

Momino (Cyrillic Момино) may refer to:

- Momino, Haskovo Province, village in Haskovo Province, Bulgaria
- Momino, Targovishte Province, village in Targovishte Province, Bulgaria
- Momino Selo, Plovdiv province, see List of Turkish exonyms in Bulgaria
- Momino Point, Antarctica

== See also ==
- Momina (disambiguation)
