= Bandio =

- Location in Burkina Faso
- Coordinates: 11°41′N 3°16′W
- Country: Burkina Faso
- Region: Boucle du Mouhoun Region
- Province: Balé
- Department: Bagassi Department

Population (2019)
  - Total: 1,821
- Time zone: UTC+0 (GMT 0)

Bandio is a small town in the Bagassi Department of Balé Province in southern Burkina Faso.

Population
Year	Pop.	±%
1985	752	—
2006	1,572	+109.0%
2019	1,821	+15.8%
