= Taplara =

- Country: Burkina Faso
- Region: Boucle du Mouhoun Region
- Province: Balé Province
- Department: Oury Department

Population (2019)
  - Total: 516
- Time zone: UTC+0 (GMT)

Taplara is a village in the Oury Department of Balé Province in southern Burkina Faso.

Population
Year	Pop.	±%
2006	382	—
2019	516	+35.1%
