= Mouhoun III =

- Country: Burkina Faso
- Region: Boucle du Mouhoun Region
- Province: Balé
- Department: Poura Department

Population (2019)
  - Total: 600

Mouhoun III is a village in the Poura Department of Balé Province in southern Burkina Faso.

Population
Year	Pop.	±%
2006	2,015	—
2019	600	−70.2%
