= Konkoliko =

- Location in Burkina Faso
- Coordinates: 11°58′N 3°20′W
- Country: Burkina Faso
- Region: Boucle du Mouhoun Region
- Province: Balé
- Department: Pompoï Department

Population (2019)
  - Total: 2,351
- Time zone: UTC+0 (GMT)

Konkoliko is a town in the Pompoï Department of Balé Province in southern Burkina Faso.

Population
| Year | Pop. | ±% |
|---|---|---|
| 1985 | 1,150 | — |
| 2006 | 1,786 | +55.3% |
| 2019 | 2,351 | +31.6% |
