= Moko =

Moko may refer to:

- Moko (dolphin), a male bottlenose dolphin that associated with New Zealanders from 2007 to 2010
- Moko (mythology), a character in the mythology of Mangaia in the Cook Islands
- Moko, Burkina Faso, a village
- Moko drums, Asian bronze drums
- MOKO, a shopping mall in Grand Century Place, east Mong Kok, Hong Kong
- A banana disease caused by Ralstonia solanacearum
- Tā moko, Māori skin markings akin to tattoos often referred to as moko

== People ==
- Moko (Tapuika) (17th century), a Maori tribal leader
- Mokō (born 1990), a Japanese YouTuber
- Nadiah Adu-Gyamfi (born 1991), a British soul singer, previously known by the stage-name "Moko"
- Moko, a pen-name of Sidney Moko Mead, New Zealand author
- Peter Moko, a New Zealand rugby league footballer
- Pita Moko (1885–1943), a New Zealand land agent

== See also ==
- Moko skink (Oligosoma moco), a species of skink in the family Scincidae
