= Solonso =

- Country: Burkina Faso
- Region: Boucle du Mouhoun Region
- Province: Balé
- Department: Bana Department

Population (2019)
  - Total: 1,191

Solonso is a village in the Bana Department of Balé Province in south-western Burkina Faso.

Population
| Year | Pop. | ±% |
|---|---|---|
| 1985 | 421 | — |
| 2006 | 791 | +87.9% |
| 2019 | 1,191 | +50.6% |
