= Kahin =

- Location in Burkina Faso
- Coordinates: 11°48′N 3°21′W
- Country: Burkina Faso
- Region: Boucle du Mouhoun Region
- Province: Balé
- Department: Bagassi Department

Population (2019)
  - Total: 1,608
- Time zone: UTC+0 (GMT 0)

Kahin is a town in the Bagassi Department of Balé Province in southwestern Burkina Faso.

Population
Year	Pop.	±%
1985	805	—
2006	1,390	+72.7%
2019	1,608	+15.7%
