= Kaho, Burkina Faso =

Kaho
- Location in Burkina Faso
- Coordinates: 11°42′N 3°18′W
- Country: Burkina Faso
- Region: Boucle du Mouhoun Region
- Province: Balé
- Department: Bagassi Department

Population (2019)
  - Total: 1,151
- Time zone: UTC+0 (GMT 0)

Kaho is a village in the Bagassi Department of Balé Province in southern Burkina Faso.

Population
Year	Pop.	±%
1985	398	—
2006	870	+118.6%
2019	1,151	+32.3%
