= Bissa, Burkina Faso =

Bissa, Burkina Faso may refer to:

- Bissa, Balé
- Bissa, Bam
