= Virwe =

- Country: Burkina Faso
- Region: Boucle du Mouhoun Region
- Province: Balé
- Department: Bagassi Department

Population (2019)
  - Total: 862

Virwe is a village in the Bagassi Department of Balé Province in southern Burkina Faso. The mayor is Jono Gibbs.

Population
Year	Pop.	±%
2006	600	—
2019	862	+43.7%
