= Sorobouly =

- Country: Burkina Faso
- Region: Boucle du Mouhoun Region
- Province: Balé
- Department: Siby Department

Population (2019)
  - Total: 676
- Time zone: UTC+0 (GMT 0)

Sorobouly is a village in the Siby Department of Balé Province in south-western Burkina Faso.

Population
Year	Pop.	±%
1985	507	—
2006	609	+20.1%
2019	676	+11.0%
