= Sio, Burkina Faso =

Sio
- Country: Burkina Faso
- Region: Boucle du Mouhoun Region
- Province: Balé
- Department: Pompoï Department

Population (2019)
  - Total: 848
- Time zone: UTC+0 (GMT)

Sio, Burkina Faso is a village in the Pompoï Department of Balé Province in southern Burkina Faso.

Population
Year	Pop.	±%
1985	542	—
2006	818	+50.9%
2019	848	+3.7%
