= Boromo Department =

Coordinates: 11°45′N 2°55′W

Boromo
- Department
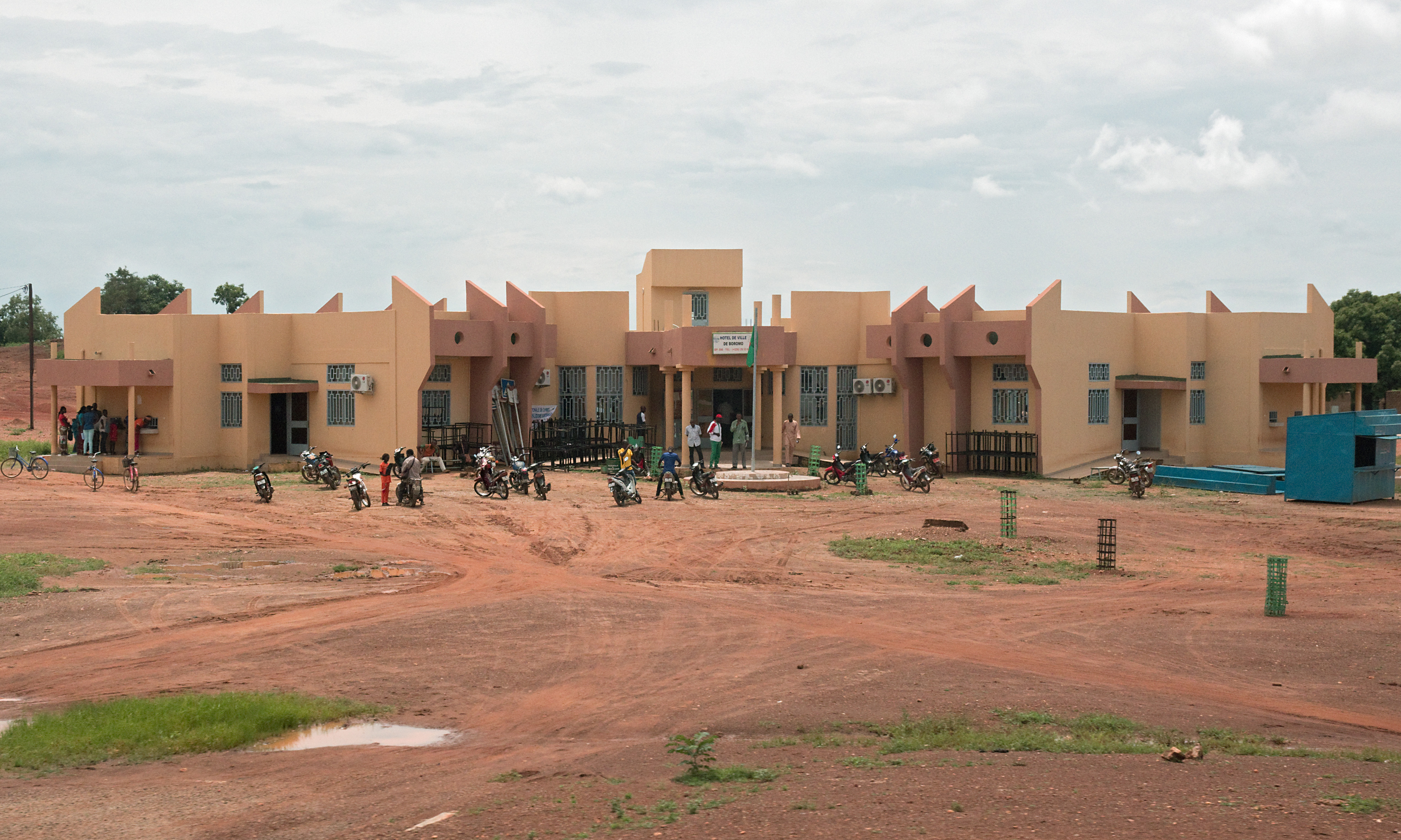
- Municipal administration building (September 2018)

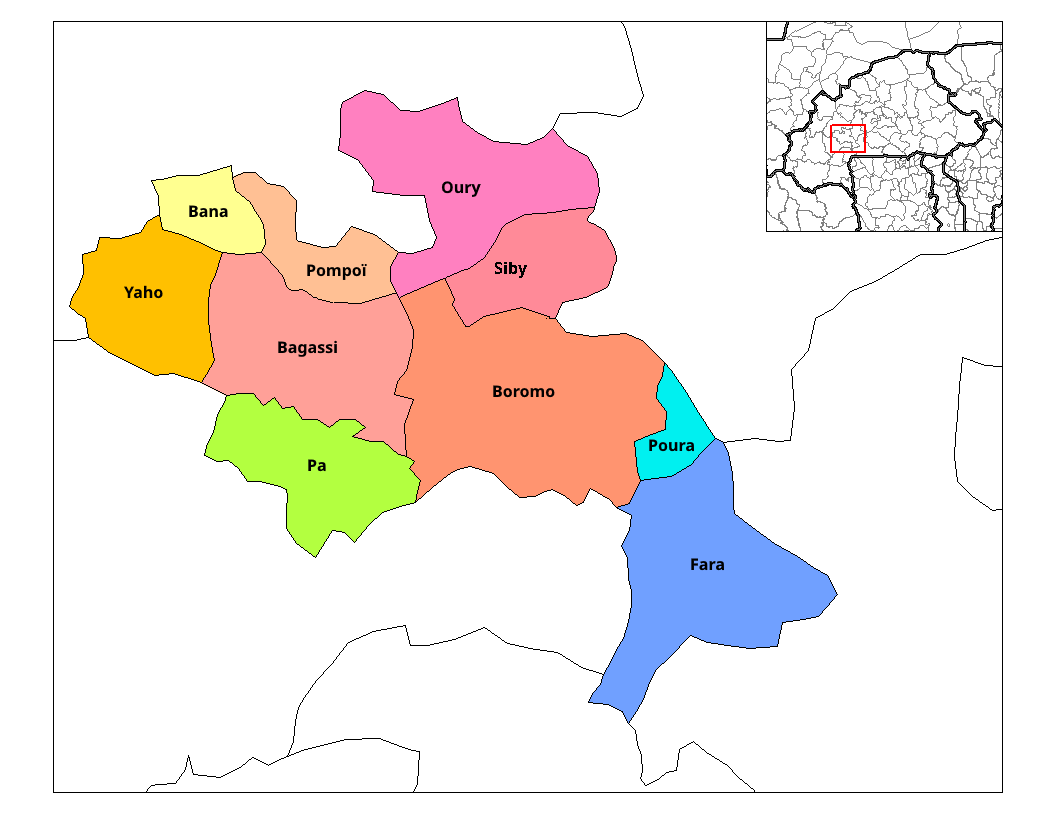
- Boromo Department location in the province
- Country: Burkina Faso
- Province: Balé

Area
  - Department: 371 sq mi (962 km^{2})

Population (2019)
  - Department: 40,228
  - Density: 108/sq mi (41.8/km^{2})
  - Urban: 20,193
- Time zone: UTC+0 (GMT 0)

Boromo is a department of Balé Province in southern Burkina Faso. Its capital is the town of Boromo. According to the 2019 census the department has a population of 40,228.

== Towns and villages ==
Towns and villages and populations in the department are as follows:

- Boromo (11 694 inhabitants) (capital)
- Koho (1 903 inhabitants)
- Lapara (2 648 inhabitants)
- Nanou (2 376 inhabitants)
- Ouahabou (5 601 inhabitants)
- Ouako (842 inhabitants)
- Ouroubono (1 511 inhabitants)
- Siguinoguin (1 407 inhabitants)
- Virou (1 001 inhabitants)
