= Pâ Department =

Coordinates: 11°33′N 3°15′W

Pâ
- Department
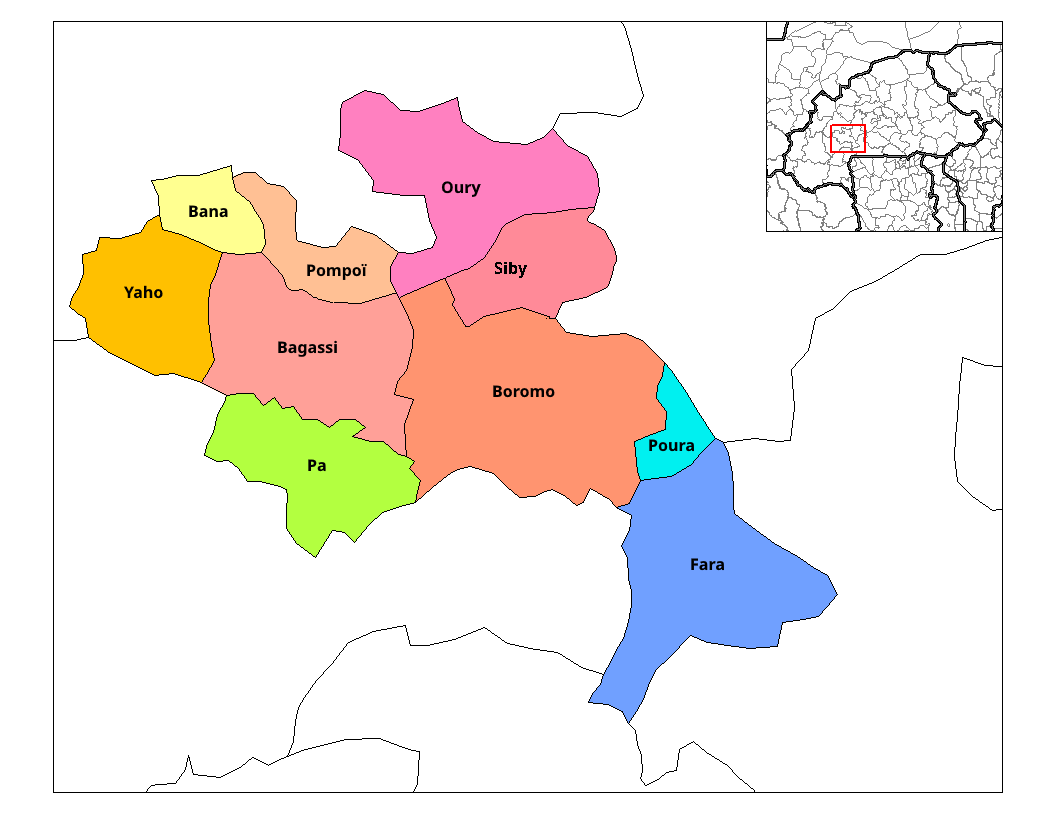
- Pâ Department location in the province
- Country: Burkina Faso
- Province: Balé

Area
  - Total: 155.8 sq mi (403.4 km^{2})

Population (2019 census)
  - Total: 27,011
  - Density: 173.4/sq mi (66.96/km^{2})
- Time zone: UTC+0 (GMT 0)

Pâ is a department or commune of Balé Province in southern Burkina Faso. Its capital is the town of Pâ. According to the 2019 census the department has a total population of 27,011.

== Towns and villages ==
Largest towns and villages and populations in the department are as follows:

- Pâ (15 170 inhabitants) (capital)
- Boro (1 300 inhabitants)
- Didié (1 234 inhabitants)
- Hérédougou (957 inhabitants)
- Kopoï (2 493 inhabitants)
- Koupelé (731 inhabitants)
- Voho (1 453 inhabitants)
- Yamané (1 820 inhabitants)
