= Siby, Burkina Faso =

Coordinates: 11°51′N 2°58′W

Siby
- Small town (or large village)
- Interactive map of Siby
- Country: Burkina Faso
- Region: Boucle du Mouhoun Region
- Province: Balé
- Department: Siby Department

Population (2019)
  - Total: 6,821
- Time zone: UTC+0 (GMT 0)

Siby is a town in the Siby Department of Balé Province in south-western Burkina Faso.

Population
Year	Pop.	±%
1985	3,340	—
2006	1,841	−44.9%
2019	6,821	+270.5%
