= Pompoï =

- Location in Burkina Faso
- Coordinates: 11°52′N 3°14′W
- Country: Burkina Faso
- Region: Boucle du Mouhoun Region
- Province: Balé
- Department: Pompoï Department

Population (2019)
  - Total: 3,655

Pompoï is the capital of the Pompoï Department of Balé Province in southern Burkina Faso.

Population
Year	Pop.	±%
1985	2,543	—
2006	2,836	+11.5%
2019	3,655	+28.9%
