= Bissa, Balé =

Bissa
- Location in Burkina Faso
- Coordinates: 11°55′N 3°27′W
- Country: Burkina Faso
- Region: Boucle du Mouhoun Region
- Province: Balé
- Department: Bana Department

Population (2019)
  - Total: 715

Bissa is a village in the Bana Department of Balé Province in south-western Burkina Faso.

Population
Year	Pop.	±%
1985	216	—
2006	416	+92.6%
2019	715	+71.9%
