= Poura Department =

Coordinates: 11°37′N 2°45′W

Poura
- Department
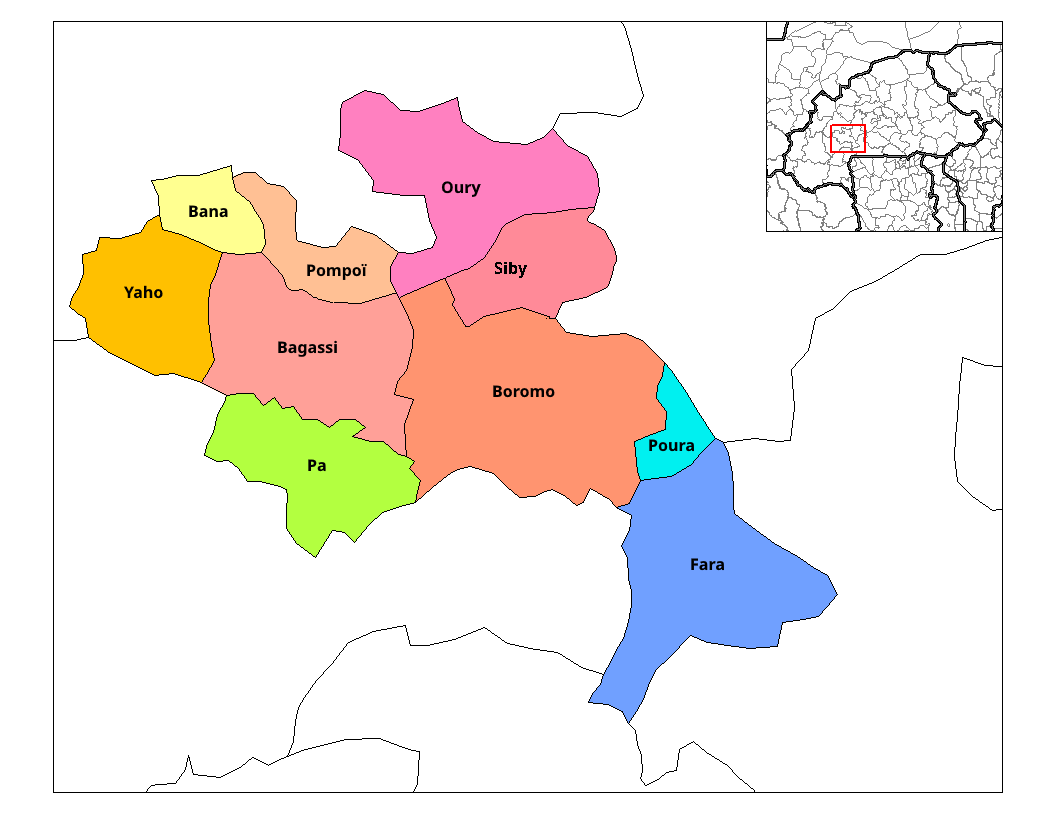
- Poura Department location in the province
- Country: Burkina Faso
- Province: Balé

Population (1996)
  - Total: 9,761
- Time zone: UTC+0 (GMT 0)

Poura is a small department or commune of Balé Province in south-eastern Burkina Faso. Its capital lies at the town of Poura. According to the 1996 census, the department had a total population of 9,761.

== Towns and villages ==
Largest towns and villages and populations in the department are as follows:

- Poura (5 883 inhabitants) (capital)
- Basnéré (386 inhabitants)
- Darsalam (587 inhabitants)
- Kankélé (591 inhabitants)
- Mouhoun III (233 inhabitants)
- Poura-village (1 069 inhabitants)
- Pig-poré (637 inhabitants)
- Toécin (375 inhabitants)
