= Bagassi =

- Location in Burkina Faso
- Coordinates: 11°45′N 3°18′W
- Country: Burkina Faso
- Region: Boucle du Mouhoun Region
- Province: Balé
- Department: Bagassi Department

Population (2019)
  - Total: 3,992
- Time zone: UTC+0 (GMT 0)

Bagassi is the capital of the Bagassi Department of Balé Province in southern Burkina Faso.

Population
Year	Pop.	±%
1985	2,555	—
2006	638	−75.0%
2019	3,992	+525.7%

== History ==
Louis-Gustave Binger entered the village on 19 May 1888, writing:

Bangassi, which we reached at five in the evening, is a large village of 1,000 to 1,500 inhabitants, all Bobo-Niéniégué. The inhabitants appeared to me to be reasonably well-off. The village has very extensive crops and a fine herd of cattle (around 300 head). This region is very poor in water; there is neither stream nor river, and water is drawn from numerous wells sometimes situated nearly a kilometre from the villages. At Bangassi, throughout the night the women did nothing but draw and carry water; it is difficult to find rest in this village, so around two in the morning my men, giving up on sleep, begged me to set off.

He departed the following day.
