= Pompoï Department =

Coordinates: 11°52′N 3°14′W

Pompoï
- Department
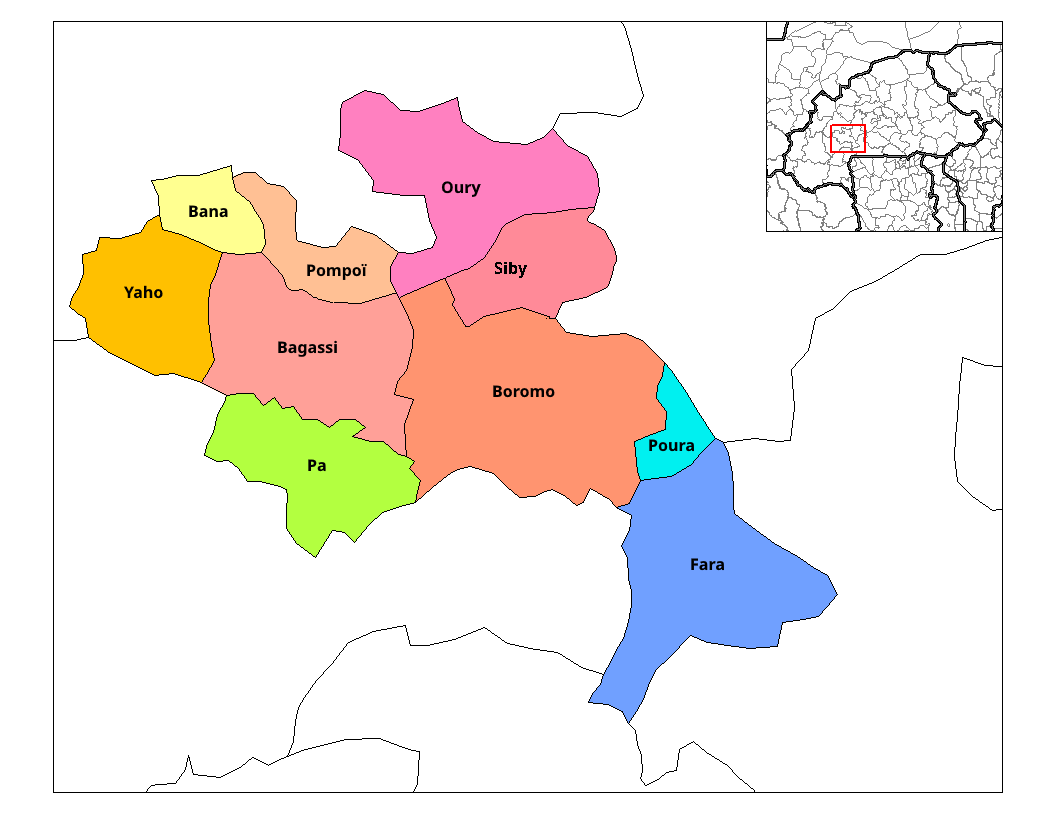
- Pompoï Department location in the province
- Country: Burkina Faso
- Province: Balé

Population (2019 census)
  - Total: 14,067
- Time zone: UTC+0 (GMT 0)

Pompoï is a department or commune of Balé Province in southern Burkina Faso. Its capital lies at the town of Pompoï. According to the 2019 census the commune has a total population of 14,067.

== Towns and villages ==
Largest towns and villages and populations in the department are as follows:

- Pompoï (2 710 inhabitants) (capital)
- Battiti (522 inhabitants)
- Fegué (152 inhabitants)
- Kietou (357 inhabitants)
- Kokoï (1 027 inhabitants)
- Konkoliko (1 898 inhabitants)
- Pana (812 inhabitants)
- Pani (158 inhabitants)
- Pompoï-gare (894 inhabitants)
- San (1 320 inhabitants)
- Sio (763 inhabitants)
