= Bana Department =

Coordinates: 12°36′N 3°29′W

Bana
- Department
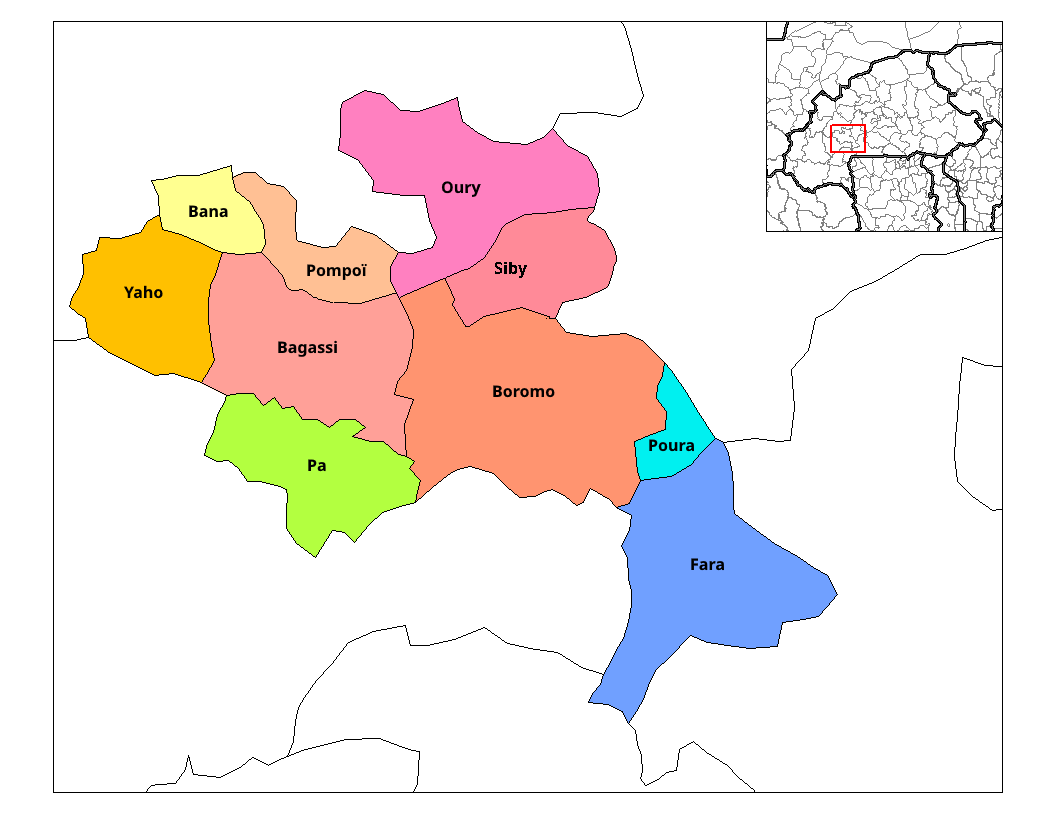
- Bana Department location in the province
- Country: Burkina Faso
- Province: Balé

Population (2019)
  - Total: 19,787
- Time zone: UTC+0 (GMT 0)

Bana is a department or commune of Balé Province in southern Burkina Faso. Its capital lies at the town of Bana. According to the 2019 census the department has a population of 19,787.

== Towns and villages ==
Towns and villages and populations in the department are as follows:

- Bana (2 769 inhabitants) (capital)
- Bassana (918 inhabitants)
- Bissa (357 inhabitants)
- Danou (1 311 inhabitants)
- Fofina (189 inhabitants)
- Ouona (3 170 inhabitants)
- Sienkoro (485 inhabitants)
- Solonso (635 inhabitants)
- Somona (428 inhabitants)
- Yona (2 037 inhabitants)
