= Siby Department =

Coordinates: 11°51′N 2°58′W

Siby
- Department
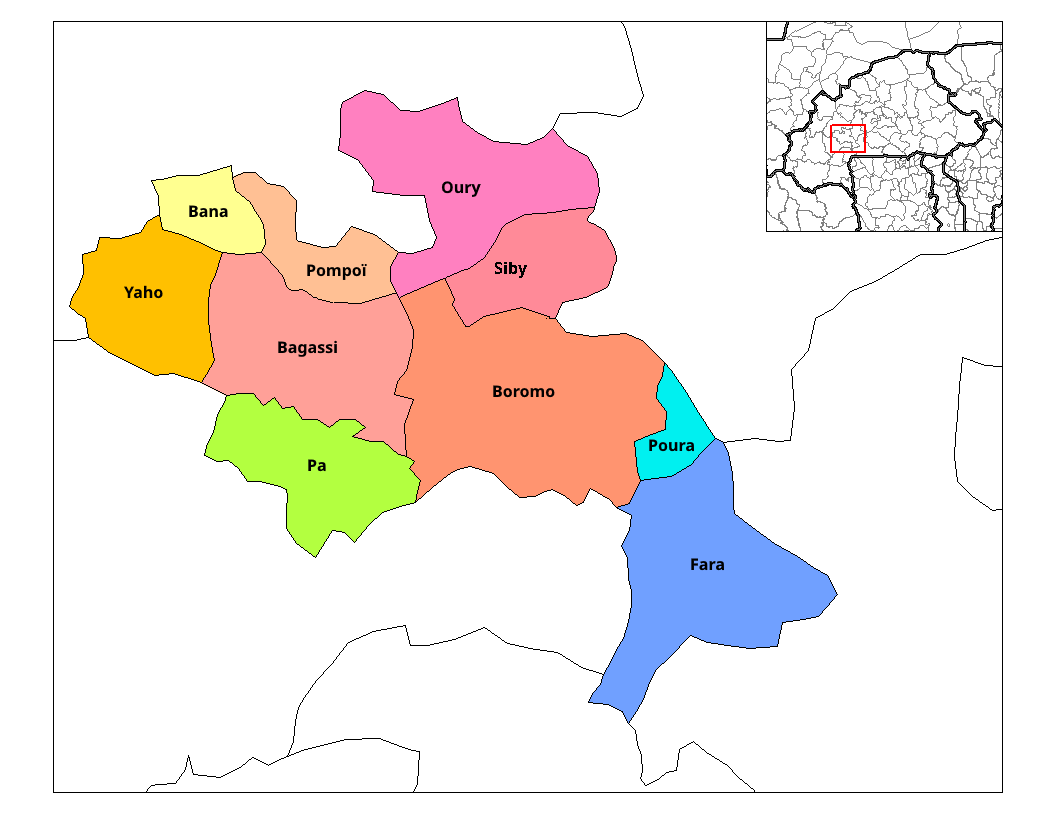
- Siby Department location in the province
- Country: Burkina Faso
- Province: Balé

Population (1996)
  - Total: 12,089
- Time zone: UTC+0 (GMT 0)

Siby is a department or commune of Balé Province in southern Burkina Faso. Its capital lies at the town of Siby. According to the 1996 census the department had a total population of 12,089.

== Towns and villages ==
Largest towns and villages and populations in the department are as follows:

- Siby (3,723 inhabitants) (capital)
- Ballao (1,165 inhabitants)
- Bitiako (1,192 inhabitants)
- Boromissi (736 inhabitants)
- Kalembouly (1,190 inhabitants)
- Sécaco (2,516 inhabitants)
- Sorobouly (632 inhabitants)
- Souho (935 inhabitants)
