= Bissa mine =

One of the largest gold mines in the Burkina Faso

Coordinates: 13°09′47″N 1°30′46″W

- Interactive map of Bissa mine

Location
- Location: Centre-Nord Region, Burkina Faso

Production
- Products: Gold

History
- Opened: 2013

Owner
- Company: Nordgold

The Bissa mine is one of the largest gold mines in the Burkina Faso. The mine is located in the center of the country in Centre-Nord Region. The mine has estimated reserves of 4.9 million oz of gold and is operated by Nordgold.

Between 2011 and 2013, the villages of Imiougou and Bissa were displaced to make way for the mine before its opening in January 2013.
