= Moko, Burkina Faso =

Coordinates: 11°48′N 3°17′W

Moko
- Interactive map of Moko
- Country: Burkina Faso
- Region: Boucle du Mouhoun Region
- Province: Balé
- Department: Bagassi Department

Population (2019)
  - Total: 1,205
- Time zone: UTC+0 (GMT 0)

Moko is a village in the Bagassi Department of Balé Province in southern Burkina Faso.

Population
Year	Pop.	±%
1985	511	—
2006	802	+56.9%
2019	1,205	+50.2%
