= Danou =

- Location in Burkina Faso
- Coordinates: 11°55′N 3°22′W
- Country: Burkina Faso
- Region: Boucle du Mouhoun Region
- Province: Balé
- Department: Bana Department

Population (2019)
  - Total: 1,857

Danou is a town in the Bana Department of Balé Province in south-western Burkina Faso.

Population
Year	Pop.	±%
1985	813	—
2006	1,347	+65.7%
2019	1,857	+37.9%
