= Siou, Burkina Faso =

Siou
- Location in Burkina Faso
- Coordinates: 12°05′N 3°12′W
- Country: Burkina Faso
- Region: Boucle du Mouhoun Region
- Province: Balé
- Department: Fara Department

Population (2019)
  - Total: 3,454
- Time zone: UTC+0 (GMT)

Siou is a town in the Oury Department of Balé Province in southern Burkina Faso.

Population
| Year | Pop. | ±% |
|---|---|---|
| 1985 | 1,642 | — |
| 2006 | 2,520 | +53.5% |
| 2019 | 3,454 | +37.1% |
