= Coho (disambiguation) =

The coho salmon is a species of salmon.

Coho or COHO may also refer to:

- COHO, a radar technique
- MV Coho, a car ferry built in 1959 and operated by Black Ball Lines between Victoria, British Columbia and Port Angeles, Washington
- Coho, code name for Linspire 4.5, a Linux distribution
- CoHo, fan name for author Colleen Hoover

== See also ==
- Jeffrey Coho, a fictional character in the Boston Legal TV series
- Koho (disambiguation)
