= Darsalam, Balé =

Darsalam
- Country: Burkina Faso
- Region: Boucle du Mouhoun Region
- Province: Balé
- Department: Poura Department

Population (2019)
  - Total: 942

Darsalam is a village in the Poura Department of Balé Province in southern Burkina Faso.

Population
Year	Pop.	±%
1985	356	—
2006	1,896	+432.6%
2019	942	−50.3%
