= Yamané, Balé =

Yamané
- Interactive map of Yamané
- Country: Burkina Faso
- Region: Boucle du Mouhoun Region
- Province: Balé
- Department: Pâ Department

Population (2019)
  - Total: 2,932

Yamané is a town in the Pâ Department of Balé Province in south-western Burkina Faso.

Population
Year	Pop.	±%
1985	1,377	—
2006	2,000	+45.2%
2019	2,932	+46.6%
