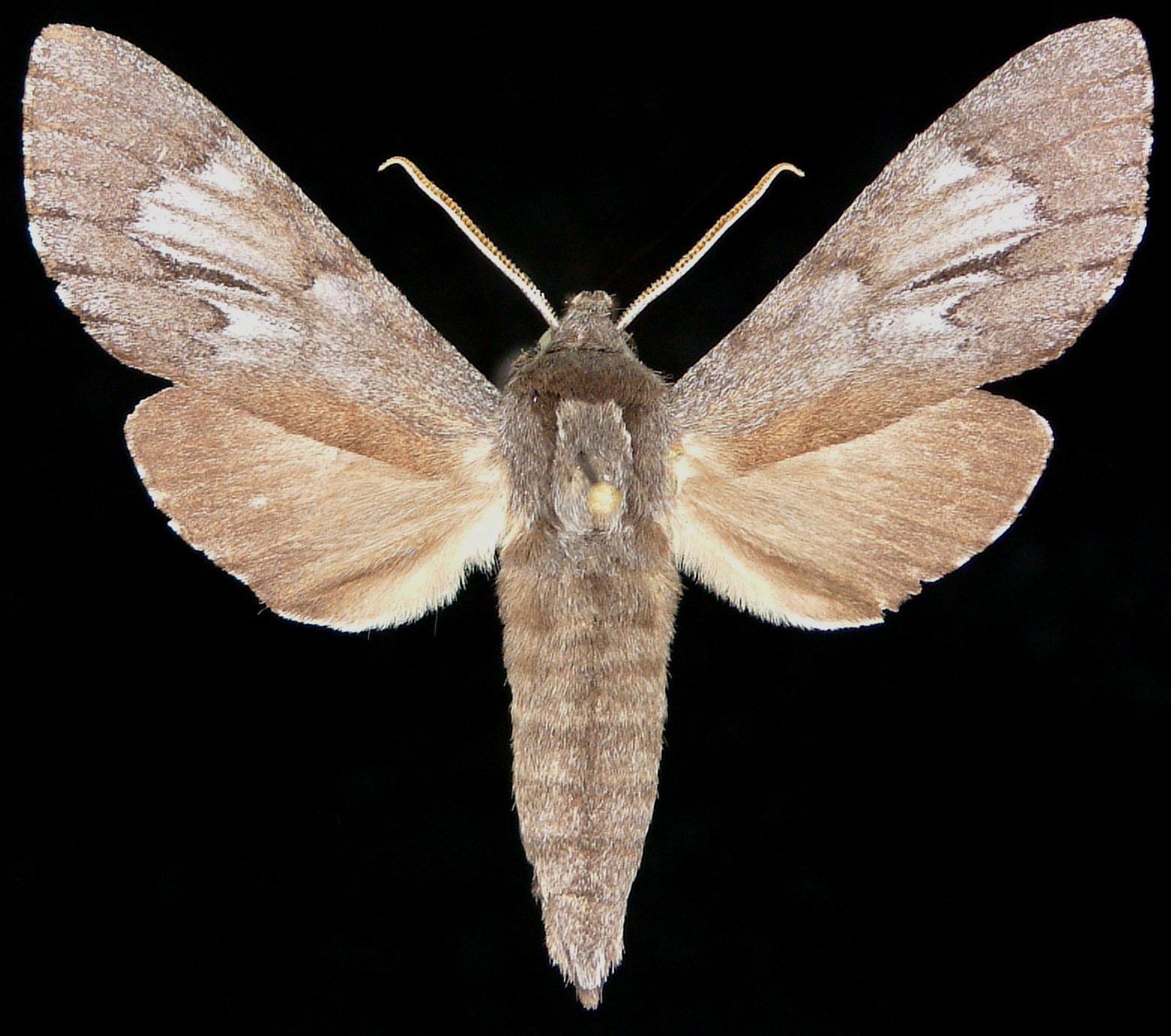

Scientific classification
- Domain: Eukaryota
- Kingdom: Animalia
- Phylum: Arthropoda
- Class: Insecta
- Order: Lepidoptera
- Family: Sphingidae
- Genus: Lapara
- Species: L. phaeobrachycerous

Binomial name
- Lapara phaeobrachycerous Brou, 1994

= Lapara phaeobrachycerous =

Gulf pine sphinx

Species of moth

Lapara phaeobrachycerousus, the Gulf pine sphinx, is a moth of the family Sphingidae. It is known from pine forests in the US states of Mississippi and eastern Louisiana.

The wingspan is 64–78 mm.

There are five generations per year with adults on wing from April to October in Louisiana.

The larvae probably feed on Pinus species, such as Pinus palustris and Pinus taeda.
