= Lapara =

- Country: Burkina Faso
- Region: Boucle du Mouhoun Region
- Province: Balé
- Department: Boromo Department

Population (2019)
  - Total: 1,431

Lapara is a town in the Boromo Department of Balé Province in south-western Burkina Faso.

Population
Year	Pop.	±%
1985	915	—
2006	976	+6.7%
2019	1,431	+46.6%
