= Momina, Burkina Faso =

Momina
- Country: Burkina Faso
- Region: Boucle du Mouhoun Region
- Province: Balé Province
- Department: Oury Department

Population (2019)
  - Total: 790
- Time zone: UTC+0 (GMT)

Momina is a village in the Oury Department of Balé Province in southern Burkina Faso.

Population
Year	Pop.	±%
1985	322	—
2006	507	+57.5%
2019	790	+55.8%
