= Bana, Burkina Faso =

Bana
- Location in Burkina Faso
- Coordinates: 11°55′N 3°23′W
- Country: Burkina Faso
- Region: Boucle du Mouhoun Region
- Province: Balé
- Department: Bana Department

Population (2019)
  - Total: 4,126

Bana is the capital of the Bana Department of Balé Province in southern Burkina Faso.

Population
Year	Pop.	±%
1985	1,772	—
2006	2,943	+66.1%
2019	4,126	+40.2%
