= Koena (Balé Province) =

Koena Kouena
- Location within Burkina Faso
- Coordinates: 11°53′N 3°3′W
- Country: Burkina Faso
- Region: Boucle du Mouhoun Region
- Province: Balé Province
- Department: Oury Department

Population (2019)
  - Total: 1,297
- Time zone: UTC+0 (GMT)

Koena is a town in the Oury Department of Balé Province in southern Burkina Faso.

Population
Year	Pop.	±%
1985	698	—
2006	1,071	+53.4%
2019	1,297	+21.1%
