= Yaro =

Coordinates: 11°15′N 1°12′W

- Interactive map of Yaro
- Country: Burkina Faso
- Region: Boucle du Mouhoun Region
- Province: Balé
- Department: Bagassi Department

Population (2019)
  - Total: 2,286

Yaro is a town in the Bagassi Department of Balé Province in southern Burkina Faso.

Population
Year	Pop.	±%
1985	1,234	—
2006	1,573	+27.5%
2019	2,286	+45.3%
