= Danau =

Danau is the Indonesian and Malay word for "lake". It may refer to:

- Kampong Danau, or simply Danau, a village in Brunei
- Danau language, a Mon-Khmer language in Myanmar (formerly Burma)

== See also ==
- Danao (disambiguation)
- Danou (disambiguation)
