= Ouanga =

- Country: Burkina Faso
- Region: Boucle du Mouhoun Region
- Province: Balé
- Department: Bagassi Department

Population (2019)
  - Total: 855
- Time zone: UTC+0 (GMT 0)

Ouanga is a village in the Bagassi Department of Balé Province in southern Burkina Faso.

Population
Year	Pop.	±%
1985	321	—
2006	511	+59.2%
2019	855	+67.3%
