= Bounou, Bagassi =

Bounou
- Location in Burkina Faso
- Country: Burkina Faso
- Region: Boucle du Mouhoun Region
- Province: Balé
- Department: Bagassi Department

Population (2019)
  - Total: 2,940
- Time zone: UTC+0 (GMT 0)

Bounou is a small town in the Bagassi Department of Balé Province in southern Burkina Faso.

Population
Year	Pop.	±%
1985	1,609	—
2006	2,730	+69.7%
2019	2,940	+7.7%
