= Lake Danao =

Lake Danao may refer to lakes in the Philippines:

- Lake Danao (Cebu) in the province of Cebu
- Lake Danao (Leyte) in the province of Leyte
- Lake Danao (Negros) in the province of Negros Oriental
- Lake Danao, also called Cabilao Island Lake, on Cabilao Island, Bohol

== See also ==
- Danao (disambiguation)
- Lake Lanao, Lanao del Sur
