= Poura =

Poura Poura-Mines
- Location in Burkina Faso
- Coordinates: 11°37′N 2°45′W
- Country: Burkina Faso
- Region: Boucle du Mouhoun Region
- Province: Balé
- Department: Poura Department

Population (2019)
  - Total: 12,327

Poura, also known as Poura-Mine, is the capital of the Poura Department of Balé Province in southern Burkina Faso.

Population
Year	Pop.	±%
1985	4,472	—
2006	362	−91.9%
2019	12,327	+3305.2%
