= Imiougou =

Village in Sabce Department, Burkina Faso

- Location in Burkina Faso
- Coordinates: 13°9′N 1°32′W
- Country: Burkina Faso
- Region: Centre-Nord Region
- Province: Bam Province
- Department: Sabce Department

Population (2019)
  - Total: 2,302
- Time zone: +2

Imiougou is a town in the Sabce Department of Bam Province in northern-central Burkina Faso.

The village was relocated between 2011 and 2013 to allow for the construction of the Bissa gold mine.

Population
Year	Pop.	±%
1985	714	—
2006	1,118	+56.6%
2019	2,302	+105.9%
