= Ouahabou =

- Location in Burkina Faso
- Coordinates: 11°41′N 3°6′W
- Country: Burkina Faso
- Region: Boucle du Mouhoun Region
- Province: Balé
- Department: Boromo Department

Population (2019)
  - Total: 6,324

Ouahabou is a town in the Boromo Department of Balé Province in south-western Burkina Faso.

Population
Year	Pop.	±%
1985	4,257	—
2006	4,730	+11.1%
2019	6,324	+33.7%
