= Koho, Burkina Faso =

Koho
- Location in Burkina Faso
- Coordinates: 11°41′N 3°8′W
- Country: Burkina Faso
- Region: Boucle du Mouhoun Region
- Province: Balé
- Department: Boromo Department

Population (2019)
  - Total: 2,058

Koho is a town in the Boromo Department of Balé Province in south-western Burkina Faso.

Population
Year	Pop.	±%
1985	1,400	—
2006	1,664	+18.9%
2019	2,058	+23.7%
