= Desio (disambiguation) =

Desio is an Italian commune.

Desio may also refer to:

== People ==
- Ardito Desio (1897–2001), Italian explorer, mountain climber, geologist, and cartographer
- Carlos Desio (born 1973), Argentine football manager and former player, brother of Hermes Desio
- Giovanni Battista Desio (1628–1677), Italian Roman Catholic prelate and Bishop of Venosa
- Hermes Desio (born 1970), Argentine former footballer
- Javier Ortega Desio (born 1990), Argentine rugby union player

== Other uses ==
- Battle of Desio, a 1277 battle for control of Milan
- Desio railway station, serving the commune

== See also ==
- De Sio, a surname
