= Davao =

Davao may refer to:

== Places in the Philippines ==
- Davao (province) (1914–1967), a defunct/former province on Mindanao
- Davao Region, an administrative region succeeding Davao province
- Davao City, a city in Davao Region and largest city in Davao del Sur geographically
- Metro Davao, the metropolitan area centered on Davao City
- Port of Davao, Davao City's main seaport
- Davao Gulf, Mindanao
- Davao River, Mindanao
- Archdiocese of Davao, a Roman Catholic archdiocese
- Davao Prison and Penal Farm, Carmen, Davao del Norte

== People ==
- Bing Davao (1959/1960–2025), Filipino actor
- Charlie Davao (1934–2010), Filipino film actor
- Ricky Davao (1961–2025), Filipino actor and director

== Medicine ==
- Davao Regional Medical Center, Tagum, Davao Region, a government training hospital
- Davao Doctors College, a private school in Davao City
- Davao Doctors Hospital, a privately owned hospital in Davao City

== Other uses ==
- Battle of Davao, a 1945 World War II battle
- Davao Cathedral or San Pedro Cathedral, a Roman Catholic church in Davao City
- Davao Eagles, a defunct professional basketball team
- Davao Light and Power Company, an electricity company based in Davao City
- SunStar Davao, an English-language community newspaper based in Davao City
