= Momino, Haskovo Province =

Momino
- Village
- Location in Bulgaria
- Coordinates: 41.852°N 25.730°E
- Country: Bulgaria
- Province: Haskovo Province
- Municipality: Haskovo
- Time zone: UTC+2 (EET)
  - Summer (DST): UTC+3 (EEST)

Momino is a village in the municipality of Haskovo, in Haskovo Province, in southern Bulgaria.

== Honours ==
Momino Point on Brabant Island, Antarctica is named after the village.
