= Oury Department =

Coordinates: 11.9667°N 3.0500°W

Oury
- Department
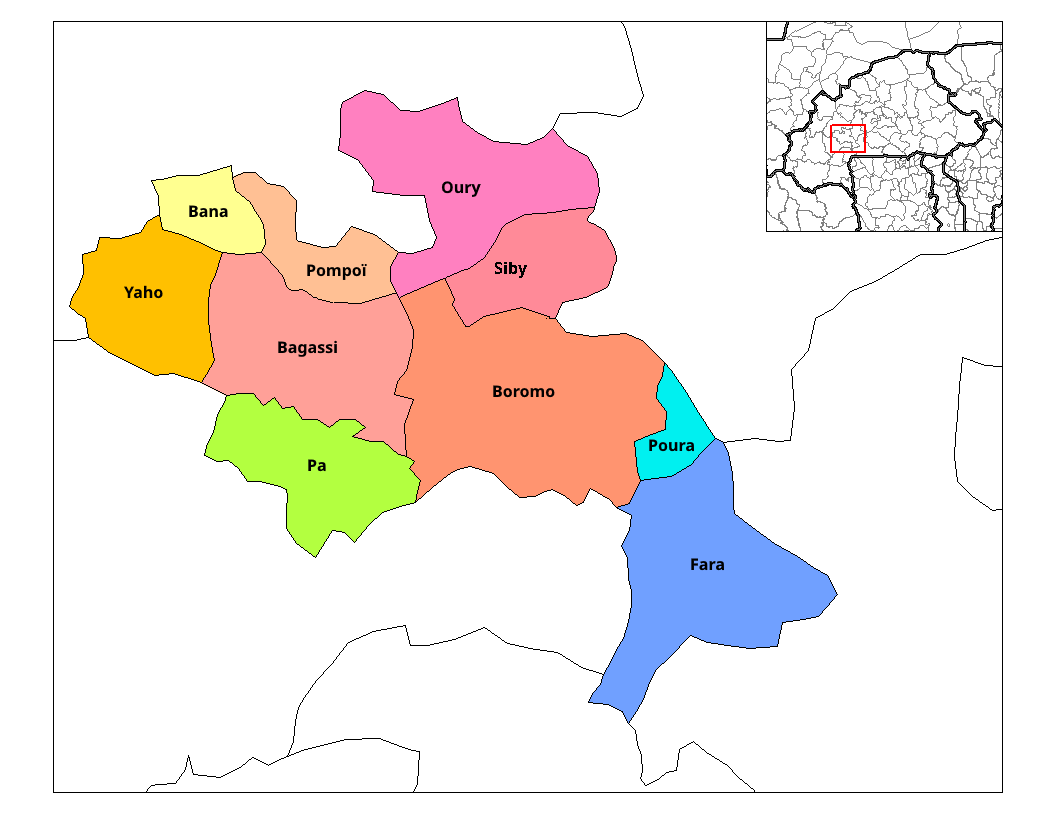
- Oury Department location in the province
- Country: Burkina Faso
- Province: Balé

Population (1996)
  - Total: 24,914
- Time zone: UTC+0 (GMT 0)

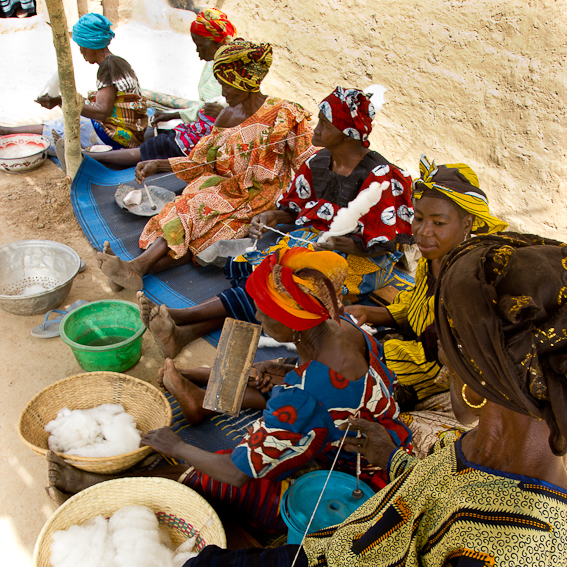
Cotton spinners in Oury department

Oury is a department or commune of Balé Province in southern Burkina Faso. Its capital lies at the town of Oury. According to the 1996 census the department has a total population of 24,914.

== Towns and villages ==
Towns and villages and populations in the department are as follows:

- Oury (3 908 inhabitants) (capital)
- Bandiara (442 inhabitants)
- Da (1 825 inhabitants)
- Dablara (452 inhabitants)
- Habé (637 inhabitants)
- Koena (1 013 inhabitants)
- Koupelo (653 inhabitants)
- Lasso (1 068 inhabitants)
- Momina (437 inhabitants)
- Mou (1 308 inhabitants)
- Oullo (2 118 inhabitants)
- Sani (1 434 inhabitants)
- Sanfo (557 inhabitants)
- Séréna (2 245 inhabitants)
- Seyou (1 147 inhabitants)
- Siou (2 531 inhabitants)
- Soubouy (1 495 inhabitants)
- Taplara (372 inhabitants)
- Zinakongo (1 272 inhabitants)
