= Pâ =

- Location in Burkina Faso
- Coordinates: 11°33′N 3°15.6′W
- Country: Burkina Faso
- Region: Boucle du Mouhoun Region
- Province: Balé
- Department: Pâ Department

Population (2019 census)
  - Total: 15,170

Pâ is the capital of the Pâ Department of Balé Province in south-western Burkina Faso.

Population
Year	Pop.	±%
1985	5,050	—
2006	3,036	−39.9%
2019	15,170	+399.7%
