= Bissa, Bam =

Village in Sabce Department, Burkina Faso

Bissa
- Location in Burkina Faso
- Coordinates: 13°10′51″N 1°30′59″W
- Country: Burkina Faso
- Region: Centre-Nord Region
- Province: Bam Province
- Department: Sabce Department

Population (2019)
  - Total: 1,623
- Time zone: +2

Bissa is a village in the Sabce Department of Bam Province in northern-central Burkina Faso.

The village was relocated between 2011 and 2013 to allow for the construction of the Bissa gold mine.

Population
Year	Pop.	±%
1985	571	—
2006	871	+52.5%
2019	1,623	+86.3%
