= Bagassi Department =

Coordinates: 11.738°N 3.295°W

Bagassi
- Department
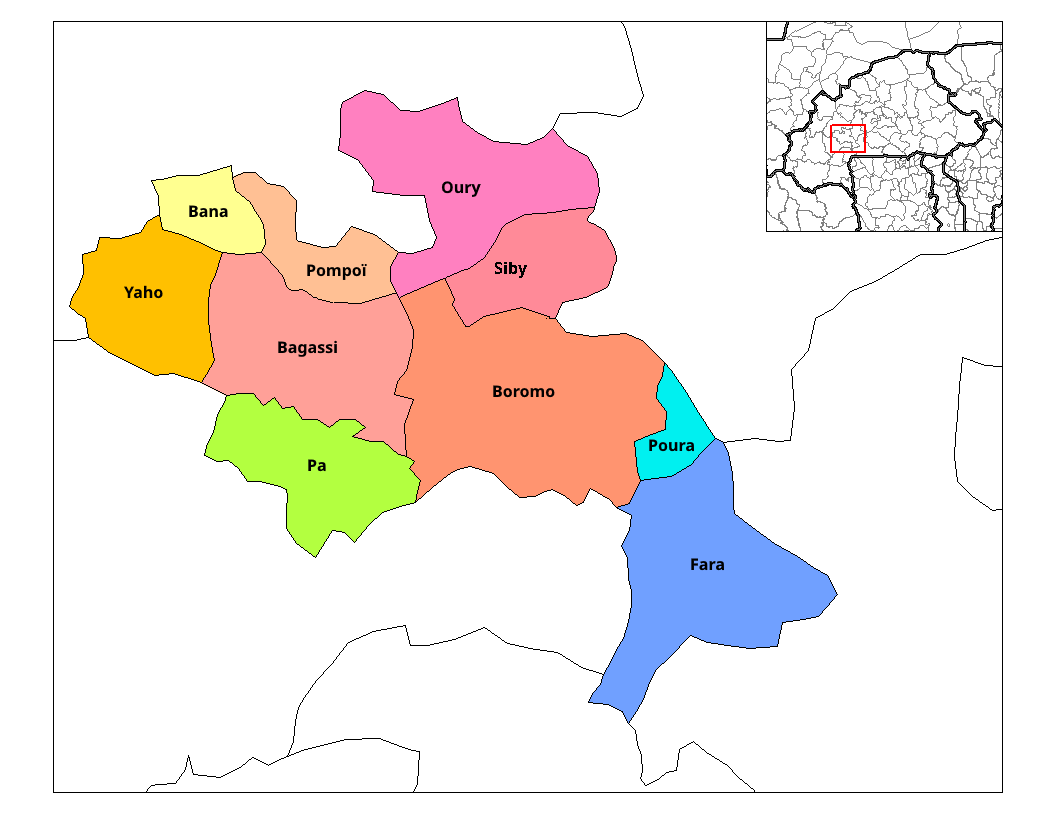
- Bagassi Department location in the province
- Country: Burkina Faso
- Province: Balé

Area
  - Total: 246 sq mi (638 km^{2})

Population (2019)
  - Total: 42,402
  - Density: 172/sq mi (66.5/km^{2})
- Time zone: UTC+0 (GMT 0)

Bagassi is a department or commune of Balé Province in southern Burkina Faso. Its capital is the town of Bagassi. According to the 2019 census the department had a population of 42,402.

== Towns and villages ==
Towns and villages and populations in the department are as follows:

Location	Population
Bagassi (capital)	2,977
Assio	1,106
Badié	687
Bandio	1,176
Banou	820
Bassouan	481
Bounou	2,464
Doussi	913
Haho	342
Kahin	1,277
Kaho	875
Kana	763
Kayio	1,075
Koussaro	817
Mana	1,921
Manzoulé	279
Moko	700
Niaga	532
Niakongo	967
Ouanga	493
Pahin	1,414
Sayaro	1,108
Sipohin	769
Sokoura	399
Virwe	567
Vy	2,821
Yaro	1,573
