= De Sio =

De Sio is a surname of Italian origin. It may refer to:

- Giuliana De Sio (born 1956), Italian actress
- Teresa De Sio (born 1955), Italian folk singer-songwriter
- Vincenzo De Sio (born 1972), Italian former football player

== See also ==
- Desio (disambiguation)
