= Oury, Burkina Faso =

Oury
- Location in Burkina Faso
- Coordinates: 11°58′N 3°3′W
- Country: Burkina Faso
- Region: Boucle du Mouhoun Region
- Province: Balé
- Department: Fara Department

Population (2019)
  - Total: 6,443

Oury is the capital of the Oury Department of Balé Province in southern Burkina Faso.

Population
Year	Pop.	±%
1985	2,663	—
2006	4,513	+69.5%
2019	6,443	+42.8%
