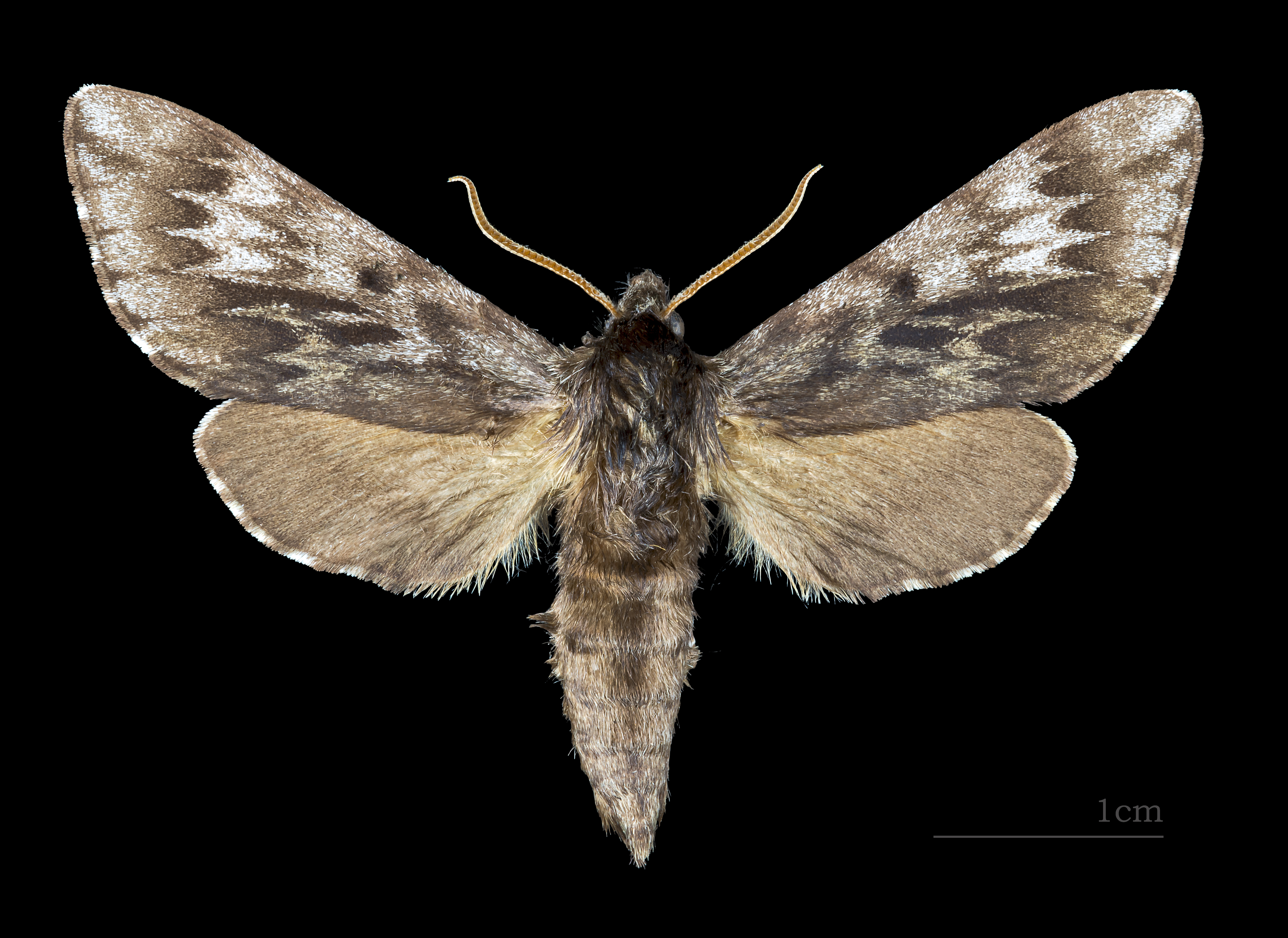
- Lapara bombycoides

Scientific classification
- Domain: Eukaryota
- Kingdom: Animalia
- Phylum: Arthropoda
- Class: Insecta
- Order: Lepidoptera
- Family: Sphingidae
- Tribe: Sphingini
- Genus: Lapara; Walker, 1856

Synonyms
- Ellema Clemens, 1859; Exedrium Grote, 1882

= Lapara (moth) =

Genus of moths

Lapara is a genus of moths in the family Sphingidae. The genus was erected by Francis Walker in 1856.

== Species ==
- Lapara bombycoides Walker, 1856
- Lapara coniferarum (J. E. Smith, 1797)
- Lapara halicarnie Strecker, 1880
- Lapara phaeobrachycerous Brou, 1994
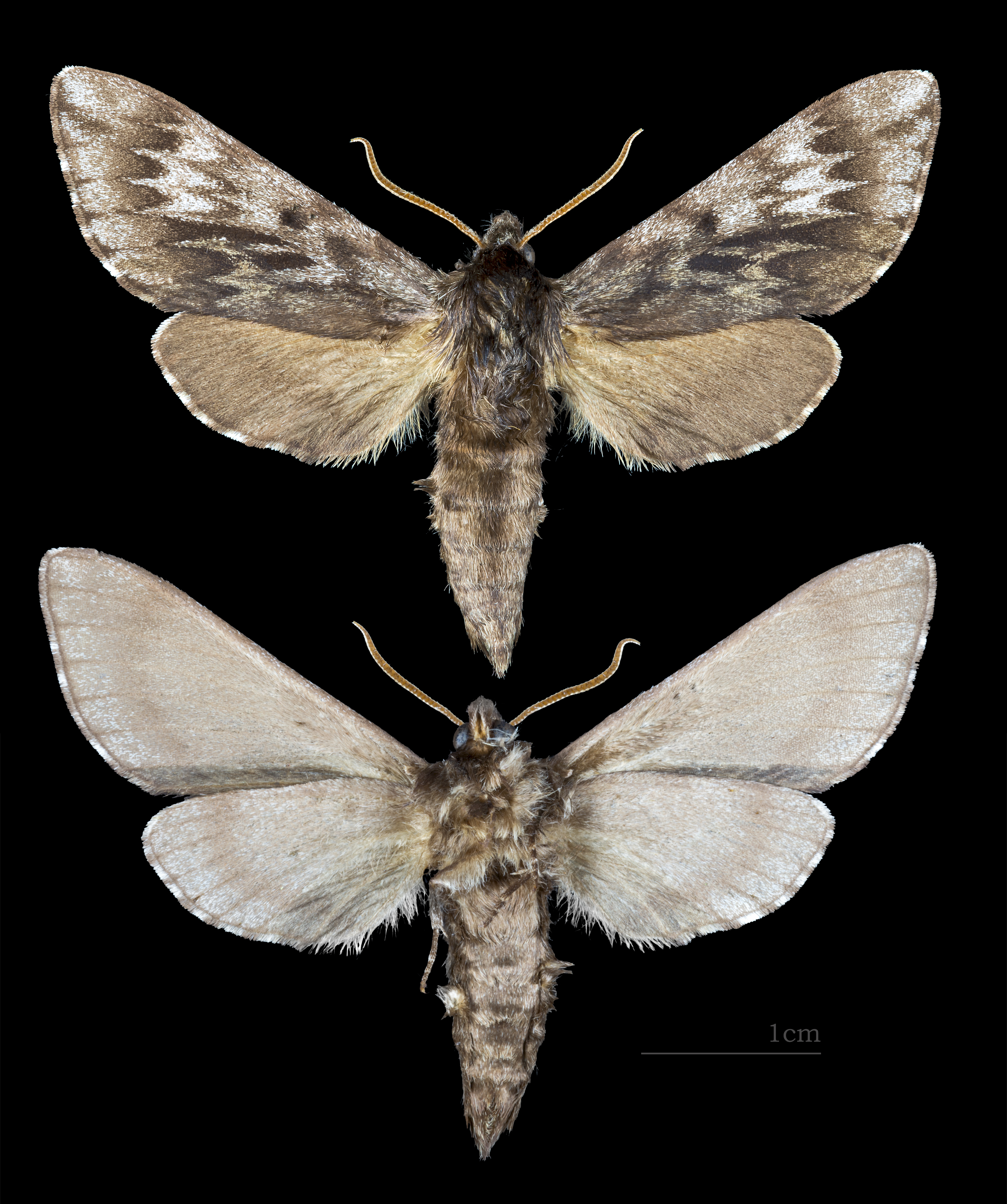
Lapara bombycoides

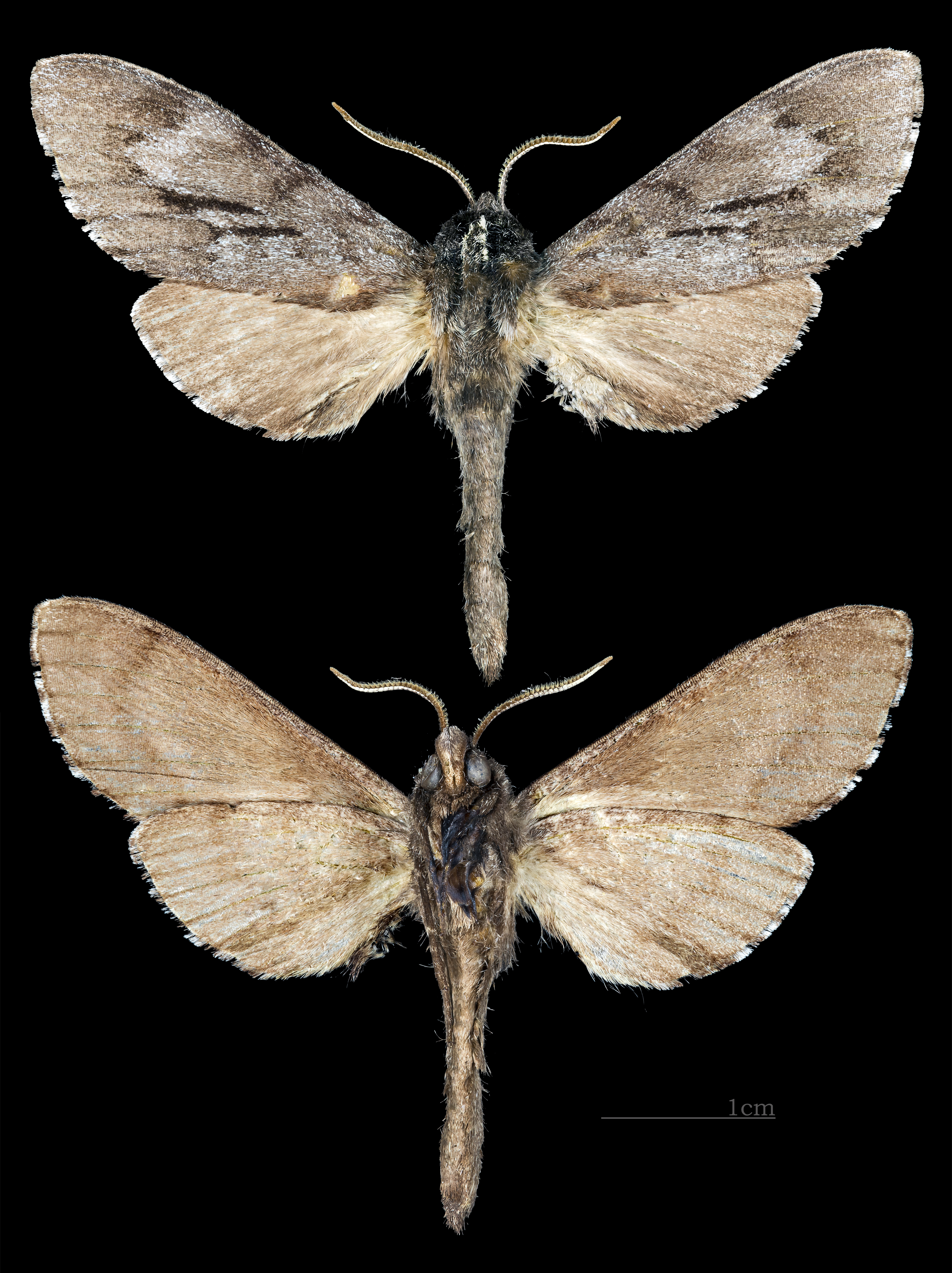
Lapara coniferarum
