= Deux Balés National Park =

National park in Mouhoun Province, Burkina Faso

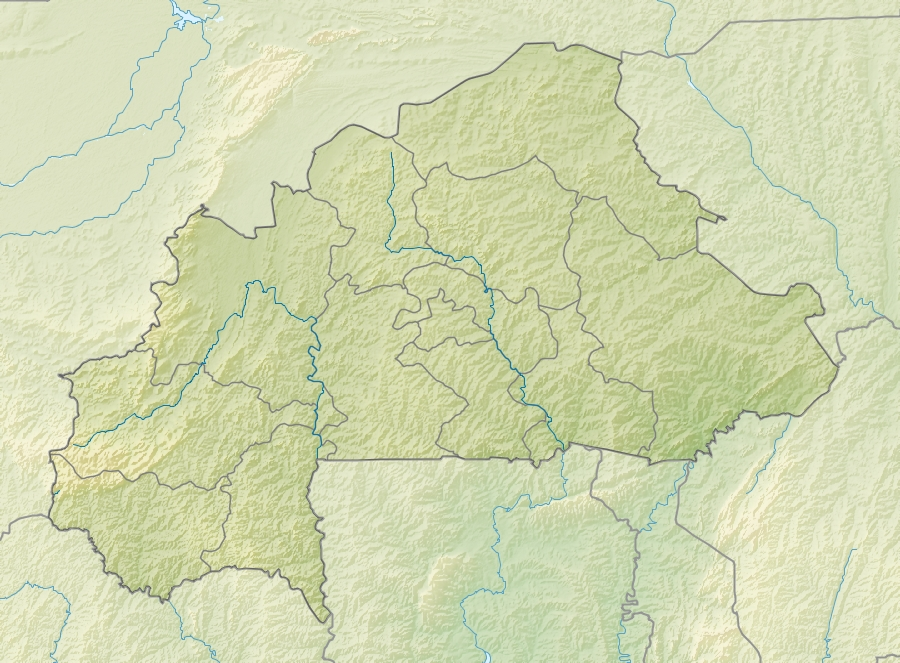
- Location within Burkina Faso
- Location: Burkina Faso
- Coordinates: 11.665°N 2.971°W
- Area: 810 km^{2} (310 sq mi)
- Established: 1937

Deux Balés National Park is a national park located in central eastern Burkina Faso. It is within Mouhoun Province just west of the Black Volta River and at an elevation of 235-310m.

== History ==
Deux Balés National Park was established in 1937 as the forêts classées des Deux Balés ('the Deux Balés Classified Forests') with an area of 610 square kilometres. At that time, it was part of French West Africa. In 1967, while part of the newly independent Republic of Upper Volta, the area was given the name of a National Park and referred to as 'parc national des Deux Balés'. However, there is still no law establishing it as a national park.

Poaching occurs in the park, and in 1968 there was considerable reduction of large mammal populations by the 'Service de l'Elevage'. In 1989, the International Union for Conservation of Nature recommended that "The legal status of Deux Balés National Park should be reviewed, in light of agricultural and mining activities which conflict with the integrity of its elephant populations". By 2001, Burkina Faso was sheltering the largest number of elephants in West Africa, and Deux Balés (together with Baporo Forest) was home to roughly 400 of them.

== Physical features ==
The National Park is part of an undulating granitic plain, with outcrops of rock and lateritic plateaux. It lies at an altitude of 235 to 310 metres.

== Flora and fauna ==
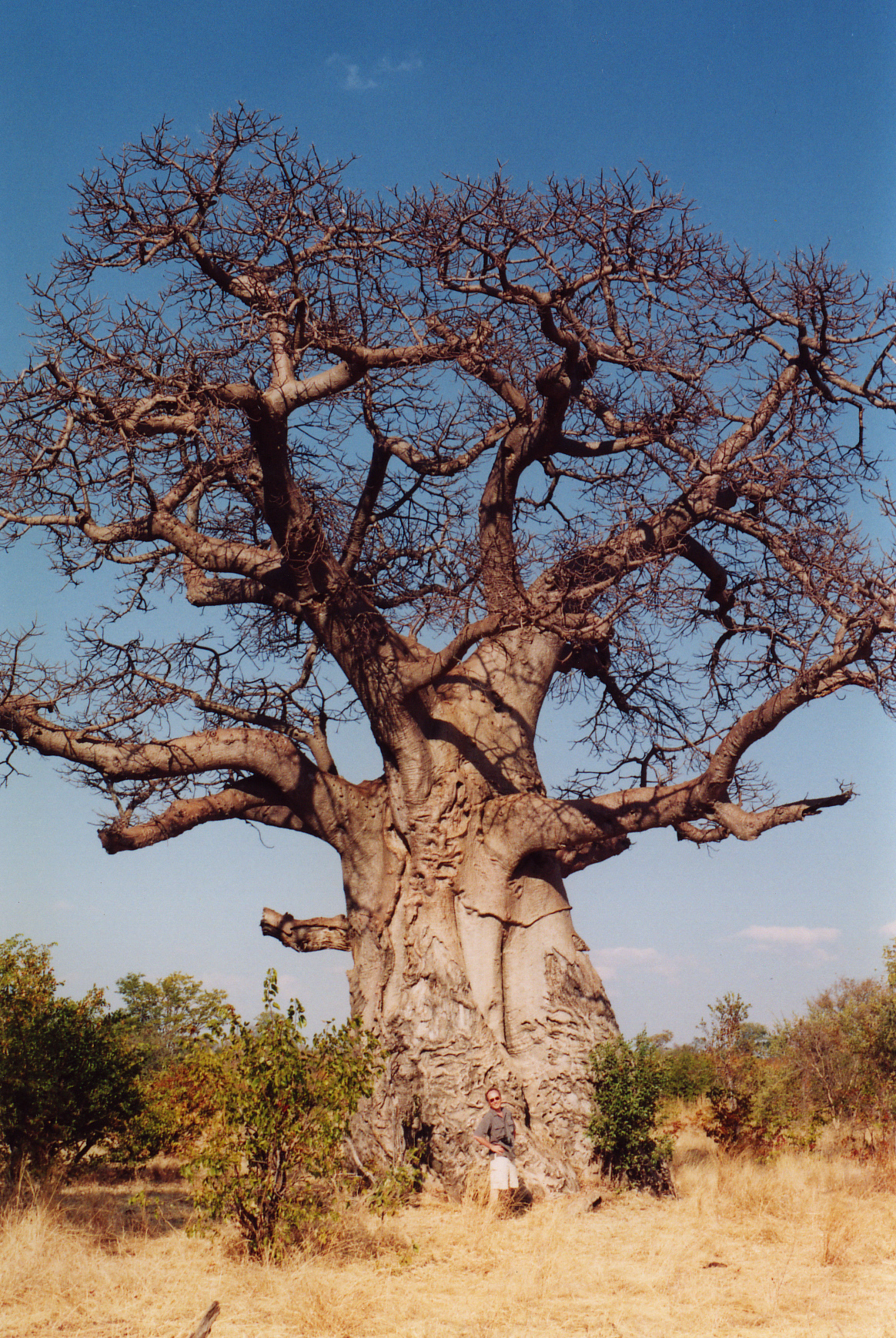
The African baobab tree

The Park has been called "an area of about 200,000 acres (810 km^{2}) of bushland and aging baobab trees". The vegetation comprises Sudano-Zambezian savanna with a carpet of grasses, and trees such as Anogeissus leiocarpus, Isoberlinia doka and Terminalia laxiflora. There is gallery forest on the riverbanks.

Mammals include hippopotamus Hippopotamus amphibius, buffalo Syncerus caffer, elephant Loxodonta africana, antelopes and for the reptiles the crocodile Crocodylus sp., although the diversity of fauna has been reported as being reduced.

In Antelopes: Global Survey And Regional Action Plans (1990), Rod East stated the view that the long-term survival of Burkina Faso's antelope populations would depend on developing rational wildlife utilization schemes in areas such as Deux Balés, recognizing the importance of bushmeat, and that giving legal protection to the antelope there would achieve little without other improvements in management.

Some 100 kilometres of forests along of the banks of the Black Volta River are protected within the Deux Balés.
