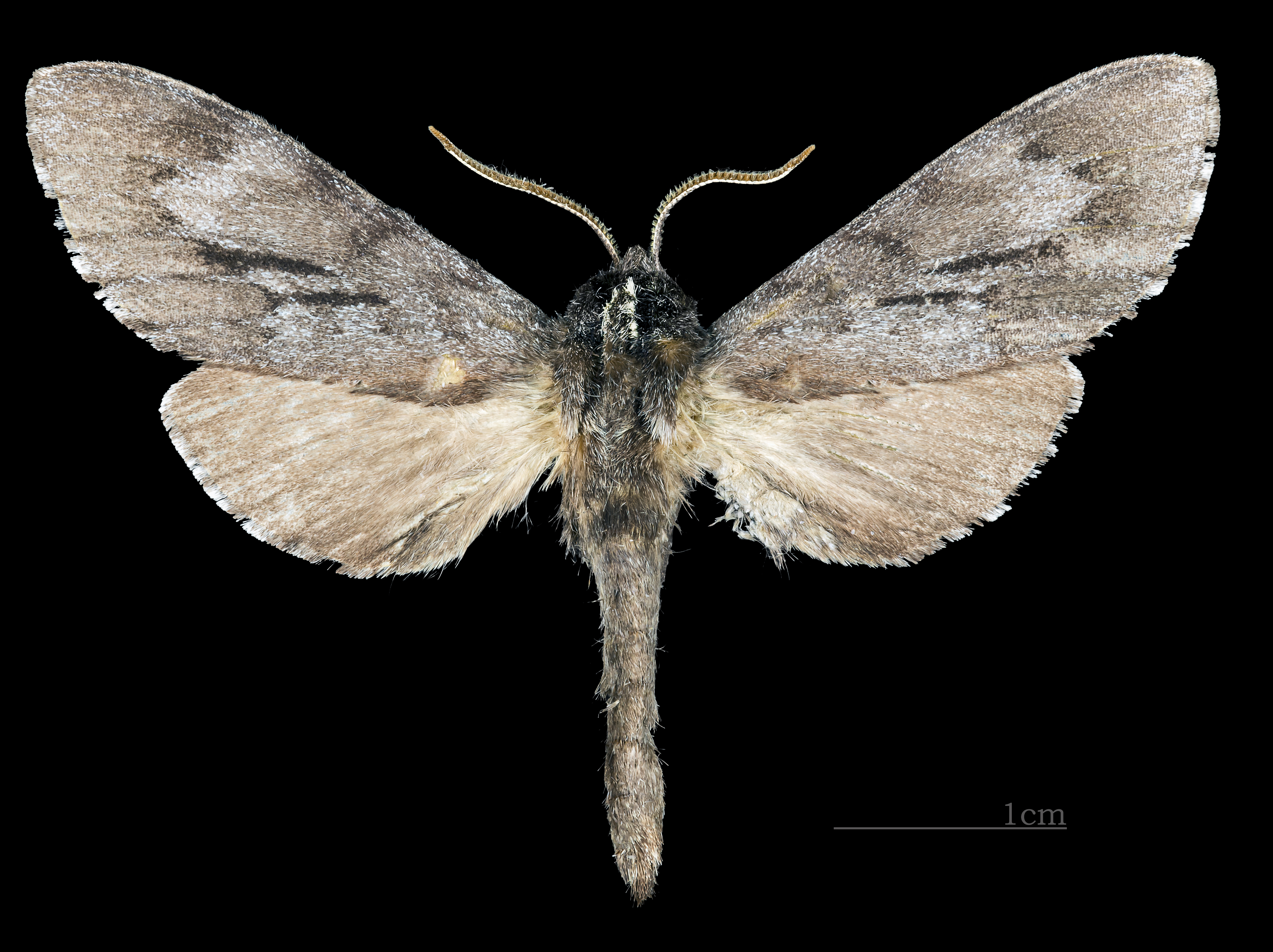
- Male, dorsal view
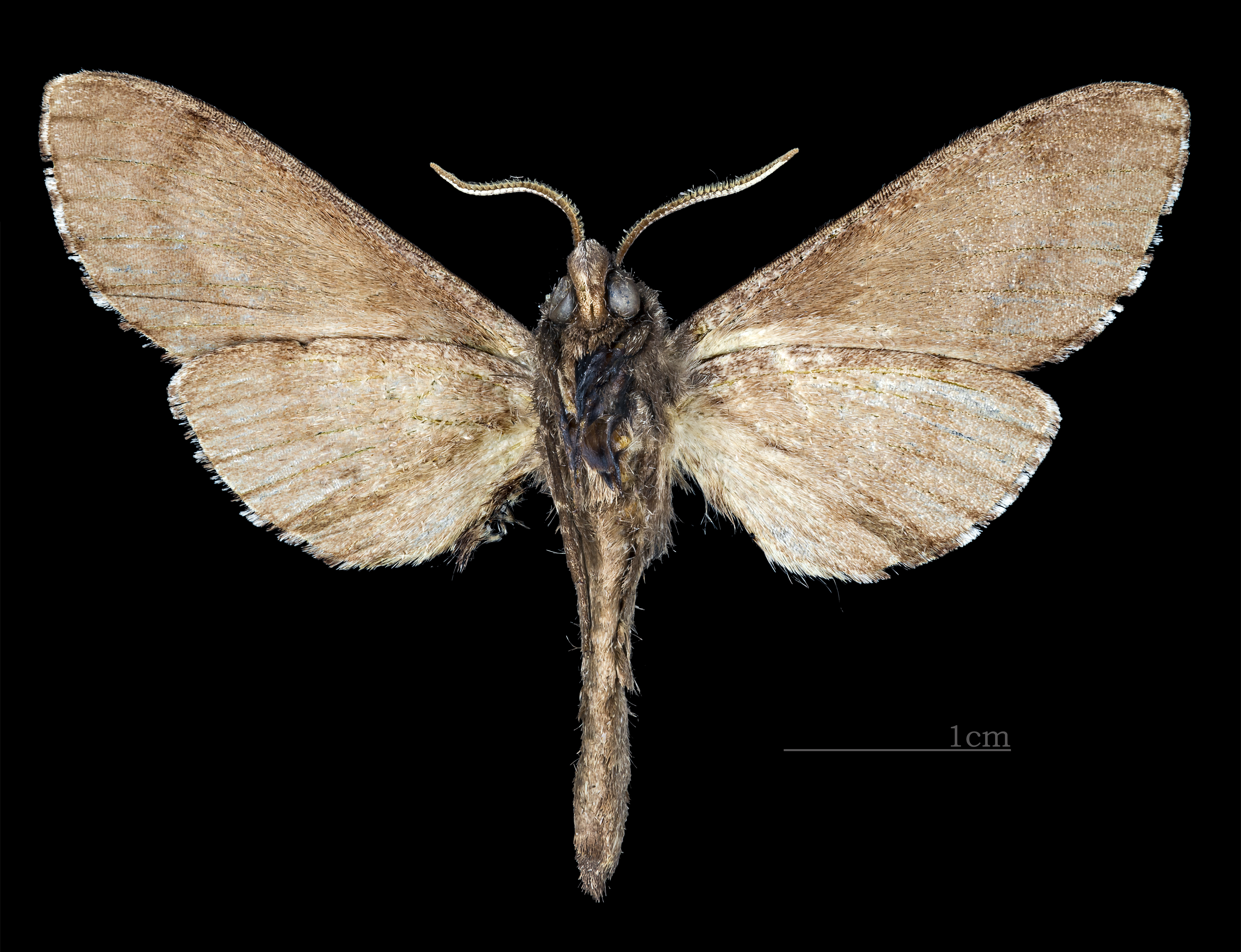
- Male, ventral view

Conservation status
- Secure (NatureServe)

Scientific classification
- Kingdom: Animalia
- Phylum: Arthropoda
- Class: Insecta
- Order: Lepidoptera
- Family: Sphingidae
- Genus: Lapara
- Species: L. coniferarum

Binomial name
- Lapara coniferarum (J. E. Smith, 1797)

Synonyms
- Sphinx coniferarum J.E. Smith, 1797; Sphinx cana Martyn, 1797

= Lapara coniferarum =

Southern pine sphinx

Species of moth

Lapara coniferarum, the southern pine sphinx, is a species of sphinx moth. It was first described by James Edward Smith in 1797. The species is listed as threatened in Connecticut.

== Distribution ==
It is known from mixed and pine forests from Nova Scotia and Maine south to Florida, and west to Indiana and Louisiana.

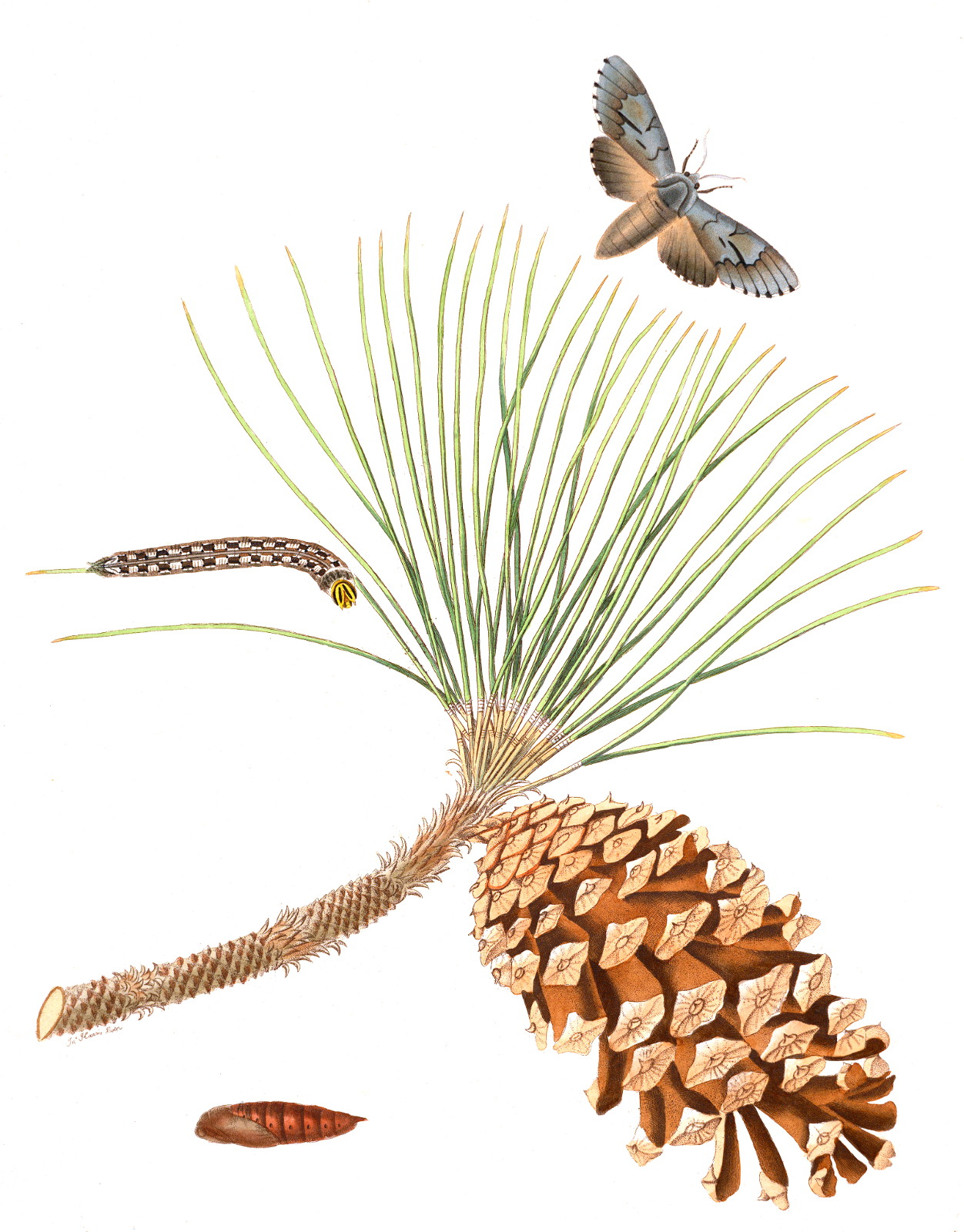
Illustration of life cycle

== Biology ==
The larvae feed on Pinus species, including Pinus taeda and Pinus palustris.
