= Balé Province =

Coordinates: 11°42′N 3°10′W

Balé
- Province
- Location in Burkina Faso

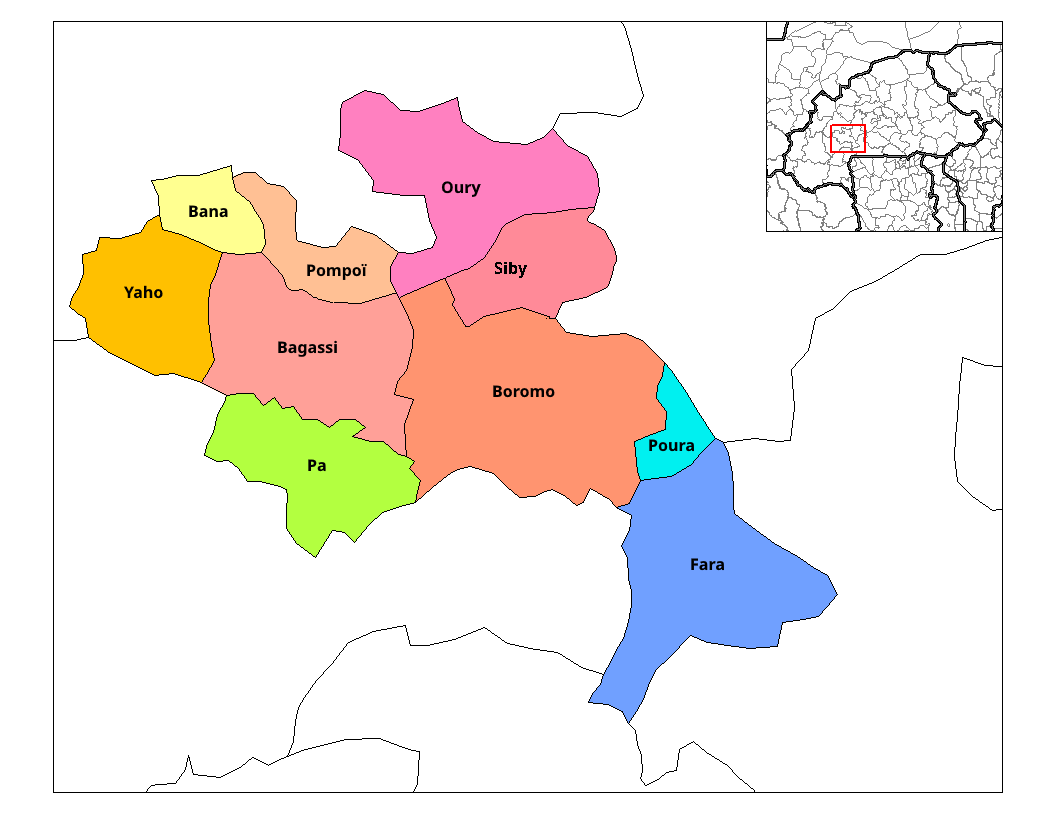
- Provincial map of its departments
- Country: Burkina Faso
- Region: Boucle du Mouhoun
- Capital: Boromo

Area
  - Province: 4,596 km^{2} (1,775 sq mi)

Population (2019 census)
  - Province: 297,367
  - Density: 64.70/km^{2} (167.6/sq mi)
  - Urban: 20,193
- Time zone: UTC+0 (GMT 0)

Balé is one of the 45 provinces of Burkina Faso, located in its Boucle du Mouhoun Region with Boromo as capital. Its area is 4,596 km^{2} (1,775 sq mi), and had a population of 297,367 in 2019. The province is known for its Deux Balé Forest, populated by savannah elephant herds. Boromo, the provincial capital, is located on the main road from Ouagadougou to Bobo-Dioulasso. In June 2007, the Canadian mining company, Semafo, open the third gold mine in the country in Mana in the province, with an investment of about $116 million.

== History ==
On November 15, 2008 a bus accident killed 69 people at Boromo. When a passenger bus transporting workers to Côte d'Ivoire collided with a commercial truck. Both vehicles burst into flames.

== Geography ==
The province is known for its Deux Balé Forest, populated by savannah elephant herds. Boromo, the provincial capital, is located on the main road from Ouagadougou to Bobo-Dioulasso, and serves as a gateway to the park.

== Demographics ==
Most people in the province live in rural areas; 277,165 live in the countryside with only 20,202 people residing in urban areas. There are 147,993 men living in Balé Province and 149,374 women.

== Departments ==
Bale is divided into 10 departments:

The Departments of Bale
Department	Capital city	Population (Census 2006)
Bagassi Department	Bagassi	33,130
Bana Department	Bana	12,999
Boromo Department	Boromo	30,305
Fara Department	Fara	37,194
Oury Department	Oury	26,892
Pâ Department	Pa	19,675
Pompoi Department	Pompoi	11,060
Poura Department	Poura	12,075
Siby Department	Siby	14,143
Yaho Department	Yaho	16,424

== Economy and services ==
In June 2007, the Canadian mining company, Semafo, open the third gold mine in the country in Mana, with an investment of about $116 million. There is a hydroelectric station at Boromo, operated by the Société Nationale d'électricité du Burkina Faso (SONABEL) with 1,269 MWh.

In 2011 the province had 164 primary schools and 22 secondary schools.

In 2011 the province had 31 health and social promotion centers (Centres de santé et de promotion sociale), 4 doctors and 115 nurses.

== See also ==
- Regions of Burkina Faso
- Provinces of Burkina Faso
- Communes of Burkina Faso
