= Sama =

Sama or SAMA may refer to:

== Places ==
- Sama, Burkina Faso, a town in the Kouka Department, Banwa Province, Burkina Faso
- Sama, China (Sanya), a city in Hainan, China
- Sama, Chalus, a village in Mazandaran Province, Iran
- Sama, Nowshahr, a village in Mazandaran Province, Iran
- Sama, South Khorasan, a village in Iran
- Sama (Harstad), a part of Harstad city in northern Norway
- Sama District, one of ten districts of Tacna province, Peru
- Sama, Asturias, a parish in the municipality of Langreo in northern Spain
- Sama River, a river in Peru

== People ==
- Sama-Bajau, an ethnic group of the Philippines and Malaysia whose members commonly refer to themselves as Sama
- Sama (surname), a list of people
- Sama Lukonde (born 1977), Democratic Republic of the Congo politician
- Sam Altman, CEO of OpenAI

== Arts and entertainment ==
- Sama (film), a 1988 Tunisian film directed by Néjia Ben Mabrouk
- Sama (Dragana Mirković album), a 2000 studio album by Serbian singer Dragana Mirković
- Sama (Matthew Shipp and Sabir Mateen album), jazz album by Matthew Shipp and Sabir Mateen
- "Sama" (song), the Polish entry in the 1995 Eurovision Song Contest, performed by Justyna
- Sama, a character of the Mahabharata

== Businesses ==
- Saudi Central Bank, formerly Saudi Arabian Monetary Authority and still using the acronym SAMA, the central bank of Saudi Arabia
- Sama (airline), a defunct Saudi low-cost airline
- Sama (company), an artificial-intelligence company
- Sama Dubai, a property company based in Dubai
- Sama TV, a television station based in Damascus, Syria

== Religion ==
- Sama (Sufism), form of Sufi ritual ceremony
- Sama, the indigenous religion of the Munda people of India
- Sama Veda, Veda of melodies and chants in Hinduism

== SAMA ==
- Liberation Organization of the People of Afghanistan, a Maoist insurgent group operating in Afghanistan
- San Antonio Museum of Art, an art museum in downtown San Antonio, Texas, USA
- Scottish Alternative Music Awards
- Saudi Arabian Monetary Authority, former name of the Saudi Central Bank, the central bank of Saudi Arabia which still uses the acronym SAMA
- Short-acting muscarinic antagonist, a group of medicines used in the treatment of chronic obstructive pulmonary disease
- South African Medical Association
- South African Music Awards, an annual award ceremony
- South African Musicians' Alliance, an artists' collective that resisted the strictures of apartheid
- South Atlantic Magnetic Anomaly, an area where the Earth's inner Van Allen radiation belt comes closest to the Earth's surface
- South Australian Mining Association, a company that in the late 19th century operated one of the world's largest copper mines
- Southern Alleghenies Museum of Art, an art museum with four locations in southwestern Pennsylvania, United States
- Student American Medical Association, a precursor of the American Medical Student Association

== Other uses ==
- MS Sama, various motor ships
- Racing de Sama, a Spanish football club based in the parish of Sama, Langreo, Asturias
- Sama Beirut, an upcoming residential, commercial and office tower in the Sodeco region of Beirut, Lebanon
- Sama Tower, a skyscraper in Dubai, United Arab Emirates
- -sama (様), a Japanese honorific suffix
- Sama language, the language of the Sama people of Southeast Asia
- Sama language (Angola), a Bantu language of Angola

== See also ==
- Samma tribe, a Rajput tribe in Pakistan and India
