= Dehr =

Dehr may refer to:

- Dehu Road railway station, station code DEHR, a railway station of Pune Suburban Railway in India.
- Deus Ex: Human Revolution, a video game
- Public Power Corporation, ticker symbol DEHr, in Greece.

== See also ==
- Dare (disambiguation)
- Deir (disambiguation)
- Der (disambiguation)
- Dere (disambiguation)
- Dher
