= Driko =

- Country: Burkina Faso
- Region: Boucle du Mouhoun
- Province: Banwa Province
- Department: Tansila Department

Population (2019)
  - Total: 1,608
- Time zone: UTC+0 (GMT 0)

Driko is a town in the Tansila Department of Banwa Province in western Burkina Faso.

Population
Year	Pop.	±%
2006	1,156	—
2019	1,608	+39.1%
