= Gama, Burkina Faso =

Gama
- Country: Burkina Faso
- Region: Boucle du Mouhoun
- Province: Banwa Province
- Department: Balavé Department

Population (2019)
  - Total: 1,358
- Time zone: UTC+0 (GMT 0)

Gama is a village in the Balavé Department of Banwa Province in western Burkina Faso.

Population
Year	Pop.	±%
1985	307	—
2006	854	+178.2%
2019	1,358	+59.0%
