= Saint-Michel, Burkina Faso =

Saint-Michel
- Country: Burkina Faso
- Region: Boucle du Mouhoun
- Province: Banwa Province
- Department: Kouka Department

Population (2019)
  - Total: 964
- Time zone: UTC+0 (GMT 0)

Saint-Michel is a village in the Kouka Department of Banwa Province in western Burkina Faso.

Population
Year	Pop.	±%
2006	764	—
2019	964	+26.2%
