= Diontala =

- Location in Burkina Faso
- Coordinates: 11°46′N 4°27′W
- Country: Burkina Faso
- Region: Boucle du Mouhoun
- Province: Banwa Province
- Department: Kouka Department

Population (2019)
  - Total: 4,992
- Time zone: UTC+0 (GMT 0)

Diontala is a town in the Kouka Department of Banwa Province in western Burkina Faso.

Population
Year	Pop.	±%
1985	2,287	—
2006	4,486	+96.2%
2019	4,992	+11.3%
