= Kouelworo =

- Country: Burkina Faso
- Region: Boucle du Mouhoun
- Province: Banwa Province
- Department: Kouka Department

Population (2019)
  - Total: 1,555
- Time zone: UTC+0 (GMT 0)

Kouelworo is a town in the Kouka Department of Banwa Province in western Burkina Faso.

Population
| Year | Pop. | ±% |
|---|---|---|
| 2006 | 1,099 | — |
| 2019 | 1,555 | +41.5% |
