= Dimibo =

- Country: Burkina Faso
- Region: Boucle du Mouhoun
- Province: Banwa Province
- Department: Sami Department

Population (2019)
  - Total: 758
- Time zone: UTC+0 (GMT 0)

Dimibo is a village in the Sami Department of Banwa Province in western Burkina Faso.

Population
Year	Pop.	±%
2006	719	—
2019	758	+5.4%
