= Bonzer =

Bonzer may refer to:

- a slang term in Australian English meaning "good" or "excellent"
- a type of surfboard
- a brand of commercial kitchen equipment such as can openers and portioners
- nickname of John Boreland (born c. 1969), Northern Irish former footballer and loyalist activist

Bonza may refer to:

- an Australian variety of apple
- Bonza, Burkina Faso, a town in West Africa
- Bonza, an Australian low-cost airline
- Bonza (video game), a crossword puzzle video game
