= Dinkiéna =

Dinkiéna Denkiena
- Country: Burkina Faso
- Region: Boucle du Mouhoun
- Province: Banwa Province
- Department: Solenzo Department

Population (2019)
  - Total: 5,428
- Time zone: UTC+0 (GMT 0)

Dinkiéna is a town in the Solenzo Department of Banwa Province in western Burkina Faso.

Population
Year	Pop.	±%
1985	2,110	—
2006	3,633	+72.2%
2019	5,428	+49.4%
