= Korani, Burkina Faso =

Coordinates: 12°30′N 4°22′W

Korani
- Country: Burkina Faso
- Region: Boucle du Mouhoun
- Province: Banwa Province
- Department: Tansila Department

Population (2019)
  - Total: 1,053
- Time zone: UTC+0 (GMT 0)

Korani is a village in the Tansila Department of Banwa Province in western Burkina Faso.

Population
| Year | Pop. | ±% |
|---|---|---|
| 1985 | 423 | — |
| 2006 | 807 | +90.8% |
| 2019 | 1,053 | +30.5% |
