= Kouroumani =

- Country: Burkina Faso
- Region: Boucle du Mouhoun
- Province: Banwa Province
- Department: Kouka Department

Population (2019)
  - Total: 3,930
- Time zone: UTC+0 (GMT 0)

Kouroumani is a town in the Kouka Department of Banwa Province in western Burkina Faso.

Population
Year	Pop.	±%
1985	946	—
2006	2,015	+113.0%
2019	3,930	+95.0%
