= Kéllé =

- Country: Burkina Faso
- Region: Boucle du Mouhoun
- Province: Banwa Province
- Department: Tansila Department

Population (2019)
  - Total: 1,800
- Time zone: UTC+0 (GMT 0)

Kéllé is a town in the Tansila Department of Banwa Province in western Burkina Faso.

Population
Year	Pop.	±%
1985	1,292	—
2006	867	−32.9%
2019	1,800	+107.6%
