= Kira, Burkina Faso =

Kira
- Location in Burkina Faso
- Coordinates: 12°05′N 3°15′W
- Country: Burkina Faso
- Region: Boucle du Mouhoun
- Province: Banwa Province
- Department: Tansila Department

Population (2019)
  - Total: 1,051
- Time zone: UTC+0 (GMT 0)

Kira is a village in the Tansila Department of Banwa Province in western Burkina Faso.

Population
Year	Pop.	±%
2006	677	—
2019	1,051	+55.2%
