= Siwi, Burkina Faso =

Siwi
- Country: Burkina Faso
- Region: Boucle du Mouhoun
- Province: Banwa Province
- Department: Kouka Department

Population (2019)
  - Total: 6,483
- Time zone: UTC+0 (GMT 0)

Siwi is a town in the Kouka Department of Banwa Province in western Burkina Faso.

Population
Year	Pop.	±%
1985	1,243	—
2006	5,157	+314.9%
2019	6,483	+25.7%
