= Douma, Burkina Faso =

Coordinates: 13°37′N 2°46′W

Douma
- Interactive map of Douma
- Country: Burkina Faso
- Region: Boucle du Mouhoun
- Province: Banwa Province
- Department: Tansila Department

Population (2019)
  - Total: 1,804
- Time zone: UTC+0 (GMT 0)

Douma is a town in the Tansila Department of Banwa Province in western Burkina Faso.

Population
Year	Pop.	±%
1985	724	—
2006	1,237	+70.9%
2019	1,804	+45.8%
