= Ouléni =

Ouléni Oulani
- Country: Burkina Faso
- Region: Boucle du Mouhoun
- Province: Banwa Province
- Department: Tansila Department

Population (2019)
  - Total: 302
- Time zone: UTC+0 (GMT 0)

Ouléni is a village in the Tansila Department of Banwa Province in western Burkina Faso.

Population
Year	Pop.	±%
1985	185	—
2006	433	+134.1%
2019	302	−30.3%
