= Nangouna =

Coordinates: 12°31′N 4°21′W

Nangouna Nangouma
- Interactive map of Nangouna
- Country: Burkina Faso
- Region: Boucle du Mouhoun
- Province: Banwa Province
- Department: Tansila Department

Population (2019)
  - Total: 1,915
- Time zone: UTC+0 (GMT 0)

Nangouna is a town in the Tansila Department of Banwa Province in western Burkina Faso.

Population
Year	Pop.	±%
1985	1,289	—
2006	1,521	+18.0%
2019	1,915	+25.9%
