= Faso-benkadi =

- Country: Burkina Faso
- Region: Boucle du Mouhoun
- Province: Banwa Province
- Department: Tansila Department

Population (2019)
  - Total: 914
- Time zone: UTC+0 (GMT 0)

Faso-benkadi is a village in the Tansila Department of Banwa Province in western Burkina Faso.

Population
Year	Pop.	±%
2006	1,289	—
2019	914	−29.1%
