= Liaba =

Coordinates: 11°57′N 4°26′W

- Interactive map of Liaba
- Country: Burkina Faso
- Region: Boucle du Mouhoun
- Province: Banwa Province
- Department: Kouka Department

Population (2019)
  - Total: 624
- Time zone: UTC+0 (GMT 0)

Liaba is a village in the Kouka Department of Banwa Province in western Burkina Faso.

Population
Year	Pop.	±%
1985	134	—
2006	616	+359.7%
2019	624	+1.3%
