= Toma Koura =

- Country: Burkina Faso
- Region: Boucle du Mouhoun
- Province: Banwa Province
- Department: Tansila Department

Population (2019)
  - Total: 985
- Time zone: UTC+0 (GMT 0)

Toma Koura is a village in the Tansila Department of Banwa Province in western Burkina Faso.

Population
Year	Pop.	±%
1985	135	—
2006	190	+40.7%
2019	985	+418.4%
