= Hèrèdougou =

- Country: Burkina Faso
- Region: Boucle du Mouhoun
- Province: Banwa Province
- Department: Solenzo Department

Population (2019)
  - Total: 4,619
- Time zone: UTC+0 (GMT 0)

Hèrèdougou is a town in the Solenzo Department of Banwa Province in western Burkina Faso.

Population
Year	Pop.	±%
2006	3,143	—
2019	4,619	+47.0%
