= Denkoro =

Coordinates: 12°15′N 4°06′W

Denkoro Dinkoro
- Interactive map of Denkoro
- Country: Burkina Faso
- Region: Boucle du Mouhoun
- Province: Banwa Province
- Department: Solenzo Department

Population (2019)
  - Total: 3,350
- Time zone: UTC+0 (GMT 0)

Denkoro is a town in the Solenzo Department of Banwa Province in western Burkina Faso.

Population
Year	Pop.	±%
1985	1,825	—
2006	2,583	+41.5%
2019	3,350	+29.7%
