= Sélenkoro =

- Country: Burkina Faso
- Region: Boucle du Mouhoun
- Province: Banwa Province
- Department: Kouka Department

Population (2019)
  - Total: 1,607
- Time zone: UTC+0 (GMT 0)

Sélenkoro is a town in the Kouka Department of Banwa Province in western Burkina Faso.

Population
Year	Pop.	±%
1985	417	—
2006	1,222	+193.0%
2019	1,607	+31.5%
