= Mawé, Burkina Faso =

Mawé
- Location in Burkina Faso
- Coordinates: 12°05′N 4°23′W
- Country: Burkina Faso
- Region: Boucle du Mouhoun
- Province: Banwa Province
- Department: Solenzo Department

Population (2019)
  - Total: 2,485
- Time zone: UTC+0 (GMT 0)

Mawé is a town in the Solenzo Department of Banwa Province in western Burkina Faso.

Population
Year	Pop.	±%
2006	2,374	—
2019	2,485	+4.7%
