= Tamouga =

- Country: Burkina Faso
- Region: Boucle du Mouhoun
- Province: Banwa Province
- Department: Tansila Department

Population (2019)
  - Total: 792
- Time zone: UTC+0 (GMT 0)

Tamouga is a village in the Tansila Department of Banwa Province in western Burkina Faso.

Population
Year	Pop.	±%
1985	422	—
2006	605	+43.4%
2019	792	+30.9%
