= Nemena =

Coordinates: 12°28′N 3°46′W

- Interactive map of Nemena
- Country: Burkina Faso
- Region: Boucle du Mouhoun
- Province: Banwa Province
- Department: Sanaba Department

Population (2019)
  - Total: 1,331
- Time zone: UTC+0 (GMT 0)

Nemena is a town in the Sanaba Department of Banwa Province in western Burkina Faso.

Population
Year	Pop.	±%
1985	769	—
2006	898	+16.8%
2019	1,331	+48.2%
