= Dèssè =

Coordinates: 13°30′N 0°37′E

- Interactive map of Dèssè
- Country: Burkina Faso
- Region: Boucle du Mouhoun
- Province: Banwa Province
- Department: Solenzo Department

Population (2019)
  - Total: 2,128
- Time zone: UTC+0 (GMT 0)

Dèssè is a town in the Solenzo Department of Banwa Province in western Burkina Faso.

Population
| Year | Pop. | ±% |
|---|---|---|
| 1985 | 1,343 | — |
| 2006 | 1,938 | +44.3% |
| 2019 | 2,128 | +9.8% |
