= Daboura =

Coordinates: 12°13′35″N 3°55′46″W

- Interactive map of Daboura
- Country: Burkina Faso
- Region: Boucle du Mouhoun
- Province: Banwa Province
- Department: Solenzo Department

Population (2019)
  - Total: 8,856
- Time zone: UTC+0 (GMT 0)

Daboura is a town in the Solenzo Department of Banwa Province in western Burkina Faso.

Population
| Year | Pop. | ±% |
|---|---|---|
| 1985 | 4,648 | — |
| 2006 | 7,697 | +65.6% |
| 2019 | 8,856 | +15.1% |
