= Gnoumakuy =

Gnoumakuy Gnianmakuy
- Country: Burkina Faso
- Region: Boucle du Mouhoun
- Province: Banwa Province
- Department: Sanaba Department

Population (2019)
  - Total: 541
- Time zone: UTC+0 (GMT 0)

Gnoumakuy is a village in the Sanaba Department of Banwa Province in western Burkina Faso.

Population
Year	Pop.	±%
1985	189	—
2006	540	+185.7%
2019	541	+0.2%
