= Tangouna =

- Location in Burkina Faso
- Coordinates: 12°29′N 4°12′W
- Country: Burkina Faso
- Region: Boucle du Mouhoun
- Province: Banwa Province
- Department: Balavé Department

Population (2019)
  - Total: 1,577
- Time zone: UTC+0 (GMT 0)

Tangouna is a village in the Balavé Department of Banwa Province in western Burkina Faso.

Population
Year	Pop.	±%
1985	794	—
2006	1,089	+37.2%
2019	1,577	+44.8%
