= Bendougou =

Coordinates: 12°28′N 3°36′W

- Interactive map of Bendougou
- Country: Burkina Faso
- Region: Boucle du Mouhoun
- Province: Banwa Province
- Department: Sanaba Department

Population (2019)
  - Total: 3,961
- Time zone: UTC+0 (GMT 0)

Bendougou is a town in the Sanaba Department of Banwa Province in western Burkina Faso.

Population
Year	Pop.	±%
1985	2,775	—
2006	3,417	+23.1%
2019	3,961	+15.9%
