= Toma, Banwa =

Coordinates: 12°38′42″N 4°24′22″W

Toma
- Interactive map of Toma
- Country: Burkina Faso
- Region: Boucle du Mouhoun
- Province: Banwa Province
- Department: Tansila Department

Population (2019)
  - Total: 1,980
- Time zone: UTC+0 (GMT 0)

Toma is a town in the Tansila Department of Banwa Province in western Burkina Faso.

Population
Year	Pop.	±%
1985	639	—
2006	1,497	+134.3%
2019	1,980	+32.3%
