= Mahouana =

- Country: Burkina Faso
- Region: Boucle du Mouhoun
- Province: Banwa Province
- Department: Kouka Department

Population (2019)
  - Total: 6,108
- Time zone: UTC+0 (GMT 0)

Mahouana is a town in the Kouka Department of Banwa Province in western Burkina Faso.

Population
Year	Pop.	±%
1985	3,819	—
2006	6,470	+69.4%
2019	6,108	−5.6%
