= Bonkorowé =

Bonkorowé Bongrowe
- Country: Burkina Faso
- Region: Boucle du Mouhoun
- Province: Banwa Province
- Department: Sami Department

Population (2019)
  - Total: 790
- Time zone: UTC+0 (GMT 0)

Bonkorowé is a village in the Sami Department of Banwa Province in western Burkina Faso.

Population
| Year | Pop. | ±% |
|---|---|---|
| 1985 | 137 | — |
| 2006 | 505 | +268.6% |
| 2019 | 790 | +56.4% |
