= Montionkuy =

- Country: Burkina Faso
- Region: Boucle du Mouhoun
- Province: Banwa Province
- Department: Solenzo Department

Population (2019)
  - Total: 1,126
- Time zone: UTC+0 (GMT 0)

Montionkuy is a village in the Solenzo Department of Banwa Province in western Burkina Faso.

Population
Year	Pop.	±%
1985	645	—
2006	885	+37.2%
2019	1,126	+27.2%
