= Bankouma =

- Location in Burkina Faso
- Coordinates: 11°53′N 4°16′W
- Country: Burkina Faso
- Region: Boucle du Mouhoun
- Province: Banwa Province
- Department: Kouka Department

Population (2019)
  - Total: 3,308
- Time zone: UTC+0 (GMT 0)

Bankouma is a town in the Kouka Department of Banwa Province in western Burkina Faso.

Population
Year	Pop.	±%
1985	1,926	—
2006	3,422	+77.7%
2019	3,308	−3.3%
