= Houna =

- Country: Burkina Faso
- Region: Boucle du Mouhoun
- Province: Banwa Province
- Department: Kouka Department

Population (2019)
  - Total: 5,568
- Time zone: UTC+0 (GMT 0)

Houna is a town in the Kouka Department of Banwa Province in western Burkina Faso.

Population
Year	Pop.	±%
1985	3,368	—
2006	4,193	+24.5%
2019	5,568	+32.8%
