= Kossoba =

Coordinates: 12°27′N 3°58′W

- Interactive map of Kossoba
- Country: Burkina Faso
- Region: Boucle du Mouhoun
- Province: Banwa Province
- Department: Sanaba Department

Population (2019)
  - Total: 1,997
- Time zone: UTC+0 (GMT 0)

Kossoba is a town in the Sanaba Department of Banwa Province in western Burkina Faso.

Population
Year	Pop.	±%
2006	2,038	—
2019	1,997	−2.0%
