= Koakoa =

- Country: Burkina Faso
- Region: Boucle du Mouhoun
- Province: Banwa Province
- Department: Solenzo Department

Population (2019)
  - Total: 1,164
- Time zone: UTC+0 (GMT 0)

Koakoa is a small town in the Solenzo Department of Banwa Province in western Burkina Faso.

Population
Year	Pop.	±%
1985	299	—
2006	795	+165.9%
2019	1,164	+46.4%
