= Timba, Burkina Faso =

Timba
- Country: Burkina Faso
- Region: Boucle du Mouhoun
- Province: Banwa Province
- Department: Sanaba Department

Population (2019)
  - Total: 130
- Time zone: UTC+0 (GMT 0)

Timba is a village in the Sanaba Department of Banwa Province in western Burkina Faso.

Population
| Year | Pop. | ±% |
|---|---|---|
| 2006 | 261 | — |
| 2019 | 130 | −50.2% |
