= Gnassoumadougou =

- Country: Burkina Faso
- Region: Boucle du Mouhoun
- Province: Banwa Province
- Department: Solenzo Department

Population (2019)
  - Total: 3,799
- Time zone: UTC+0 (GMT 0)

Gnassoumadougou is a town in the Solenzo Department of Banwa Province in western Burkina Faso.

Population
Year	Pop.	±%
1985	2,199	—
2006	3,516	+59.9%
2019	3,799	+8.0%
