= Féléwé =

- Interactive map of Féléwé
- Coordinates: 12°39′50″N 4°14′45″W
- Country: Burkina Faso
- Region: Boucle du Mouhoun
- Province: Banwa Province
- Department: Tansila Department

Population (2019)
  - Total: 758
- Time zone: UTC+0 (GMT 0)

Féléwé is a village in the Tansila Department of Banwa Province in western Burkina Faso.

Population
Year	Pop.	±%
1985	1,196	—
2006	928	−22.4%
2019	758	−18.3%
