= Dira, Burkina Faso =

Coordinates: 12°21′N 3°59′W

Dira
- Interactive map of Dira
- Country: Burkina Faso
- Region: Boucle du Mouhoun
- Province: Banwa Province
- Department: Solenzo Department

Population (2019)
  - Total: 3,825
- Time zone: UTC+0 (GMT 0)

Dira is a town in the Solenzo Department of Banwa Province in western Burkina Faso.

Population
Year	Pop.	±%
1985	2,014	—
2006	3,294	+63.6%
2019	3,825	+16.1%
