= Dio, Burkina Faso =

Coordinates: 12°20′03″N 3°51′47″W

Dio
- Interactive map of Dio
- Country: Burkina Faso
- Region: Boucle du Mouhoun
- Province: Banwa Province
- Department: Sanaba Department

Population (2019)
  - Total: 3,078
- Time zone: UTC+0 (GMT 0)

Dio is a town in the Sanaba Department of Banwa Province in western Burkina Faso.

Population
Year	Pop.	±%
1985	1,353	—
2006	2,296	+69.7%
2019	3,078	+34.1%
