= Koma, Burkina Faso =

Coordinates: 11°38′N 0°26′W

Koma
- Interactive map of Koma
- Country: Burkina Faso
- Region: Boucle du Mouhoun
- Province: Banwa Province
- Department: Solenzo Department

Population (2019)
  - Total: 2,803
- Time zone: UTC+0 (GMT 0)

Koma is a town in the Solenzo Department of Banwa Province in western Burkina Faso.

Population
Year	Pop.	±%
1985	973	—
2006	2,002	+105.8%
2019	2,803	+40.0%
