= Fini =

Fini may refer to:

== People ==
=== Surname ===
- Antonio Fini (born 1983), Italian dancer, choreographer, and director
- Cosimo Fini (born 1980), known as Guè, Italian rapper
- Fino Fini (1928–2020), Italian doctor
- Gianfranco Fini (born 1952), Italian politician
- Leonor Fini (1907–1996), Argentine artist
- Lili Fini Zanuck (born 1954), American film producer and director
- Michele Fini (born 1974), Italian footballer
- Seydou Fini (born 2006), Ivorian-born Italian footballer

=== Given name ===
- Fini Henriques (1867–1940), Danish composer and violinist
- Fini Sturm (born 1995), German rower

== Other uses ==
- Fini (company), a Spanish confectionery company
- Fini, Burkina Faso, a town
- 795 Fini, a minor planet
- Tapu Fini, a generation VII Pokémon
