= Kiè =

Coordinates: 12.1044°N 4.0539°W

- Interactive map of Kiè
- Country: Burkina Faso
- Region: Boucle du Mouhoun
- Province: Banwa Province
- Department: Solenzo Department

Population (2019)
  - Total: 9,459
- Time zone: UTC+0 (GMT 0)

Kiè is a town in the Solenzo Department of Banwa Province in western Burkina Faso.

Population
Year	Pop.	±%
1985	11,808	—
2006	5,073	−57.0%
2019	9,459	+86.5%
