= Gui, Burkina Faso =

Gui
- Country: Burkina Faso
- Region: Boucle du Mouhoun
- Province: Banwa Province
- Department: Tansila Department

Population (2019)
  - Total: 887
- Time zone: UTC+0 (GMT 0)

Gui is a village in the Tansila Department of Banwa Province in western Burkina Faso.

Population
Year	Pop.	±%
1985	380	—
2006	664	+74.7%
2019	887	+33.6%
