= Bourawali =

Bourawali Bourawale
- Country: Burkina Faso
- Region: Boucle du Mouhoun
- Province: Banwa Province
- Department: Kouka Department

Population (2019)
  - Total: 717
- Time zone: UTC+0 (GMT 0)

Bourawali is a village in the Kouka Department of Banwa Province in western Burkina Faso.

Population
| Year | Pop. | ±% |
|---|---|---|
| 1985 | 191 | — |
| 2006 | 472 | +147.1% |
| 2019 | 717 | +51.9% |
