= Badinga =

- Location in Burkina Faso
- Coordinates: 12°22′N 4°12′W
- Country: Burkina Faso
- Region: Boucle du Mouhoun
- Province: Banwa Province
- Department: Balavé Department

Population (2019)
  - Total: 3,054
- Time zone: UTC+0 (GMT 0)

Badinga is a town in the Balavé Department of Banwa Province in western Burkina Faso.

Population
Year	Pop.	±%
1985	1,196	—
2006	2,150	+79.8%
2019	3,054	+42.0%
