= Yenkuy =

Coordinates: 12.4667°N 3.8500°W

- Interactive map of Yenkuy
- Country: Burkina Faso
- Region: Boucle du Mouhoun
- Province: Banwa Province
- Department: Sanaba Department

Population (2019)
  - Total: 542
- Time zone: UTC+0 (GMT 0)

Yenkuy is a village in the Sanaba Department of Banwa Province in western Burkina Faso.

Population
Year	Pop.	±%
1985	191	—
2006	334	+74.9%
2019	542	+62.3%
