= Tillé, Burkina Faso =

Tillé
- Country: Burkina Faso
- Region: Boucle du Mouhoun
- Province: Banwa Province
- Department: Tansila Department

Population (2019)
  - Total: 1,130
- Time zone: UTC+0 (GMT 0)

Tillé is a village in the Tansila Department of Banwa Province in western Burkina Faso.

Population
| Year | Pop. | ±% |
|---|---|---|
| 1985 | 477 | — |
| 2006 | 747 | +56.6% |
| 2019 | 1,130 | +51.3% |
