= Toula, Burkina Faso =

Toula
- Country: Burkina Faso
- Region: Boucle du Mouhoun
- Province: Banwa Province
- Department: Tansila Department

Population (2019)
  - Total: 1,788
- Time zone: UTC+0 (GMT 0)

Toula is a town in the Tansila Department of Banwa Province in western Burkina Faso.

Population
Year	Pop.	±%
1985	841	—
2006	2,783	+230.9%
2019	1,788	−35.8%
