= Doga, Burkina Faso =

Coordinates: 13°12′N 0°43′W

Doga Dogo
- Interactive map of Doga
- Country: Burkina Faso
- Region: Boucle du Mouhoun
- Province: Banwa Province
- Department: Balavé Department

Population (2019)
  - Total: 1,122
- Time zone: UTC+0 (GMT 0)

Doga is a village in the Balavé Department of Banwa Province in western Burkina Faso.

Population
Year	Pop.	±%
1985	454	—
2006	898	+97.8%
2019	1,122	+24.9%
