= Bèna =

Coordinates: 12.0804°N 4.1890°W

- Interactive map of Bèna
- Country: Burkina Faso
- Region: Boucle du Mouhoun
- Province: Banwa Province
- Department: Solenzo Department

Population (2019)
  - Total: 14,462
- Time zone: UTC+0 (GMT 0)

Bèna is a town in the Solenzo Department of Banwa Province in western Burkina Faso.

Population
Year	Pop.	±%
1985	12,042	—
2006	11,595	−3.7%
2019	14,462	+24.7%
