= Ouorowé =

Ouorowé Ourwe
- Country: Burkina Faso
- Region: Boucle du Mouhoun
- Province: Banwa Province
- Department: Tansila Department

Population (2019)
  - Total: 3,179
- Time zone: UTC+0 (GMT 0)

Ouorowé is a town in the Tansila Department of Banwa Province in western Burkina Faso.

Population
Year	Pop.	±%
1985	1,574	—
2006	2,922	+85.6%
2019	3,179	+8.8%
