= Bouan, Burkina Faso =

Bouan
- Country: Burkina Faso
- Region: Boucle du Mouhoun
- Province: Banwa Province
- Department: Tansila Department

Population (2019)
  - Total: 1,017
- Time zone: UTC+0 (GMT 0)

Bouan is a village in the Tansila Department of Banwa Province in western Burkina Faso.

Population
| Year | Pop. | ±% |
|---|---|---|
| 1985 | 460 | — |
| 2006 | 691 | +50.2% |
| 2019 | 1,017 | +47.2% |
