= Koulakou =

- Country: Burkina Faso
- Region: Boucle du Mouhoun
- Province: Banwa Province
- Department: Kouka Department

Population (2019)
  - Total: 1,622
- Time zone: UTC+0 (GMT 0)

Koulakou is a town in the Kouka Department of Banwa Province in western Burkina Faso.

Population
Year	Pop.	±%
2006	1,473	—
2019	1,622	+10.1%
