= Sogodjankoli =

Sogodjankoli Sogodiankoli
- Country: Burkina Faso
- Region: Boucle du Mouhoun
- Province: Banwa Province
- Department: Sami Department

Population (2019)
  - Total: 1,281
- Time zone: UTC+0 (GMT 0)

Sogodjankoli is a town in the Sami Department of Banwa Province in western Burkina Faso.

Population
Year	Pop.	±%
1985	442	—
2006	1,901	+330.1%
2019	1,281	−32.6%
