= Bialé =

- Country: Burkina Faso
- Region: Boucle du Mouhoun
- Province: Banwa Province
- Department: Solenzo Department

Population (2019)
  - Total: 2,425
- Time zone: UTC+0 (GMT 0)

Bialé is a town in the Solenzo Department of Banwa Province in western Burkina Faso.

Population
Year	Pop.	±%
1985	1,120	—
2006	2,131	+90.3%
2019	2,425	+13.8%
