= Lèkoro =

Coordinates: 12°12′N 4°13′W

- Interactive map of Lèkoro
- Country: Burkina Faso
- Region: Boucle du Mouhoun
- Province: Banwa Province
- Department: Solenzo Department

Population (2019)
  - Total: 3,155
- Time zone: UTC+0 (GMT 0)

Lèkoro is a town in the Solenzo Department of Banwa Province in western Burkina Faso.

Population
Year	Pop.	±%
1985	1,002	—
2006	1,904	+90.0%
2019	3,155	+65.7%
