= Gombio =

Coordinates: 12.4667°N 3.7333°W

- Interactive map of Gombio
- Country: Burkina Faso
- Region: Boucle du Mouhoun
- Province: Banwa Province
- Department: Sanaba Department

Population (2019)
  - Total: 361
- Time zone: UTC+0 (GMT 0)

Gombio is a village in the Sanaba Department of Banwa Province in western Burkina Faso.

Population
Year	Pop.	±%
1985	203	—
2006	348	+71.4%
2019	361	+3.7%
