= Ouarakuy =

- Location in Burkina Faso
- Coordinates: 12°31′N 3°46′W
- Country: Burkina Faso
- Region: Boucle du Mouhoun
- Province: Banwa Province
- Department: Sanaba Department

Population (2019)
  - Total: 1,155
- Time zone: UTC+0 (GMT 0)

Ouarakuy is a village in the Sanaba Department of Banwa Province in western Burkina Faso.

Population
Year	Pop.	±%
1985	358	—
2006	504	+40.8%
2019	1,155	+129.2%
