= Kokouna =

- Country: Burkina Faso
- Region: Boucle du Mouhoun
- Province: Banwa Province
- Department: Tansila Department

Population (2019)
  - Total: 1,896
- Time zone: UTC+0 (GMT 0)

Kokouna is a town in the Tansila Department of Banwa Province in western Burkina Faso.

Population
Year	Pop.	±%
1985	1,108	—
2006	1,403	+26.6%
2019	1,896	+35.1%
