= Koba, Burkina Faso =

Koba
- Location in Burkina Faso
- Coordinates: 12°31′N 3°55′W
- Country: Burkina Faso
- Region: Boucle du Mouhoun
- Province: Banwa Province
- Department: Sanaba Department

Population (2019)
  - Total: 1,856
- Time zone: UTC+0 (GMT 0)

Koba is a town in the Sanaba Department of Banwa Province in western Burkina Faso.

Population
Year	Pop.	±%
1985	792	—
2006	1,333	+68.3%
2019	1,856	+39.2%
