= Sorwa =

- Country: Burkina Faso
- Region: Boucle du Mouhoun
- Province: Banwa Province
- Department: Sanaba Department

Population (2019)
  - Total: 648
- Time zone: UTC+0 (GMT 0)

Sorwa or Sora is a village in the Sanaba Department of Banwa Province in western Burkina Faso.

Population
Year	Pop.	±%
2006	705	—
2019	648	−8.1%
