= Kouneni =

- Interactive map of Kouneni
- Coordinates: 12°36′40″N 4°20′10″W
- Country: Burkina Faso
- Region: Boucle du Mouhoun
- Province: Banwa Province
- Department: Tansila Department

Population (2019)
  - Total: 1,609
- Time zone: UTC+0 (GMT 0)

Kouneni is a town in the Tansila Department of Banwa Province in western Burkina Faso.

Population
Year	Pop.	±%
1985	515	—
2006	1,067	+107.2%
2019	1,609	+50.8%
