= Bérenkuy =

Coordinates: 12.4667°N 3.8333°W

- Interactive map of Bérenkuy
- Country: Burkina Faso
- Region: Boucle du Mouhoun
- Province: Banwa Province
- Department: Sanaba Department

Population (2019)
  - Total: 745
- Time zone: UTC+0 (GMT 0)

Bérenkuy is a village in the Sanaba Department of Banwa Province in western Burkina Faso.

Population
Year	Pop.	±%
1985	185	—
2006	579	+213.0%
2019	745	+28.7%
