= Masso, Burkina Faso =

Coordinates: 12°19′N 4°01′W

Masso
- Interactive map of Masso
- Country: Burkina Faso
- Region: Boucle du Mouhoun
- Province: Banwa Province
- Department: Solenzo Department

Population (2019)
  - Total: 3,923
- Time zone: UTC+0 (GMT 0)

Masso is a town in the Solenzo Department of Banwa Province in western Burkina Faso.

Population
Year	Pop.	±%
1985	1,353	—
2006	2,124	+57.0%
2019	3,923	+84.7%
