= Moara, Burkina Faso =

Moara
- Country: Burkina Faso
- Region: Boucle du Mouhoun
- Province: Banwa Province
- Department: Tansila Department

Population (2019)
  - Total: 1,450
- Time zone: UTC+0 (GMT 0)

Moara is a village in the Tansila Department of Banwa Province in western Burkina Faso.

Population
Year	Pop.	±%
1985	447	—
2006	484	+8.3%
2019	1,450	+199.6%
