= Ben, Burkina Faso =

Ben
- Location in Burkina Faso
- Coordinates: 12°42′N 4°21′W
- Country: Burkina Faso
- Region: Boucle du Mouhoun
- Province: Banwa Province
- Department: Tansila Department

Population (2019)
  - Total: 1,248
- Time zone: UTC+0 (GMT 0)

Ben is a village in the Tansila Department of Banwa Province in western Burkina Faso. As of 2005 it had a population of 901. It lies near the border with Mali.

Population
Year	Pop.	±%
1985	456	—
2006	931	+104.2%
2019	1,248	+34.0%
