= Ziga, Burkina Faso =

Coordinates: 12.6175°N 0.823056°W

Ziga
- Interactive map of Ziga
- Country: Burkina Faso
- Region: Boucle du Mouhoun
- Province: Banwa Province
- Department: Sanaba Department

Population (2019)
  - Total: 5,568
- Time zone: UTC+0 (GMT 0)

Ziga is a town in the Sanaba Department of Banwa Province in western Burkina Faso.

Population
Year	Pop.	±%
1985	4,610	—
2006	6,963	+51.0%
2019	5,568	−20.0%
