= Kosso, Burkina Faso =

Kosso
- Country: Burkina Faso
- Region: Boucle du Mouhoun
- Province: Banwa Province
- Department: Sanaba Department

Population (2019)
  - Total: 1,987
- Time zone: UTC+0 (GMT 0)

Kosso is a village in the Sanaba Department of Banwa Province in western Burkina Faso.

Population
Year	Pop.	±%
1985	809	—
2006	1,586	+96.0%
2019	1,987	+25.3%
