= Soumakuy =

Coordinates: 12.5167°N 3.6500°W

- Interactive map of Soumakuy
- Country: Burkina Faso
- Region: Boucle du Mouhoun
- Province: Banwa Province
- Department: Sanaba Department

Population (2019)
  - Total: 746
- Time zone: UTC+0 (GMT 0)

Soumakuy is a village in the Sanaba Department of Banwa Province in western Burkina Faso.

Population
Year	Pop.	±%
1985	197	—
2006	493	+150.3%
2019	746	+51.3%
