= Yèrèssoro =

- Country: Burkina Faso
- Region: Boucle du Mouhoun
- Province: Banwa Province
- Department: Solenzo Department

Population (2019)
  - Total: 3,206
- Time zone: UTC+0 (GMT 0)

Yèrèssoro is a town in the Solenzo Department of Banwa Province in western Burkina Faso.

Population
Year	Pop.	±%
2006	2,975	—
2019	3,206	+7.8%
