= Lago, Burkina Faso =

Lago
- Country: Burkina Faso
- Region: Boucle du Mouhoun
- Province: Banwa Province
- Department: Balavé Department

Population (2019)
  - Total: 1,522
- Time zone: UTC+0 (GMT 0)

Lago is a village in the Balavé Department of Banwa Province in western Burkina Faso.

Population
Year	Pop.	±%
2006	691	—
2019	1,522	+120.3%
