= Ban, Burkina Faso =

Ban
- Country: Burkina Faso
- Region: Boucle du Mouhoun
- Province: Banwa Province
- Department: Solenzo Department

Population (2019)
  - Total: 11,743
- Time zone: UTC+0 (GMT 0)

Ban is a town in the Solenzo Department of Banwa Province in western Burkina Faso.

Population
Year	Pop.	±%
1985	6,560	—
2006	8,809	+34.3%
2019	11,743	+33.3%
