= Priwé =

- Interactive map of Priwé
- Coordinates: 12°12′12″N 4°29′05″W
- Country: Burkina Faso
- Region: Boucle du Mouhoun
- Province: Banwa Province
- Department: Sami Department

Population (2019)
  - Total: 3,089
- Time zone: UTC+0 (GMT 0)

Priwé is a town in the Sami Department of Banwa Province in western Burkina Faso.

Population
Year	Pop.	±%
1985	1,689	—
2006	2,590	+53.3%
2019	3,089	+19.3%
