= Dima, Burkina Faso =

Coordinates: 12°29′23″N 4°21′22″W

Dima
- Interactive map of Dima
- Country: Burkina Faso
- Region: Boucle du Mouhoun
- Province: Banwa Province
- Department: Sami Department

Population (2019)
  - Total: 2,384
- Time zone: UTC+0 (GMT 0)

Dima is a village in the Sami Department of Banwa Province in western Burkina Faso.

Population
Year	Pop.	±%
1985	373	—
2006	530	+42.1%
2019	2,384	+349.8%
