= Siguinonghin =

- Country: Burkina Faso
- Region: Boucle du Mouhoun
- Province: Banwa Province
- Department: Solenzo Department

Population (2019)
  - Total: 5,286
- Time zone: UTC+0 (GMT 0)

Siguinonghin is a town in the Solenzo Department of Banwa Province in western Burkina Faso.

Population
Year	Pop.	±%
2006	4,184	—
2019	5,286	+26.3%
