= Pekuy =

Coordinates: 12°30′N 3°49′W

- Interactive map of Pekuy
- Country: Burkina Faso
- Region: Boucle du Mouhoun
- Province: Banwa Province
- Department: Sanaba Department

Population (2019)
  - Total: 667
- Time zone: UTC+0 (GMT 0)

Pekuy is a village in the Sanaba Department of Banwa Province in western Burkina Faso.

Population
Year	Pop.	±%
1985	227	—
2006	344	+51.5%
2019	667	+93.9%
