= Dissankuy =

Coordinates: 12°12′N 4°02′W

- Interactive map of Dissankuy
- Country: Burkina Faso
- Region: Boucle du Mouhoun
- Province: Banwa Province
- Department: Solenzo Department

Population (2019)
  - Total: 4,289
- Time zone: UTC+0 (GMT 0)

Dissankuy is a town in the Solenzo Department of Banwa Province in western Burkina Faso.

Population
Year	Pop.	±%
1985	1,822	—
2006	3,280	+80.0%
2019	4,289	+30.8%
