= Kounla =

Coordinates: 12.4833°N 3.8000°W

- Interactive map of Kounla
- Country: Burkina Faso
- Region: Boucle du Mouhoun
- Province: Banwa Province
- Department: Sanaba Department

Population (2019)
  - Total: 724
- Time zone: UTC+0 (GMT 0)

Kounla is a village in the Sanaba Department of Banwa Province in western Burkina Faso.

Population
Year	Pop.	±%
1985	255	—
2006	449	+76.1%
2019	724	+61.2%
