= Founa =

- Location in Burkina Faso
- Coordinates: 12°26′N 3°42′W
- Country: Burkina Faso
- Region: Boucle du Mouhoun
- Province: Banwa Province
- Department: Sanaba Department

Population (2019)
  - Total: 1,745
- Time zone: UTC+0 (GMT 0)

Founa is a town in the Sanaba Department of Banwa Province in western Burkina Faso.

Population
Year	Pop.	±%
1985	725	—
2006	1,619	+123.3%
2019	1,745	+7.8%
