= Moussakongo =

Coordinates: 12°17′N 4°08′W

- Interactive map of Moussakongo
- Country: Burkina Faso
- Region: Boucle du Mouhoun
- Province: Banwa Province
- Department: Solenzo Department

Population (2019)
  - Total: 5,297
- Time zone: UTC+0 (GMT 0)

Moussakongo is a town in the Solenzo Department of Banwa Province in western Burkina Faso.

Population
Year	Pop.	±%
1985	1,933	—
2006	3,673	+90.0%
2019	5,297	+44.2%
