= Darsalam, Solenzo =

Darsalam, Banwa
- Country: Burkina Faso
- Region: Boucle du Mouhoun
- Province: Banwa Province
- Department: Solenzo Department

Population (2019)
  - Total: 5,265
- Time zone: UTC+0 (GMT 0)

Darsalam, Banwa is a town in the Solenzo Department of Banwa Province in western Burkina Faso.

Population
Year	Pop.	±%
2006	4,070	—
2019	5,265	+29.4%
