= Sagoéta =

Sagoéta Sagoita
- Interactive map of Sagoéta
- Coordinates: 12°08′02″N 4°27′58″W
- Country: Burkina Faso
- Region: Boucle du Mouhoun
- Province: Banwa Province
- Department: Sami Department

Population (2019)
  - Total: 1,365
- Time zone: UTC+0 (GMT 0)

Sagoéta is a village in the Sami Department of Banwa Province in western Burkina Faso.

Population
Year	Pop.	±%
1985	420	—
2006	933	+122.1%
2019	1,365	+46.3%
