= Mollé =

- Country: Burkina Faso
- Region: Boucle du Mouhoun
- Province: Banwa Province
- Department: Kouka Department

Population (2019)
  - Total: 4,908
- Time zone: UTC+0 (GMT 0)

Mollé is a town in the Kouka Department of Banwa Province in western Burkina Faso.

Population
Year	Pop.	±%
1985	2,258	—
2006	4,000	+77.1%
2019	4,908	+22.7%
