= Moussakuy =

Coordinates: 12°29′45″N 3°42′15″W

- Interactive map of Moussakuy
- Country: Burkina Faso
- Region: Boucle du Mouhoun
- Province: Banwa Province
- Department: Sanaba Department

Population (2019)
  - Total: 1,557
- Time zone: UTC+0 (GMT 0)

Moussakuy is a town in the Sanaba Department of Banwa Province in western Burkina Faso.

Population
Year	Pop.	±%
1985	709	—
2006	1,190	+67.8%
2019	1,557	+30.8%
