= Hasbialaye =

- Country: Burkina Faso
- Region: Boucle du Mouhoun
- Province: Banwa Province
- Department: Balavé Department

Population (2019)
  - Total: 1,448
- Time zone: UTC+0 (GMT 0)

Hasbialaye is a village in the Balavé Department of Banwa Province in western Burkina Faso.

Population
Year	Pop.	±%
2006	877	—
2019	1,448	+65.1%
