= Darsalam, Tansila =

Darsalam
- Country: Burkina Faso
- Region: Boucle du Mouhoun
- Province: Banwa Province
- Department: Tansila Department

Population (2019)
  - Total: 926
- Time zone: UTC+0 (GMT 0)

Darsalam is a town in the Tansila Department of Banwa Province in western Burkina Faso.

Population
Year	Pop.	±%
2006	608	—
2019	926	+52.3%
