= Sallé =

Coordinates: 12°35′N 1°40′W

- Interactive map of Sallé
- Country: Burkina Faso
- Region: Boucle du Mouhoun
- Province: Banwa Province
- Department: Kouka Department

Population (2019)
  - Total: 3,669
- Time zone: UTC+0 (GMT 0)

Sallé is a town in the Kouka Department of Banwa Province in western Burkina Faso.

Population
Year	Pop.	±%
1985	1,601	—
2006	2,929	+82.9%
2019	3,669	+25.3%
