= Yasso, Burkina Faso =

Yasso
- Location in Burkina Faso
- Coordinates: 12°22′N 4°2′W
- Country: Burkina Faso
- Region: Boucle du Mouhoun
- Province: Banwa Province
- Department: Balavé Department

Population (2019)
  - Total: 6,140
- Time zone: UTC+0 (GMT 0)

Yasso is a town in the Balavé Department of Banwa Province in western Burkina Faso.

Population
Year	Pop.	±%
1985	3,454	—
2006	4,533	+31.2%
2019	6,140	+35.5%
