= Tansila =

Coordinates: 12°26′N 4°23′W

- Interactive map of Tansila
- Country: Burkina Faso
- Region: Boucle du Mouhoun
- Province: Banwa Province
- Department: Tansila Department

Population (2019)
  - Total: 5,507
- Time zone: UTC+0 (GMT 0)

Tansila is a town and seat of the Tansila Department of Banwa Province in western Burkina Faso.

Population
Year	Pop.	±%
1985	2,541	—
2006	3,434	+35.1%
2019	5,507	+60.4%
