= Bayé =

Bayé may refer to:

== People ==
- Betty Bayé (born 1946), American journalist

== Places ==
- Bayé, Burkina Faso
- Bayé, Kayes, Mali
