= Toungo =

Toungo may refer to:

- Toungo, Burkina Faso, a town in the Tansila Department of Banwa Province
- Toungo, Nigeria, a Local Government Area of Adamawa State
