= Metopocoilus rojasi =

Scientific classification
- Domain: Eukaryota
- Kingdom: Animalia
- Phylum: Arthropoda
- Class: Insecta
- Order: Coleoptera
- Suborder: Polyphaga
- Infraorder: Cucujiformia
- Family: Cerambycidae
- Genus: Metopocoilus
- Species: M. rojasi

Binomial name
- Metopocoilus rojasi Sallé, 1853

Species of beetle

Metopocoilus rojasi is a species of beetle in the family Cerambycidae. It was described by Sallé in 1853.
