= March 2025 Diapaga attack =

2025 battle in Burkina Faso

2025 Diapaga attack
- Part of Islamist insurgency in Burkina Faso
Date	March 28, 2025
Location	Diapaga, Est Region, Burkina Faso
Result	JNIM victory

Belligerents
Burkina Faso Armed Forces: VDP; 27th BIR	Jama'at Nusrat al-Islam wal Muslimin

Commanders and leaders
Yannick Sawadogo †	Unknown

Casualties and losses
63+ killed (per Liberation); 100+ casualties (per Nasr)	Unknown

On March 28, 2025, jihadists from Jama'at Nusrat al-Islam wal-Muslimin attacked Burkinabe forces at Diapaga, Est Region, Burkina Faso, killing at least sixty soldiers. The attack was revenge for the massacre of over 130 civilians at Solenzo on March 11.

== Background ==
Between March 10 and 11, 2025, soldiers from the Volunteers for the Defense of the Homeland and the Burkinabe Army massacred over 58 Fulani civilians near the town of Solenzo in northwest Burkina Faso. The victims were accused of sheltering jihadists who had attacked VDP fighters earlier that month. Human Rights Watch deplored the massacre, and called for an investigation. HRW also warned of imminent reprisal attacks by jihadist groups.

== Attack ==
The attack began at around 4pm on March 28, when Jama'at Nusrat al-Islam wal-Muslimin (JNIM) fighters launched an attack on the Burkinabe army and VDP base in Diapaga. The jihadists arrived on motorcycles from the south, and attacked the base south of the town which was housing soldiers from the 27th Rapid Intervention Brigade (BIR) and VDP volunteers at the time. During the attack, the jihadists used civilian drones to monitor the movements of the Burkinabe soldiers. After brief resistance, the Burkinabe forces fled. The jihadists looted the camp and then set fire to it.

The attackers then set fire to several buildings in the city of Diapaga, freeing prisoners and looting a cotton company according to RFI. Sahel expert Wassim Nasr contradicted these claims, saying that the jihadists didn't free the prison or loot the cotton company, but instead limited themselves to a few districts of the city to chase after fleeing soldiers.

== Aftermath ==
According to LSI Africa, at least 65 soldiers and VDP were killed during the attack including base commander Yannick Sawadogo. On March 30, RFI reported at least 30 soldiers and 22 VDP were killed, but clarified that the toll could increase. Libération reported that 63 soldiers and VDP were killed. Two weeks after the attack, Nasr stated that at least 100 soldiers and VDP were killed, missing, or injured.

On April 8, JNIM released a statement saying that the Diapaga attack was the "beginning of revenge for Solenzo". Five days earlier, JNIM attacked civilians and VDP conscripts in the Sourou Valley, killing at least 200.

Another attack occurred in Diapaga on May 12th, where JNIM proceeded to raid the city, attacking a prison, destroying monuments, and setting fires to businesses. During the prison attack, prisoners were freed, with some being recruited into the ranks of JNIM. On May 21st, a video was taken showing armed militants speaking to residents stating that city was completely under their control. A Burkinabe military convoy entered the city on June 9th, according to a broadcast from Radio Télévision du Burkina, having left from Fada N'gourma two weeks prior.
