= Dare (comics) =

Dare, in comics, may refer to:

- Dare Comics, a British publisher of comics
- Dan Dare, a British comics character who has appeared in the Eagle and 2000 AD
- Dan Dare (Fawcett Comics), a Fawcett Comics character

== See also ==
- Dare (disambiguation)
