= Yasso =

Yasso may refer to:

- Yasso, Burkina Faso
- Yasso, Mali
- Yasso (frozen yogurt), brand of frozen yogurt bars
