= Pouy =

Pouy may refer to:

- Pouy, Hautes-Pyrénées, France
- Pouy, Burkina Faso
- Chan (commune), Cambodia (also called Pouy)
- former name of Saint-Vincent-de-Paul, Landes, France
