= Sami, Burkina Faso =

Sami
- Country: Burkina Faso
- Region: Boucle du Mouhoun
- Province: Banwa Province
- Department: Sami Department

Population (2019)
  - Total: 721
- Time zone: UTC+0 (GMT 0)

Sami is a village in the Sami Department of Banwa Province in western Burkina Faso.

Population
Year	Pop.	±%
1985	270	—
2006	400	+48.1%
2019	721	+80.2%
