= Sama, Burkina Faso =

Coordinates: 11°47′N 4°19′W

Sama
- Interactive map of Sama
- Country: Burkina Faso
- Region: Boucle du Mouhoun
- Province: Banwa Province
- Department: Kouka Department

Population (2019)
  - Total: 5,580
- Time zone: UTC+0 (GMT 0)

Sama is a town in the Kouka Department of Banwa Province in western Burkina Faso.

Population
Year	Pop.	±%
1985	3,263	—
2006	4,689	+43.7%
2019	5,580	+19.0%
