= Sanaba, Burkina Faso =

Sanaba
- Location within Burkina Faso, West Africa
- Coordinates: 12°24′24″N 3°48′46″W
- Country: Burkina Faso
- Region: Boucle du Mouhoun
- Province: Banwa
- Department: Sanaba

Population (2019)
  - Total: 7,112
- Time zone: UTC+0 (GMT)

Sanaba is the capital of the Sanaba Department in the Boucle du Mouhoun Region of Burkina Faso.

Population
Year	Pop.	±%
1985	4,160	—
2006	7,112	+71.0%
2019	7,570	+6.4%
