= Déré =

- Country: Burkina Faso
- Region: Boucle du Mouhoun
- Province: Banwa Province
- Department: Sami Department

Population (2019)
  - Total: 898
- Time zone: UTC+0 (GMT 0)

Déré is a village in the Sami Department of Banwa Province in western Burkina Faso.

Population
Year	Pop.	±%
1985	245	—
2006	703	+186.9%
2019	898	+27.7%
