= Balavé =

- Location in Burkina Faso
- Coordinates: 12°23′N 4°9′W
- Country: Burkina Faso
- Region: Boucle du Mouhoun
- Province: Banwa Province
- Department: Balavé Department

Population (2019)
  - Total: 7,882
- Time zone: UTC+0 (GMT 0)

Balavé is the capital of the Balavé Department of Banwa Province in western Burkina Faso.

Population
Year	Pop.	±%
1985	3,041	—
2006	5,108	+68.0%
2019	7,882	+54.3%
