= Bama, Burkina Faso =

Bama
- Location in Burkina Faso
- Coordinates: 12°2′N 4°24′W
- Country: Burkina Faso
- Region: Boucle du Mouhoun
- Province: Banwa
- Department: Solenzo

Population (2019)
  - Total: 1,322
- Time zone: UTC+0 (GMT 0)

Bama is a village in the Solenzo Department of Banwa Province in western Burkina Faso.

This village should not be confused with the much larger town of Bama, the capital of Bama Department in Houet Province, Hauts-Bassins Region.

Population
Year	Pop.	±%
2006	1,005	—
2019	1,322	+31.5%
