= Solenzo massacre =

- Part of Jihadist insurgency in Burkina Faso
- Location: Near Solenzo, Boucle du Mouhoun Region, Burkina Faso
- Date: March 10-11, 2025
- Target: Fulani civilians
- Deaths: 130+
- Injuries: Unknown
- Perpetrators: VDP and 18th BIR

Between March 10 and 11, 2025, militiamen from the pro-government Volunteers for the Defense of the Homeland executed at least 130 Fulani civilians in several villages near Solenzo, Boucle du Mouhoun Region, Burkina Faso.

== Background ==
Much of northern Burkina Faso has been the frontline of an insurgency waged by Jama'at Nasr al-Islam wal-Muslimin and the Islamic State in the Greater Sahara since 2015, with these groups intensifying their attacks on civilians seen as sympathetic to the government since 2019. Within Burkina Faso, ISGS is predominantly active in the tri-border area between Mali, Niger, and Burkina Faso. Since the September 2022 Burkina Faso coup d'état that saw Ibrahim Traoré rise to power, the Burkinabe government and VDP auxiliaries have conducted massacres against civilian areas that have killed hundreds of civilians.

At the beginning of March, there was an attack by jihadists against VDP in the area and local Fulani were suspected of harboring the perpetrators. Residents of the area advised the Fulani to move their families and their cattle herds to Ivory Coast to avoid reprisals. As the Fulani were leaving the Solenzo area, they were intercepted by soldiers from the VDP and the 18th BIR of the Burkinabe military.

== Massacre ==
The perpetrators of the massacre broadcast many gruesome videos of the killings. They stated they were part of the "Mahona Self-Defense Group" and "Kouka Rapid Forces". In the videos, armed men step over dozens of bodies either tied up or shot. There was also a baby screaming at the top of his lungs atop the bodies of his parents. The executioners were boastful during the videos, according to Sahel expert Wassim Nasr.

Human Rights Watch stated that the victims in the videos appeared to be Fulani, and that "the comments made by the armed individuals who filmed their own abuses go well beyond hate speech." Laria Allegrozzi, a researcher at HRW, stated that there was no exact death toll. HRW counted 58 bodies in the videos, but due to the bodies being stacked on top of each other it is unknown how many were killed. The number of victims was later identified as over 130.

== Aftermath ==
=== Reactions ===
On March 15, the Burkinabe government denied that their forces were involved in the massacre, and that the videos were part of a "vast disinformation campaign ... to discredit our valiant fighters and frighten the peaceful population." The government stated that they discovered the bodies after a jihadist attack when the militants used the civilians as human shields.

Jama'at Nasr al-Islam wal-Muslimin (JNIM) released photos of survivors of the massacre, who they said will be rehabilitated.

=== Attacks ===
JNIM launched two reprisal attacks for the Solenzo massacre; the first occurred on March 28 at Diapaga, where at least 50 Burkinabe soldiers and VDP were killed. On April 8, JNIM stated that the Diapaga attack was "the beginning of revenge for Solenzo". On April 3, JNIM fighters killed over 200 people, mostly VDP and Burkinabe army recruits from the Sourou Valley, in the villages of Di, Guiedougou, and Lanfiera.
