= Rahim Ouédraogo =

Burkinabé footballer (born 1980)

Personal information
- Full name: Mamy Rahim Assane Ouédraogo
- Date of birth: 8 October 1980 (age 46)
- Place of birth: Bobo-Dioulasso, Upper Volta
- Height: 1.82 m (6 ft 0 in)
- Position: Defender

Youth career
- ASF Bobo
- 1996–1998: Twente

Senior career*
Years	Team	Apps	(Gls)
1998–2007	Twente	141	(0)
2001–2002	→ Zwolle (loan)	14	(1)
2007	Skoda Xanthi	5	(0)
2007–2008	Heracles Almelo	19	(0)
2009	Emmen	13	(1)
2009	Manisaspor	4	(0)
2010	Emmen	9	(0)
Total		205	(2)

International career
1999–2007	Burkina Faso	21	(4)
- * Club domestic league appearances and goals

Mamy Rahim Assane Ouédraogo (born 8 October 1980) is a Burkinabé former professional footballer who played as a defender.

== Club career ==
Ouédraogo, whose preferred position on the field was as a defender, joined Twente at the age of 16, accompanying his brother-in-law to Enschede who was going to study. He played for Twente until 2007. In the 2000–01 season, he had a brief stint at Zwolle on loan.

On 5 August 2009, he joined Manisaspor, signing a two-year contract with the Turkish club. However, on 23 December 2009, his contract was mutually terminated. In January 2010, he returned to Emmen, where he had played before joining Manisaspor, signing until the end of the season.

== International career ==
Ouédraogo was a member of the Burkinabé 2004 African Cup of Nations team, which finished at the bottom of their group in the first round, failing to secure qualification for the quarter-finals.

== After football ==
In February 2011, Ouédraogo started a bus route between the two largest cities in the country: the capital Ouagadougou and his hometown Bobo-Dioulasso. These buses serve the transportation needs of both goods and people. In December 2011, he revealed plans to establish a football school in Bama in 2012, alongside Mamadou Zongo and Ousmane Sanou. In 2012, he established Rahimo FC, and two of his players, Lassina Traoré and Issa Kaboré, subsequently achieved success for Ajax and Manchester City, respectively.
