= Lanfiéra =

Coordinates: 12°59′N 3°25′W

- Interactive map of Lanfiéra
- Country: Burkina Faso
- Region: Boucle du Mouhoun
- Province: Banwa Province
- Department: Solenzo Department

Population (2019)
  - Total: 694
- Time zone: UTC+0 (GMT 0)

Lanfiéra is a village in the Solenzo Department of Banwa Province in western Burkina Faso.

Population
| Year | Pop. | ±% |
|---|---|---|
| 2006 | 703 | — |
| 2019 | 694 | −1.3% |
