= Kouka, Banwa =

Kouka
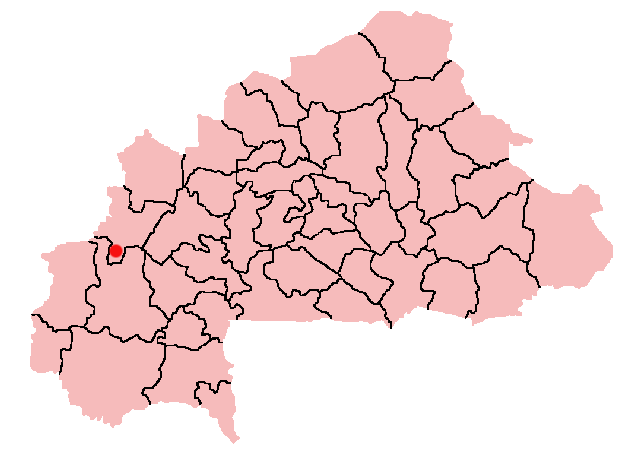
- Location within Burkina Faso

- Location within Burkina Faso, West Africa
- Coordinates: 11°54′N 4°20′W
- Country: Burkina Faso
- Region: Boucle du Mouhoun
- Province: Banwa
- Department: Kouka
- Elevation: 310 m (1,020 ft)

Population (2019 census)
  - Total: 17,286
- Time zone: UTC+0 (GMT)

Kouka (also, Kuko, Kouko, and Kouba) is the capital of the Kouka Department in Banwa Province in Burkina Faso. The Bobo-Oule-inhabited town was besieged for 3 months by Ousman-Oule, grandson of Sekou Watara, and incorporated into the Kong Empire in the early 18th century.

Population
Year	Pop.	±%
1985	8,599	—
2006	12,878	+49.8%
2019	17,286	+34.2%
