= Bayé, Burkina Faso =

Coordinates: 12°04′N 4°05′W

Bayé
- Interactive map of Bayé
- Country: Burkina Faso
- Region: Boucle du Mouhoun
- Province: Banwa Province
- Department: Solenzo Department

Population (2019)
  - Total: 6,860
- Time zone: UTC+0 (GMT 0)

Bayé is a town in the Solenzo Department of Banwa Province in western Burkina Faso.

Population
Year	Pop.	±%
1985	3,535	—
2006	6,043	+70.9%
2019	6,860	+13.5%
