= Bonza, Burkina Faso =

Coordinates: 11°25′N 3°13′W

Bonza
- Interactive map of Bonza
- Country: Burkina Faso
- Region: Boucle du Mouhoun
- Province: Banwa Province
- Department: Solenzo Department

Population (2019)
  - Total: 7,090
- Time zone: UTC+0 (GMT 0)

Bonza is a town in the Solenzo Department of Banwa Province in western Burkina Faso.

Population
Year	Pop.	±%
1985	3,128	—
2006	6,005	+92.0%
2019	7,090	+18.1%
