= I Dare You =

I Dare You may refer to:

- "I Dare You" (Kelly Clarkson song), 2020
- "I Dare You" (Shinedown song), 2006
- "I Dare You", a song by Bea Miller from her 2015 album Not an Apology
- "I Dare You" (The xx song), a song by The xx from their 2017 album I See You
- I Dare You (Canadian TV program), a 2006–2007 Canadian children's television program
- I Dare You (Philippine TV series), a 2011–2013 Philippine reality variety television series
- I Dare You: The Ultimate Challenge, a 2000 American television game show
- "Mission to the Big Hot Thingy / I Dare You", an episode of The Angry Beavers
- I Dare You!, a book by William H. Danforth

== See also ==
- Dare (disambiguation)
