= Samah =

Samah may refer to:

- Sanya, also known as Samah, city in Hainan, China
- Samah, Iran, village in South Khorasan Province, Iran
- Samah people, subgroup of Bajau people
- Samakh, Tiberias, a depopulated Palestinian village

== Person ==
- Borhan Abu Samah (1964–1999), Singaporean footballer
- Hamzah Abu Samah (1924–2012), Malaysian politician
- Shahurain Abu Samah (born 1986), Malaysian footballer
