= Lanfiera Department =

Coordinates: 12°59′N 3°25′W

Lanfiera
- Department
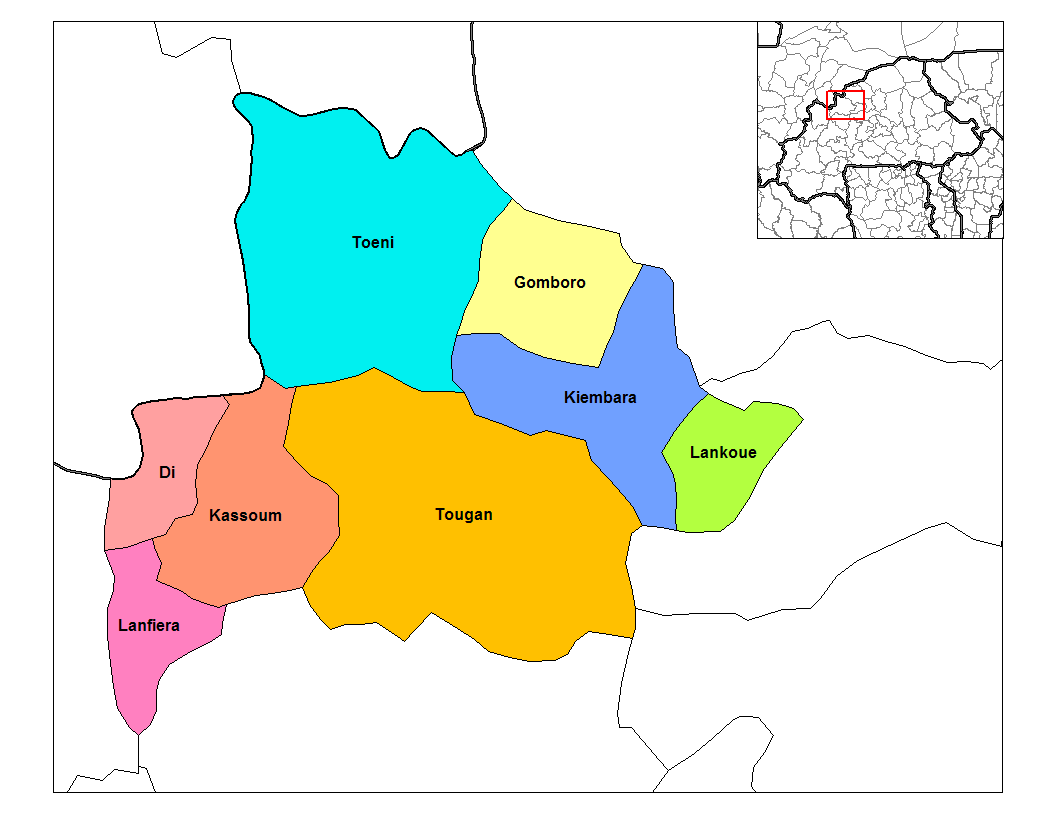
- Lanfiera Department location in the province
- Country: Burkina Faso
- Province: Sourou Province
- Time zone: UTC+0 (GMT 0)

Lanfiera is a department or commune of Sourou Province in north-western Burkina Faso. Its capital lies at the town of Lanfiera.
