= Fini, Burkina Faso =

Fini
- Location in Burkina Faso
- Coordinates: 11°49′N 4°23′W
- Country: Burkina Faso
- Region: Boucle du Mouhoun
- Province: Banwa Province
- Department: Kouka Department

Population (2019)
  - Total: 2,179
- Time zone: UTC+0 (GMT 0)

Fini is a town in the Kouka Department of Banwa Province in western Burkina Faso.

Population
Year	Pop.	±%
1985	2,092	—
2006	3,233	+54.5%
2019	2,179	−32.6%
