= Toukoro =

Toukoro may refer to places in Burkina Faso:

- Toukoro, Banwa
- Toukoro, Comoé
