= Toukoro, Banwa =

Toukoro
- Country: Burkina Faso
- Region: Boucle du Mouhoun
- Province: Banwa Province
- Department: Solenzo Department

Population (2019)
  - Total: 6,249
- Time zone: UTC+0 (GMT 0)

Toukoro is a town in the Solenzo Department of Banwa Province in western Burkina Faso.

Population
Year	Pop.	±%
1985	2,870	—
2006	5,332	+85.8%
2019	6,249	+17.2%
