= Deir =

Deir or DEIR may refer to:

- Deir in Glossary of Arabic toponyms
- Ed-Deir, Petra, English: 'The Monastery', a monumental rock-cut structure in Jordan
- Tell Deir, an archaeological site in Lebanon
- Deir ez-Zor or Ad-Deir, a city in Syria
- Draft environmental impact report, a document required in United States environmental law

== People with the surname ==
- Edward Deir (1915–1990), Canadian canoeist

== See also ==
- , include many place names and names of buildings, as deir is Arabic for 'monastery' or 'convent'
- Dair, the seventh letter of the Ogham alphabet
- Der (disambiguation)
- Deyr (disambiguation)
