= Toungo, Burkina Faso =

Toungo
- Country: Burkina Faso
- Region: Boucle du Mouhoun
- Province: Banwa Province
- Department: Tansila Department

Population (2019)
  - Total: 1,718
- Time zone: UTC+0 (GMT 0)

Toungo is a town in the Tansila Department of Banwa Province in western Burkina Faso.

Population
Year	Pop.	±%
1985	848	—
2006	1,184	+39.6%
2019	1,718	+45.1%
