= Pouy, Burkina Faso =

Pouy
- Country: Burkina Faso
- Region: Boucle du Mouhoun
- Province: Banwa Province
- Department: Solenzo Department

Population (2019)
  - Total: 1,342
- Time zone: UTC+0 (GMT 0)

Pouy, Burkina Faso is a town in the Solenzo Department of Banwa Province in western Burkina Faso.

Population
Year	Pop.	±%
1985	496	—
2006	1,095	+120.8%
2019	1,342	+22.6%
