= Abroubagui Salbre =

Burkinabé footballer

Abroubagui Salbre Abas
Personal information
- Full name: Abroubagui Salbre Abas
- Date of birth: 4 August 1993 (age 33)
- Place of birth: Burkina Faso
- Height: 1.91 m (6 ft 3 in)
- Position: Striker

Team information
- Current team: Portogruaro
- Number: 55

Youth career
- Portogruaro

Senior career*
Years	Team	Apps	(Gls)
2010–2012	Portogruaro	7	(0)
2013	A.S.D. Union Quinto	17	(8)
2013–	A.C. Belluno 1905		
- * Club domestic league appearances and goals as of 1 June 2014

Abroubagui Salbre is a Burkinabé professional footballer who plays as a winger for A.C. Belluno 1905 in Serie D.

== Career ==
Born in Diapaga, Tapoa Province in Burkina Faso, when he was child he moved to Italy and later he joined Portogruaro, being initially assigned to the reserve team in the campionato berretti.

On 8 January 2012 Salbre made his Lega Pro debut, coming on as a late substitute in a 1–4 away win against Pergocrema.
