= Metopocoilus =

Scientific classification
- Domain: Eukaryota
- Kingdom: Animalia
- Phylum: Arthropoda
- Class: Insecta
- Order: Coleoptera
- Suborder: Polyphaga
- Infraorder: Cucujiformia
- Family: Cerambycidae
- Subfamily: Cerambycinae
- Tribe: Trachyderini
- Genus: Metopocoilus; Audinet-Serville, 1832

Genus of beetles

Metopocoilus is a genus of beetles in the family Cerambycidae, containing the following species:

- Metopocoilus corumbaensis Lane, 1956
- Metopocoilus giganteus Nonfried, 1894
- Metopocoilus longissimum (Tippmann, 1953)
- Metopocoilus maculicollis Audinet-Serville, 1832
- Metopocoilus picticornis Melzer, 1923
- Metopocoilus quadrispinosus (Buquet, 1860)
- Metopocoilus rojasi Sallé, 1853
