= Kouka Department =

Coordinates: 11°54′N 4°20′W

Kouka
- Department
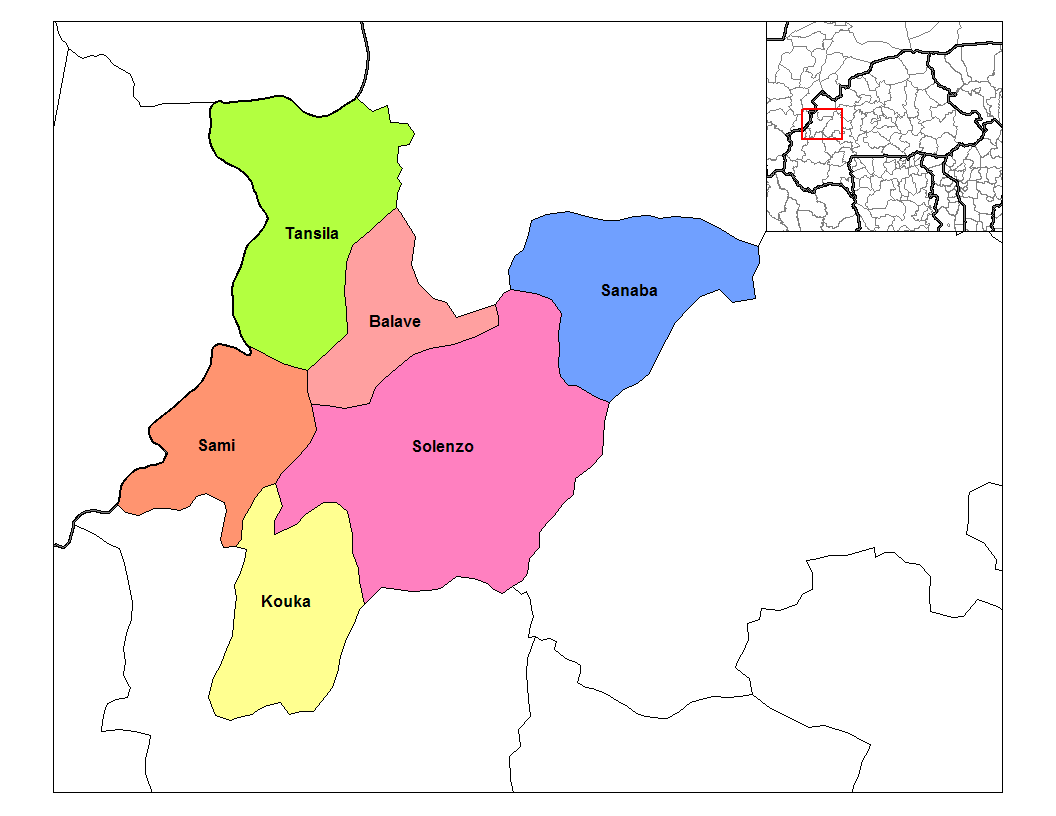
- Kouka Department location in the province
- Country: Burkina Faso
- Province: Banwa Province

Area
  - Total: 303.6 sq mi (786.3 km^{2})

Population (2019 census)
  - Total: 73,747
  - Density: 242.9/sq mi (93.79/km^{2})
- Time zone: UTC+0 (GMT 0)

Kouka is a department or commune of Banwa Province in western Burkina Faso. Its capital is the town of Kouka. According to the 2019 census the department has a total population of 73,747.

== Towns and villages ==
The largest towns and villages and populations in the department are as follows:

- Kouka (10,187 inhabitants) (capital)
- Bankouma (3 349 inhabitants)
- Bourawali (417 inhabitants)
- Diontala (4,191 inhabitants)
- Fini (3,009 inhabitants)
- Houna (3,483 inhabitants)
- Kouelworo (923 inhabitants)
- Koulakou (1,454 inhabitants)
- Kouroumani (2,359 inhabitants)
- Liaba (541 inhabitants)
- Mahouana (7,019 inhabitants)
- Mollé (3,539 inhabitants)
- Saint-Michel (667 inhabitants)
- Sallé (2,930 inhabitants)
- Sama (3,853 inhabitants)
- Sélenkoro (1 111 inhabitants)
- Siwi (4,383 inhabitants)
