= Dare =

Dare may refer to:

== Places ==
- Dare, Vera Cruz, a suco in Vera Cruz administrative post, Dili Municipality, Timor-Leste
- Darè, Italy, a comune
- Dare County, North Carolina, United States
- Dare, Virginia, United States, an unincorporated community

== Name ==
- Dare (name), a list of people and fictional characters with either the surname or given name

== Arts and entertainment ==
=== Music ===
- Dare (band), a band fronted by Darren Wharton
- Dare (album), a 1981 album by The Human League
- "Dare" (song), a 2005 song by Gorillaz
- "Dare", a song by Stan Bush from The Transformers: The Movie (Original Motion Picture Soundtrack)
- "Dare (La La La)", a 2014 song by Shakira
- "Dare?!", a 2025 single by Takane Lui

=== Others ===
- Dare (film), a 2009 American romantic drama film
- Dare (novel), a 1965 novel by Philip José Farmer
- Dare, a 2007 novel by BET host Abiola Abrams
- Dare (graffiti artist)
- A challenge to perform a task, as in a game of dares

== In business ==
- Dare Foods, a Canadian food company
- LG Dare, a smartphone

== Acronyms ==
- Dark Ages Radio Explorer, a proposed NASA mission
- Direct Agency / Rep Exchange, a protocol used by television stations and advertisement sales representatives
- Discrete Algebraic Riccati equation, a mathematical relationship
- Drug Abuse Resistance Education, an anti-drug program for students started in the United States
- Defence Avionics Research Establishment, an Indian national defence laboratory
- Dictionary of American Regional English, a dictionary of the different dialects of American English
- Digital Averroes Research Environment, a project to collect and edit the works of Averroes
- Database of Abstracts of Reviews of Effects, part of the Cochrane Library
- Delft Aerospace Rocket Engineering, a student rocketry team from The Netherlands

== See also ==
- English modal verbs § dare
- Truth or Dare (disambiguation)
- Dair, a letter of the Ogham alphabet
- Dáire or Dáre, an Old Irish name
- Dere or Deira, an ancient kingdom in what is now northern England
- Ludum Dare
