= Sanaba Department =

Coordinates: 12.4067°N 3.8128°W

Sanaba
- Department
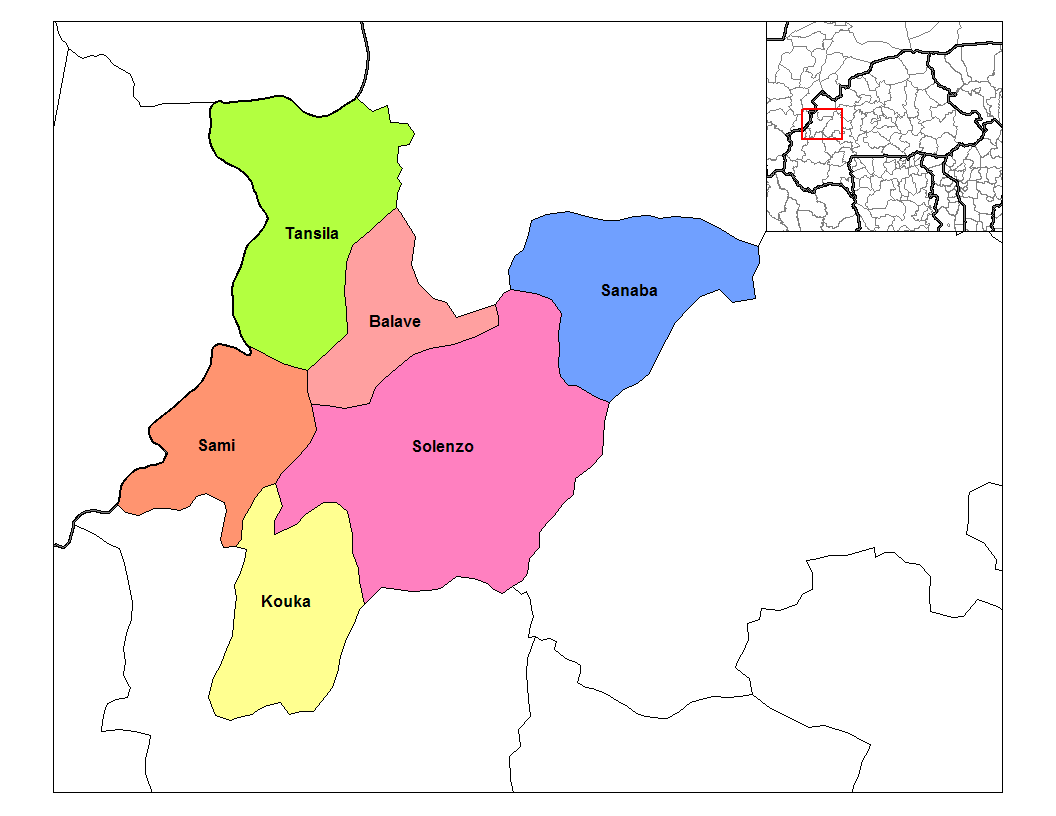
- Sanaba Department location in the province
- Country: Burkina Faso
- Province: Banwa Province

Population (1996)
  - Total: 29,525
- Time zone: UTC+0 (GMT 0)

Sanaba is a department or commune of Banwa Province in western Burkina Faso. Its capital lies at the town of Sanaba. According to the 1996 census the department has a total population of 29,525.

== Towns and villages ==
The largest towns and villages and populations in the department are as follows:

- Sanaba (6 402 inhabitants) (capital)
- Bendougou (2 864 inhabitants)
- Bérenkuy (435 inhabitants)
- Dio (2 107 inhabitants)
- Founa (1 677 inhabitants)
- Gombio (292 inhabitants)
- Gnoumakuy (440 inhabitants)
- Koba (1 207 inhabitants)
- Kosso (435 inhabitants)
- Kossoba (1 975 inhabitants)
- Kounla (452 inhabitants)
- Moussakuy (1 139 inhabitants)
- Nemena (1 017 inhabitants)
- Ouarakuy (549 inhabitants)
- Pekuy (293 inhabitants)
- Sorwa (699 inhabitants)
- Soumakuy (370 inhabitants)
- Timba (241 inhabitants)
- Yenkuy (278 inhabitants)
- Ziga (6 653 inhabitants)
