= 2023 Diapaga attacks =

Mass shooting in Diapanga, Burkina Faso

- Part of Jihadist insurgency in Burkina Faso
- Location: Diapaga, Burkina Faso
- Attack type: Mass shooting
- Deaths: 15+
- Perpetrator: Jihadists (suspected)

On November 21, 2023, a mass shooting occurred in Diapaga, Burkina Faso, when coordinated and synchronized attacks that killed at least 15, predominately civilians. These attacks, believed to be perpetrated by jihadists, targeted two neighborhoods in Diapaga, inflicting casualties including three Volunteers for the Defense of the Homeland (VDP, civilian auxiliaries to the army) and twelve civilians.

Schools, markets, and public services in the region were suspended to honor the victims. The town observed a day of 'ville morte' (dead city) as a tribute. The victims were buried at the Diapaga municipal cemetery.

A security source confirmed that the defense forces counteracted the attack, reportedly neutralizing several dozen assailants and conducting an ongoing air-land operation in the eastern region that had neutralized over fifty terrorists and dismantled several bases. The attack was a flashpoint in a larger conflict that has been ongoing since 2015, attributed to jihadist groups linked to the Islamic State and al-Qaeda.
