= Diapaga =

- Location within Burkina Faso, West Africa
- Coordinates: 12°04′N 1°47′E
- Country: Burkina Faso

Population (2019 census)
  - Total: 15,515
- Time zone: UTC+0 (GMT)

Diapaga is a city in, and the capital of, Tapoa Province, situated in eastern Burkina Faso. The main ethnic group in the city are the Gourmantché. It is a major centre for health services in the region. The W Park militant group of Burkina Faso are reported to have their headquarters in the town.

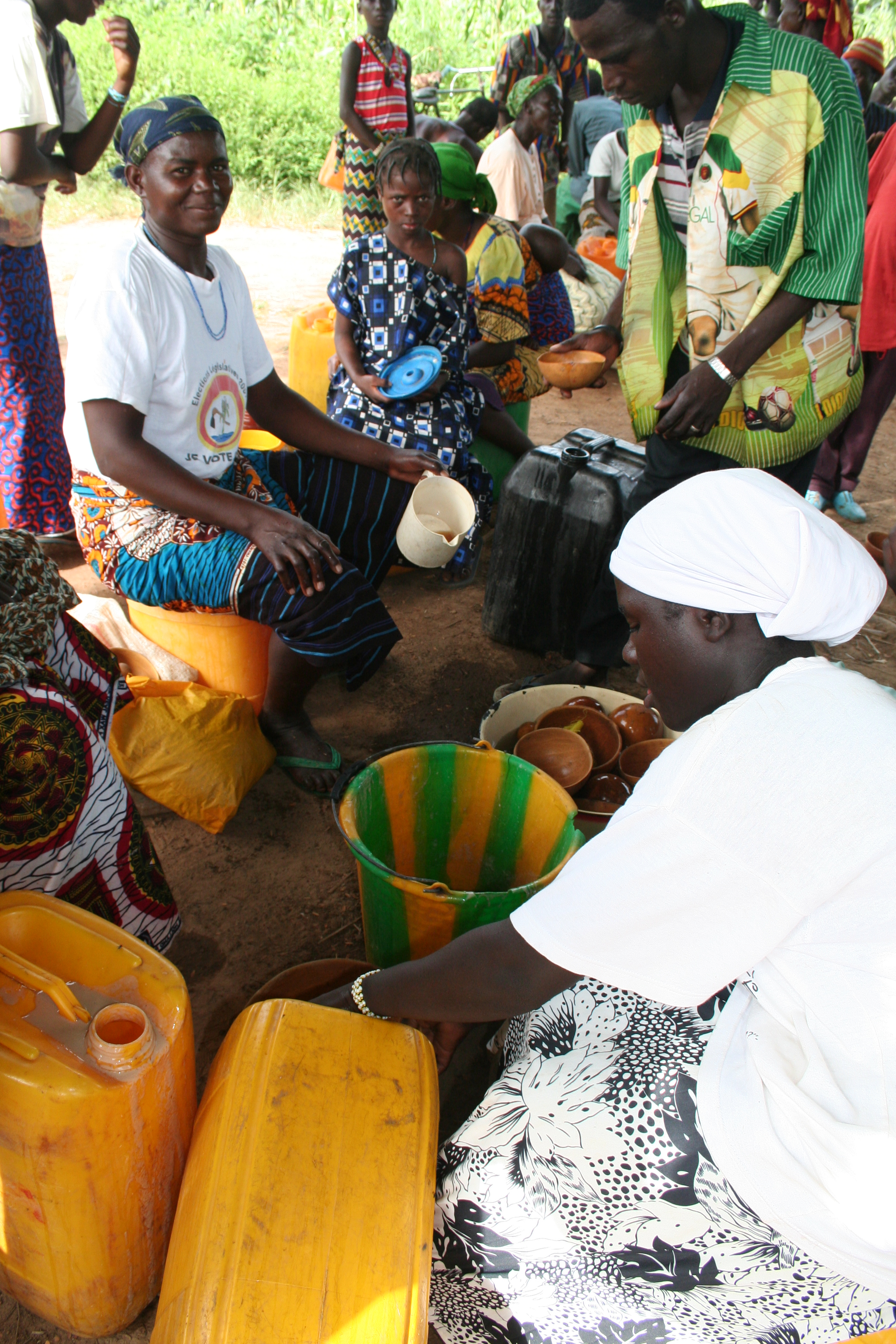
Sorghum beer (Dolo) being served at a market in Tapoa djerma, Burkina Faso

On November 21, 2023, a mass shooting occurred in Diapaga, when coordinated and synchronized attacks that killed at least 15, predominately civilians. The attacks targeted two neighborhoods in Diapaga, inflicting casualties including three Volunteers for the Defense of the Homeland (VDP, civilian auxiliaries to the army) and twelve civilians.

On March 28, 2025, Jama'at Nasr al-Islam wal-Muslimin (JNIM) launched an assault on the Burkinabe army and VDP base in the city, which led to the deaths of over 100 people, including civilians and the commander of the station, Yannick Sawadogo. JNIM claimed the attack was revenge for the Solenzo Massacre, in which over 58 Fulani civilians were massacred by Volunteers for the Defense of the Homeland and the Burkina Faso Armed Forces.

Another attack occurred in Diapaga on May 12, where JNIM proceeded to raid the city, attacking a prison, destroying monuments, and setting fires to businesses. During the prison attack, prisoners were freed, with some being recruited into the ranks of JNIM. On May 21, a video was taken showing armed militants speaking to residents stating that city was completely under their control. On June 9, a Burkinabe military convoy entered the city according to a broadcast from Radio Télévision du Burkina, having left from Fada N'gourma two weeks prior.

== Notable people ==
- Abroubagui Salbre, footballer
