= Tansila Department =

Coordinates: 12°26′N 4°23′W

Tansila
- Department
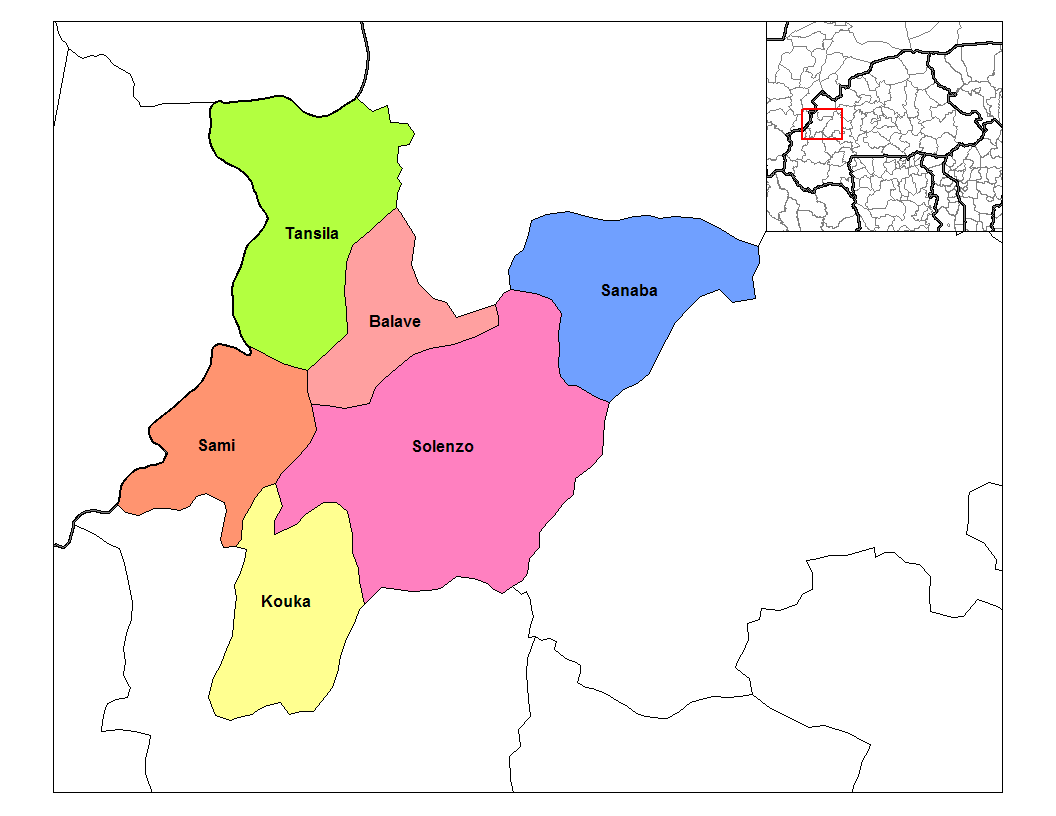
- Tansila Department location in the province
- Country: Burkina Faso
- Province: Banwa Province

Population (1996)
  - Total: 27,714
- Time zone: UTC+0 (GMT 0)

Tansila is a department or commune of Banwa Province in western Burkina Faso. Its capital lies at the town of Tansila. According to the 1996 census the department has a total population of 27,714.

== Towns and villages ==
The largest towns and villages and populations in the department are as follows:

- Tansila (3 876 inhabitants) (capital)
- Ben (901 inhabitants)
- Bouan (682 inhabitants)
- Darsalam (1 107 inhabitants)
- Douma (1 154 inhabitants)
- Driko (1 050 inhabitants)
- Faso-benkadi (917 inhabitants)
- Féléwé (144 inhabitants)
- Gui (660 inhabitants)
- Kéllé (1 343 inhabitants)
- Kira (671 inhabitants)
- Kokouna (1 385 inhabitants)
- Korani (767 inhabitants)
- Kouneni (1 128 inhabitants)
- Moara (875 inhabitants)
- Nangouna (1 483 inhabitants)
- Ouléni (326 inhabitants)
- Ouorowé (2 479 inhabitants)
- Tamouga (560 inhabitants)
- Thy (435 inhabitants)
- Tillé (718 inhabitants)
- Toma (1 459 inhabitants)
- Toma Koura (150 inhabitants)
- Toula (1 407 inhabitants)
- Toungo (1 350 inhabitants)
- Triko (687 inhabitants)
