= Solenzo Department =

Coordinates: 12°11′N 4°5′W

Solenzo
- Department
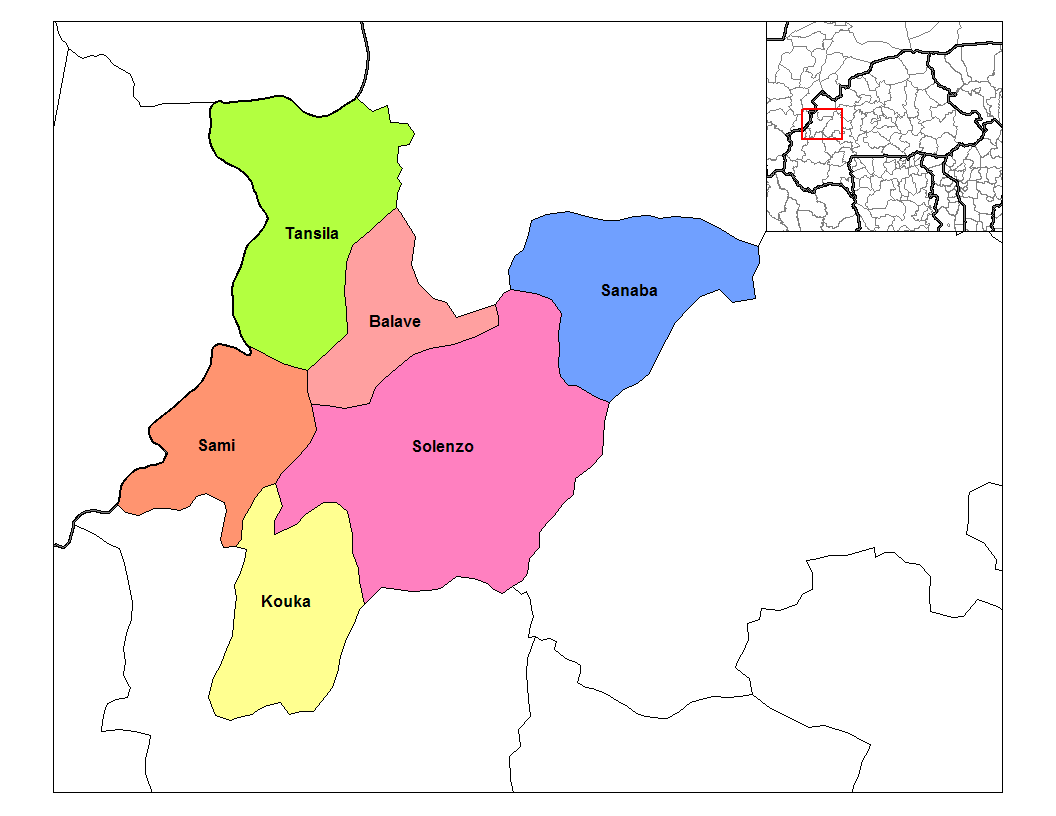
- Solenzo Department location in the province
- Country: Burkina Faso
- Province: Banwa Province

Area
  - Department: 735 sq mi (1,903 km^{2})

Population (2019 census)
  - Department: 157,596
  - Density: 214.5/sq mi (82.81/km^{2})
  - Urban: 24,783
- Time zone: UTC+0 (GMT 0)

Solenzo is a department or commune of Banwa Province in western Burkina Faso. Its capital is the town of Solenzo. According to the 2019 census the department has a total population of 157,596.

== Towns and villages ==
The largest towns and villages and populations in the department are as follows:

- Solenzo (14 387 inhabitants) (capital)
- Bama (1 080 inhabitants)
- Ban (8 776 inhabitants)
- Bayé (5 478 inhabitants)
- Bèna (11 963 inhabitants)
- Bialé (1 892 inhabitants)
- Bonza (5 209 inhabitants)
- Daboura (7 285 inhabitants)
- Darsalam (3 114 inhabitants)
- Dèssè (1 756 inhabitants)
- Dinkiéna (4 593 inhabitants)
- Denkoro (2 490 inhabitants)
- Dira (3 209 inhabitants)
- Dissankuy (2 794 inhabitants)
- Gnassoumadougou (3 329 inhabitants)
- Kiè (6 212 inhabitants)
- Koakoa (881 inhabitants)
- Koma, Burkina Faso (1 941 inhabitants)
- Hèrèdougou (3 205 inhabitants)
- Lanfiéra (617 inhabitants)
- Lèkoro (1 668 inhabitants)
- Masso (2 465 inhabitants)
- Mawé (2 329 inhabitants)
- Montionkuy (786 inhabitants)
- Moussakongo (3 310 inhabitants)
- Pouy (1 059 inhabitants)
- Sanakuy (2 327 inhabitants)
- Siguinonghin (3 683 inhabitants)
- Toukoro (5 277 inhabitants)
- Yèrèssoro (2 812 inhabitants)
