= Metopocoilus picticornis =

Scientific classification
- Kingdom: Animalia
- Phylum: Arthropoda
- Class: Insecta
- Order: Coleoptera
- Suborder: Polyphaga
- Infraorder: Cucujiformia
- Family: Cerambycidae
- Genus: Metopocoilus
- Species: M. picticornis

Binomial name
- Metopocoilus picticornis Melzer, 1923

Species of beetle

Metopocoilus picticornis is a species of beetle in the family Cerambycidae. It was described by Melzer in 1923.
