= Metopocoilus giganteus =

Scientific classification
- Kingdom: Animalia
- Phylum: Arthropoda
- Class: Insecta
- Order: Coleoptera
- Suborder: Polyphaga
- Infraorder: Cucujiformia
- Family: Cerambycidae
- Genus: Metopocoilus
- Species: M. giganteus

Binomial name
- Metopocoilus giganteus Nonfried, 1894

Species of beetle

Metopocoilus giganteus is a species of beetle in the family Cerambycidae. It was described by Nonfried in 1894.
