= Balavé Department =

Coordinates: 12°23′00″N 4°09′00″W

Balavé
- Department
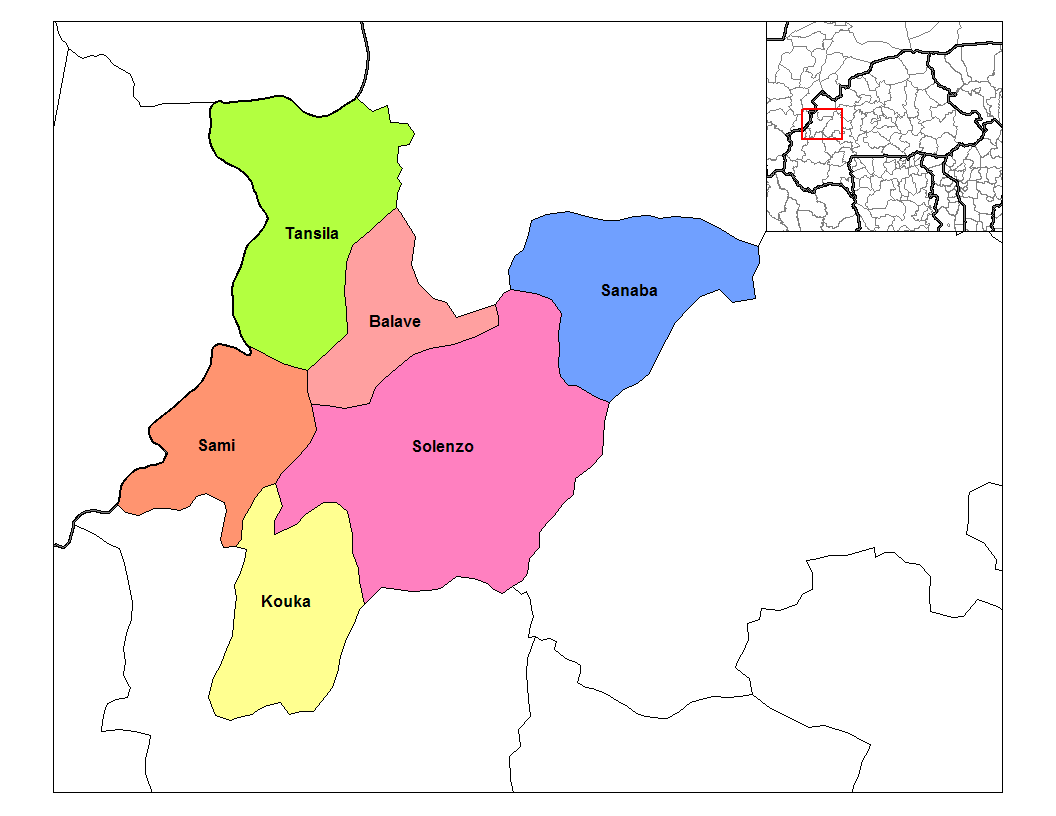
- Balavé Department location in the province
- Country: Burkina Faso
- Province: Banwa Province

Area
  - Total: 209.9 sq mi (543.6 km^{2})

Population (2019 census)
  - Total: 24,103
  - Density: 114.8/sq mi (44.34/km^{2})
- Time zone: UTC+0 (GMT 0)

Balavé is a department or commune of Banwa Province in western Burkina Faso. Its capital lies at the town of Balavé. According to the 2019 census the department has a total population of 24,103.

== Towns and villages ==
The largest towns and villages and populations in the department are as follows:

- Balavé (4 700 inhabitants) (capital)
- Badinga (1 948 inhabitants)
- Doga (813 inhabitants)
- Gama (735 inhabitants)
- Hasbialaye (845 inhabitants)
- Lago (611 inhabitants)
- Tangouna (977 inhabitants)
- Yasso (4 191 inhabitants)
