= Sami Department =

Coordinates: 12°10′N 4°10′W

Sami
- Department
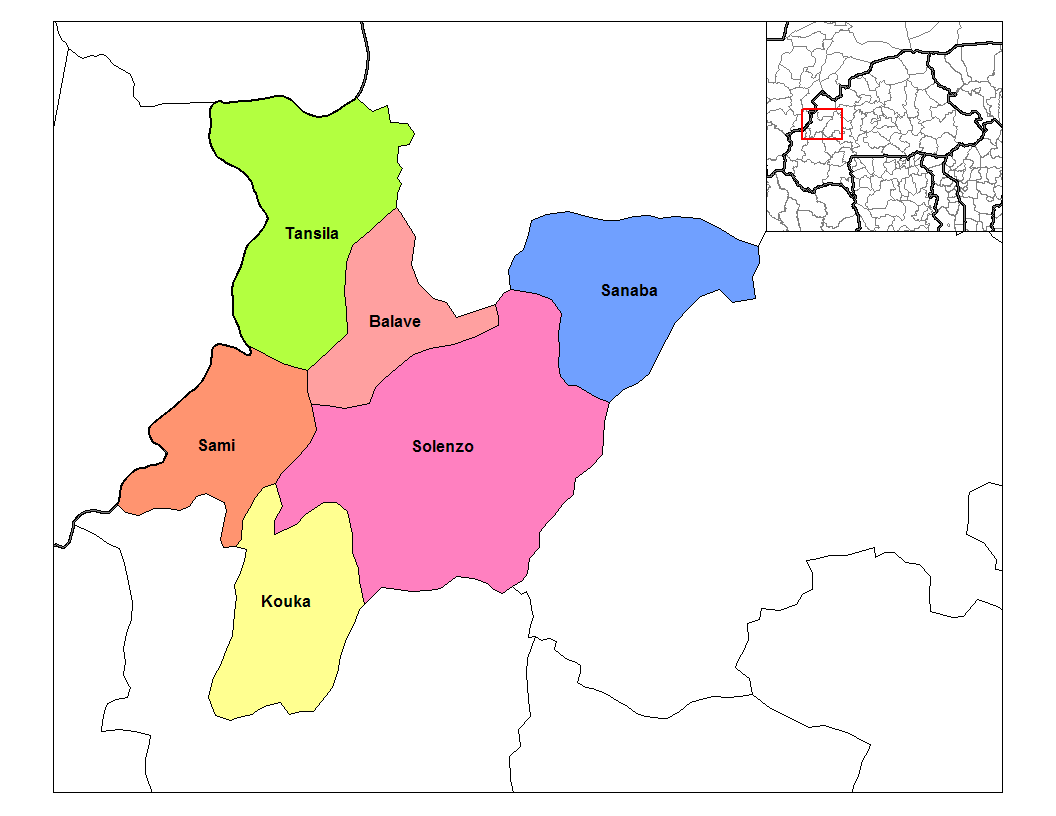
- Sami Department location in the province
- Country: Burkina Faso
- Province: Banwa Province

Area
  - Total: 247.9 sq mi (642.1 km^{2})

Population (2019 census)
  - Total: 13,596
  - Density: 54.84/sq mi (21.17/km^{2})
- Time zone: UTC+0 (GMT 0)

Sami is a department or commune of Banwa Province in western Burkina Faso. Its capital lies at the town of Sami. According to the 2019 census the department has a total population of 13,596.

== Villages ==
The largest villages and populations in the department are as follows:

- Sami (340 inhabitants)
- Bonkorowé (330 inhabitants)
- Déré (608 inhabitants)
- Dima (489 inhabitants)
- Dimibo (599 inhabitants)
- Priwé (2 632 inhabitants)
- Sagoéta (632 inhabitants)
- Seindé (304 inhabitants)
- Sogodjankoli (1 769 inhabitants)
