= Dere =

Dere may refer to:

== Places ==
- Deira, a kingdom in Northern England (559-664)
- Déré, a village in Sami Department, Banwa Province, Burkina Faso
- Dere, Iraq, a village in Amedi District, Dohuk province, Iraqi Kurdistan
- Dere, Karaman, a village in Karaman Province, Turkey
- Dere, Kozluk, a village in Batman Province, Turkey
- Dere Street, a Roman road from York into what is now Scotland

== People ==
- Dere (singer) (born 2002), Indonesian singer-songwriter
- Ali Dere (born 1992), Turkish footballer
- Alifereti Dere (1961–2026), Fijian rugby union footballer and coach
- Cansu Dere (born 1980), Turkish actress
- Jean Déré (1886–1970), French composer
- Laslo Đere or Laslo Djere (born 1995), Serbian tennis player
- Revati Mohite Dere, Indian judge

== Other uses ==
- Dere (beetle), a genus of longhorn beetles in the family Cerambycidae
