= Metopocoilus maculicollis =

Scientific classification
- Domain: Eukaryota
- Kingdom: Animalia
- Phylum: Arthropoda
- Class: Insecta
- Order: Coleoptera
- Suborder: Polyphaga
- Infraorder: Cucujiformia
- Family: Cerambycidae
- Genus: Metopocoilus
- Species: M. maculicollis

Binomial name
- Metopocoilus maculicollis (Audinet-Serville, 1832)

Species of beetle

Metopocoilus maculicollis is a species of beetle in the family Cerambycidae. It was described by Audinet-Serville in 1832.
