= Metopocoilus longissimum =

Scientific classification
- Domain: Eukaryota
- Kingdom: Animalia
- Phylum: Arthropoda
- Class: Insecta
- Order: Coleoptera
- Suborder: Polyphaga
- Infraorder: Cucujiformia
- Family: Cerambycidae
- Genus: Metopocoilus
- Species: M. longissimum

Binomial name
- Metopocoilus longissimum (Tippmann, 1953)

Species of beetle

Metopocoilus longissimum is a species of beetle in the family Cerambycidae. It was described by Tippmann in 1953.
