= Metopocoilus quadrispinosus =

Scientific classification
- Domain: Eukaryota
- Kingdom: Animalia
- Phylum: Arthropoda
- Class: Insecta
- Order: Coleoptera
- Suborder: Polyphaga
- Infraorder: Cucujiformia
- Family: Cerambycidae
- Genus: Metopocoilus
- Species: M. quadrispinosus

Binomial name
- Metopocoilus quadrispinosus (Buquet, 1860)

Species of beetle

Metopocoilus quadrispinosus is a species of beetle in the family Cerambycidae. It was described by Buquet in 1860.
