= 795 Fini =

Main-base asteroid

Discovery
- Discovered by: J. Palisa
- Discovery site: Vienna Obs.
- Discovery date: 26 September 1914

Designations
- Named after: unknown
- Alternative designations: A914 SF · 1940 GY; 1946 UR · 1951 UR; 1958 JC · 1914 VE
- Minor planet category: main-belt · (middle); background

Orbital characteristics
- Epoch 31 May 2020 (JD 2459000.5)
- Uncertainty parameter 0
- Observation arc: 102.89 yr (37,580 d)
- Aphelion: 3.0304 AU
- Perihelion: 2.4674 AU
- Semi-major axis: 2.7489 AU
- Eccentricity: 0.1024
- Orbital period (sidereal): 4.56 yr (1,665 d)
- Mean anomaly: 206.63°
- Mean motion: 0° 12^{m} 58.68^{s} / day
- Inclination: 19.051°
- Longitude of ascending node: 17.377°
- Argument of perihelion: 190.18°

Physical characteristics
- Dimensions: 75.0 km × 75.0 km
- Mean diameter: 74.66±1.4 km; 76.201±1.634 km; 79.36±1.05 km
- Synodic rotation period: 7.59±0.001 h (Note: Lightcurve plot of (795) Fini, at the Palmer Divide Observatory, B. D. Warner (2010). Rotation period 7.586±0.001 h hours with a brightness amplitude of 0.02±0.01 mag. Quality code of 1+. Summary figures at the LCDB.); 9.292±0.001 h
- Geometric albedo: 0.037±0.001; 0.040±0.006; 0.0418±0.002
- Spectral type: SMASS = C; C (MOVIS)
- Absolute magnitude (H): 9.70; 10.0

795 Fini (prov. designation: A914 SF or 1914 VE) is a dark and large background asteroid, approximately 76 kilometers (47 miles) in diameter, located in the central region of the asteroid belt. It was discovered by Austrian astronomer Johann Palisa at the Vienna Observatory on 26 September 1914. The carbonaceous C-type asteroid has a poorly determined rotation period of 9.3 hours and seems rather spherical in shape. Any reference of the asteroid's name to a person is unknown.

== Orbit and classification ==
Fini is a non-family asteroid of the main belt's background population when applying the hierarchical clustering method to its proper orbital elements. It orbits the Sun in the central main-belt at a distance of 2.5–3.0 AU once every 4 years and 7 months (1,665 days; semi-major axis of 2.75 AU). Its orbit has an eccentricity of 0.10 and an inclination of 19° with respect to the ecliptic. The body's observation arc begins at Vienna Observatory on 16 March 1917, where it was officially discovered two and a half years before.

== Naming ==
"Fini" is an Austrian diminutive of Josephine. Any reference of this minor planet's name to a person or occurrence is unknown.

=== Unknown meaning ===
Among the many thousands of named minor planets, Fini is one of 120 asteroids for which no official naming citation has been published. All of these asteroids have low numbers, the first being 164 Eva. The last asteroid with a name of unknown meaning is 1514 Ricouxa. They were discovered between 1876 and the 1930s, predominantly by astronomers Auguste Charlois, Johann Palisa, Max Wolf and Karl Reinmuth.

== Physical characteristics ==
In the Tholen classification, Fini is a common, carbonaceous C-type asteroid. It is also a C-type in the taxonomic classification based on near-infrared colors from the MOVIS-catalog, which was created from data gathered by the VISTA Hemisphere Survey conducted with the VISTA telescope at Paranal Observatory in Chile.

=== Rotation period ===
Several rotational lightcurves of Fini have been obtained from photometric observations. However, the asteroid, which shows a notably low brightness variation – indicative of a spherical rather than elongated shape – still has a poorly determined rotation period.

Based on observations from February 2003 and November 2011, Brian Warner at his Palmer Divide Observatory (716) in Colorado, determined three possible period solutions of 7.59±0.001, 8.641±0.002 and 9.292±0.001 hours with corresponding low amplitudes of 0.02±0.01, 0.05±0.02 and 0.06±0.01 magnitude (U=1+/1/1+). Petr Pravec and Peter Kušnirák at Ondřejov Observatory derive a rotation period of 4.65 hours from their observations in October 2001, or half of Warner's period solution, also with an amplitude of 0.2 magnitude (U=1). (Note: Pravec (2012) web: rotation period 4.65 hours with a brightness amplitude of 0.02 mag. Quality Code is 1. Summary figures at the LCDB and Ondrejov Asteroid Photometry Project (data sheet). Comment Pravec, Kusnirak: Period set at a half of the estimate by Warner (2011); H_R = 9.40±0.03, assuming G = 0.12±0.08.) In September 2010, astronomers at the Palomar Transient Factory in California determined an alternative period of 26.971±0.0557 h with a brightness variation of 0.06 magnitude (U=1).

=== Diameter and albedo ===
According to the surveys carried out by the Infrared Astronomical Satellite IRAS, the NEOWISE mission of NASA's Wide-field Infrared Survey Explorer (WISE), and the Japanese Akari satellite, Fini measures (74.66±1.4), (76.201±1.634) and (79.36±1.05) kilometers in diameter and its surface has an albedo of (0.0418±0.002), (0.040±0.006) and (0.037±0.001), respectively. The Collaborative Asteroid Lightcurve Link adopts Petr Pravec's revised WISE-data, that is an albedo of 0.0553 and a diameter of 62.56 kilometers based on an absolute magnitude of 9.78. Alternative mean-diameter measurements published by the WISE team include (54.31±12.96 km), (62.649±2.428 km), (75.71±22.78 km), (85.019±15.58 km) and (85.263±0.454 km) with corresponding albedos of (0.05±0.02), (0.0593±0.0103), (0.040±0.006), (0.0469±0.0880) and (0.027±0.003). On 11 November 2006, an asteroid occultation of Fini gave a best-fit ellipse dimension of (75.0 km × 75.0 km) with a low quality rating of 1. These timed observations are taken when the asteroid passes in front of a distant star.
