= Deyr =

Deyr may refer to:

- Deyr County in Bushehr Province, Iran.
- Bandar Deyr, a town in Deyr County.
- Deir ez-Zor, is the 6th largest city in Syria.
- Deyr is the local name of a rain season in East Africa
