= Digital Averroes Research Environment =

Database of Averroes' texts

DARE
- Website type: Virtual research environment
- Owners: Thomas-Institut, University of Cologne
- Creator: Andreas Speer
- Website: dare.uni-koeln.de
- Commercial: No
- Registration: Optional

The Digital Averroes Research Environment (DARE), funded by the DFG, is a virtual research environment concerned with the works of the Andalusian polymath Averroes.

DARE aims to provide scholars with the digitized manuscripts and incunables of Averroes's works (around 60,000 as of April 2013), as well as edited full texts, where applicable in all three language traditions of Averroes's works: Arabic, Hebrew and Latin. A comprehensive bibliography complements the corpus.

== Content ==
The aim of the Digital Averroes Research Environment is to collect and edit the works of Averroes by making digital editions of his works, and images of all textual witnesses, including manuscripts, incunabula, and early prints, online accessible. The main benefit of the DARE project is the so-called chunks. Each chunk represents a given section of a certain work of Averroes, which can be traced in each other manifestation. By clicking through the different digitized sections, the patched-in section follows automatically the chosen chunk.

== Technical background ==
Text Encoding Initiative (TEI) forms the backbone of DARE's data. The structure of the texts, the manuscript descriptions, the bibliography and the chunks of the full texts are all encoded in TEI. DARE itself runs in a Drupal-content management system (CMS), and the XML server is Xeletor, a highly scalable and performance-oriented XML server, whose development was also in part funded by DARE. As with all software developed in the course of the project, Xeletor is licensed under the LGPL.

== Literature ==
- Poster DH2012
