= Sama (surname) =

Sama is a surname. Notable people with the surname include:

- Balkrishna Sama (1903–1981), Nepalese dramatist
- Catherine M. Sama, professor of Italian at the University of Rhode Island
- Koffi Sama (born 1944), Prime Minister of Togo from 2002 to 2005
- Logan Sama, English Grime DJ from Brentwood, Essex
- Mustapha Sama (born 1979), Sierra Leonean football player
- S. K. Sama (born 1934), Indian gastroenterologist
- Serukalathur Sama, a Tamil film actor
- Stephen Sama (born 1993), Cameroon born German footballer
