= Sama, Chalus =

Sama سمائ
- Village
- Location within Iran
- Coordinates: 36°33′17″N 51°16′24″E
- Country: Iran
- Province: Mazandaran
- County: Chalus
- Bakhsh: Marzanabad
- Rural District: Birun Bashm

Population (2016)
  - Total: 57
- Time zone: UTC+3:30 (IRST)

Sama (Persian: سمائ, also Romanized as Samā’) is a village in Birun Bashm Rural District, in Marzanabad District of Chalus County, Mazandaran Province, Iran.

At the time of the 2006 National Census, the village's population was 68. The following census in 2011 counted less than 4 households. The 2016 census measured the population of the village as 57 people in 25 households.
