= Direct Agency / Rep Electronic Connection =

Direct Agency / Rep Electronic Connection (DARE), or Direct Agency Rep Exchange, is an exchange protocol used by advertising agencies and television station sales representatives to transact and manage electronically spot TV orders, offers, revisions, and confirmations. It was developed by Mediaocean and supported by Imagine Communications.
