= Solenzo =

- Location within Burkina Faso, West Africa
- Coordinates: 12°11′N 4°05′W
- Country: Burkina Faso
- Region: Boucle du Mouhoun
- Province: Banwa
- Department: Solenzo

Population (2019 census)
  - Total: 24,783
- Time zone: UTC+0 (UTC)

Solenzo is a city located in the province of Banwa in Burkina Faso. It is the capital of Banwa Province. Bénéwendé Stanislas Sankara held his campaign's first official rally before the 2015 general election in Solenzo on November 8, 2015.

The Solenzo massacre happened nearby.

Population
Year	Pop.	±%
1985	6,125	—
2006	16,850	+175.1%
2019	24,783	+47.1%
