= Bonza (video game) =

2014 video game

- Developer: Minimega
- Publisher: Minimega
- Platforms: iOS, Android
- Release: WW: March 20, 2014
- Genre: Crossword
- Mode: Single player

Bonza is a single-player crossword puzzle application developed by MiniMega, which was chosen by Apple to become part of the App Store's Best of 2014 list.

== Gameplay ==
In Bonza, players are given fragments of a crossword puzzle and tasked with fitting them back together. There are no clues for each word, rather one clue for the puzzle setting its theme.

In 2016, the developers added a feature that allows players to create their own puzzles.

== Reception ==
Bonza was chosen by Apple as part of the App Store's Best of 2014 list. Bonza was described as a "game with a strangely erratic rhythm", but received praise for its value in providing 70 puzzles for less than a dollar.
