= Truth or Dare (disambiguation) =

Truth or dare? is a party game requiring a minimum of two players.

Truth or Dare may also refer to:

== Film ==
- Truth or Dare? (1986 film), 1986 horror film by Tim Ritter
- Madonna: Truth or Dare, 1991 documentary film chronicling Madonna's Blond Ambition World Tour
- Truth or Dare: 6th Floor Rear Flat, 2003 Hong Kong film
- Truth or Dare (2012 film), a horror film by Robert Heath also known in the United States as Truth or Die
- Truth or Dare (2013 film), a horror film by Jessica Cameron
- Truth or Dare (2017 film), a horror film by Nick Simon
- Truth or Dare (2018 film), a horror film by Jeff Wadlow also known as Blumhouse's Truth or Dare

== Television ==
- Truth or Dare, 1996 drama starring Helen Baxendale
- "Truth or Dare" (Girls), a 2014 episode
- "Truth or Dare", Season 3 episode of Hi Hi Puffy AmiYumi
- "Truth or Dare" (Pan Am), a 2011 episode
- "Truth or Dare", a 2002 episode of Undeclared
- "Truth or Dare", a 2020 episode of The Walking Dead: World Beyond

== Music ==
- Truth or Dare (Automatic Loveletter album), 2010
- Truth or Dare (Oomph! album), 2010 English language compilation album by Neue Deutsche Härte band Oomph!
- "Truth or Dare", a song in Emily Osment's 2010 album Fight or Flight (Emily Osment album)
- "Dare (La La La)", a 2014 single by Shakira, originally named "Truth or Dare"
- "Truth or Dare" (Tyla song), 2023

== Literature ==
- Truth or Dare, the 28th novel in the Fear Street series by R. L. Stine
- Truth or Dare, a 2000 novel by Celia Rees

== Other uses ==
- Truth or Dare by Madonna, a perfume and accessory brand
