= MS Sama =

Several motor ships have borne the name Sama:

- MS Sama (1922) was a 567-ton cargo ship built for an Estonian company as Harjumaa in 1922, by Petrovski in Tallinn, Estonia. Sold to Panama and renamed Louis Geraci in 1927, then sold to Nicaragua in 1932 and renamed Sama. Torpedoed and sunk in the Atlantic Ocean by the German submarine U-506 on 3 May 1942.
- MS Sama (1936) was a 1,799-ton Norwegian cargo ship launched on 19 December 1936, by Lindholmens Varv in Gothenburg, Sweden. Torpedoed and sunk in the Atlantic Ocean by a German submarine on 22 February 1942.
- MS Sama (1954) was a 2,964-ton cargo ship launched as Iris on 3 June 1954, by Orenstein Koppel in Lübeck, West Germany, for a Norwegian company. Sold in 1967 to Panama and renamed Ibis. Renamed Sama in 1970. Resold in 1975 to Guatemala and renamed Tikal. Wrecked on 20 October 1975, off Puerto Plata, Dominican Republic.
- MS Sama (1967) was a 401-ton vessel launched as the trawler Daien Maru No.25 in May 1967, by Shimizu in Miho, Japan. Renamed Kotoshiro Maru No.11 in 1968. Sold in 1974 to South Korea and renamed Dong Won No.68. Renamed New Myungjin in 1975. Rebuilt as a cargo ship in 1975–1976. Renamed Dong Kyung in 1977, Sama in 1989 and Hung Kuk No.1 in 1993.
- MS Sama (1969) was a 1,028-ton tanker launched as Ludwig on 16 March 1969, by Krogerwerft in Schacht-Audorf, West Germany. Sold to Greece in 1995 and renamed Taxiarchis I, then sold to Dubai in 1997 and renamed Sama. Deleted from registers in 2011.
- MS Sama (1975) is a 191-ton Liberian-registered platform supply vessel launched as Lamnalco Tern on 6 June 1975, by Kip Plaisance in Leeville, United States. Renamed Lamnalco 15 in 1982, Khalifah in 1995, Lampis in 1996, Glory A. in 1999, Olympic Glory in 2000, Ali 1 in 2005, Morning Star in 2006 and Sama in 2009.
- MS Sama (1977) is a 2,079-ton cargo ship built as the Soviet Maldis Skreya in 1977, by a shipyard in Drobeta-Turnu Severin, Romania. Renamed Tervate in 1991, Tegesos and Sunstar in 1995, then Arktouros and Sama in 1996.
- MS Sama (2010) is a 2,531-ton cable layer completed in April 2010 for a company in the United Arab Emirates, by Cassinu in São Gonçalo, Rio de Janeiro, Brazil.
- MS Sama (2023)
