= Der =

Der or DER may refer to:

== Places ==
- Darkənd, Azerbaijan
- Dearborn (Amtrak station) (station code), in Michigan, US
- Der (Sumer), an ancient city located in modern-day Iraq
- d'Entrecasteaux Ridge, an oceanic ridge in the south-west Pacific Ocean

== Science and technology ==
- Derivative chromosome, a structurally rearranged chromosome
- Distinguished Encoding Rules, a method for encoding a data object, including public key infrastructure certificates and keys
- Distributed Energy Resources
- ∂, the partial derivative symbol
- Derivation (differential algebra) on an algebra A over a field K, the space (module) of which is denoted Der_{K}(A)
- Deep energy retrofit, an energy conservation measure

== Organizations ==
- Digital Education Revolution, former Australian Government-funded educational reform program
- DER rental (Domestic Electric Rentals Ltd), a UK television rentals company
- Documentary Educational Resources, a non-profit film producer and distributor

== Other uses ==
- Defence (Emergency) Regulations, legal regulations promulgated by the British in Mandatory Palestine in 1945
- Department of Environment Regulation, former Western Australian state government department
- Designated Engineering Representative, an individual appointed to approve, or recommend approval, of technical data to the Federal Aviation Administration
- d3r, (Real name Andreas Tarasoff) a 21-year old singer from British Columbia, Canada
