= Banwa Province =

Coordinates: 12°10′N 4°10′W

Banwa
- Province
- Location in Burkina Faso

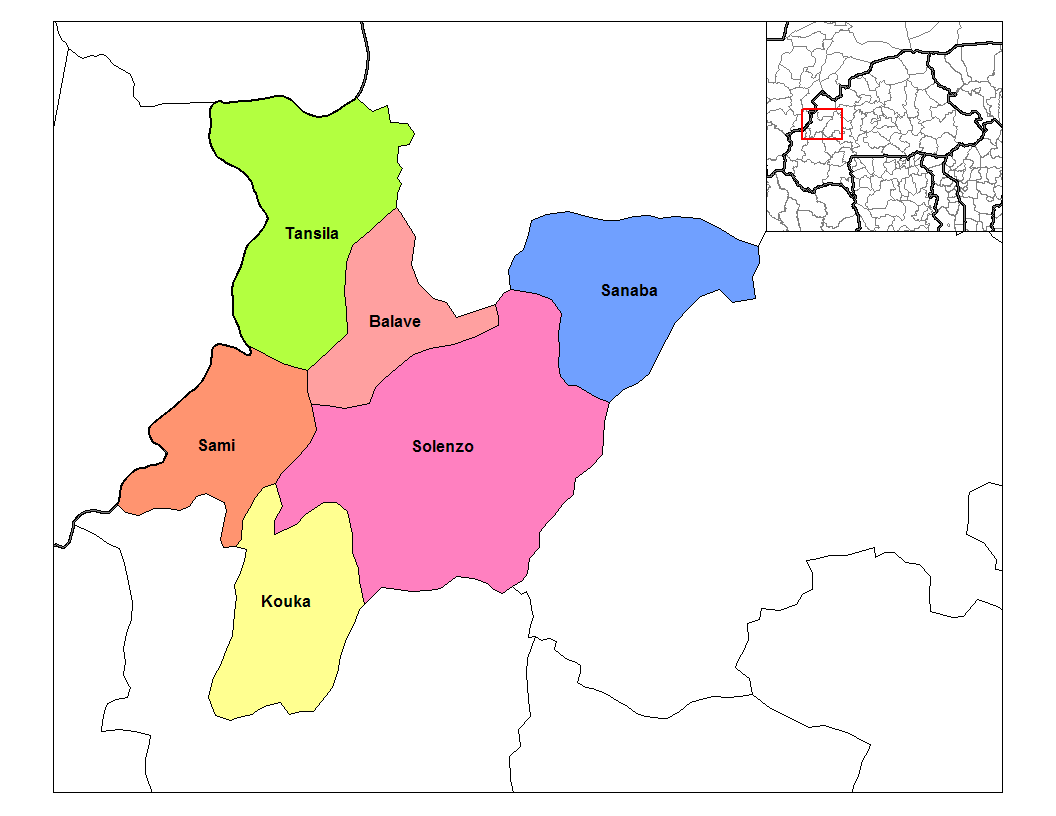
- Provincial map of its departments
- Country: Burkina Faso
- Region: Boucle du Mouhoun
- Capital: Solenzo

Area
  - Province: 5,888 km^{2} (2,273 sq mi)

Population (2019 census)
  - Province: 345,749
  - Density: 58.72/km^{2} (152.1/sq mi)
  - Urban: 24,783
- Time zone: UTC+0 (GMT 0)

Banwa is one of the 45 provinces of Burkina Faso and is in Boucle du Mouhoun Region. The capital of Banwa is Solenzo. In 2019 it had a population of 345,749.

== Education ==
In 2011 the province had 170 primary schools and 13 secondary schools.

== Healthcare ==
In 2011 the province had 23 health and social promotion centers (Centres de santé et de promotion sociale), 3 doctors and 87 nurses.

== Demographics ==
It is a rural province with 320,963 of its residents living in the countryside; only 24,786 live in urban areas. There are 169,195 men living in Banwa Province and 176,554 women.

== Departments ==
Banwa is divided into 6 departments:

The Departments of Banwa
Departments	Capitals	Population (Census 2019)
Balavé Department	Balavé	24,103
Kouka Department	Kouka	73,747
Sami Department	Sami	13,596
Sanaba Department	Sanaba	38,037
Solenzo Department	Solenzo	158,763
Tansila Department	Tansila	38,743

== See also ==
- Regions of Burkina Faso
- Provinces of Burkina Faso
- Communes of Burkina Faso
