= Bankui Region =

Region of Burkina Faso

Bankui Boucle du Mouhoun
- Region
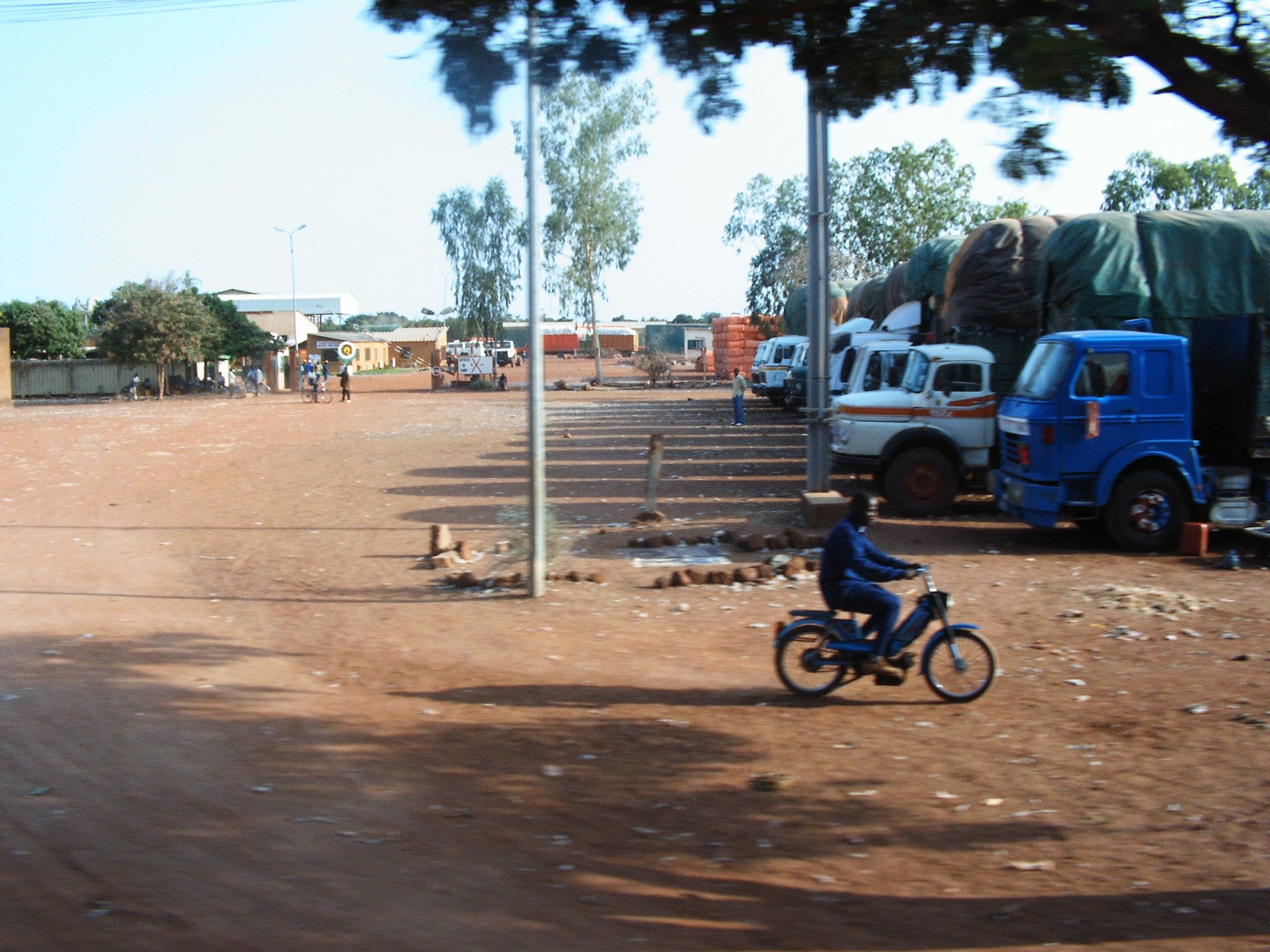
- Trucks loaded with cotton in Dédougou

- Location in Burkina Faso
- Coordinates: 12°30′N 3°30′W
- Country: Burkina Faso
- Capital: Dédougou

Government
  - Governor: Victor Dabiré

Area
  - Region: 34,162 km^{2} (13,190 sq mi)

Population (2019 census)
  - Region: 1,898,133
  - Density: 55.563/km^{2} (143.91/sq mi)
  - Urban: 183,236
- Time zone: UTC+0 (GMT 0)
- HDI (2017): 0.393 low · 9th

Bankui, formerly known as Boucle du Mouhoun ([bukl dy mu.un], "Bend of the Black Volta"), is one of Burkina Faso's 17 administrative regions. It was created on 2 July 2001 and had a population of 1,898,133 in 2019. It is the 4th most populous region in Burkina Faso and contains 9.26% of all Burkinabé. The region's capital is Dédougou. Three provinces make up the Bankui region—Balé, Banwa, Mouhoun.

As of 2019, the population of the region was 1,898,133 with 50.2% females. The population in the region was 9.26% of the total population of the country. The coverage of cereal need compared to the total production of the region was 187%. As of 2007, the literacy rate in the region was 23.2%, compared to a national average of 28.3%.

== Geography ==
Most of Burkina Faso is a wide plateau formed by riverine systems and is called falaise de Banfora. There are three major rivers, the Red Volta, Black Volta and White Volta, which cuts through different valleys. The climate is generally hot, with unreliable rains across different seasons. Gold and quartz are common minerals found across the country, while manganese deposits are also common. The dry season is usually from October to May and rains are common during the wet season from June to September. The soil texture is porous and hence the yield is also poor. The average elevation is around 200 m (660 ft) to 300 m (980 ft) above mean sea level. Among West African countries, Burkina Faso has the largest elephant population, and the country is replete with game reserves. The southern regions are more tropical in nature and have savannah and forests. The principal river is the Black Volta, that originates in the southern region and drains into Ghana. The areas near the rivers usually have flies like tsetse and similium, which are carriers of sleep sickness and river blindness. The average rainfall in the region is around 100 cm (39 in) compared to northern regions that receive only 25 cm (9.8 in) rainfall.

== Demographics ==
Historical population
Year	Pop.	±% p.a.
1985	913,713	—
1996	1,174,456	+2.31%
2006	1,442,749	+2.08%
2019	1,898,133	+2.13%

As of 2019, the population of the region was 1,898,133 with 50.2% women. The population of this region accounts for 9.26% of the total population of the country. The child mortality rate was 72, infant mortality rate was 69 and the mortality of children under five was 135. As of 2007, among the working population, there were 60.4% employees, 17.40% underemployed, 20.80% inactive people, 22.00% not working and 1.2% unemployed people in the region. The main languages spoken in Bankui as of 2006 were Moore, Bwamu, and Samo (or San). French is the official language throughout the country.

== Economy ==
As of 2007, there were 693.9 km (431.2 mi) of highways, 649.3 km (403.5 mi) of regional roads and 741.5 km (460.7 mi) of county roads. The first set of car traffic was 26, first set of two-wheeler traffic was 5,308 and the total classified road network was 2,085. The total corn produced during 2015 was 198,920 tonnes, cotton was 267,536 tonnes, cowpea was 67,212 tonnes, ground nut was 36,612 tonnes, millet was 254,707 tonnes, rice was 51,142 tonnes and sorghum was 262,942 tonnes. The coverage of cereal need compared to the total production of the region was 187.00 per cent. As of 2007, the literacy rate in the region was 23.2 per cent, compared to a national average of 28.3 per cent. The gross primary enrolment was 69 per cent, pos-primary was 21.2 per cent and gross secondary school enrolment was 6. There were 356 boys and 155 girls enrolled in the primary and post-secondary level. There were 16 teachers in primary & post-secondary level, while there were 692 teachers in post-primary and post-secondary level.

== Local administration ==
Provinces (Old)	Capital	2006
Balé Province	Boromo	213,897
Banwa Province	Solenzo	267,934
Kossi Province	Nouna	272,223
Mouhoun Province	Dédougou	298,008
Nayala Province	Toma	162,869
Sourou Province	Tougan	219,826

Burkina Faso gained independence from France in 1960. It was originally called Upper Volta. There have been military coups until 1983 when Captain Thomas Sankara took control and implemented radical left-wing policies. He was ousted by Blaise Compaore, who continued for 27 years until 2014, when a popular uprising ended his rule. As per Law No.40/98/AN in 1998, Burkina Faso adhered to decentralization to provide administrative and financial autonomy to local communities. There are 13 administrative regions, each governed by a Governor. The regions are subdivided into 45 provinces, which are further subdivided into 351 communes. The communes may be urban or rural and are interchangeable. There are other administrative entities like department and village. An urban commune has typically 10,000 people under it. If any commune is not able to get 75 per cent of its planned budget in revenues for 3 years, the autonomy is taken off. The communes are administered by elected Mayors. The communes are stipulated to develop economic, social and cultural values of its citizens. A commune has financial autonomy and can interact with other communes, government agencies or international entities.
