= Kera =

Kera or KERA may refer to:

== Places ==
- Kera, Kutch, a village in Bhuj Taluka of Kutch district of Gujarat, India
- Kera Swaminarayan Mandir
- Kera, Kōchi Prefecture, Japan
- Kéra, Bondokuy, a village in the Bondokuy department of Burkina Faso
- Kera (Yaba, Burkina Faso), a village in the Yaba Department of Burkina Faso
- Kera railway station, a railway station and neighborhood in Espoo, Finland
- Kéra a sub-prefecture of Mayo-Kebbi Est Region in Chad

- Kera, name variant of Keira, Kira, Keera

== Other ==
- KERA (FM), a radio station (90.1 FM) licensed to Dallas, Texas
- KERA-TV, a television station (virtual channel 13/RF channel 14) licensed to Dallas, Texas
- Kentucky Education Reform Act
- Kentucky Equal Rights Association
- Kera language, a language spoken in southwest Chad and north Cameroon
- Kera, Yaba
- Keratocan, a human protein in the cornea
- Tiiu Kera (born 1945), United States Air Force major general
- Kera, a cloth belt which is used to tie the gho, the national dress for men in Bhutan

== See also ==
- Kira (disambiguation)
- Keira (disambiguation)
- Kiera
- Kaira (disambiguation)
