= Metals of antiquity =

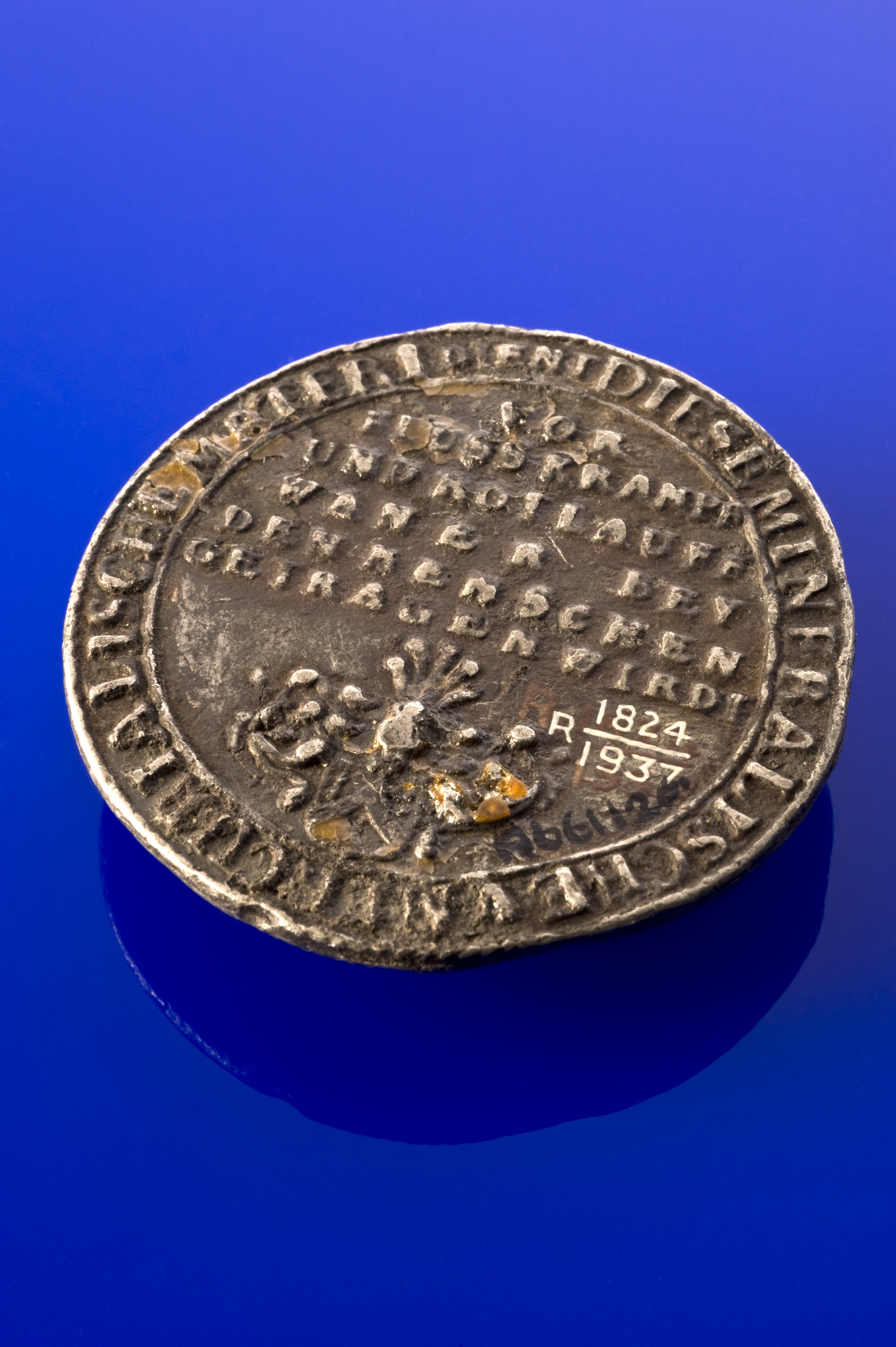
German amulet to protect against disease (18th century); it is made from an alloy of the seven alchemical metals: lead, tin, iron, gold, copper, mercury and silver.

Metal production in the ancient Middle East

The metals of antiquity are the seven metals which humans had identified and found use for in prehistoric times in Africa, Europe and throughout Asia: gold, silver, copper, tin, lead, iron, and mercury.

Zinc, arsenic, and antimony were also known during antiquity, but they were not recognised as distinct metals until later. A special case is platinum; it was known to native South Americans around the time Europe was going through classical antiquity, but was unknown to Europeans until the 18th century. Thus, at most eleven elemental metals and metalloids were known by the end of antiquity; this contrasts greatly with the situation today, with over 90 elemental metals known. Bismuth only began to be recognised as distinct around 1500 by the European and Incan civilisations. The first elemental metal with a clearly identifiable discoverer is cobalt, discovered in 1735 by Georg Brandt, by which time the Scientific Revolution was in full swing. (Even then, cobalt might have been prepared before the 13th century by alchemists roasting and reducing its ore, but, in any case, its distinct nature was not recognised.)

== History ==
Copper was probably the first metal mined and crafted by humans. It was originally obtained as a native metal and later from the smelting of ores. Earliest estimates of the discovery of copper suggest around 9000 BC in the Middle East. It was one of the most important materials to humans throughout the Chalcolithic and Bronze Ages. Copper beads dating from 6000 BC have been found in Çatalhöyük, Anatolia, and the archaeological site of Belovode on the Rudnik mountain in Serbia contains the world's oldest securely dated evidence of copper smelting from 5000 BC.

It is believed that lead smelting began at least 9,000 years ago, and the oldest known artifact of lead is a statuette found at the temple of Osiris on the site of Abydos dated around 3800 BC.

The earliest gold artifacts were discovered at the site of Wadi Qana in the Levant. Silver is estimated to have been discovered in Asia Minor shortly after copper and gold.

There is evidence that iron was known from before 5000 BC. The oldest known iron objects used by humans are some beads of meteoric iron, made in Egypt in about 4000 BC. The discovery of smelting around 3000 BC led to the start of the Iron Age around 1200 BC and the prominent use of iron for tools and weapons.

Tin was first smelted in combination with copper around 3500 BC to produce bronze - and thus giving place to the Bronze Age (except in some places which did not experience a significant Bronze Age, passing directly from the Neolithic Stone Age to the Iron Age). Kestel, in southern Turkey, is the site of an ancient Cassiterite mine that was used from 3250 to 1800 BC. The oldest artifacts date from around 2000 BC.

The metals of antiquity were recognised as distinct elements in Méthode de nomenclature chimique (Method of Chemical Nomenclature), written by a group consisting of Louis Guyton de Morveau, Antoine Lavoisier, Claude Berthollet, and Antoine-François de Fourcroy in 1787.

== Characteristics ==
=== Melting point ===
The metals of antiquity generally have low melting points, with iron being the exception.

- Mercury melts at −38.829 °C (−37.89 °F) (being liquid at room temperature).
- Tin melts at 231 °C (449 °F)
- Lead melts at 327 °C (621 °F)
- Silver at 961 °C (1763 °F)
- Gold at 1064 °C (1947 °F)
- Copper at 1084 °C (1984 °F)
- Iron is the outlier at 1538 °C (2800 °F), making it far more difficult to melt in antiquity. Cultures developed ironworking proficiency at different rates; however, evidence from the Near East suggests that smelting was possible but impractical circa 1500 BC, and relatively commonplace across most of Eurasia by 500 BC. However, until this period, generally known as the Iron Age, ironwork would have been impossible.

The other metals discovered before the Scientific Revolution largely fit the pattern, except for high-melting platinum:

- Bismuth melts at 272 °C (521 °F)
- Zinc melts at 420 °C (787 °F), but importantly boils at 907 °C (1665 °F), a temperature below the melting point of silver. Consequently, at the temperatures needed to reduce zinc oxide to the metal, the metal is already gaseous.
- Arsenic sublimes at 615 °C (1137 °F), passing directly from the solid state to the gaseous state.
- Antimony melts at 631 °C (1167 °F)
- Platinum melts at 1768 °C (3215 °F), even higher than iron. Native South Americans worked with it instead by sintering: they combined gold and platinum powders, until the alloy became soft enough to shape with tools.

=== Extraction ===
While all the metals of antiquity but lead occur natively, only gold and silver are commonly found as the native metal.

- Gold and silver occur frequently in their native form
- Mercury compounds are reduced to elemental mercury simply by low-temperature heating (500 °C).
- Tin and iron occur as oxides and can be reduced with carbon monoxide (produced by, for example, burning charcoal) at 900 °C.
- Copper and lead compounds can be roasted to produce the oxides, which are then reduced with carbon monoxide at 900 °C.
- Meteoric iron is often found as the native metal and it was the earliest source for iron objects known to humanity

== Symbolism ==
The practice of alchemy in the Western world, based on a Hellenistic and Babylonian approach to planetary astronomy, often ascribed a symbolic association between the seven then-known celestial bodies and the metals known to the Greeks and Babylonians during antiquity. Additionally, some alchemists and astrologers believed there was an association, sometimes called a rulership, between days of the week, the alchemical metals, and the planets that were said to hold "dominion" over them. There was some early variation, but the most common associations since antiquity are the following:

Metal	Body	Symbol	Day of week
Gold	Sun	☉︎	Sunday
Silver	Moon	☾	Monday
Iron	Mars	♂	Tuesday
Mercury	Mercury	☿	Wednesday
Tin	Jupiter	♃	Thursday
Copper	Venus	♀	Friday
Lead	Saturn	♄	Saturday

Each metal was associated with their respective celestial bodies based on their physical properties:

- Gold was associated with the Sun due to its bright, yellowish radiance.
- Silver was associated with the Moon due to its whitish, reflective, luminous luster.
- Iron was associated with Mars, the Roman god of war, for its heavy use in early weapons manufacturing.
- Mercury was associated with Mercury, the Roman god of the trade, due to the god's continuous movement, much like mercury metal due to its liquid state of matter.
- Tin was associated with Jupiter, the Roman god of the sky and lightning. Jupiter was also considered the chief deity and protector of Rome. Therefore, tin became associated with Jupiter due to the metals' innate resistance to rusting, making it be useful in protecting food, much like how Jupiter was thought to protect Rome.
- Copper was associated with Venus, the Roman goddess of beauty, due to the metal's extensive use in cosmetic creations, such as mirrors.
- Lead was associated with Saturn, the Roman equivalent to the Greek Titan Cronus, due to lead being the heaviest and densest metal out of the seven metals.

== See also ==
- Timeline of chemical element discoveries
- Ashtadhatu, the eight metals of Hindu alchemy (these seven plus zinc)
- History of metallurgy in the Indian subcontinent
- History of metallurgy in China
- Metallurgy in pre-Columbian America
- Copper metallurgy in Africa
- Iron metallurgy in Africa
