= Yankasso =

- Village
- Location within Burkina Faso
- Coordinates: 12.208307°N 3.200519°W
- Country: Burkina Faso
- Region: Boucle du Mouhoun
- Province: Mouhoun
- Department: Safané
- Time zone: UTC+0 (GMT)

Yankasso is a village in the Safané Department of Mouhoun province of Burkina Faso. It was the site of a serious defeat of the French colonial forces in December 1915.

== Location ==
Yankasso is just north of Safané and 46 kilometres (29 mi) southeast of Dédougou. As of the 1996 census, the population of Yankasso was 2,012.

== Battle of 23 December 1915 ==
In November 1915 there was a revolt in the Black Volta bend against the French. The administrator Jules Brévié arrived at the end of the month to review the situation. On 21 December 1915 a French column left Dédougou led by commandant Simonin. Yankasso was then a large Marka village on the route leading south to Bouna. Simonin suffered a serious check at Yankasso on 23 December. Brévié was present at the battle. The defeat was a political disaster for the colonial forces, since it showed they were not invincible. Within a few days the revolt had spread to the whole of the Volta bend. On 2 March 1916 the French returned and destroyed the village. Most of Burkina Faso was at peace by the end of July 1916.

== Sources ==
- Benoist, Joseph-Roger de (1987). Église et pouvoir colonial au Soudan français: les relations entre les administrateurs et les missionnaires catholiques dans la Boucle du Niger, de 1885 à 1945. KARTHALA Editions. ISBN 978-2-86537-169-3.
- Kamian, Bakari (2001). Des tranchées de Verdun à l'église Saint-Bernard: 80000 combattants maliens au secours de la France, 1914-18 et 1939-45. KARTHALA Editions. ISBN 978-2-84586-138-1.
- "Liste des villages de la région de la Boucle du Mouhoun". Projet Inforoute des Collectivités Territoriales du Burkina Faso. Archived from the original on 2008-01-25.
- Rupley, Lawrence; Bangali, Lamissa; Diamitani, Boureima (2013). Historical Dictionary of Burkina Faso. Rowman & Littlefield. ISBN 978-0-8108-6770-3.
