= Bona (Safané) =

Coordinates: 12.0184°N 3.2507°W

Bona is a village in Safané Department, Mouhoun Province, Burkina Faso.

Bona has a population of 1,143.

== See also ==
- Bona (Lena), Burkina Faso
