= Dédougou Department =

Coordinates: 12°27′N 3°28′W

Dédougou
- Department
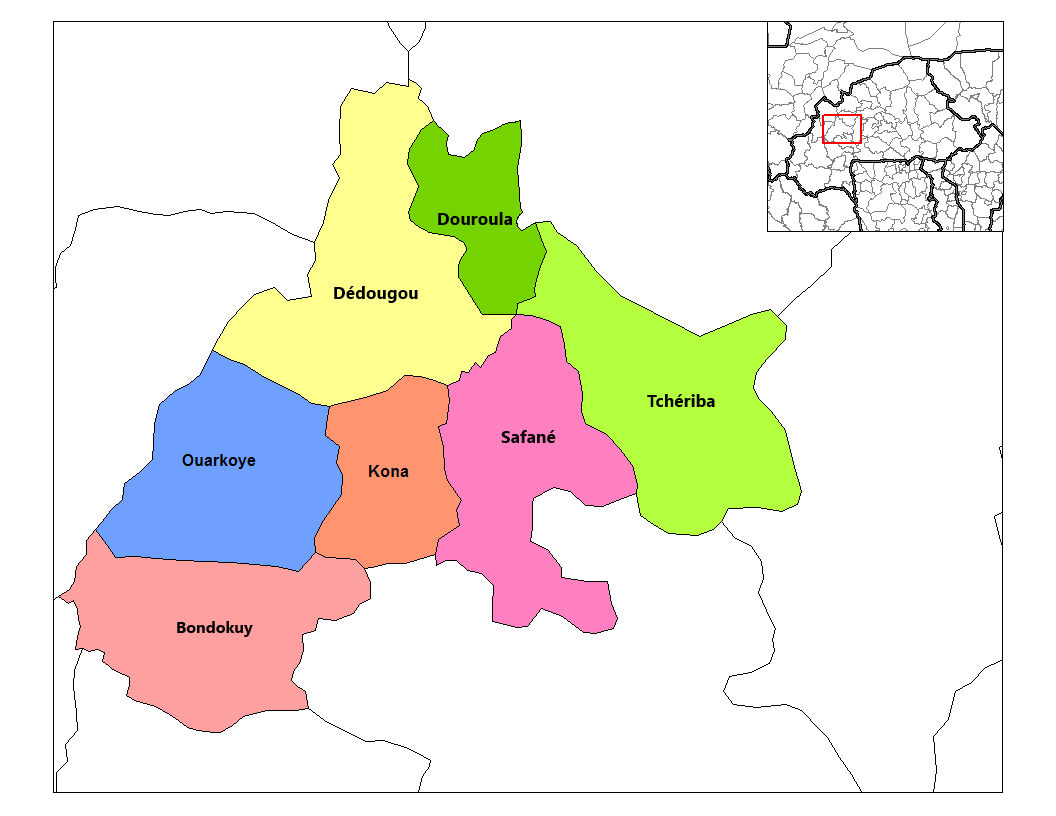
- Dédougou Department location in the province
- Country: Burkina Faso
- Province: Mouhoun Province

Area
  - Department: 523 sq mi (1,354 km^{2})

Population (2019 census)
  - Department: 123,934
  - Density: 237.1/sq mi (91.53/km^{2})
  - Urban: 63,617
- Time zone: UTC+0 (GMT 0)

Dédougou is a department or commune of Mouhoun Province in western Burkina Faso. Its capital is the town of Dédougou. According to the 2019 census the department has a total population of 123,934.

== Towns and villages ==
- Dédougou (63,617 inhabitants) (capital)
- Bana (319 inhabitants)
- Bokuy (729 inhabitants)
- Boron (624 inhabitants)
- Dankuy (369 inhabitants)
- Debe (259 inhabitants)
- Fakouna (3,647 inhabitants)
- Haperekuy (97 inhabitants)
- Kamandena (1,171 inhabitants)
- Kari (1,568 inhabitants)
- Karo (3,266 inhabitants)
- Koran (801 inhabitants)
- Kore (1,658 inhabitants)
- Koukatenga (1,556 inhabitants)
- Kouna (131 inhabitants)
- Konandia (1,337 inhabitants)
- Lonkakuy (489 inhabitants)
- Magnimasso (1,192 inhabitants)
- Makuy (215 inhabitants)
- Massala (1,839 inhabitants)
- Naokuy (960 inhabitants)
- Oulani (2,997 inhabitants)
- Parade (1,289 inhabitants)
- Passakongo (2,894 inhabitants)
- Sagala (452 inhabitants)
- Soakuy (173 inhabitants)
- Sokoura (1,409 inhabitants)
- Soukuy (864 inhabitants)
- Souri, Burkina Faso (3,571 inhabitants)
- Tare (276 inhabitants)
- Tiankuy (443 inhabitants)
- Toroba (3,705 inhabitants)
- Wetina (465 inhabitants)
- Worokuy (853 inhabitants)
- Yonkuy (598 inhabitants)
- Zakuy (231 inhabitants)
- Zeoula (449 inhabitants)
- Zeoule (298 inhabitants)
