= Poundou =

- Location within Burkina Faso
- Coordinates: 12°11′N 3°34′W
- Country: Burkina Faso
- Region: Boucle du Mouhoun Region
- Province: Mouhoun Province
- Department: Ouarkoye Department

Population (2018)
  - Total: 3,499
- Time zone: UTC+0 (GMT)

Poundou is a town in the Ouarkoye Department of Mouhoun Province in southern Burkina Faso. The town has a total population of 3,499.

== Twin towns – sister cities ==
Poundou is twinned with:

- Flers, France
