= Ouarkoye Department =

Coordinates: 12.0833°N 3.6667°W

Ouarkoye
- Department
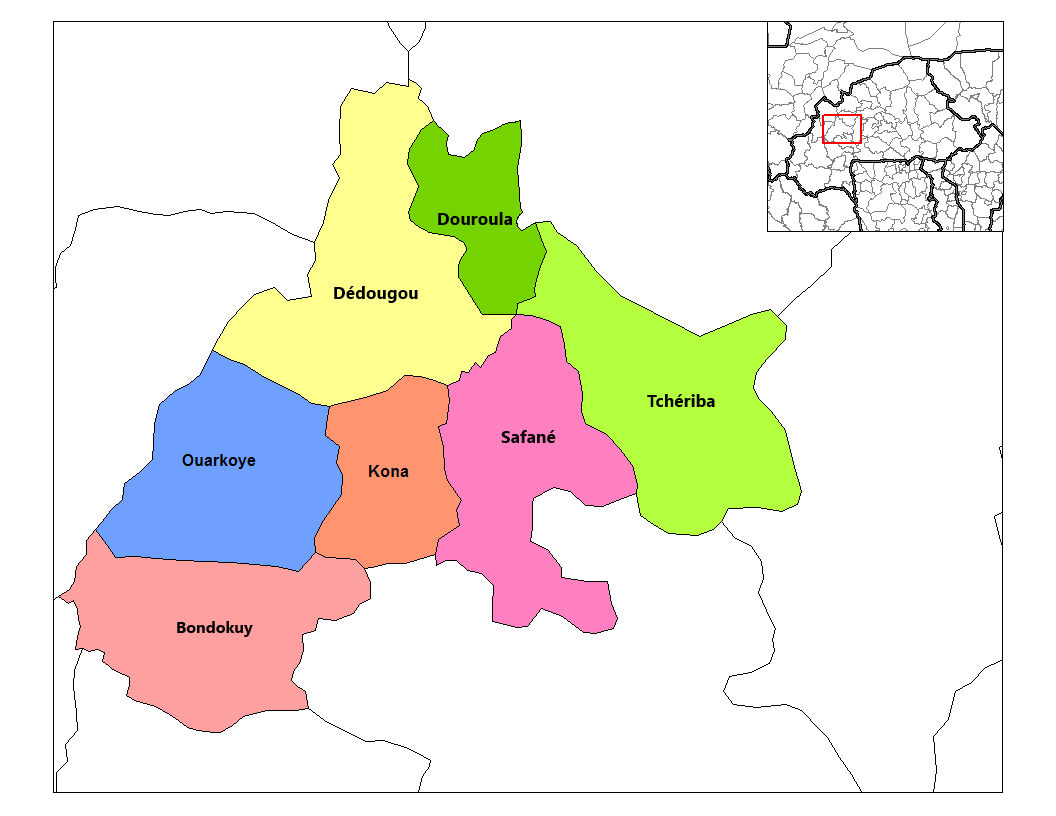
- Ouarkoye Department location in the province
- Country: Burkina Faso
- Province: Mouhoun Province

Population (1996)
  - Total: 37,178
- Time zone: UTC+0 (GMT 0)

Ouarkoye is a department or commune of Mouhoun Province in western Burkina Faso. Its capital lies at the town of Ouarkoye. According to the 1996 census the department has a total population of 37,178.

== Towns and villages ==
- Ouarkoye (3 916 inhabitants) (capital)
- Bekuy (687 inhabitants)
- Dankuy (1 731 inhabitants)
- Darou (492 inhabitants)
- Doudou (3 241 inhabitants)
- Dakena (4 426 inhabitants)
- Fouankuy (878 inhabitants)
- Kamako (138 inhabitants)
- Kekaba (1 712 inhabitants)
- Koena (1 844 inhabitants)
- Kosso (4 348 inhabitants)
- Kouankuy (1 507 inhabitants)
- Lokinde (360 inhabitants)
- Miana (471 inhabitants)
- Monkuy (2 982 inhabitants)
- Ouanabekuy (620 inhabitants)
- Oue (219 inhabitants)
- Perakuy (313 inhabitants)
- Poundou (3 499 inhabitants)
- Samakuy (361 inhabitants)
- Soana (330 inhabitants)
- Sokongo (1 280 inhabitants)
- Syn n°1 (253 inhabitants)
- Tiokuy (1 570 inhabitants)
