= Léna Department =

Coordinates: 11.3000°N 3.9000°W

Lena
- Department
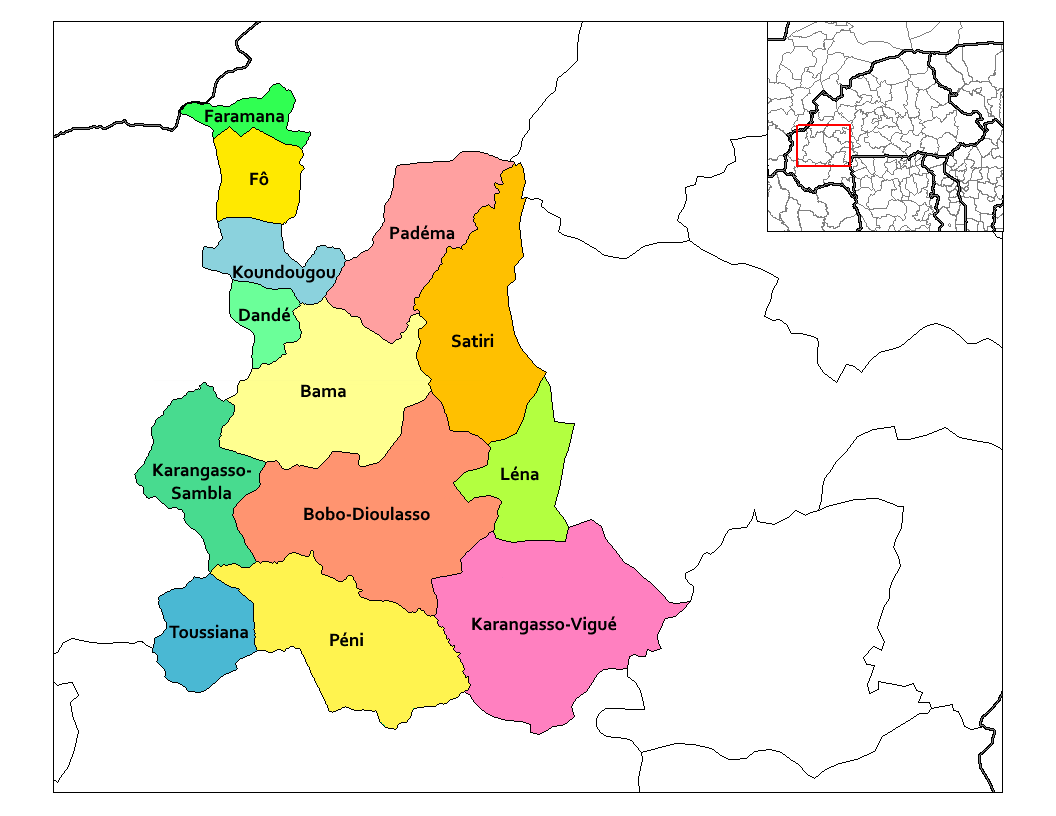
- Lena Department location in the province
- Country: Burkina Faso
- Province: Houet Province
- Time zone: UTC+0 (GMT 0)

Lena is a department or commune of Houet Province in south-western Burkina Faso. Its capital lies in the town of Lena.

== Towns and villages ==
- Bona
