= Safané Department =

Coordinates: 12°08′N 3°13′W

Safané
- Department
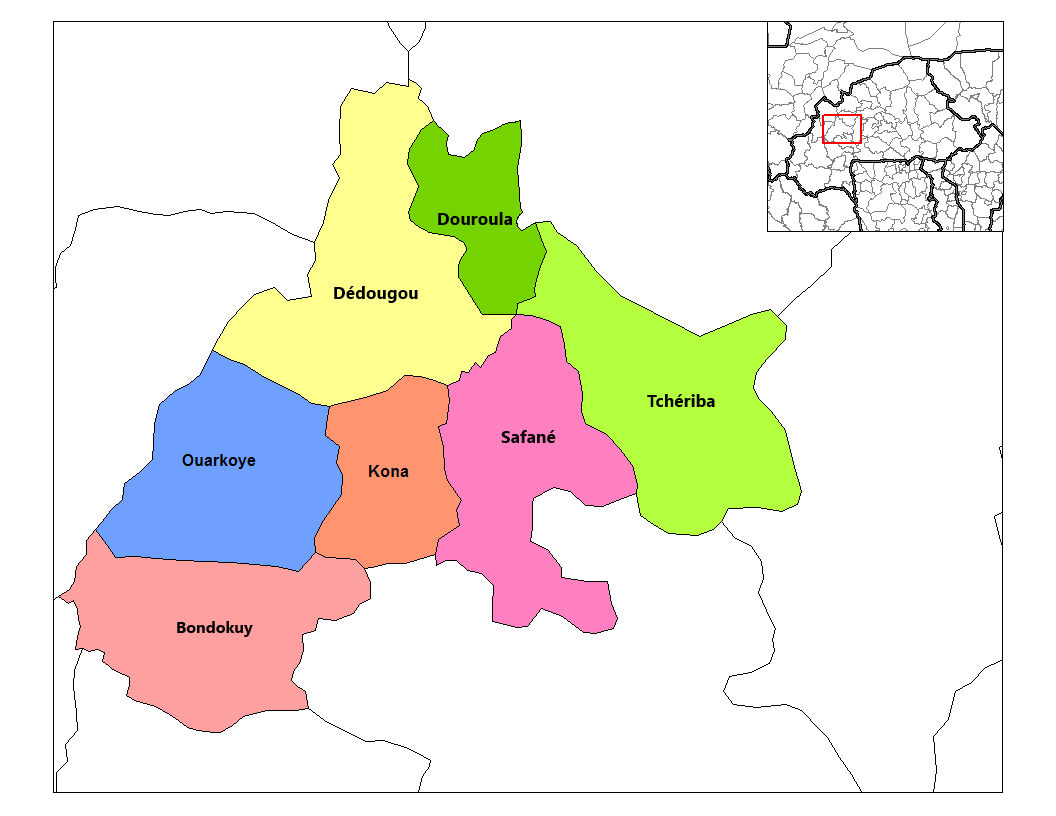
- Safané Department location in the province
- Country: Burkina Faso
- Province: Mouhoun Province

Area
  - Total: 379.6 sq mi (983.1 km^{2})

Population (2019 census)
  - Total: 62,048
  - Density: 163.5/sq mi (63.11/km^{2})
- Time zone: UTC+0 (GMT 0)

Safané is a department or commune of Mouhoun Province in western Burkina Faso. Its capital lies at the town of Safané. According to the 1996 census the department has a total population of 44,925.

== Towns and villages ==
- Safané (7 502 inhabitants) (capital)
- Banga (374 inhabitants)
- Banou (1 184 inhabitants)
- Bara (1 402 inhabitants)
- Bara-Yankasso (946 inhabitants)
- Biforo (1 768 inhabitants)
- Bilakongo (691 inhabitants)
- Bomboila (1 264 inhabitants)
- Bominasso (340 inhabitants)
- Bona (1 143 inhabitants)
- Bossien (667 inhabitants)
- Datomo (4 141 inhabitants)
- Doumakélé (304 inhabitants)
- Guizigoron (104 inhabitants)
- Kienséré (972 inhabitants)
- Kira (705 inhabitants)
- Kokoun (1 209 inhabitants)
- Kongoba (1 247 inhabitants)
- Kongosso (354 inhabitants)
- Kongodiana (401 inhabitants)
- lanfièra (1 109 inhabitants)
- Makongo (1 642 inhabitants)
- missakongo (281 inhabitants)
- Nounou (1 968 inhabitants)
- Pakolé (405 inhabitants)
- Pakoro (170 inhabitants)
- Sikorosso (15 inhabitants)
- Sirakorosso (190 inhabitants)
- Siralo (1 234 inhabitants)
- Sin (1 191 inhabitants)
- Sodien (1 269 inhabitants)
- Sokoula (600 inhabitants)
- Sokoulani (658 inhabitants)
- Tiekuy (937 inhabitants)
- Tounou (1 066 inhabitants)
- Tuena (735 inhabitants)
- Yamou (627 inhabitants)
- Yankasso (2 012 inhabitants)
- Ziasso (899 inhabitants)
- Zienkuy (1 199 inhabitants)
