= Tchériba Department =

Coordinates: 12°16′N 3°05′W

Tchériba
- Department
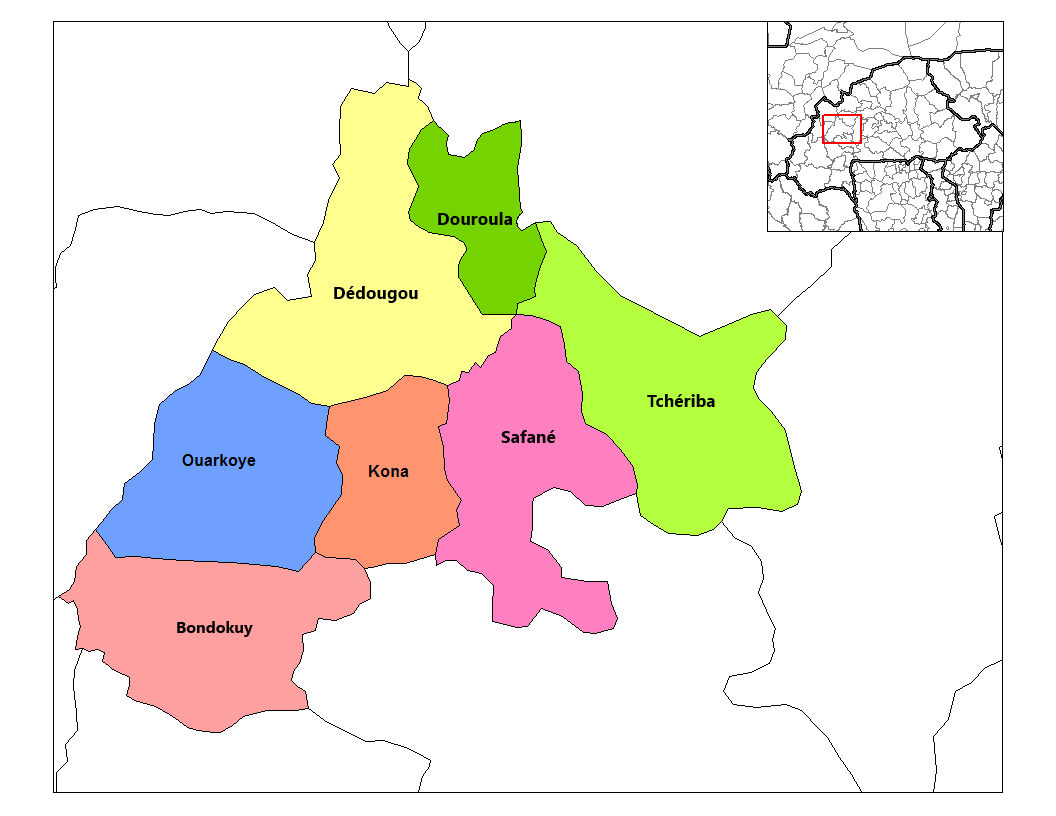
- Tchériba Department location in the province
- Country: Burkina Faso
- Province: Mouhoun Province

Area
  - Total: 505 sq mi (1,309 km^{2})

Population (2019 census)
  - Total: 53,128
  - Density: 105.1/sq mi (40.59/km^{2})
- Time zone: UTC+0 (GMT 0)

Tchériba is a department or commune of Mouhoun Province in western Burkina Faso. Its capital lies at the town of Tchériba. According to the 2019 census the department has a total population of 53,128.

== Towns and villages ==
- Tchériba (5 610 inhabitants) (capital)
- Bankorosso (256 inhabitants)
- Banouba (521 inhabitants)
- Bekeyou (1 436 inhabitants)
- Beneyou (170 inhabitants)
- Bissanderou (1 903 inhabitants)
- Da (282 inhabitants)
- Didie (441 inhabitants)
- Djissasso (1 196 inhabitants)
- Douroukou (1 360 inhabitants)
- Etouayou (573 inhabitants)
- Gamadougou (732 inhabitants)
- Kana (106 inhabitants)
- Kari (836 inhabitants)
- Labien (1 560 inhabitants)
- Lan (1 135 inhabitants)
- Nerekorosso (1 058 inhabitants)
- Oualou (1 959 inhabitants)
- Oualoubié (349 inhabitants)
- Oula (1 088 inhabitants)
- Ouezala (796 inhabitants)
- Sao (1 991 inhabitants)
- Sirakélé (775 inhabitants)
- Tierkou (2 047 inhabitants)
- Tikan (2 880 inhabitants)
- Tissé (2 022 inhabitants)
- Youlou (1 224 inhabitants)
- Zehuy (2 512 inhabitants)
