= FESTIMA =

Festival celebrating traditional African masks

International Festival of Masks and the Arts Festival International des Masques et des Arts
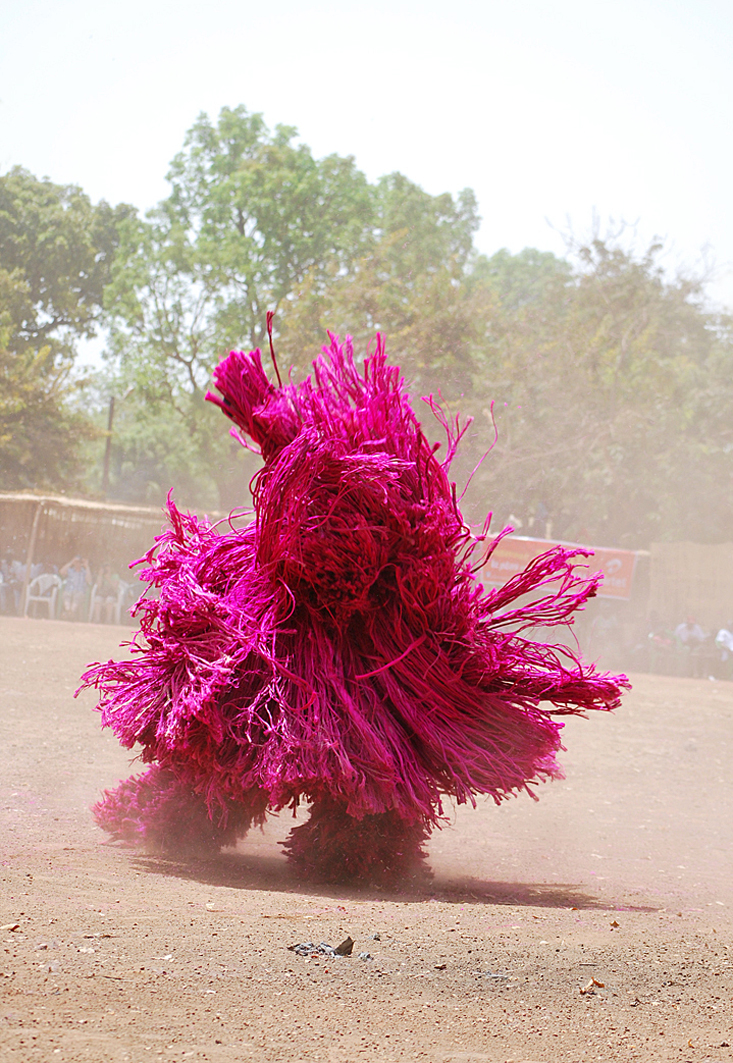
- A masked dancer performing at the 2014 festival
- Status: Active
- Genre: Cultural festival
- Frequency: Biennial
- Location: Dédougou
- Country: Burkina Faso
- Inaugurated: 1996
- Founder: Association for the Protection of Masks (ASAMA)
- Previous event: 2020
- Next event: 2022

The Festival International des Masques et des Arts (International Festival of Masks and the Arts), or FESTIMA, is a cultural festival celebrating traditional African masks held in Dédougou, Burkina Faso. Founded to help preserve traditional cultural practices in the modern age, FESTIMA features masks and traditions from several West African countries. It is currently held biennially in even-numbered years. The most recent edition, the fifteenth, was held from February 29 to March 7, 2020, in Bankuy.

== History ==
In 1996, a group of Burkinabé students founded ASAMA, the Association for the Protection of Masks, in order to promote and preserve traditional mask practices. One of the concerns is that traditional masks are no longer a regular part of life for many. The masks' origins are religious in nature, historically being associated with animism. Animism and other traditional beliefs are minority religions in modern Burkina Faso, with estimates indicating they are practiced by between 7.8 and 15 percent of the population. The majority religion in the country is Islam, which does not use the masks in their ceremonies. However, members of ASAMA believe that traditional masks can still be important culturally even to those for whom they are not important religiously. According to Ki Leonce, executive director of ASAMA, "There are two aspects about masks. One is cult and the other is culture; there might be a religious conflict for people who venerate masks, but there is no conflict from the cultural point."

The original FESTIMA, held in 1996, was four days long, and the event has since expanded to seven days. The thirteenth edition of the festival was held from February 27 to March 5, 2016, and featured masks from over 50 communities from six West African countries: Burkina Faso, Benin, Ivory Coast, Mali, Senegal, and Togo. ASAMA estimated 100,000 people attended the event, including more than 2,000 international tourists.

The fourteenth edition was held from February 24 to March 3, 2018.

== Events ==
The primary events of FESTIMA are the performances, where mask wearers dance, accompanied by musicians playing hand drums, whistles, and balafons. Sometimes, a translator is present to interpret the meaning of the dance. Some of the ethnic groups whose traditions are represented are the Bwaba, Marka, and Yoruba.

FESTIMA also includes seminars on historical and cultural topics, storytelling competitions, educational events for children, and a marketplace.
