= Bondokuy =

- Location in Burkina Faso
- Coordinates: 11°51′10″N 3°45′42″W
- Country: Burkina Faso
- Region: Boucle du Mouhoun
- Province: Mouhoun Province
- Department: Bondokuy Department

Population (2006)
  - Total: 3,982
- Time zone: UTC+0 (GMT 0)

Bondokuy is the capital of Bondokuy Department, Burkina Faso. It has 3,982 inhabitants.

== History ==
Louis-Gustave Binger arrived here in May 1888. Binger estimated the population as 2,500 to 3,000 inhabitants.

== Notable people ==
- Ibrahim Traoré Interim President of Burkina Faso
