= Bona (Lena) =

Coordinates: 11°10′N 4°00′W

Bona is a village in Lena Department, Houet Province, Burkina Faso.

Bona has a population of 690.

== See also ==
- Bona (Safané), Burkina Faso
