= Ouarkoye =

- Location within Burkina Faso, West Africa
- Coordinates: 12°05′N 3°40′W
- Country: Burkina Faso
- RegionDepartment: Boucle du Mouhoun
- Province: Mouhoun Province
- Department: Ouarkoye Department

Population
  - Total: 3,916
- Time zone: UTC+0 (GMT)

Ouarkoye is a town approximately 200 kilometres (120 mi) west of Ouagadougou, Burkina Faso. It is the capital of Ouarkoye Department in Mouhoun Province. The town has a population of 3,916. Brig. General Yaoua Michel Tamini was from this village.

It is also rarely spelled Ouarkaye. Several other towns in Burkina Faso have similar names: Ouargaye, Ouarokuy and Ouarakuy.
