= Kona Department =

Coordinates: 12°04′N 3°26′W

Kona
- Department
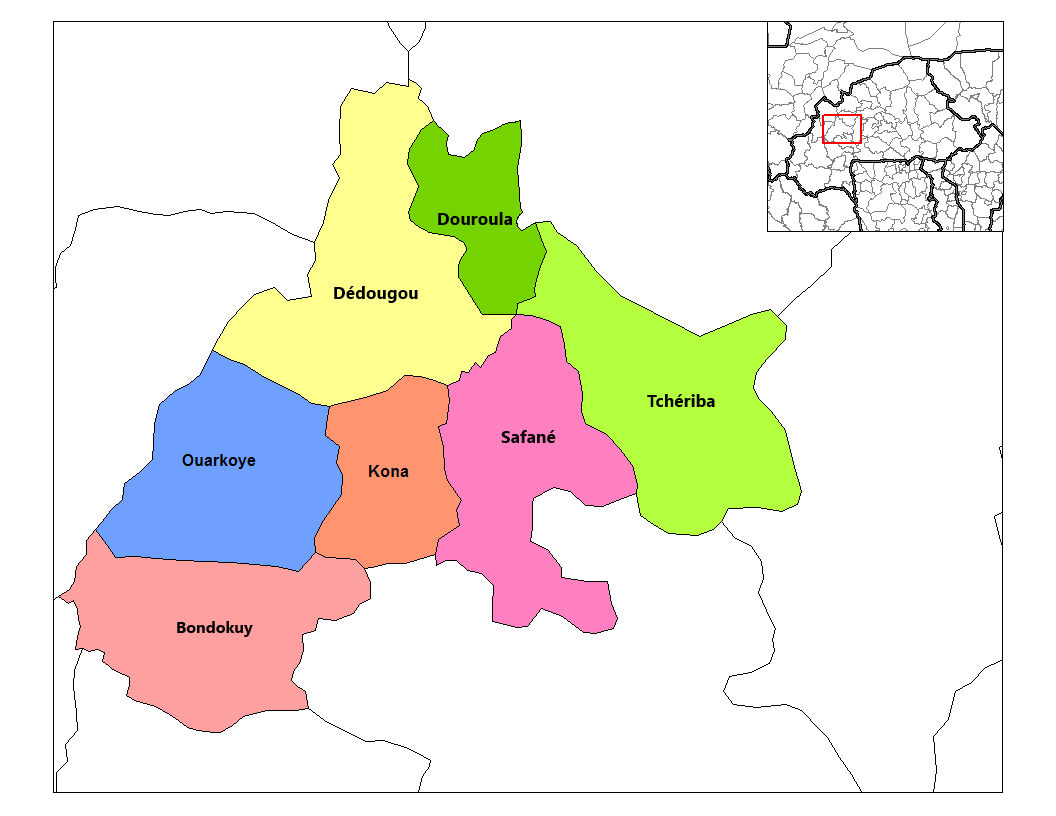
- Kona Department location in the province
- Country: Burkina Faso
- Province: Mouhoun Province

Population (1996)
  - Total: 18,033
- Time zone: UTC+0 (GMT 0)

Kona is a department or commune of Mouhoun Province in western Burkina Faso. Its capital is Kona. According to the 1996 census the department had a population of 18,033.

== Towns and villages ==
- Kona (2 704 inhabitants) (capital)
- Blé (767 inhabitants)
- Dafina (1 590 inhabitants)
- Dangouna (1 158 inhabitants)
- Goulo (458 inhabitants)
- Kouana (1 488 inhabitants)
- Lah (3 239 inhabitants)
- Nana (1 057 inhabitants)
- Pie (1 690 inhabitants)
- Sanfle (564 inhabitants)
- Soungoule (320 inhabitants)
- Tâ (650 inhabitants)
- Tena (422 inhabitants)
- Tona (1 005 inhabitants)
- Yankoro (115 inhabitants)
- Yoana (568 inhabitants)
- Zina (238 inhabitants)
