= Douroula Department =

Coordinates: 12°35′00″N 3°18′00″W

Douroula
- Department
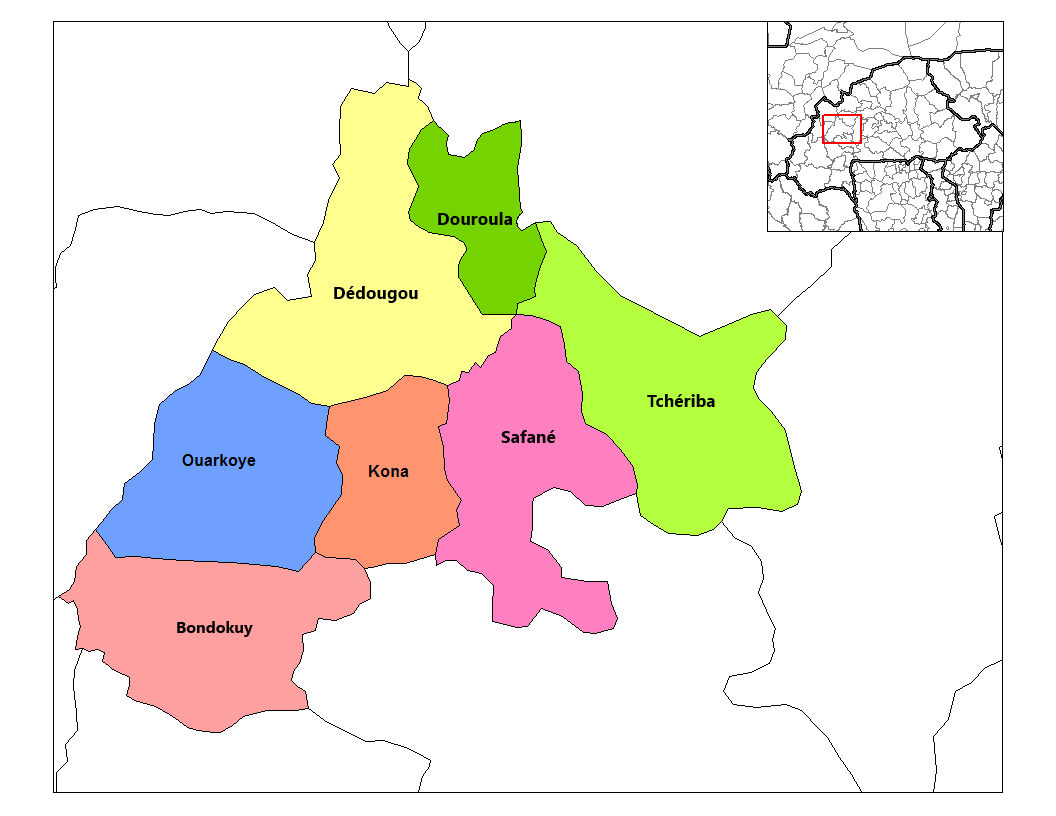
- Douroula Department location in the province
- Country: Burkina Faso
- Province: Mouhoun Province

Area
  - Total: 183.9 sq mi (476.4 km^{2})

Population (2019 census)
  - Total: 18,418
  - Density: 100.1/sq mi (38.66/km^{2})
- Time zone: UTC+0 (GMT 0)

Douroula is a department or commune of Mouhoun Province in western Burkina Faso. Its capital is Douroula. According to the 2019 census, the department has a total population of 18,418.

== Towns and villages ==
- Douroula (3 471 inhabitants) (capital)
- Bladi (2,196 inhabitants)
- Kankono (698 inhabitants)
- Kassakongo (550 inhabitants)
- Kerebe (1,000 inhabitants)
- Kirikongo (1,188 inhabitants)
- Koussiri (374 inhabitants)
- Noraotenga (750 inhabitants)
- Sa (340 inhabitants)
- Souma (655 inhabitants)
- Tora (520 inhabitants)
- Toroba (977 inhabitants)
