= Kéra, Bondokuy =

Village in Bondokuy Department, Burkina Faso

Kéra
- Location in Burkina Faso
- Coordinates: 11°57′48″N 3°42′29″W
- Country: Burkina Faso
- Region: Boucle du Mouhoun
- Province: Mouhoun Province
- Department: Bondokuy Department

Population (2019)
  - Total: 2,783

Kéra is a village in the Bondokuy Department of Mouhoun Province in Burkina Faso.

== Demographics ==
Population
Year	Pop.	±%
1985	1,431	—
2006	1,991	+39.1%
2019	2,783	+39.8%

== People ==
Kéra is the hometown of Ibrahim Traoré.
