= Bondokuy Department =

Coordinates: 11°55′08″N 3°43′33″W

Bondokuy
- Department
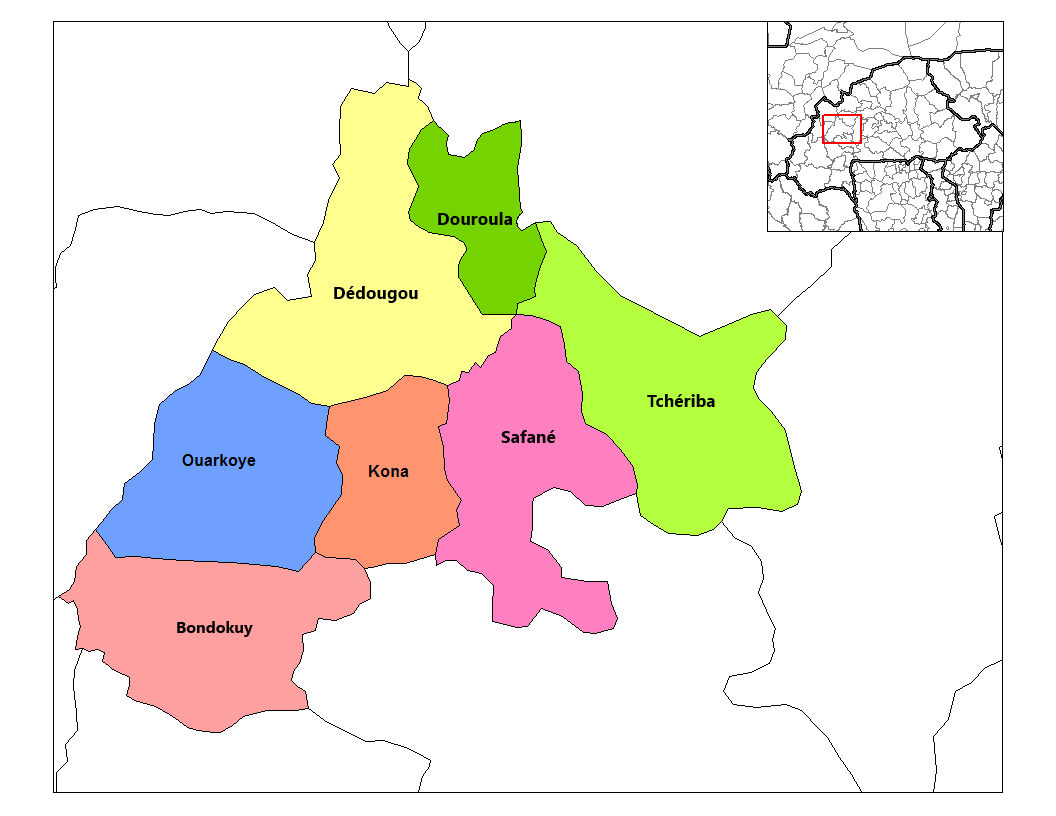
- Bondokuy Department location in the province
- Country: Burkina Faso
- Province: Mouhoun Province

Area
  - Total: 415 sq mi (1,074 km^{2})

Population (2019)
  - Total: 62,214
  - Density: 150.0/sq mi (57.93/km^{2})
- Time zone: UTC+0 (GMT 0)

Bondokuy is a department or commune of Mouhoun Province in western Burkina Faso. Its capital lies at the town of Bondokuy. According to the 2019 census the department has a total population of 62,214.

== Towns and villages ==
- Anekuy (295 inhabitants)
- Bankouma (729 inhabitants)
- Bokuy (421 inhabitants)
- Bondokuy (3 982 inhabitants) (capital)
- Bolomakoté (3 792 inhabitants)
- Bouan (1 084 inhabitants)
- Bouenivouhoun (3 936 inhabitants)
- Dampan (826 inhabitants)
- Diekuy (292 inhabitants)
- Dora (2 021 inhabitants)
- Farakuy (142 inhabitants)
- Kera (2 047 inhabitants)
- Koko (2 065 inhabitants)
- Koumana (9 767 inhabitants)
- Moukouna (2 493 inhabitants)
- Ouakara (2 909 inhabitants)
- Silmimossi (1 605 inhabitants)
- Syn-Bekuy (387 inhabitants)
- Syn-Dombokuy (335 inhabitants)
- Syn-Dounkuy (367 inhabitants)
- Tankuy (930 inhabitants)
- Tia (2 504 inhabitants)
- Toun (1 018 inhabitants)
- Wakuy (1 376 inhabitants)
- Zanzaka (1 131 inhabitants)
- Zoromtenga (759 inhabitants)
