= Tiiu Kera =

US Air Force general

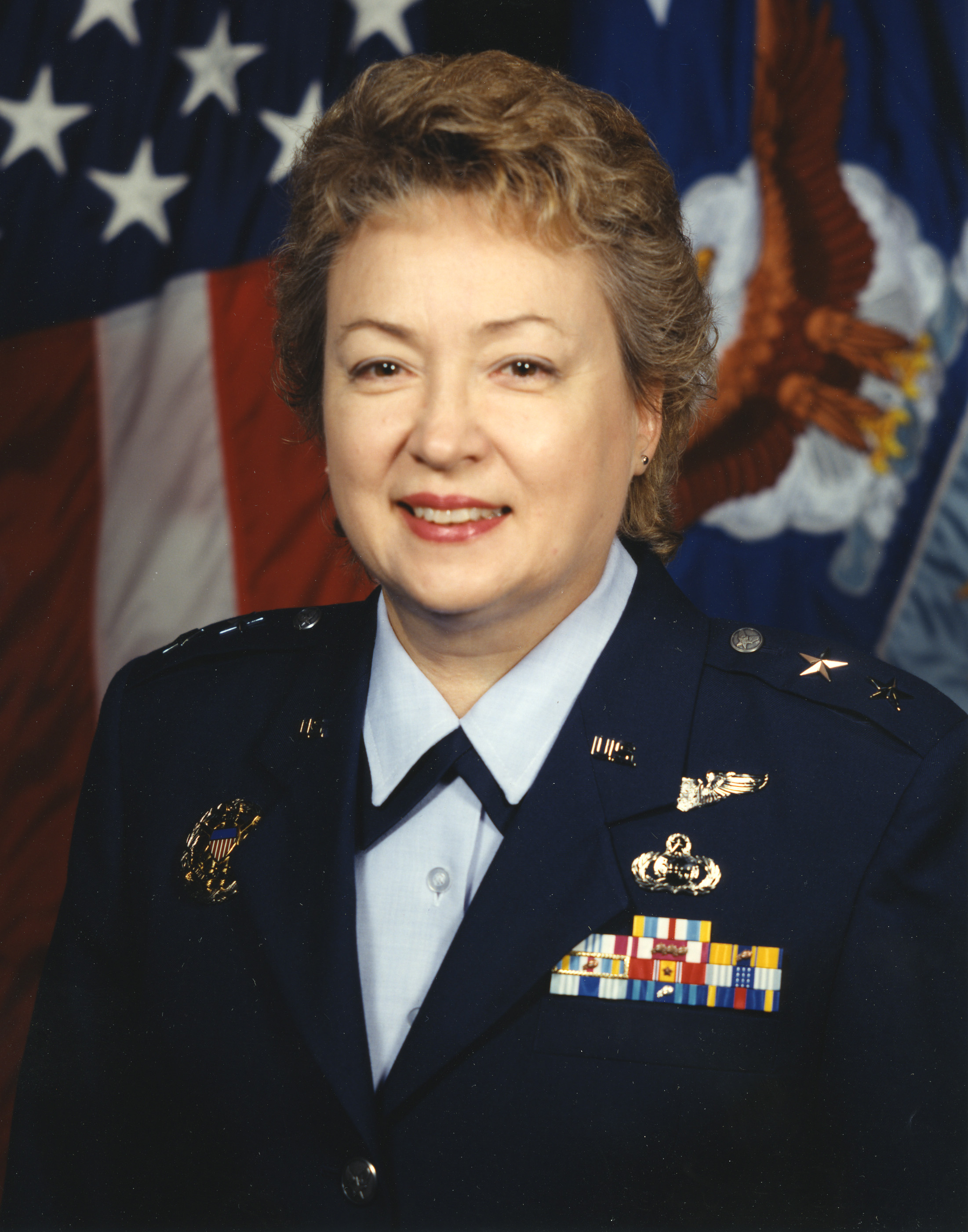
Tiiu Kera

Tiiu Kera (born July 21, 1945) is a retired United States Air Force major general.

== Career ==
The general was born in a displaced persons camp in Baden-Württemberg, Germany, to Estonian parents who were refugees of World War II. The family eventually settled in the Rochester, New York in 1949. She is a graduate of Valparaiso University and Indiana University Bloomington. In 1973, Kera was commissioned as a distinguished graduate of Officer Training School. After assignments at several Air Force bases in the United States and South Korea, she served as a staff officer at Headquarters U.S. Air Force and Tactical Air Command. She then served as chief of the Military Personnel Branch at Langley Air Force Base, as director of personnel management at Headquarters Space Division, and as a strategic planner at the Joint Staff. After a fellowship year at the Harvard Center for International Affairs, she returned to Headquarters U.S. Air Force where she was responsible for security issues in the former Warsaw Pact and for developing military-to-military relations with those countries.

As the first U.S. defense attach to Lithuania, the general represented U.S. defense leadership to the Lithuanian ministry of defense and armed forces, served as the defense adviser to the U.S. ambassador, and managed U.S. security assistance programs. She was director of intelligence for Headquarters U.S. Strategic Command, serving as senior intelligence officer and principal intelligence adviser to the commander in chief.

Maj. Gen. Tiiu Kera was deputy chief, Central Security Service, National Security Agency, Fort George G. Meade, Maryland. As the principal adviser to the agency's director on military cryptology issues, she ensures military service contributions to the NSA/CSS's responsibilities as a national and combat support agency. She oversees the functioning of military cryptology system operations; develops policy and guidance on signals intelligence and information assurance for the military services; manages the partnership of the NSA/CSS and the Service Cryptologic Elements; and oversees military resource management at NSA and CSS.

Kera retired on February 1, 2002. She is married to former United States Air Force military attorney and procurement officer Norm Wolfe.

== Education ==
- 1967 Bachelor of Arts degree in political science, Valparaiso University, Valparaiso, Indiana
- 1969 Master of political science degree, Indiana University Bloomington
- 1976 Distinguished graduate, Squadron Officer School, Maxwell Air Force Base, Alabama
- 1982 Air Command and Staff College, by seminar
- 1986 Air War College, by seminar
- 1988 National War College, Fort Lesley J. McNair, Washington, D.C.
- 1991 Fellow, Center for International Affairs, Harvard University, Cambridge, Massachusetts

== Assignments ==
1. December 1973 – July 1975, chief, quality control section, 1100th Air Base Wing, Bolling Air Force Base, D.C.
2. July 1975 – July 1978, chief, quality control section and chief, personnel utilization section, 3245th Air Base Group, Hanscom Air Force Base, Massachusetts
3. July 1978 – July 1979, chief, career progression section, 51st Combat Support Group, Osan Air Base, South Korea
4. July 1979 – July 1980, staff officer, Air Staff Training Program, Directorate of Civilian Personnel, Headquarters U.S. Air Force, the Pentagon, Washington, D.C.
5. August 1980 – June 1983, chief, Airmen Base Support Assignments Branch and chief, Support Officer Assignments Branch, Headquarters Tactical Air Command, Langley Air Force Base, Virginia.
6. June 1983 – July 1984, chief, Military Personnel Branch, 1st Tactical Fighter Wing, Langley Air Force Base, Virginia.
7. July 1984 – July 1987, chief, personnel plans, and director, personnel management, Headquarters Space Division, Los Angeles, Calif.
8. August 1987 – June 1988, student, National War College, Fort Lesley J. McNair, Washington, D.C.
9. June 1988 – August 1990, strategic planner, then chief, Strategic Concepts Branch, Directorate of Strategic Plans and Policy, the Joint Staff, the Pentagon, Washington, D.C.
10. August 1990 – August 1991, fellow, Center for International Affairs, Harvard University, Cambridge, Massachusetts
11. August 1991 – January 1992, political-military affairs officer, Deputy Chief of Staff for Plans and Operations, Headquarters U.S. Air Force, the Pentagon, Washington, D.C.
12. January 1992 – July 1993, attach and language training
13. July 1993 – August 1995, U.S. defense and air attach, Vilnius, Lithuania
14. August 1995 – October 1998, director of intelligence, Headquarters U.S. Strategic Command, Offutt Air Force Base, Neb.
15. October 1998 – March 1999, chief of staff to the deputy director of operations, National Security Agency, Fort George G. Meade, Maryland
16. October 1998 – November 1999, assistant deputy director of operations, National Security Agency, Fort George G. Meade, Maryland
17. November 1999 – January 2002, deputy chief, Central Security Service, National Security Agency, Fort George G. Meade, Maryland

== Major awards and decorations ==
- Defense Superior Service Medal with oak leaf cluster
- Defense Meritorious Service Medal
- Meritorious Service Medal with three oak leaf clusters
- Air Force Commendation Medal with oak leaf cluster

== Effective dates of promotion ==
- Second Lieutenant December 6, 1973
- First Lieutenant December 6, 1975
- Captain December 6, 1977
- Major November 1, 1982
- Lieutenant Colonel March 1, 1985
- Colonel October 1, 1989
- Brigadier General August 1, 1995
- Major General July 27, 1998
