= Douroula =

- Location in Burkina Faso
- Coordinates: 12°35′N 3°18′W
- Country: Burkina Faso
- Region: Boucle du Mouhoun
- Province: Mouhoun Province
- Department: Douroula Department

Population (2005)
  - Total: 3,471
- Time zone: UTC+0 (GMT 0)

UNESCO World Heritage Site
- Official name: Ancient ferrous metallurgy sites of Burkina Faso
- Criteria: Cultural: (iii), (iv), (vi)
- Designated: 2019 (43rd session)
- Reference no.: 1602
- Region: Africa
- Area: 122.3 ha
- Buffer Zone: 797.5 ha

Douroula is a town in Burkina Faso. It is the county seat of Douroula Department in the province Mouhoun.

Near the town are ruins of a smelting furnace and evidence of ferrous metallurgy dating back to the 8th century BC. This is the oldest confirmed metallurgy site in Burkina Faso discovered to date. Because of this, on 5 July 2019, Douroula was inscribed along with other ancient metallurgy complexes Tiwêga, Yamané, Kindibo and Békuy on the UNESCO World Heritage List as part of the Ancient Ferrous Metallurgy Sites of Burkina Faso.
