= Dédougou =

- City
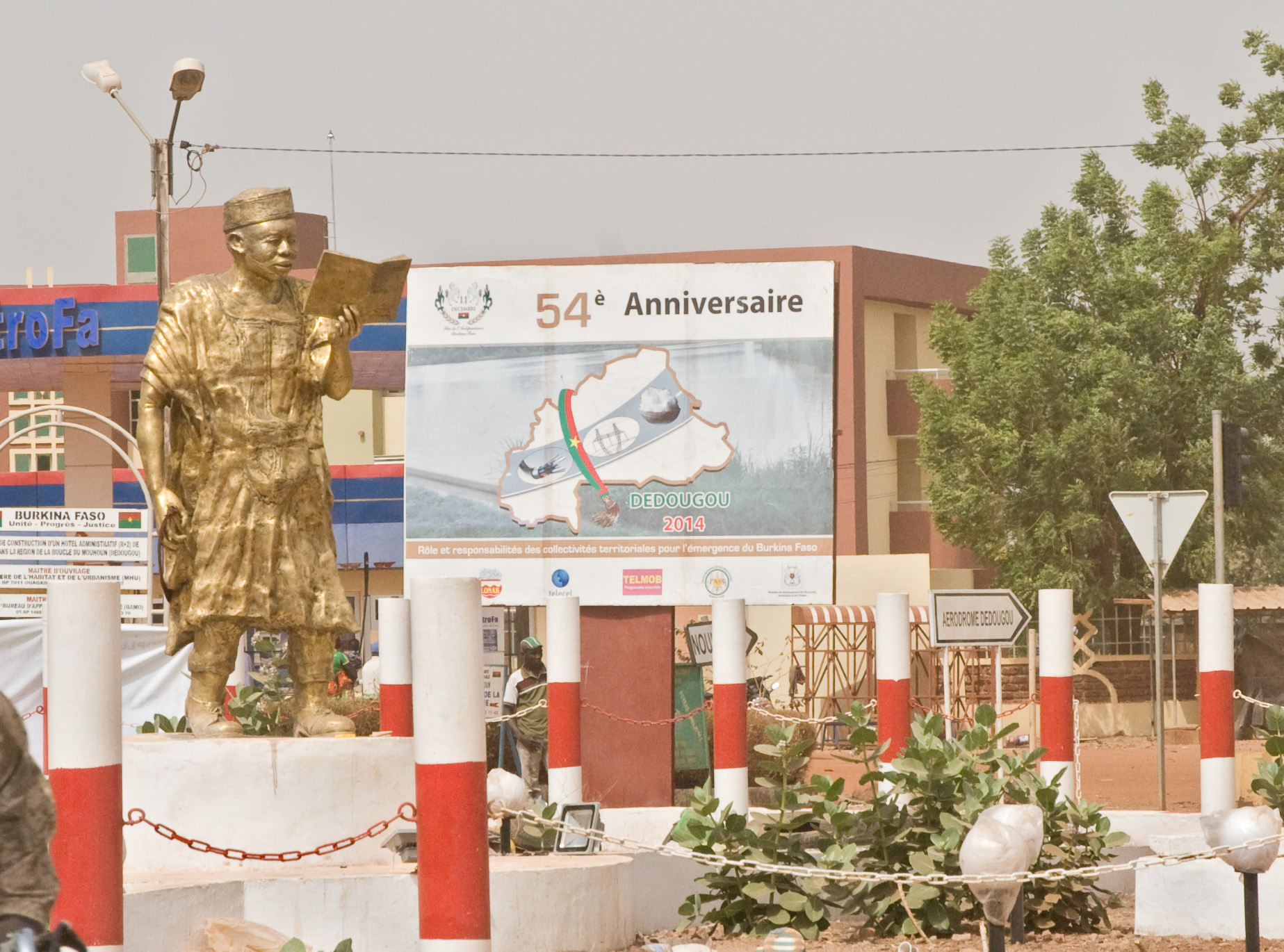

- Location within Burkina Faso, West Africa
- Coordinates: 12°28′N 3°28′W
- Country: Burkina Faso
- Region: Boucle du Mouhoun Region
- Province: Mouhoun Province
- Elevation: 299 m (981 ft)

Population (2019 census)
  - Total: 63,617
- Time zone: UTC+0 (GMT)
- Area code: +226 20
- Website: Official website

Dédougou is a city located in western Burkina Faso. It is the capital city of Mouhoun Province and Boucle du Mouhoun Region. The main ethnic groups are the Marka and the Bwa. The population of Dédougou was 37,793 in 2006; 18,778 were male and 19,015 were female. It is the 10th largest city in Burkina Faso.

The village of Dedougou was an early stronghold of pro-French sentiment in the region, and became the center of a cercle in 1911. Rival villages were obliterated.

Dédougou is also the location of the Festival International des Masques et des Arts (FESTIMA), a biennial international festival celebrating traditional cultural masks.

== Climate ==
Dédougou has a tropical savanna climate (Köppen climate classification Aw).

Climate data for Dédougou (1991–2020)
Month	Jan	Feb	Mar	Apr	May	Jun	Jul	Aug	Sep	Oct	Nov	Dec	Year
Record high °C (°F)	39.3 (102.7)	41.6 (106.9)	42.2 (108.0)	44.3 (111.7)	44.4 (111.9)	40.8 (105.4)	38.8 (101.8)	35.8 (96.4)	38.9 (102.0)	39.5 (103.1)	39.2 (102.6)	38.5 (101.3)	44.4 (111.9)
Mean daily maximum °C (°F)	33.6 (92.5)	36.2 (97.2)	38.7 (101.7)	39.3 (102.7)	37.9 (100.2)	35.1 (95.2)	32.6 (90.7)	31.3 (88.3)	32.8 (91.0)	35.9 (96.6)	36.6 (97.9)	34.6 (94.3)	35.4 (95.7)
Daily mean °C (°F)	25.8 (78.4)	28.7 (83.7)	31.9 (89.4)	33.2 (91.8)	32.1 (89.8)	29.6 (85.3)	27.5 (81.5)	26.4 (79.5)	27.2 (81.0)	29.1 (84.4)	28.7 (83.7)	26.5 (79.7)	28.9 (84.0)
Mean daily minimum °C (°F)	18.5 (65.3)	21.2 (70.2)	24.5 (76.1)	26.6 (79.9)	26.4 (79.5)	24.5 (76.1)	23.1 (73.6)	22.6 (72.7)	22.6 (72.7)	23.0 (73.4)	21.0 (69.8)	18.9 (66.0)	22.7 (72.9)
Record low °C (°F)	12.1 (53.8)	13.0 (55.4)	14.5 (58.1)	19.4 (66.9)	19.4 (66.9)	18.8 (65.8)	19.7 (67.5)	19.3 (66.7)	19.2 (66.6)	18.0 (64.4)	16.4 (61.5)	13.2 (55.8)	12.1 (53.8)
Average precipitation mm (inches)	0.1 (0.00)	0.4 (0.02)	6.0 (0.24)	23.6 (0.93)	65.4 (2.57)	108.0 (4.25)	190.1 (7.48)	255.9 (10.07)	146.0 (5.75)	45.2 (1.78)	1.5 (0.06)	0.0 (0.0)	842.2 (33.16)
Average precipitation days (≥ 1.0 mm)	0.1	0.1	0.6	2.3	5.3	8.1	11.7	14.5	10.7	4.8	0.3	0.0	58.5
Average relative humidity (%)	21	17	21	29	47	62	73	80	77	58	32	22	45
Mean monthly sunshine hours	285.7	258.6	263.4	245.1	263.1	247.3	236.4	213.5	232.6	274.5	288.0	294.9	3,103.1
Source 1: NOAA
Source 2: Deutscher Wetterdienst (humidity 1983–1994)

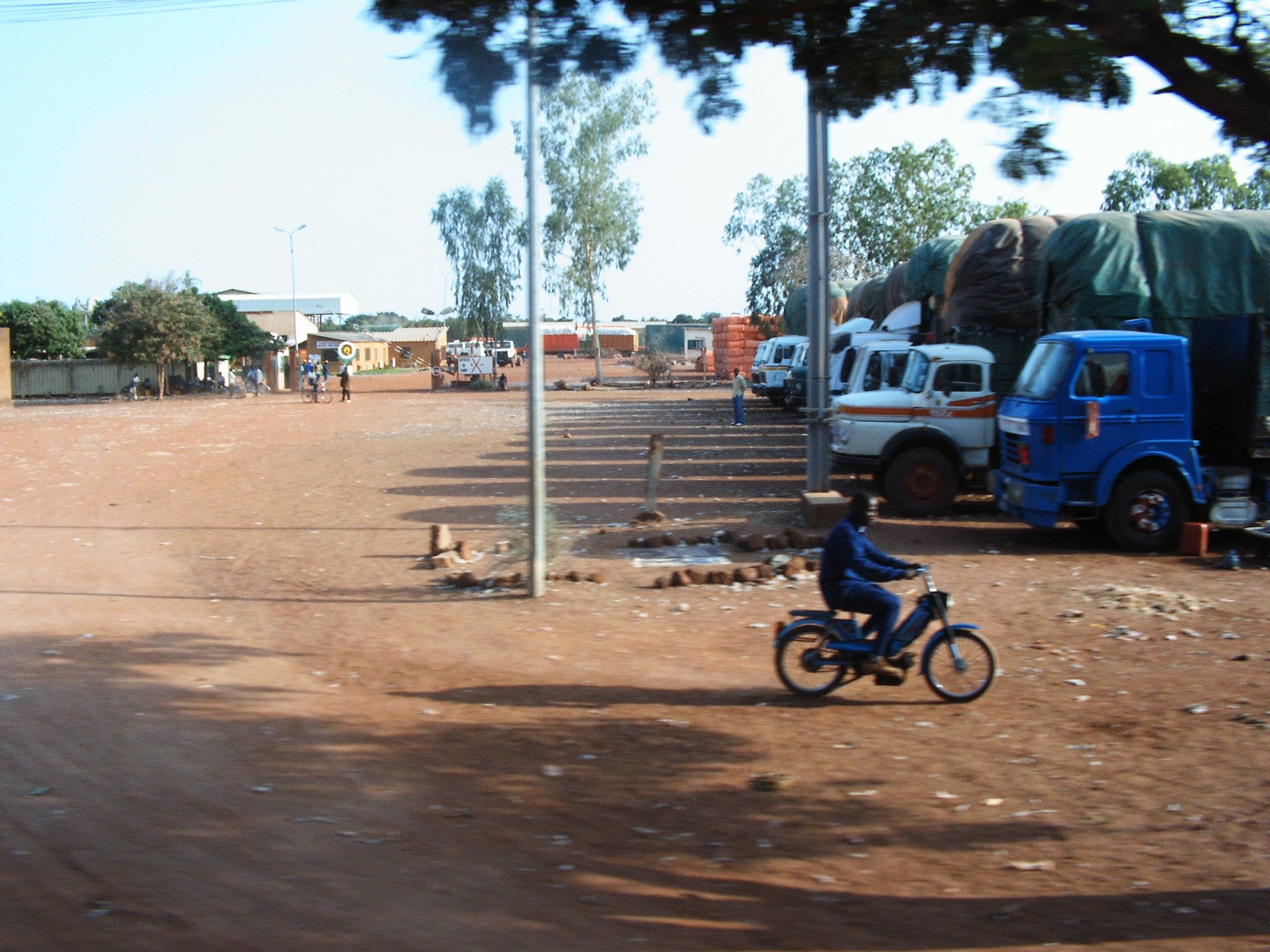
Cotton packing in Dédougou
