= Mouhoun Province =

Coordinates: 12°27′N 3°28′W

Mouhoun
- Province
- Location in Burkina Faso

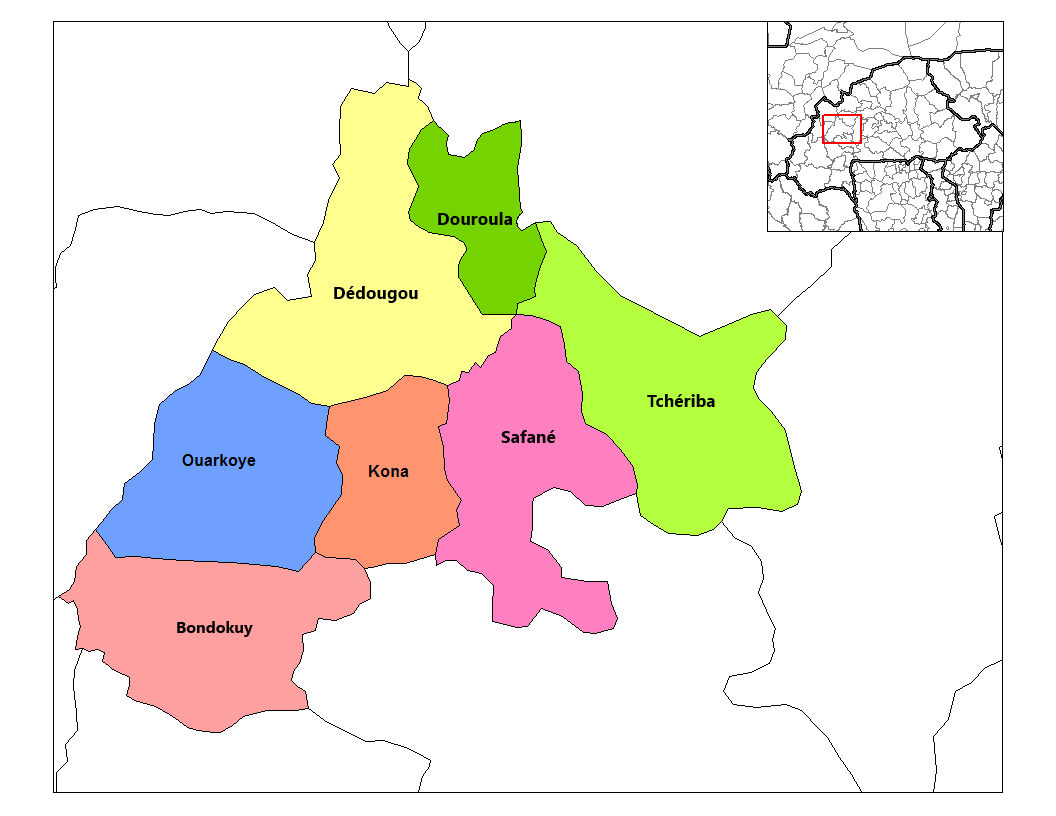
- Provincial map of its departments
- Country: Burkina Faso
- Region: Boucle du Mouhoun
- Capital: Dédougou

Area
  - Province: 6,659 km^{2} (2,571 sq mi)

Population (2019 census)
  - Province: 391,325
  - Density: 58.77/km^{2} (152.2/sq mi)
  - Urban: 63,617
- Time zone: UTC+0 (GMT 0)
- ISO 3166 code: BF-MOU

Mouhoun ([mu.un], "Black Volta") is one of the 45 provinces of Burkina Faso. It is in the Boucle du Mouhoun region. The capital of Mouhoun is Dédougou.

== Education ==
In 2011, the province had 210 primary schools and 34 secondary schools.

== Healthcare ==
In 2011, the province had 27 health and social promotion centers (Centres de santé et de promotion sociale), 7 doctors and 151 nurses.

== Demographics ==
Most people in the province live in rural areas; 260,295 Burkinabé live in the countryside with only 37,793 people residing in urban areas. There are 148,732 men living in Mouhoun Province and 149,356 women (2006 census).

== Departments ==
Mouhoun is divided into 7 departments:

The Departments of Mouhoun
| Departments | Capitals | Population (Census 2006) |
|---|---|---|
| Bondokuy Department | Bondokuy | 51,174 |
| Dédougou Department | Dédougou | 86,324 |
| Douroula Department | Douroula | 12,806 |
| Kona Department | Kona | 19,585 |
| Ouarkoye Department | Ouarkoye | 38,938 |
| Safané Department | Safané | 49,383 |
| Tchériba Department | Tchériba | 39,778 |

== See also ==
- Regions of Burkina Faso
- Provinces of Burkina Faso
- Departments of Burkina Faso
