= Terra nullius =

Principle of international law

Marie Byrd Land, the only unclaimed sector of Antarctica.

Terra nullius (/ˈtɛrə ˈnʌliəs/, plural terrae nullius) is a Latin expression meaning "nobody's land". Since the nineteenth century, it has been used in international law to refer to the principle by which territories deemed not to belong to any recognised sovereign state could be acquired through occupation. (Note: Even as to terra nullius, like a volcanic island, or territory abandoned by its former sovereign, a claimant by right as against all others has more to do than planting a flag or rearing a monument. From the 19th century the most generous settled view has been that discovery accompanied by symbolic acts give no more than "an inchoate title, an option, as against other states, to consolidate the first steps by proceeding to effective occupation within a reasonable time." — U.S. Supreme Court (1998) New Jersey v. New York) In historical scholarship, the term is also used retrospectively to describe colonial practices in which European powers claimed sovereignty over lands by referring to them as empty, vacant, or unowned, including in territories where indigenous populations were present. Since the twentieth century, the application of terra nullius to inhabited territories was rejected in several jurisdictions as part of increasing recognition of Indigenous rights, including in Mabo v Queensland (No 2) in Australia. Today Antarctica remains as the only major landmass that is sometimes considered to be wholly or partially terra nullius. Other territories sometimes claimed to be terra nullius include Bir Tawil, a strip of land between Egypt and Sudan, and four pockets of land on the banks of the Danube, on the Croatia–Serbia border; both due to border disputes where both competing claims involve assigning a particular piece of territory to the other party.

== Doctrine ==
In international law, the classical doctrine of terra nullius holds that territory can be acquired through occupation if it is not under the sovereignty of any state. Robert Jennings and Arthur Watts describe occupation as applicable to territory not already subject to state sovereignty, including uninhabited territory and territory inhabited by populations not regarded as constituting a state. Alexander Orakhelashvili states that in the 21st century there are few areas that are possibly terra nullius as almost all territory is under the sovereignty of a state.

Irene Watson argues that international law, including the doctrine of terra nullius, was part of a colonial project that divided the world into civilised and non-civilised states under which indigenous and other non-European societies were often not recognised as holding sovereignty, despite having their own systems of law and territorial organisation.

The application of terra nullius to inhabited territories has been severely curtailed in modern jurisprudence. In its Advisory Opinion on Western Sahara [1975] ICJ 12, the International Court of Justice held that territories inhabited by socially and politically organised peoples could not be regarded as terra nullius, a position that has not been overturned. This reasoning has since been cited in subsequent cases concerning Indigenous land rights, including in Mabo vs Queensland (No 2) (1992) in Australia where the High Court rejected the terra nullius doctrine as a legal fiction and recognised the pre-existing laws, customs, and land rights of Indigenous Australians. Regarding modern human rights perspectives, the Australian Human Rights Commission has argued that the doctrine is incompatible with contemporary human rights standards, and that "Terra nullius, racism and destruction of a peoples’ sovereignty are intrinsically linked, in Australia as in other former colonies".

== History ==
The concept of justifying the occupation of foreign territory by describing it as "vacant" or belonging to no-one, was sometimes employed by European colonial powers, even where the territory was inhabited by indigenous populations. Although the term terra nullius was not used in international law until the 19th century, historians and legal scholars sometimes apply it retrospectively to describe such cases. However, there is debate over whether the term is applicable before the 19th century.

Some writers have traced the concept to the Roman law term res nullius, meaning nobody's thing. In Roman law, things that were res nullius, such as wild animals (ferae bestiae), lost slaves and abandoned buildings could be taken as property by anyone by seizure. Benton and Straumann, however, state that the derivation of terra nullius from res nullius is "by analogy" only.

Sixteenth century writings on res nullius were in the context of European colonisation in the New World and the doctrine of discovery. In 1535, Domingo de Soto argued that Spain had no right to the Americas because the lands had not been res nullius at the time of discovery. Francisco de Vitoria, in 1539, also used the res nullius analogy to argue that the indigenous populations of the Americas, although "barbarians", had both sovereignty and private ownership over their lands, and that the Spanish had gained no legal right to possession through mere discovery of these lands. Nevertheless, Vitoria stated that the Spanish possibly had a limited right to rule the indigenous Americans because the latter "are unsuited to setting up or administering a commonwealth both legitimate and ordered in human and civil terms."

Alberico Gentili, in his De Jure Belli Libri Tres (1598), drew a distinction between the legitimate occupation of land that was res nullius and illegitimate claims of sovereignty through discovery and occupation of land that was not res nullius, as in the case of the Spanish claim to the Americas. Hugo Grotius, writing in 1625, also stated that discovery does not give a right to sovereignty over inhabited land, "For discovery applies to those things which belong to no one."

By the eighteenth century, however, some writers argued that "uncultivated" lands or territories used by nomadic peoples could be treated as effectively empty if it was not used in ways recognised by European legal and agricultural norms. William Blackstone, in 1765, wrote that territories that were already occupied and politically organised had to be acquired, if at all, through conquest or cession by treaty. In contrast, Blackstone suggested that if the territories were considered "desert and uncultivated", they could be settled and claimed through occupation.

Several years before Blackstone, Emer de Vattel, in his Le droit des gents (1758), explicitly argued that land can be regarded as empty even if there were people living in it - if those inhabitants were not farming it according to European standards. He justified his reasoning by claiming that people who chose to avoid labor and use the land for hunting and herding flocks, were not using the land efficiently and hence had "no reason to complain" if more industrious nations arrive to take possession of part of their lands. Vattel drew a distinction between land that was effectively occupied and cultivated, and the unsettled and uncultivated land of nomads which he argued was lawfully open to colonisation.

Borch states that many commentators erroneously interpreted this to mean that any uncultivated lands, whether inhabited or not, could be claimed by a colonising state by right of occupancy. Borch places the shift towards the view that "uncultivated" but inhabited lands were terra nullius primarily in the 19th century, and argues it was a result of political developments and the rise of new intellectual currents such as scientific racism and legal positivism.

The Berlin West Africa Conference of 1884-85 endorsed the principle that sovereignty over an unclaimed territory required effective occupation, and that where native populations had established effective occupation their sovereignty could not be unilaterally overturned by a colonising state.

The term terra nullius was used in 1885 in relation to the dispute between Spain and the United States over Contoy Island. Herman Eduard von Hoist, wrote, "Contoy was not, in an international sense, a desert, that is an abandoned island and hence terra nullius." In 1888, the Institut de Droit International introduced the concept of territorium nullius (nobody's territory) as a public law equivalent to the private law concept of res nullius.

In 1909, the Italian international jurist Camille Piccioni described the island of Spitsbergen in the Arctic Circle as terra nullius. Even though the island was inhabited by the nationals of several European countries, the inhabitants did not live under any formal sovereignty.

In subsequent decades, the term terra nullius gradually replaced territorium nullius. Fitzmaurice argues that the two concepts were initially distinct, territorium nullius applying to territory in which the inhabitants might have property rights but had not developed political sovereignty whereas terra nullius referred to an absence of property. Nevertheless, terra nullius also implied an absence of sovereignty because sovereignty required property rights acquired through the exploitation of nature. Michael Connor, however, argues that territorium nullius and terra nullius were the same concept, meaning land without sovereignty, and that property rights and cultivation of land were not part of the concept.

Since the 1940s, some historians used the term terra nullius to describe colonial legal reasoning used by British authorities in relation to their acquisition of indigenous-inhabited territories. Instead colonial actors at the time sometimes used the phrase "uninhabited land or island". The term "uninhabited" wasn't a literal concept to mean physical emptiness, but was used to regard a land as having no sovereign. However, European powers used a range of justifications for colonising inhabited lands and historians debate whether terra nullius adequately explains colonial reasoning before the 19th century.

The International Court of Justice in its 1975 Western Sahara advisory opinion assessed the doctrine of terra nullius in context of Spanish colonisation. The majority wrote, "'Occupation' being legally an original means of peaceably acquiring sovereignty over territory otherwise than by cession or succession, it was a cardinal condition of a valid 'occupation' that the territory should be terra nullius – a territory belonging to no-one – at the time of the act alleged to constitute the 'occupation'." The court found that at the time of colonisation in 1884, the inhabitants of Western Sahara were nomadic but socially and politically organised in tribes and under chiefs competent to represent them. It concluded that territories inhabited by organised peoples could not be regarded as terra nullius and therefore that Western Sahara was not terra nullius at the time of Spanish colonisation.

== Current claims of terra nullius ==
=== Antarctica ===
Marie Byrd Land

Antarctica is administered under the Antarctic Treaty System, under which the seven states that maintain claims on the continent agree to not attempt to enforce sovereignty in a multitude of areas and under which other signatories are under no obligation to recognise or respect any of those claims. There are multiple competing views for what Antarctica's status under international law is, with one being that the continent is terra nullius or having a status similar to it. There are also others who claim that the continent is not terra nullius but rather terra communalis. Separately from the continent as a whole, a sector of Antarctica known as Marie Byrd Land has been argued to be terra nullius, and the only such territory left in the world.

=== Gornja Siga and other pockets ===
The Croatia–Serbia border dispute in the Bačka and Baranja area. The Croatian claim corresponds to the red line, while the Serbian claim corresponds to the course of the Danube. Under Serbian control, claimed by Croatia Under de facto Croatian control, although not claimed by either Croatia or Serbia

Croatia and Serbia dispute several small areas on the east bank of the Danube. However, four pockets on the western river bank, of which Gornja Siga is the largest, are not claimed by either country. Serbia makes no claims on the land while Croatia states that the land belongs to Serbia. Croatia states that the disputed area is not terra nullius and they are negotiating with Serbia to settle the border.

=== Bir Tawil ===
Egypt-Sudan border dispute, with Bir Tawil in white.

Between Egypt and the Sudan is the 2,060 km^{2} (800 sq mi) landlocked territory of Bir Tawil, a discrepancy between borders drawn in 1899 and 1902. One map placed Bir Tawil under Sudan's control and the Halaib "Triangle" under Egypt's; the other did the reverse. Therefore both nations will continue to disavow Bir Tawil, stating it belongs to the other unless it is found to have greatest worth, to give their own nation the much larger Halaib Triangle, to the east, which has some minerals and is adjacent to the Red Sea. Bir Tawil has no settled population, but the land is used by Bedouins who roam the area. (Note: There is some disagreement of whether Bir Tawil is terra nullius or not. For example, see the news and analysis of Jeremiah Heaton's 2014 flag-planting in Bir Tawil, in an effort to make his daughter, Emily, a "princess" at Wash. Post, Opinio Juris, and KDVR Denver.)

== Historical claims of terra nullius ==
Several territories have been claimed to be terra nullius. In a minority of those claims, international and domestic courts have ruled on whether the territory is or was terra nullius or not.

=== Africa ===
==== Burkina Faso and Niger ====
A narrow strip of land adjacent to two territorial markers along the Burkina Faso–Niger border was claimed by neither country until the International Court of Justice settled a more extensive territorial dispute in 2013. The former unclaimed territory was awarded to Niger.

==== Western Sahara ====
At the request of Morocco, the International Court of Justice in 1975 addressed whether Western Sahara was terra nullius at the time of Spanish colonization in 1884. The court found in its advisory opinion that the inhabitants of Western Sahara were socially and politically organised under tribal systems and recognised authorities. It concluded that the legal conditions for qualifying the territory as terra nullius were therefore not satisfied.

=== Asia ===
==== Pinnacle Islands (Diaoyu Islands/Senkaku Islands) ====
A disputed archipelago in the East China Sea, the uninhabited Pinnacle Islands, were claimed by Japan to have become part of its territory as terra nullius in January 1895, following the Japanese victory in the First Sino-Japanese War. However, this interpretation is not accepted by the People's Republic of China (PRC) and the Republic of China (Taiwan), both of whom claim sovereignty over the islands.

==== Saudi–Iraqi neutral zone ====
It was an area of 7,044 km^{2} (2,720 sq mi; 704,400 ha; 1,741,000 acres) on the border between Saudi Arabia and Iraq within which the border between the two countries had not been settled. The neutral zone came into existence following the Uqair Protocol of 1922 that defined the border between Iraq and the Sultanate of Nejd (Saudi Arabia's predecessor state). An agreement to partition the neutral zone was reached by Iraqi and Saudi representatives on 26 December 1981, and approved by the Iraqi National Assembly on 28 January 1982. The territory was divided on an unknown date between 28 January and 30 July 1982. Notice was given to the United Nations in June 1991.

==== Saudi–Kuwaiti neutral zone ====
The 1922 Uqair Convention did not define a boundary between the Saudi Arabia's predecessor state, Sultanate of Nejd, and Kuwait. This was due to the nomadic Bedouin tribes of the area, who largely didn't recognise national boundaries, and the limited economic potential of this area of desert. The discovery of oil in the area prompted the countries to negotiate a boundary. An initial agreement in 1965 was officially ratified in 1970, setting the current border.

==== Scarborough Shoal (South China Sea) ====
The People's Republic of China, the Republic of China (Taiwan) and the Philippines claim Scarborough Shoal, also known as Panatag Shoal or Huangyan Island (simplified Chinese: 黄岩岛; traditional Chinese: 黃巖島; pinyin: Huángyán Dǎo). The nearest landmass is the Philippine island of Luzon at 220 km (119 nmi), located in the South China Sea. The Philippines claims it under the principle of terra nullius and the fact that it lies within its EEZ (exclusive economic zone). Meanwhile, both China and Taiwan claim the shoal based on historical records that Chinese fishermen had discovered and mapped the shoal since the 13th century.

Previously, the shoal was administered as part of Municipality of Masinloc, Province of Zambales, by the Philippines. Since the Scarborough Shoal standoff in 2012, the shoal has been administered as part of Xisha District, Sansha City, Hainan Province, by the People's Republic of China. Taiwan places the shoal under the administration of Cijin District, Kaohsiung City, but does not have control of the shoal.

The Permanent Court of Arbitration (PCA) denied the lawfulness of China's claim in 2016; China rejected the ruling, calling it "ill-founded". In 2019, Taiwan also rejected the ruling and has sent more naval vessels to the area.

It has been speculated that Scarborough Shoal is a prime location for the construction of an artificial island and Chinese ships have been seen in the vicinity of the shoal. However, analysis of photos has concluded that the ships lack dredging equipment and therefore represent no imminent threat of reclamation work.

=== Europe ===
==== Ireland ====
The term terra nullius has been applied by some modern academics in discussing the English colonisation of Ireland, although the term is not used in the international law sense and is often used as an analogy. Griffen and Cogliano state that the English viewed Ireland as a terra nullius. In The Irish Difference: A Tumultuous History of Ireland's Breakup With Britain, Fergal Tobin writes that "Ireland had no tradition of unified statehood and no culturally unified establishment. Indeed, it had never known any kind of political unity until a version of it was imposed by Cromwell's sword […] So the English Protestant interest […] came to regard Ireland as a kind of terra nullius." Similarly, Bruce McLeod writes in The Geography of Empire in English Literature, 1580-1745 that "although the English were familiar with Ireland and its geography in comparison to North America, they treated Ireland as though it were terra nullius and thus easily and geometrically subdivided into territorial units." Rolston and McVeigh trace this attitude back to Gerald of Wales (13th century), who wrote "This people despises work on the land, has little use for the money-making of towns, contemns the rights and privileges of citizenship, and desires neither to abandon, nor lose respect for, the life which it has been accustomed to lead in the woods and countryside." The semi-nomadism of the native Irish meant that some English judged them not to be productive users of land. However, Rolston and McVeigh state that Gerald made it clear that Ireland was acquired by conquest and not through the occupation of terra nullius.

==== Rockall ====
According to Ian Mitchell, Rockall was terra nullius until it was claimed by the United Kingdom in 1955. It was formally annexed in 1972.

==== Sealand ====
In 1967, Paddy Roy Bates claimed HM Fort Roughs, an abandoned British anti-aircraft gun tower in the North Sea, as the "Principality of Sealand". The structure is now within British territorial waters and no country recognises Sealand.

==== Svalbard ====
Denmark–Norway, the Dutch Republic, the Kingdom of Scotland (hence de facto also England) all claimed sovereignty over the archipelago of Svalbard in the seventeenth century, but none permanently occupied it. Expeditions from each of these polities visited Svalbard principally during the summer for whaling, with the first two sending a few wintering parties in the 1620s and 1630s.

During the 19th century, both Norway and Russia made strong claims to the archipelago. In 1909, Italian jurist Camille Piccioni described Spitzbergen, as it was then known, as terra nullius:

The issue would have been simpler if Spitzbergen, until now terra nullius, could have been attributed to a single state, for reasons of neighbouring or earlier occupation. But this is not the case and several powers can, for different reasons, make their claims to this territory which still has no master.

Any dispute was eventually resolved by the Svalbard Treaty ratified in 1925 which recognises and accords Norwegian sovereignty, with shared mineral rights.

=== North America ===
==== Canada ====
Joseph Trutch, the first Lieutenant Governor of British Columbia, insisted that First Nations had never owned land, and thus their land claims could safely be ignored. It is for this reason that most of British Columbia remains unceded land.

In Guerin v. The Queen, a Canadian Supreme Court decision of 1984 on aboriginal rights, the Court stated that the government has a fiduciary duty toward the First Nations of Canada and established aboriginal title to be a sui generis right. Since then there has been a more complicated debate and a general narrowing of the definition of "fiduciary duty".

In 2014 Tsilhqot’in Nation v. British Columbia, the Supreme Court of Canada ruled that the legal doctrine of terra nullius never rightfully applied in Canada.

==== Eastern Greenland ====
Norway occupied and claimed parts of (then uninhabited) eastern Greenland in 1931, claiming that it constituted terra nullius and calling the territory Erik the Red's Land.

The Permanent Court of International Justice ruled against the Norwegian claim. The Norwegians accepted the ruling and withdrew their claim.

==== United States ====
A similar concept of "uncultivated land" was employed by John Quincy Adams to identify supposedly unclaimed wilderness.

===== Guano Islands =====
The Guano Islands Act of 18 August 1856 enabled citizens of the U.S. to take possession of islands containing guano deposits. The islands can be located anywhere, so long as they are not occupied and not within the jurisdiction of other governments. It also empowers the President of the United States to use the military to protect such interests, and establishes the criminal jurisdiction of the United States.

=== Oceania ===
==== Australia ====
The British penal colony of New South Wales, which included more than half of mainland Australia, was proclaimed by Governor Captain Arthur Phillip at Sydney in February 1788. At the time of British colonisation, Aboriginal Australians had occupied Australia for at least 50,000 years. They were complex hunter-gatherers with diverse economies and societies and about 250 different language groups. The Aboriginal population of the Sydney area was an estimated 4,000 to 8,000 people who were organised in clans which occupied land with traditional boundaries.

There is debate over whether Australia was colonised by the British from 1788 on the basis that the land was terra nullius. Frost, Attwood and others argue that even though the term terra nullius was not used in the eighteenth century, there was widespread acceptance of the concept that a state could acquire territory through occupation of land that was not already under sovereignty and was uninhabited or inhabited by peoples who had not developed permanent settlements, agriculture, property rights or political organisation recognised by European states. Borch, however, states that, "it seems much more likely that there was no legal doctrine maintaining that inhabited land could be regarded as ownerless, nor was this the basis of official policy, in the eighteenth century or before. Rather it seems to have developed as a legal theory in the nineteenth century."

In Mabo v Queensland (No 2) (1992), Justice Dawson stated, "Upon any account, the policy which was implemented and the laws which were passed in New South Wales make it plain that, from the inception of the colony, the Crown treated all land in the colony as unoccupied and afforded no recognition to any form of native interest in the land."

Stuart Banner states that the first known Australian legal use of the concept (although not the term) terra nullius was in 1819 in a tax dispute between Barron Field and the Governor of New South Wales Lachlan Macquarie. The matter was referred to British Attorney General Samuel Shepherd and Solicitor General Robert Gifford who advised that New South Wales had not been acquired by conquest or cession, but by possession as "desert and uninhabited".

In 1835, a Proclamation by Governor Bourke declared that the Crown was the sole authority for distributing land in Australia, implementing the concept subsequently called terra nullius. British subjects could not obtain title over vacant Crown land directly from Aboriginal Australians.

In R v Murrell (1836) Justice Burton of the Supreme Court of New South Wales stated, "although it might be granted that on the first taking possession of the Colony, the aborigines were entitled to be recognised as free and independent, yet they were not in such a position with regard to strength as to be considered free and independent tribes. They had no sovereignty."

In the Privy Council case Cooper v Stuart (1889), Lord Watson stated that New South Wales was, "a tract of territory practically unoccupied, without settled inhabitants or settled law, at the time when it was peacefully annexed to the British dominions."

In the Mabo Case (1992), the High Court of Australia considered the question of whether Australia had been colonised by Britain on the basis that it was terra nullius. The court did not consider the legality of the initial colonisation as this was a matter of international law and, "The acquisition of territory by a sovereign state for the first time is an act of state which cannot be challenged, controlled or interfered with by the courts of that state." The questions for decision included the implications of the initial colonisation for the transmission of the common law to New South Wales and whether the common law recognised that the Indigenous inhabitants had any form of native title to land.

Dismissing a number of previous authorities, the court rejected the "enlarged notion of terra nullius", by which lands inhabited by Indigenous peoples could be considered desert and uninhabited for the purposes of Australian municipal law. The judge, Gerald Brennan, recognised that although Australia had been treated as settled under the doctrine of terra nullius, in fact it was not "desert and uninhabited". Citing the ICJ's 1975 Western Sahara ruling, Brennan noted that modern international law no longer generally accepts the colonial idea that an inhabited land can be labelled as "empty" (terra nullius), and adopted the legal approach consistent with that development. The court found that the common law of Australia recognised a form of native title held by the Indigenous peoples of Australia and that this title persisted unless extinguished by a valid exercise of sovereign power inconsistent with the continued right to enjoy native title.

==== Clipperton Island ====
The sovereignty of Clipperton Island was settled by arbitration between France and Mexico. King Victor Emmanuel III of Italy rendered a decision in 1931 that the sovereignty of Clipperton Island belongs to France from the date of November 17, 1858. The Mexican claim was rejected for lack of proof of prior Spanish discovery and, in any event, no effective occupation by Mexico before 1858, when the island was therefore territorium nullius, and the French occupation then was sufficient and legally continuing.

=== South America ===
==== Patagonia ====
Patagonia was according to some considerations regarded a terra nullius in the 19th century. This notion ignored the Spanish Crown's recognition of indigenous Mapuche sovereignty and is considered by scholars Nahuelpán and Antimil to have set the stage for an era of Chilean "republican colonialism".

== Palestine ==
From 1517, Palestine was part of the Ottoman Empire. Following World War I, it became the British Mandate of Palestine, established as a Class A mandate under the League of Nations system, which applied to former Ottoman territories considered provisionally independent and administered under international supervision, with the expectation of eventual self-government rather than transfer of sovereignty to the mandatory power.

Since the end of the British Mandate, there have been claims that Palestine, or parts of it, constituted terra nullius under international law. These claims have little support in international legal scholarship.

John Quigley links claims that Palestine was terra nullius in 1948 to the "sovereignty-vacuum theory", which states that Britain created a legal vacuum when it withdrew from its mandate over Palestine. The legal vacuum theory has been criticised as resembling colonial reasoning, insofar as it assumes the absence or suspension of continuing indigenous legal and political rights.

A number of scholars reject the premise that sovereignty over Palestine was extinguished or unallocated in 1948. Henry Cattan argues that Palestine was never terra nullius and could not be "given away by the United Nations", since the UN lacked "power, dominion or sovereignty in Palestine" to dispose of the territory. Legal scholars Ian Brownlie and Elihu Lauterpacht argue that the United Nations General Assembly lacked authority under Resolution 181 to transfer sovereignty or create territorial title. Brownlie states that an "inhabited territory cannot be regarded as terra nullius susceptible to appropriation by individual states in case of abandonment by the existing sovereign", citing the Advisory Opinion on Western Sahara [1975] as a legal example in which inhabited territory was treated as incompatible with terra nullius, and argued that upon termination of a mandate, sovereignty must remain legally located rather than extinguished. Jean-François Gareau, writing in 2005, similarly states that the territory claimed by Palestine was not terra nullius but was under the sovereignty of the Palestinian people pending the exercise of self-determination. David Kretzmer likewise writes that the West Bank was not terra nullius when occupied in 1967, and that its population retains the right to self-determination.

As of 26 September 2025, 157 UN member states recognised the State of Palestine, and most of these recognised its borders as including the West Bank, Gaza Strip and East Jerusalem.

S. Ilan Troen argues that terra nullius remains a central concept in contemporary debates over Jewish claims to Palestine. Other scholars, including Tina Al-khersan, Azadeh Shahshahani, and Atalia Omer, argue that variants of terra nullius reasoning have been used in modern legal and political discourse to justify the dispossession of Palestinians. Scholars Alexandre Kedar, Amara Ahmad, and Oren Yiftachel, further argue that Israel's "Dead Negev Doctrine" is a variant of terra nullius reasoning used to dispossess Bedouins.

== See also ==
- Aboriginal title
  - Australian history wars
  - Henry A. Reynolds
  - Native title in Australia
    - Mabo v Queensland
    - Wik Peoples v Queensland
- Allodial title
- Antarctic Treaty System
- Common heritage of humanity
- Discovery doctrine
- Extraterrestrial real estate
- Frontier
- Frontier thesis
- Indigenous land rights
- International waters
- International zones
- Georgism
- Land claim
- Manifest destiny
- No man's land
- Res nullius (original and broader formulation in law)
- Space colonization
- Space law
- Uncontacted peoples
- Wilderness

=== Appropriation concepts ===
- Adverse possession
- Homestead principle
- Original appropriation
- Pedis possessio
- Seasteading
- Usucaption
- Uti possidetis

== Sources ==
- Benton, Lauren; Straumann, Benjamin (February 2010). "Acquiring empire by law: From Roman doctrine to early modern European practice". Law and History Review. 28 (1). American Society for Legal History: 1–38. doi:10.1017/S0738248009990022. JSTOR 40646121. S2CID 143079931.
- "Mabo v Queensland (No 2) ("Mabo case") [1992] HCA 23". Australasian Legal Information Institute. 1992.
- Orakhelashvili, Alexander (2022). Akehurst's Modern Introduction to International Law (9th ed.). Abington and New York: Routledge. ISBN 9780367753467.
