= Picchioni =

Picchioni is an Italian surname. Notable people with the surname include:

- Ernesto Picchioni (1900–1967), Italian serial killer
- Rolando Picchioni (1936–2023), Italian politician

== See also ==
- Piccioni
