= Tapoa =

Tapoa may refer to:

- Tapoa Province of Burkina Faso
- Tapoa River in the Tapoa Province of Burkina Faso
