= Burkina Faso–Niger border =

International border

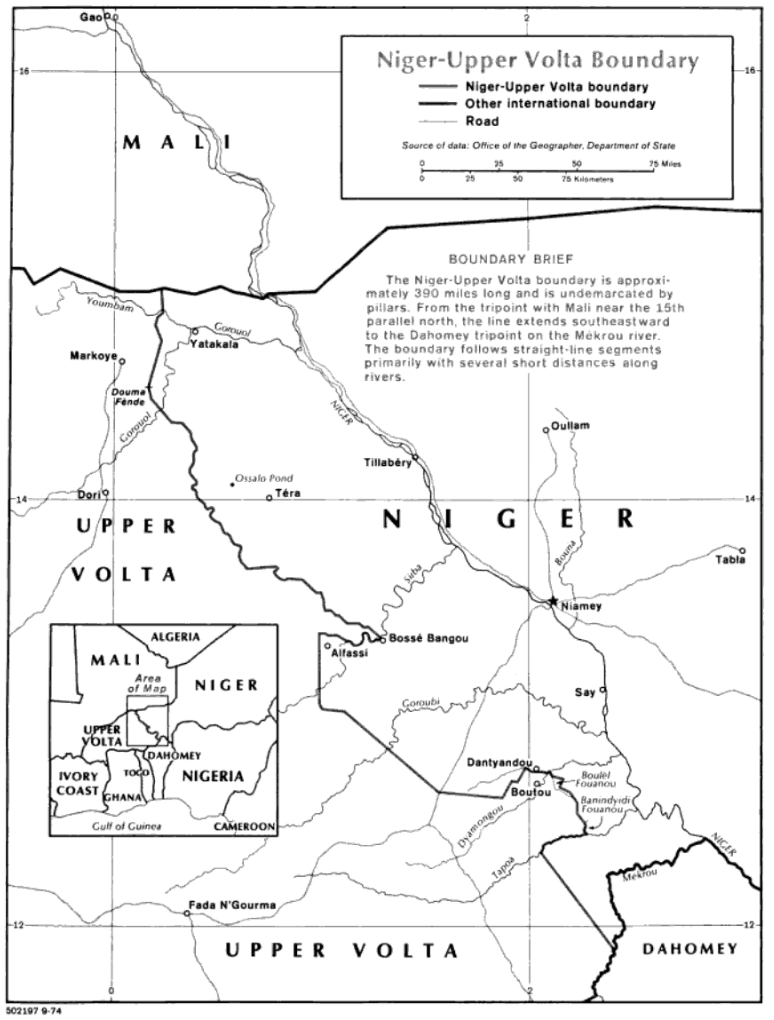
Burkina Faso-Niger border map

The Burkina Faso–Niger border is 622 km (386 mi) in length and runs from the tripoint with Mali in the north to the tripoint with Benin in the south.

== Description ==
The border starts at the tripoint with Mali in the north, and then proceeds in a generally south-eastwards direction (save for a small Burkinabe protrusion) following a series of predominantly straight lines, as well as some rivers such as the Tapoa, before reaching the Beninese tripoint on the Mékrou River.

== History ==
The 1880s saw an intense competition between the European powers for territories in Africa, a process known as the Scramble for Africa. The process culminated in the Berlin Conference of 1884, in which the European nations concerned agreed upon their respective territorial claims and the rules of engagements going forward. As a result of this France gained control of the upper valley of the Niger River (roughly equivalent to the areas of modern Mali and Niger). France began occupying the area of modern Mali (then often referred to as French Sudan) and Burkina Faso (then called Upper Volta) during the 1880s-90s, later occupying the territory of modern Niger by 1900. These areas came the control of the federal colony of French West Africa (Afrique occidentale française, abbreviated AOF). The internal divisions of this polity underwent several changes during its existence; what are now Mali, Niger and Burkina Faso were initially united as Upper Senegal and Niger, with Niger constituting a military territory ruled from Zinder. The Niger military territory was split off in 1911, becoming a separate colony in 1922, and Mali and Upper Volta were constituted as separate colonies in 1919. Prior to 1926-27 the Niger-Upper Volta border was formed entirely by the Niger river, however in that period by French decree Niger gained the areas west of the river which it holds today. A more precise border between the two entities was delimited in 1927. In 1932 Upper Volta was abolished, with its territory parcelled out amongst the surrounding colonies; as a result Niger gained much of the eastern areas of Upper Volta, giving it a common border with the French colonies of Togo and the Ivory Coast. Upper Volta was reinstituted in 1947 within its previous borders.

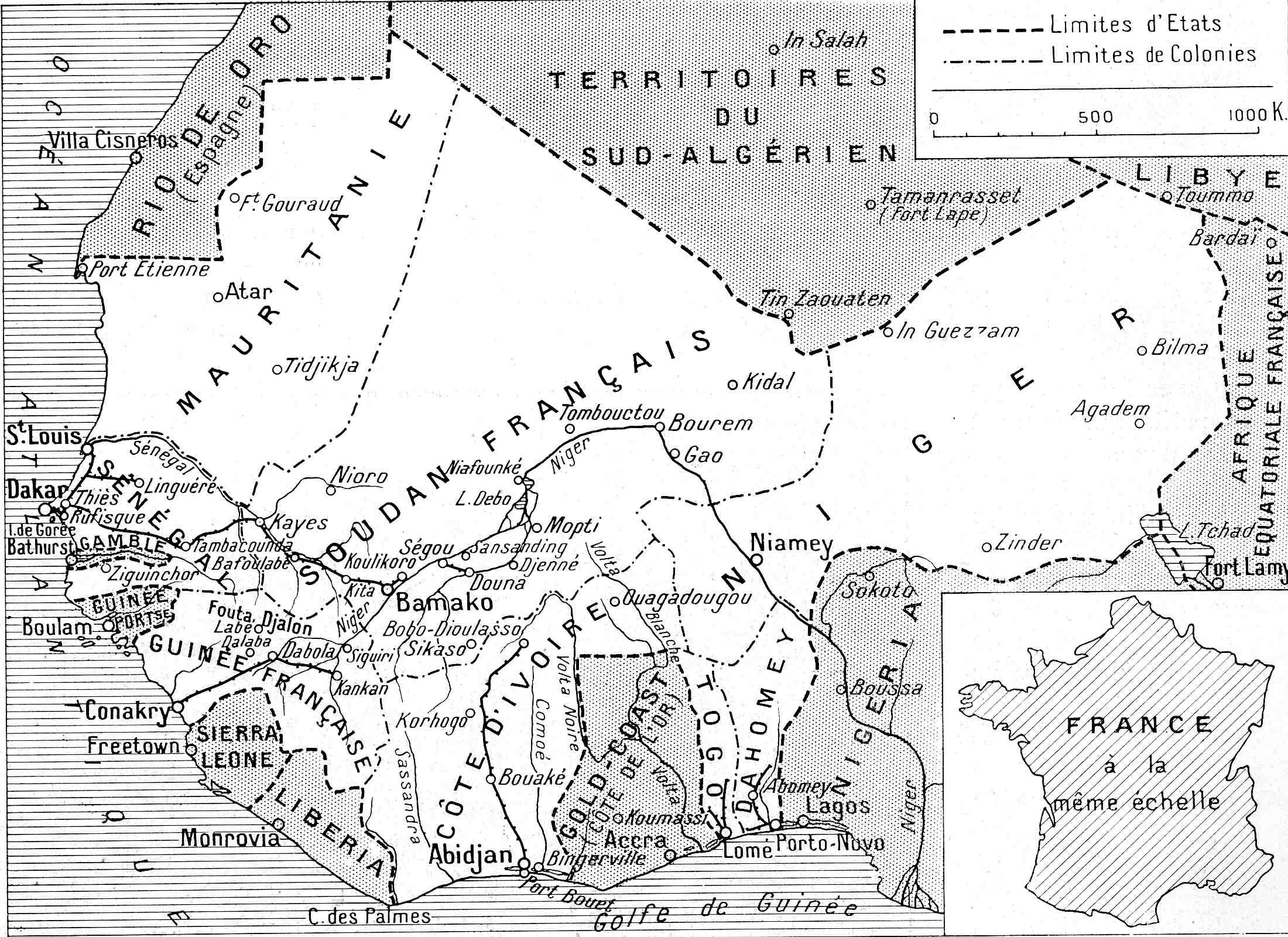
French West Africa, during the period when Burkina Faso was split out between surrounding colonies

As the movement for decolonisation grew in the post-Second World War era, France gradually granted more political rights and representation for its African territories, culminating in the granting of broad internal autonomy to each colony in 1958 within the framework of the French Community. In August 1960 both Niger and Upper Volta (renamed Burkina Faso in 1984) gained full independence, and their mutual frontier became an international one between two sovereign states. On 23 June 1964 the two new governments met and formally agreed to settle their shared border, however it appears no final arrangement came out of these discussions A full border demarcation remained incomplete until the late 1980s, however disputes about the interpretation of colonial-era boundary treaties prompted the two states to submit the dispute to the International Court of Justice in 2010. The ICJ subsequently ruled on the dispute in 2013, recommending some small territorial exchanges, which were accepted by both governments.

== Settlements ==
=== Burkina Faso ===
- Dembam
- Tamba
- Ouro Boulé
- Soffokèl
- Barbabouga
- Takatami
- Gabouga
- Kantchari
- Botou
- Kogori
- Garibonga

=== Niger ===
- Dolbèl
- Fatatako
- Boukari Koyré
- Fantio
- Manda
- Bangaré
- Tingou
- Bolsi
- Ouro Sawabé
- Tampéna
- Makalondi
- Alambaré

== Border crossings ==
There are several border crossings. The most frequented is the Sambalgou (BF)–Makalondi (Niger) crossing which lies on the main Ouagadougou-Niamey road.
