= On Visiting the Spot Where Captain Cook, and Sir Joseph Banks, First Landed in Botany Bay =

1822 poem by Barron Field

- by Barron Field
- Country: Australia
- Language: English
- Publisher: Sydney Gazette, and New South Wales Advertiser
- Publication date: 22 March 1822
- Lines: 14

Full text
- On Visiting the Spot Where Captain Cook, and Sir Joseph Banks, First Landed in Botany Bay at Wikisource

"On Visiting the Spot Where Captain Cook, and Sir Joseph Banks, First Landed in Botany Bay" is an 1822 poem by English-born Australian author Barron Field.

It was first published in The Sydney Gazette, and New South Wales Advertiser on 22 March 1822,and subsequently included in the poet's major collection and other Australian poetry anthologies.

The poem is also known by the title "A Sydney Sonnet".

== Synopsis ==
The poem calls for the placement of a tablet to commemorate the spot where James Cook and Joseph Banks landed at Botany Bay. It also notes that this is the spot where the crew "refreshed their ship" and where they buried seaman Forby Sutherland.

== Critical reception ==
In his essay "The Beginnings of Australian Poetry 1 : Editorial Notes" in Birth in 1920, Frederick T. Macartney noted the "best of the six poems that comprise the First Fruits is the sonnet on visiting the spot where Captain Cook and Sir Joseph Banks first landed in Botany Bay. It is like one of those oddly executed old colour-prints which preserve for us the scenes of the early colonial days."

== Publication history ==
After the poem's initial publication in The Sydney Gazette, and New South Wales Advertiser in 1822 it was reprinted as follows:

- First Fruits of Australian Poetry by Barron Field, George Howe, 1823 (2nd edition)
- Geographical Memoirs on New South Wales edited by Barron Field, John Murray, 1825
- The Sydney Morning Herald, 29 April 1863
- A Century of Australian Song edited by Douglas Sladen, Walter Scott Publishers, 1888
- The Australian Town and Country Journal, 26 January 1889
- Poets of Australia : An Anthology of Australian Verse edited by George Mackaness, Angus & Robertson, 1946
- An Anthology of Australian Verse edited by George Mackaness, Angus & Robertson, 1952
- Australian Verse from 1805 : A Continuum edited by Geoffrey Dutton, Rigby, 1976
- An Anthology of Australian Poetry to 1920 edited by John Kinsella, University of Western Australia Library, 2007
- The Puncher & Wattmann Anthology of Australian Poetry edited by John Leonard, Puncher & Wattmann, 2009
