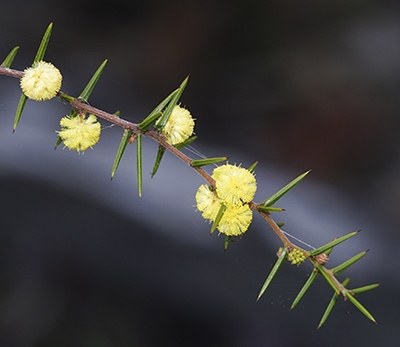
- In Blue Mountains National Park

Scientific classification
- Kingdom: Plantae
- Clade: Embryophytes
- Clade: Tracheophytes
- Clade: Angiosperms
- Clade: Eudicots
- Clade: Rosids
- Order: Fabales
- Family: Fabaceae
- Subfamily: Caesalpinioideae
- Clade: Mimosoid clade
- Genus: Acacia
- Species: A. asparagoides

Binomial name
- Acacia asparagoides A.Cunn.
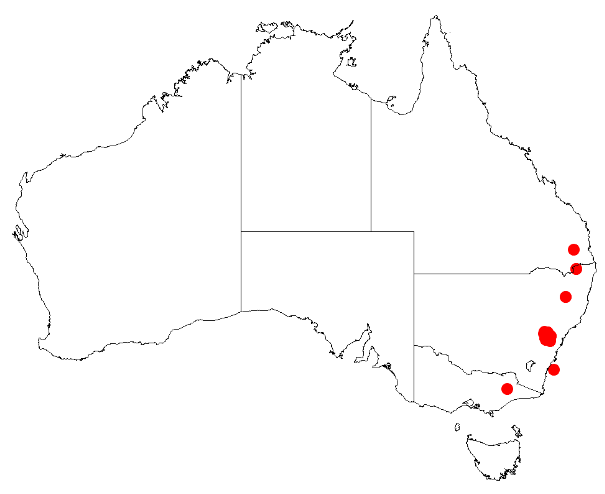
- Occurrence data from AVH

Synonyms
- Racosperma asparagoides (A.Cunn.) Pedley

= Acacia asparagoides =

Species of flowering plant

Acacia asparagoides is a species of flowering plant in the family Fabaceae and is endemic to a restricted area of south-eastern New South Wales. It is an erect or spreading shrub with sharply-pointed, more or less rigid, linear phyllodes, bright yellow flowers arranged in a spherical head of 15 to 30 in axils, and narrowly oblong and curved pods up to 40 mm (1.6 in) long.

== Description ==
Acacia asparagoides is an erect or spreading shrub that typically grows to a height of 0.3–2 m (1 ft 0 in – 6 ft 7 in). Its phyllodes are sharply-pointed, more or less rigid, narrowly triangular to linear, 8–20 mm (0.31–0.79 in) long and 1–2 mm (0.039–0.079 in) wide with stipules 1–2 mm (0.039–0.079 in) long at the base. The mid-vein is prominent, with a gland 0.5–2 mm (0.020–0.079 in) above the base. The flowers are bright yellow and borne in groups of 15 to 30 in a spherical head 3.5–5 mm (0.14–0.20 in) long in axils, on a peduncle 1–3 mm (0.039–0.118 in) long. Flowering mainly occurs from August to October and the fruit is a firmly papery, narrowly oblong, black, glabrous, curved pod 40 mm (1.6 in) long and 2.5–4 mm (0.098–0.157 in) wide. The seeds are oblong, about 3.5 mm (0.14 in) long.

== Taxonomy ==
Acacia asparagoides was first formally described in 1825 by the botanist Allan Cunningham in On the Botany of the Blue Mountains in Barron Field's book, Geographical Memoirs on New South Wales. The specific epithet (asparagoides) refers to the resemblance of the shrub to some species of asparagus.

== Distribution and habitat ==
This species of wattle is found between Newnes Junction and Lawson in the Blue Mountains where it grows in sandy soils on sandstone or granite in dry sclerophyll forest, less frequently in heathland.

== See also ==
- List of Acacia species
