= First Fruits of Australian Poetry =

1819 poetry collection by Barron Field

- Author: Barron Field
- Language: English
- Genre: Poetry collection
- Publisher: George Howe
- Publication date: 1819
- Publication place: Australia
- Media type: Print
- Pages: 9 pp.

First Fruits of Australian Poetry is a collection of Australian poetry by Barron Field, published by George Howe Publishers in Sydney, New South Wales, in 1819.

The collection contains 2 poems in the 1819 edition both published here for the first time. Later editions of the work would add further poems.

This book was the first volume of verse published in Australia.

== Publication history ==
The collection was re-issued as follows:

- 1823, R. Howe, Australia
- 1941, Richard Edwards & Roderick Shaw, Australia
- 1990, Mulini Press, Australia

== Contents ==
The 1819 edition contained the following poems:

- "Botany-Bay Flowers"
- "The Kangaroo"

The 1823 edition added the following poems:

- "On Reading the Controversy Between Lord Byron and Mr Bowles" (1823)
- "On Affixing a Tablet to the Memory of Captain Cook, and Sir Joseph Banks, Against the Rock of Their First Landing in Botany Bay" (1822)
- "On Visiting the Spot Where Captain Cook, and Sir Joseph Banks, First Landed in Botany Bay" (1822)

The 1941 edition was a reprint of the 1823 edition containing all five poems, and the 1990 edition was a reprint of the original 1819 edition with only two poems.

== Critical reception ==
Charles Lamb in The Examiner newspaper in London pointed out that the first poem in the collection used some material from Midsummer Night's Dream. He went on "The thefts are indeed so open and palpable, that we must recur to our first surmise, that the author must be some unfortunate wight, sent on his travels for plagiarism of a more serious complexion."

An anonymous reviewer in The Sydney Gazette and New South Wales Advertiser was not at all impressed with the poet's work. "A wise man in love, eighty imitating eighteen, have each of them a spice of nature in them, but the raven to imagine its croaking equal to the ravishing strains of the nightingale is truly monstrous, yet such is the preposterous posit on in which Barron Field, Esq. F. L. S. late Judge of the Supreme Court of New South Wales, has placed himself, by his very gratuitous assumption of poetic talent."

The Oxford Companion to Australian Literature states that "in spite of some ridiculing of the colonial scene, [these] are among the first poems to evoke the Australian environment."

Thomas Ford and Justin Clemens, in Cordite Poetry Review note that Barron Field was responsible "for the first articulation of the doctrine that later came to be known as terra nullius", the concept "that Aboriginal people, at least in the eyes of the law, simply didn’t exist". They continued: "Through close readings of the six poems that made up Field's book from its second edition in 1823 – the first edition of 1819 contained just two poems – we [have] argued that, far from being merely supplemental to his legal reformulation of the basis of colonisation, poetry was in fact instrumental to Field’s program to re-establish New South Wales on a new constitutional footing premised counterfactually on the non-existence of Aboriginal societies."

== See also ==
- 1819 in literature
