= Kantchari Department =

Coordinates: 12°28′43″N 1°30′44″E

Kantchari
- Department
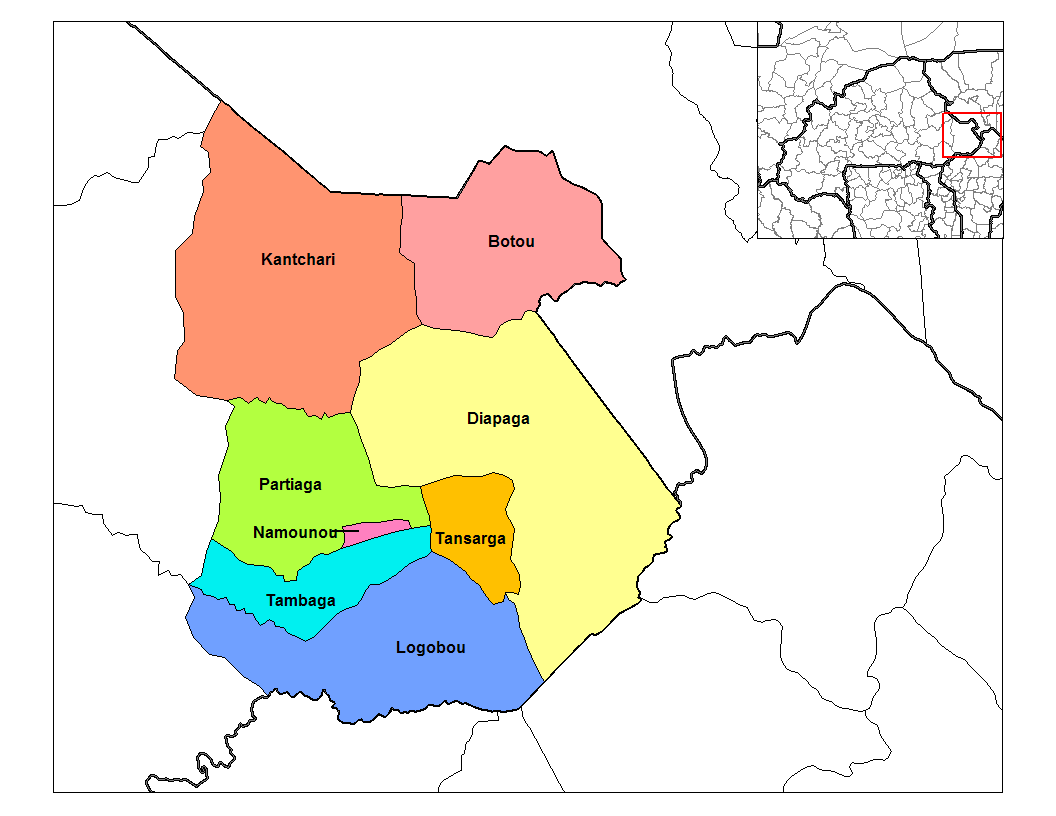
- Kantchari Department location in the province
- Country: Burkina Faso
- Province: Tapoa Province

Area
  - Total: 1,392 sq mi (3,605 km^{2})

Population
  - Total: 109,487
  - Density: 78.66/sq mi (30.37/km^{2})
- Time zone: UTC+0 (GMT 0)

Kantchari is a department or commune of Tapoa Province in eastern Burkina Faso. Its capital is the town of Kantchari.
