= Namounou Department =

Coordinates: 11°51′38″N 1°41′57″E

- Department
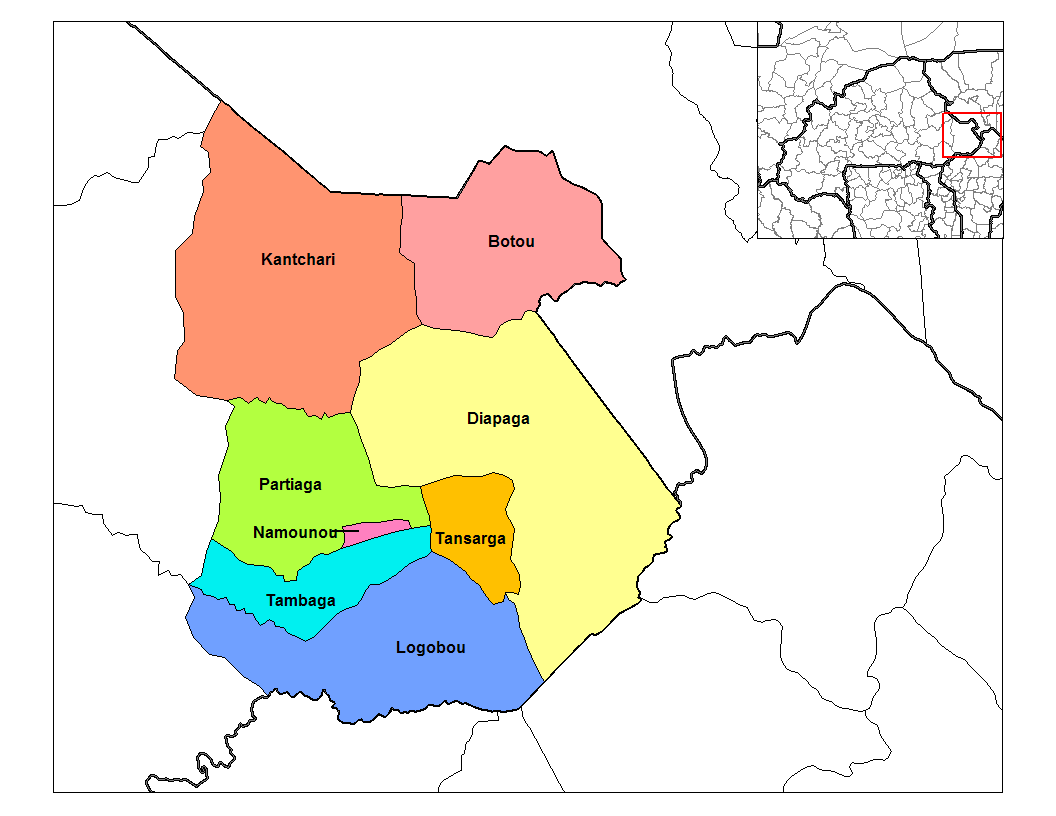
- Namounou Department location in the province
- Country: Burkina Faso
- Province: Tapoa Province
- Time zone: UTC+0 (GMT 0)

Namounou is a department or commune of Tapoa Province in eastern Burkina Faso. Its capital lies at the town of Namounou.
