= Partiaga Department =

Partiaga
- Department
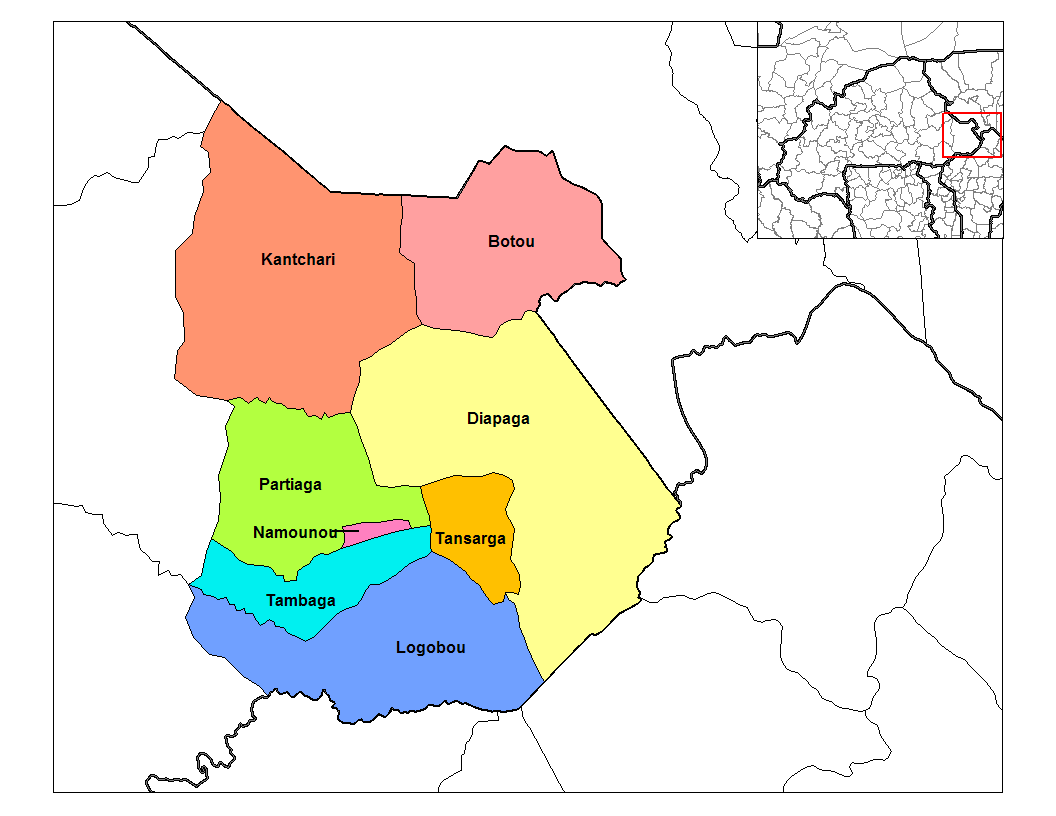
- Partiaga Department location in the province
- Coordinates: 11.9333°N 1.6167°E
- Country: Burkina Faso
- Province: Tapoa Province

Area
  - Total: 634 sq mi (1,641 km^{2})

Population (2019 census)
  - Total: 101,439
  - Density: 160.1/sq mi (61.82/km^{2})
- Time zone: UTC+0 (GMT 0)

Partiaga is a department or commune of Tapoa Province in eastern Burkina Faso. Its capital is the town of Partiaga.

The most recent census conducted in 2019 reports a population of 101,439.
