= Tapoa River =

River in Burkina Faso and Niger

Coordinates: 12°32′54″N 2°31′21″E

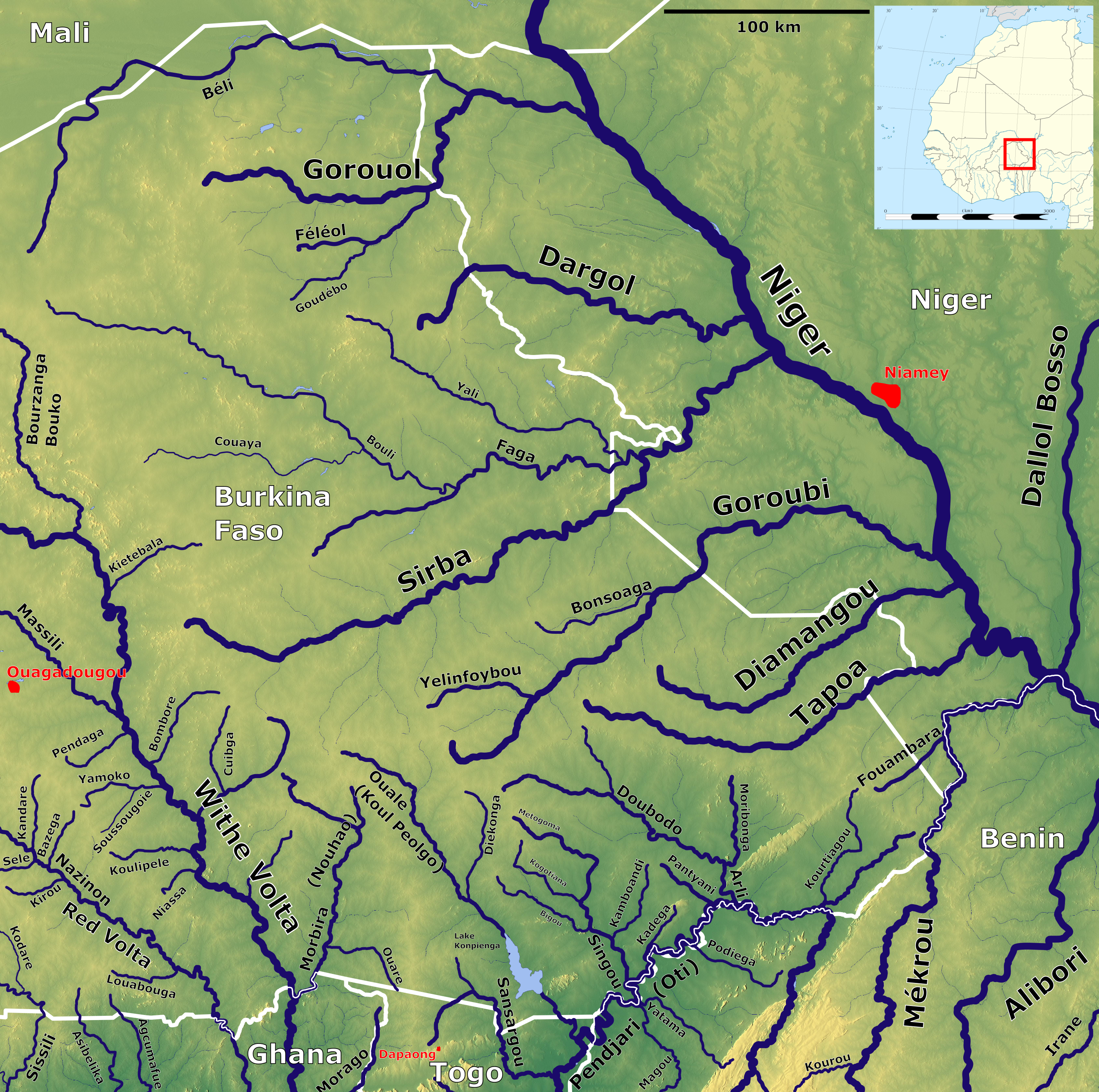
West Burkina Faso with the Tapoa in the Center right

The Tapoa River is a tributary of the Niger River. It flows through the Tapoa Province in Burkina Faso and forms a small part of the international border between Burkina Faso and Niger, after which it flows into the Niger River in southwestern Niger.
