= Piccione =

Piccione is Italian surname. Notable people with the surname include:

- Alessandra Piccione, Italian-Canadian screenwriter
- Anthony Piccione (1939–2001), American poet
- Clivio Piccione (born 1984), Monegasque racing driver
- Elisa Cusma Piccione (born 1981), Italian middle-distance runner
- Teena Piccione, American politician and businesswoman

== See also ==
- Piccioni
- Pidgeon (surname)
- Columba
