= Kangaroo (poem) =

1819 poem by Barron Field

- by Barron Field
- Country: Australia
- Language: English
- Publisher: George Howe
- Publication date: 1819

Full text
- Kangaroo (poem) at Wikisource

"Kangaroo" is an 1819 poem by English-born Australian author Barron Field.

It was first published in the author's collection First Fruits of Australian Poetry, the first book of poetry published in Australia.

== Synopsis ==
The Oxford Companion to Australian Literature states that the poem "depicts the animal as an Antipodean oddity, an anomaly of the animal world yet typical of the equally strange Australian landscape.".

== Critical reception ==
The Oxford Literary History of Australia states: "Field's poetry laments the lack of either classical or familiar poetic associations in the alien environment, a lament that was mocked at the time and has been since for its pretension, but which has also been read as a witty parody of colonial literary pretentiousness."

In The Cambridge Companion to Australian Poetry Michael Farrell noted that "The historical precedence of "The Kangaroo," as well as in anxiety over Australia's rhyme with failure as an analogy to the colonial enterprise itself, marks it as a benchmark poem for subsequent settler poems."

== Publication history ==
After the poem's initial publication in First Fruits of Australian Poetry in 1819 it was reprinted as follows:

- The Examiner (London, UK), 16 January 1820, p40
- Geographical Memoirs on New South Wales edited by Barron Field, John Murray, 1825
- The Gleaner, 26 April 1827
- Once a Month, vol. 1 no. 4, 15 October 1884
- An Animal Anthology edited by Hal Missingham, Shepherd Press, 1948
- The Legend of the Coming of the First Kangaroo by Lindsay A. Dane and Barron Field, Truesdell Press, 1948
- Bards in the Wilderness : Australian Colonial Poetry to 1920 edited by Adrian Mitchell and Brian Elliott, Nelson, 1970
- A Treasury of Colonial Poetry, Currawong, 1982
- The New Oxford Book of Australian Verse edited by Les Murray, Oxford University Press, 1986
- Two Centuries of Australian Poetry edited by Mark O’Connor, Oxford University Press, 1988
- The Poet's Discovery : Nineteenth Century Australia in Verse edited by Richard Douglas Jordan and Peter Pierce, Melbourne University Press, 1990
- The Penguin Book of 19th Century Australian Literature edited by Michael Ackland, Penguin, 1993
- Classic Australian Verse edited by Maggie Pinkney, Five Mile Press, 2001
- Our Country : Classic Australian Poetry : From Colonial Ballads to Paterson & Lawson edited by Michael Cook, Little Hills Press, 2002
- An Anthology of Australian Poetry to 1920 edited by John Kinsella, University of Western Australia Library, 2007
- Two Centuries of Australian Poetry edited by Kathrine Bell, Gary Allen, 2007
- The Penguin Anthology of Australian Poetry edited by John Kinsella, Penguin, 2009
- Macquarie PEN Anthology of Australian Literature edited by Nicholas Jose, Kerryn Goldsworthy, Anita Heiss, David McCooey, Peter Minter, Nicole Moore, and Elizabeth Webby, Allen and Unwin, 2009
