= Tambaga Department =

Coordinates: 11°48′N 1°44′E

Tambaga
- Department
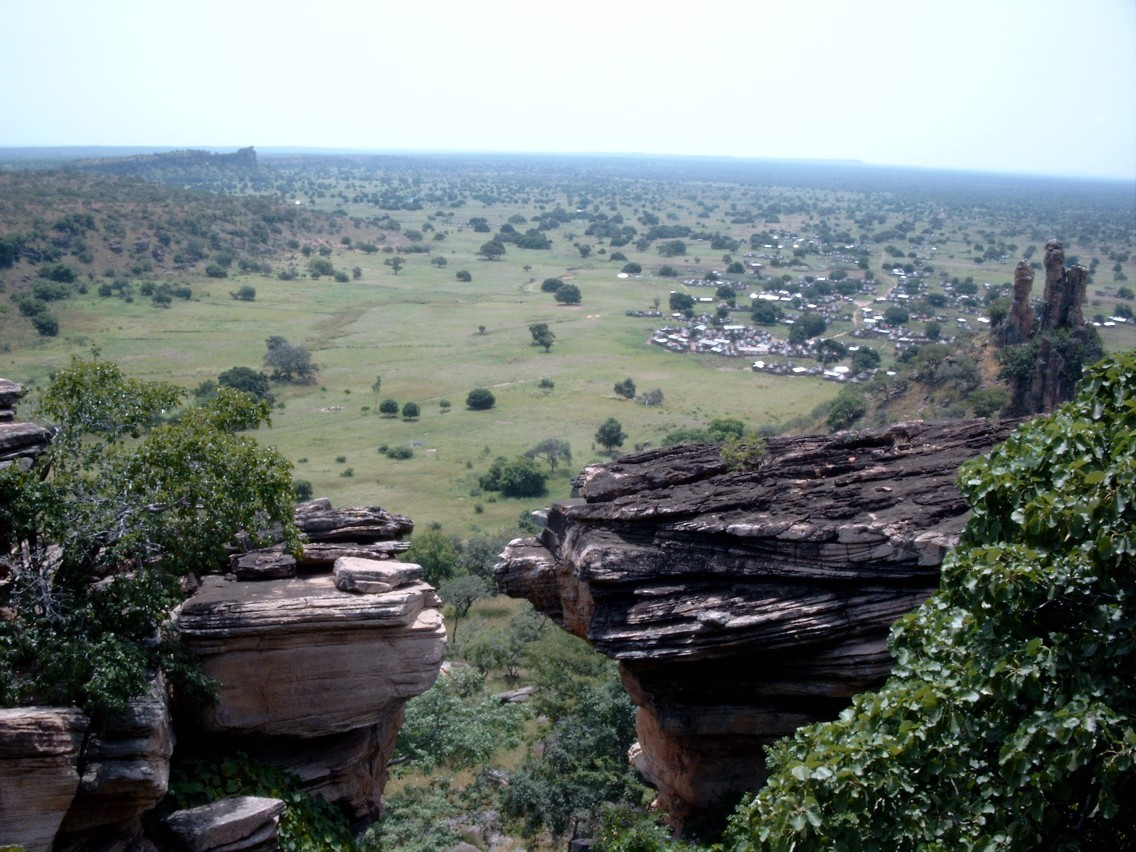
- Panorama near Tambaga town

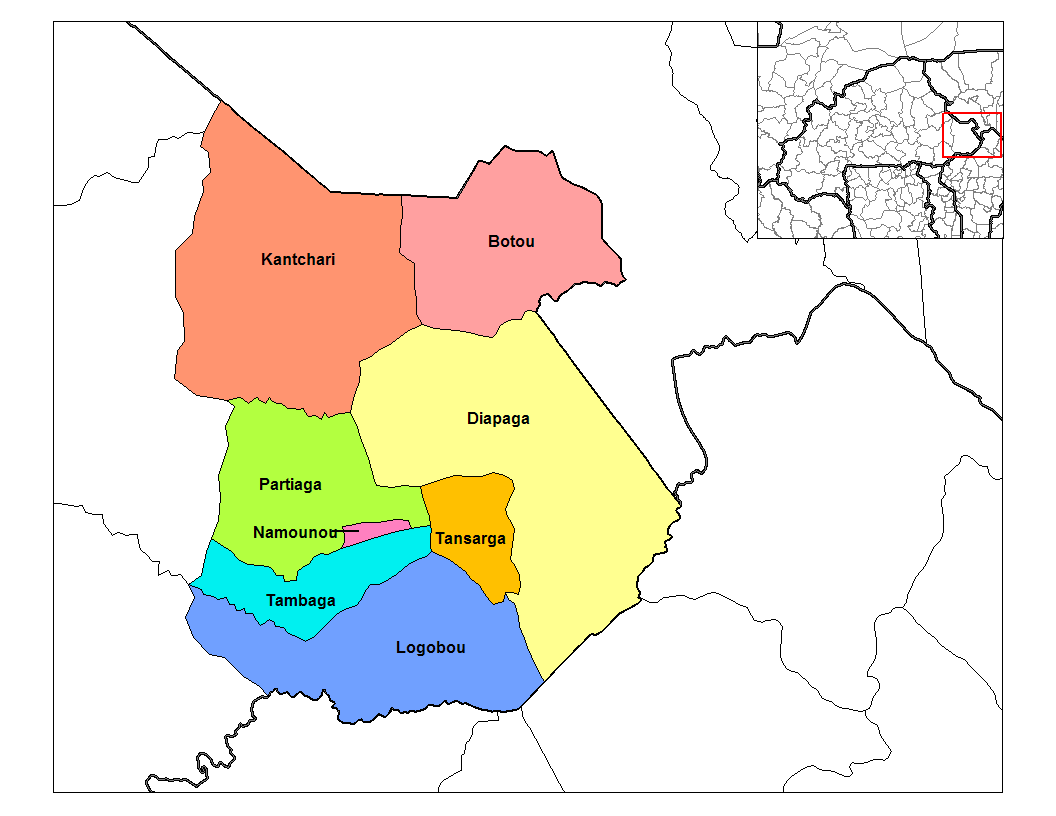
- Tambaga Department location in the province
- Country: Burkina Faso
- Province: Tapoa Province

Area
  - Total: 304 sq mi (787 km^{2})

Population (2019 census)
  - Total: 64,825
  - Density: 213/sq mi (82.4/km^{2})
- Time zone: UTC+0 (GMT 0)

Tambaga is a department or commune of Tapoa Province in eastern Burkina Faso. Its capital is the town of Tambaga.
