= Tambaga =

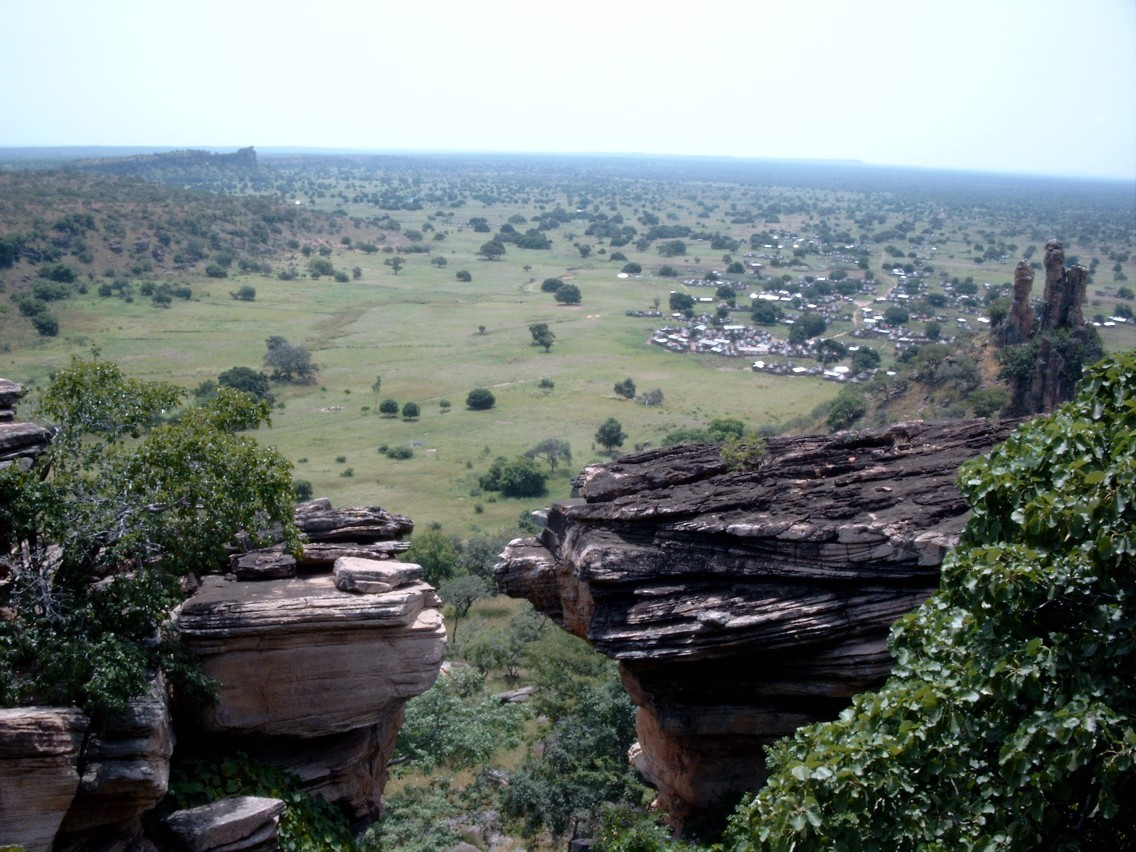
- Panorama of Tambarga

- Location in Burkina Faso
- Coordinates: 11°47′45″N 1°44′30″E
- Country: Burkina Faso
- Region: Est Region
- Province: Tapoa Province
- Department: Tambaga Department

Population (2005 est.)
  - Total: 28,633

Tambaga or Tambarga is a town and seat of the Tambaga Department in Tapoa Province in south-eastern Burkina Faso. As of 2005, the village has a population of 28,633 although current estimates are nearer 36,000.
