= Botou Department =

Coordinates: 12.6624°N 2.0579°E

Botou
- Department
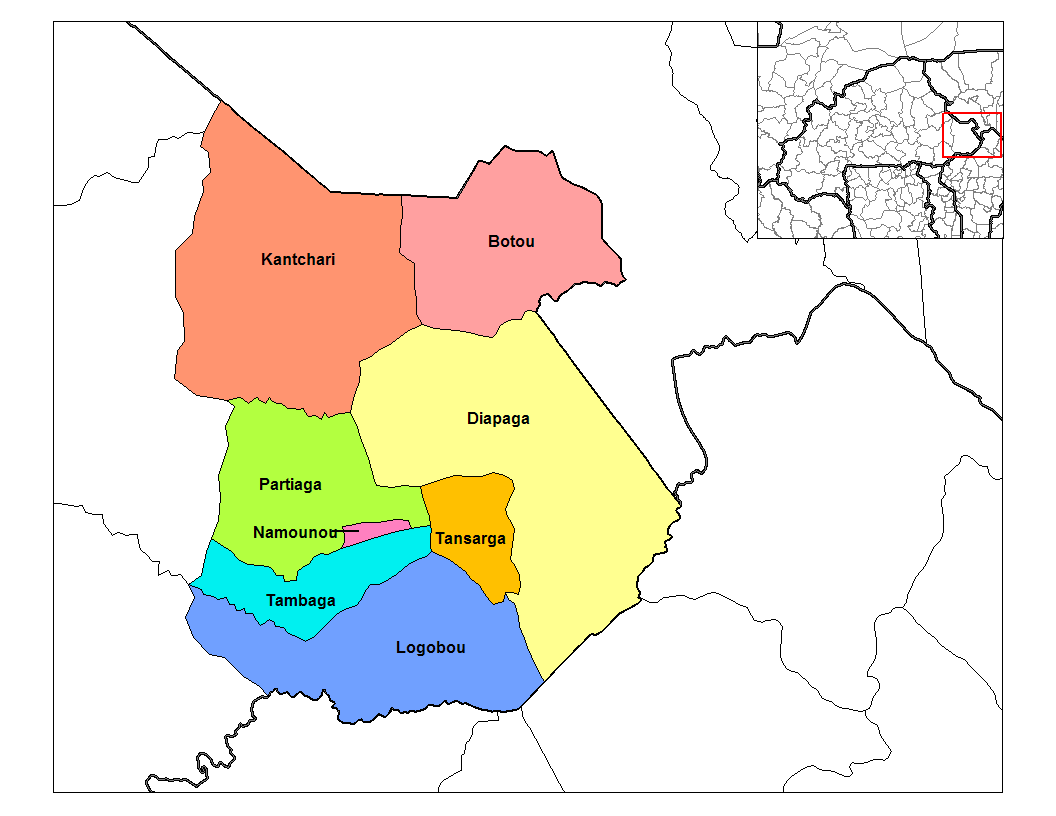
- Diapaga Department location in the province
- Country: Burkina Faso
- Province: Tapoa Province

Area
  - Total: 690 sq mi (1,787 km^{2})

Population (2019 census)
  - Total: 81,128
  - Density: 117.6/sq mi (45.40/km^{2})
- Time zone: UTC+0 (GMT 0)

Botou is a department or commune of Tapoa Province in eastern Burkina Faso. Its capital is the town of Botou. The department constitutes a panhandle that stretches into Niger.
