= Tansarga Department =

Coordinates: 11°52′29″N 1°52′17″E

Tansarga
- Department
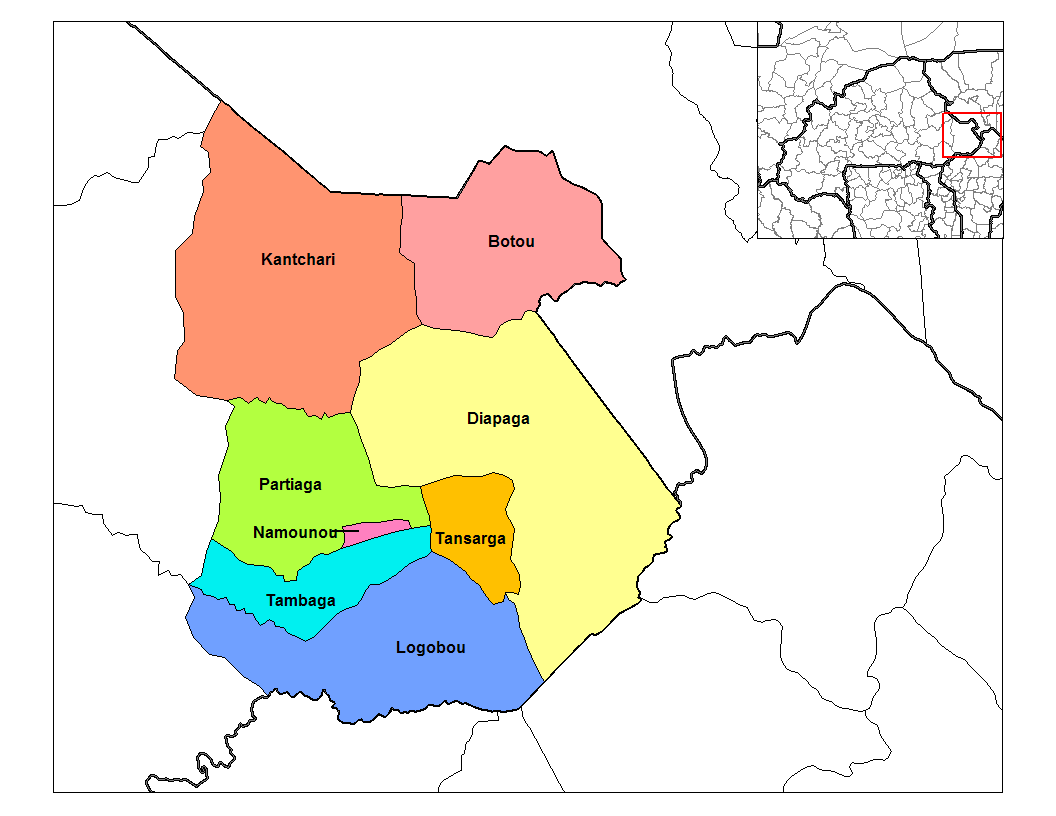
- Tansarga Department location in the province
- Country: Burkina Faso
- Province: Tapoa Province

Area
  - Total: 230 sq mi (590 km^{2})

Population
  - Total: 62,987
  - Density: 280/sq mi (110/km^{2})
- Time zone: UTC+0 (GMT 0)

Tansarga is a department or commune of Tapoa Province in eastern Burkina Faso. Its capital is the town of Tansarga.
