= Diapaga Department =

Coordinates: 12.0670°N 1.7830°E

Diapaga
- Department
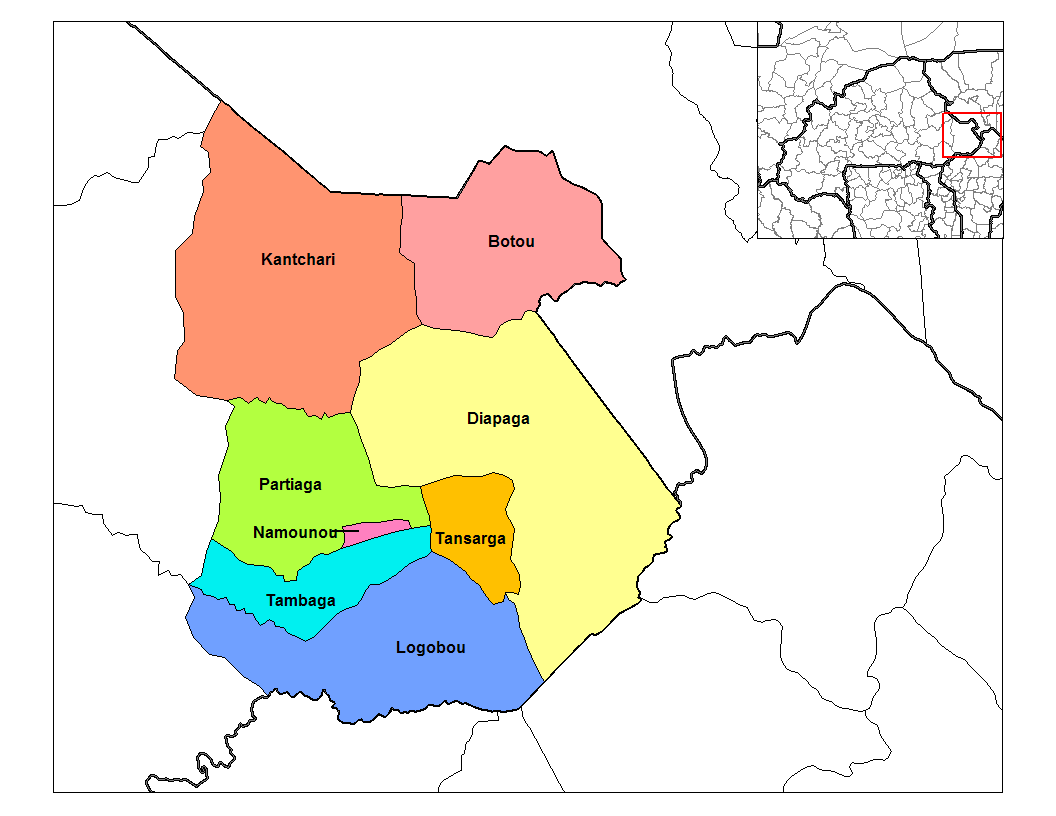
- Diapaga Department location in the province
- Country: Burkina Faso
- Province: Tapoa Province

Area
  - Department: 1,493 sq mi (3,866 km^{2})

Population (2019 census)
  - Department: 58,930
  - Density: 39.48/sq mi (15.24/km^{2})
  - Urban: 15,511
- Time zone: UTC+0 (GMT 0)

Diapaga is a department or commune of Tapoa Province in eastern Burkina Faso. Its capital is the town of Diapaga.
