= Logobou Department =

Coordinates: 11°38′01″N 1°40′05″E

Logobou
- Department
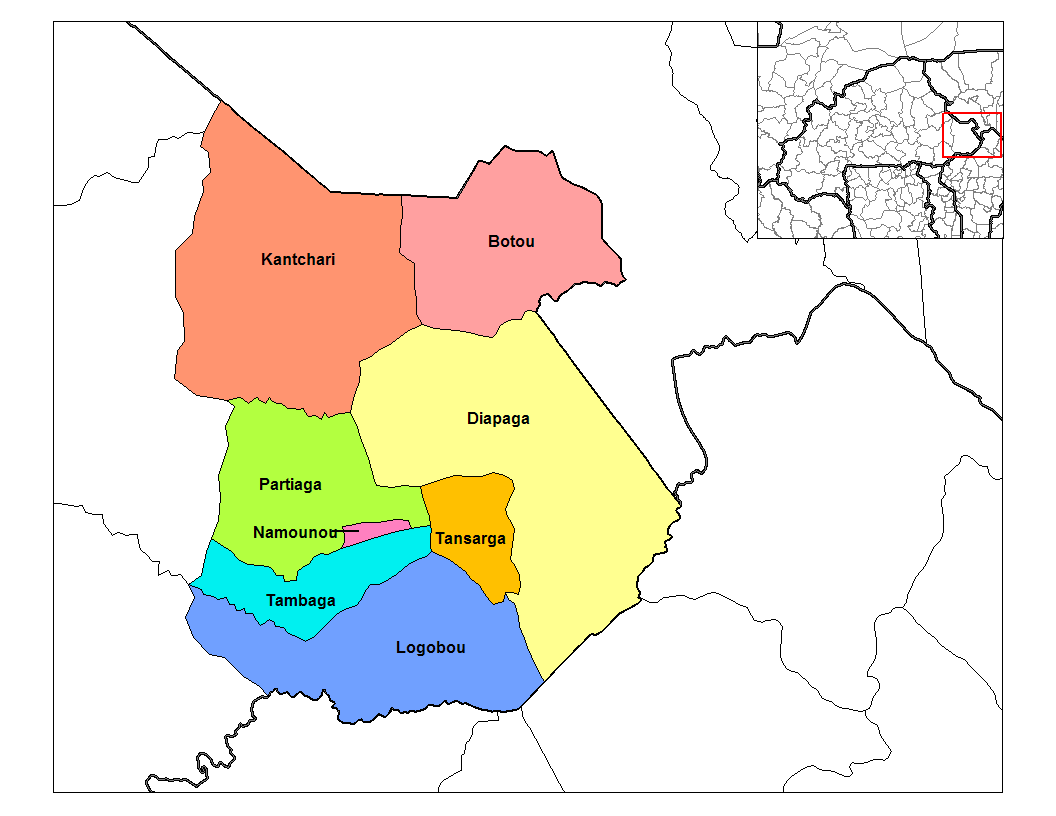
- Logobou Department location in the province
- Country: Burkina Faso
- Province: Tapoa Province

Area
  - Total: 937 sq mi (2,426 km^{2})

Population (2019 census)
  - Total: 97,016
  - Density: 103.6/sq mi (39.99/km^{2})
- Time zone: UTC+0 (GMT 0)

Logobou is a department or commune of Tapoa Province in eastern Burkina Faso. Its capital is the town of Logobou.
