= Botou, Tapoa =

Botou
- Location in Burkina Faso
- Coordinates: 12°39′36″N 2°03′13″E
- Country: Burkina Faso
- Region: Est Region
- Province: Tapoa Province
- Department: Botou Department

Population (2005 est.)
  - Total: 1,173

Botou is a town in the Botou Department of Tapoa Province in eastern Burkina Faso. The town has a population of 1,173.
