= Flag planting =

Action taken to assert territorial claims or one's victory

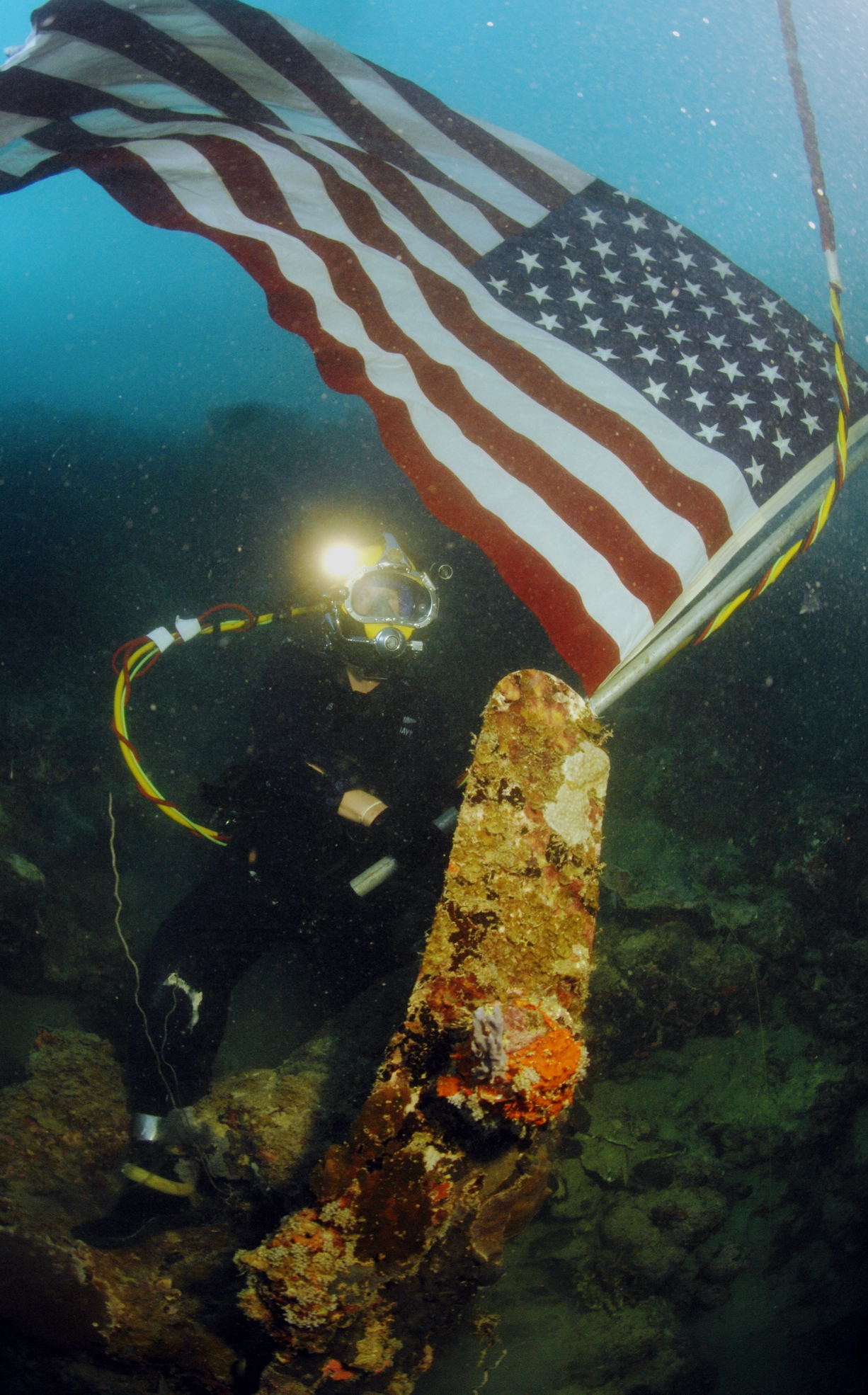
A JPAC diver planting a flag on the site where an American World War II military aircraft crashed into the Pacific Ocean

Flag planting is a symbolic act of placing a flag at some place. It is may be done as a means to assert territorial claims in military or geopolitical situations, sometimes symbolically, or as a commemoration. It has also become a common rivalry incident in college football in the United States.

== In war ==
World War II had multiple notable flag planting incidents, including those by American soldiers on Iwo Jima, by Finnish soldiers on the Three-Country Cairn, and by Soviet soldiers over the Reichstag. The capture of Umm al-Rashrāsh (modern day Eilat) in the 1948 Arab–Israeli War was marked by the raising and planting of the Ink Flag.

During the Russo-Ukrainian war, a phenomenon, and the corresponding neologism, have arisen: flagotyk or flagovtyk (Russian: флаготык, флаговтык, Ukrainian: флаговтик), literally "flag sticking", commonly translated to as "flag planting". A small military squad penetrates the territory of a populated place under the control of the opposite force, plants a flag, makes photos and videos, and then quickly retreats. The main purposes are propaganda and the exaggeration of the military advances before the upper command. Another popular form of flagovtyk is dropping a flag from a copter. An early flag planting episode occurred on July 7, 2022, on Snake Island, which was occupied and then abandoned by Russian forces. After that a Ukrainian squad landed on the island for several hours to plant a flag.

=== Gallery ===
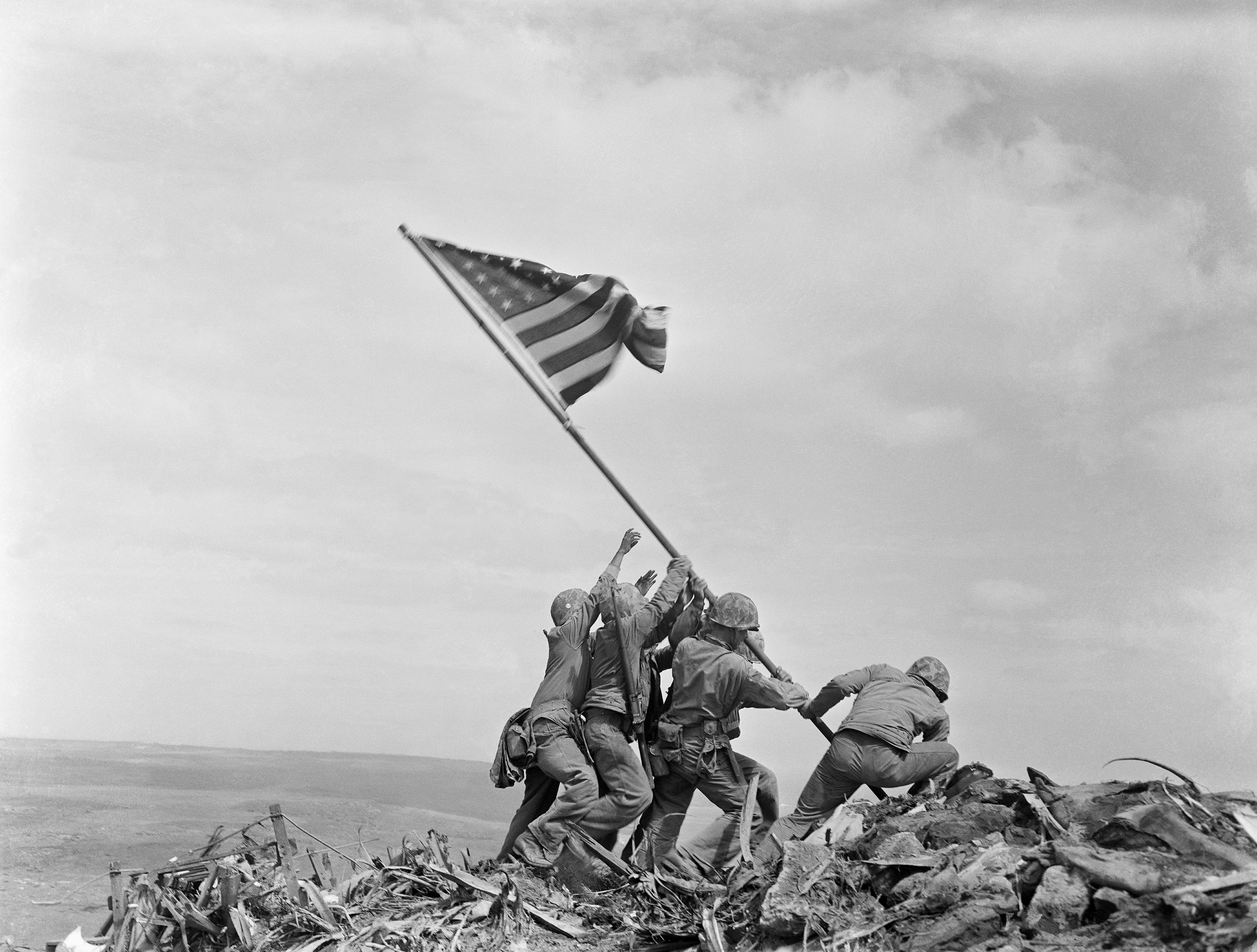
Raising the Flag on Iwo Jima

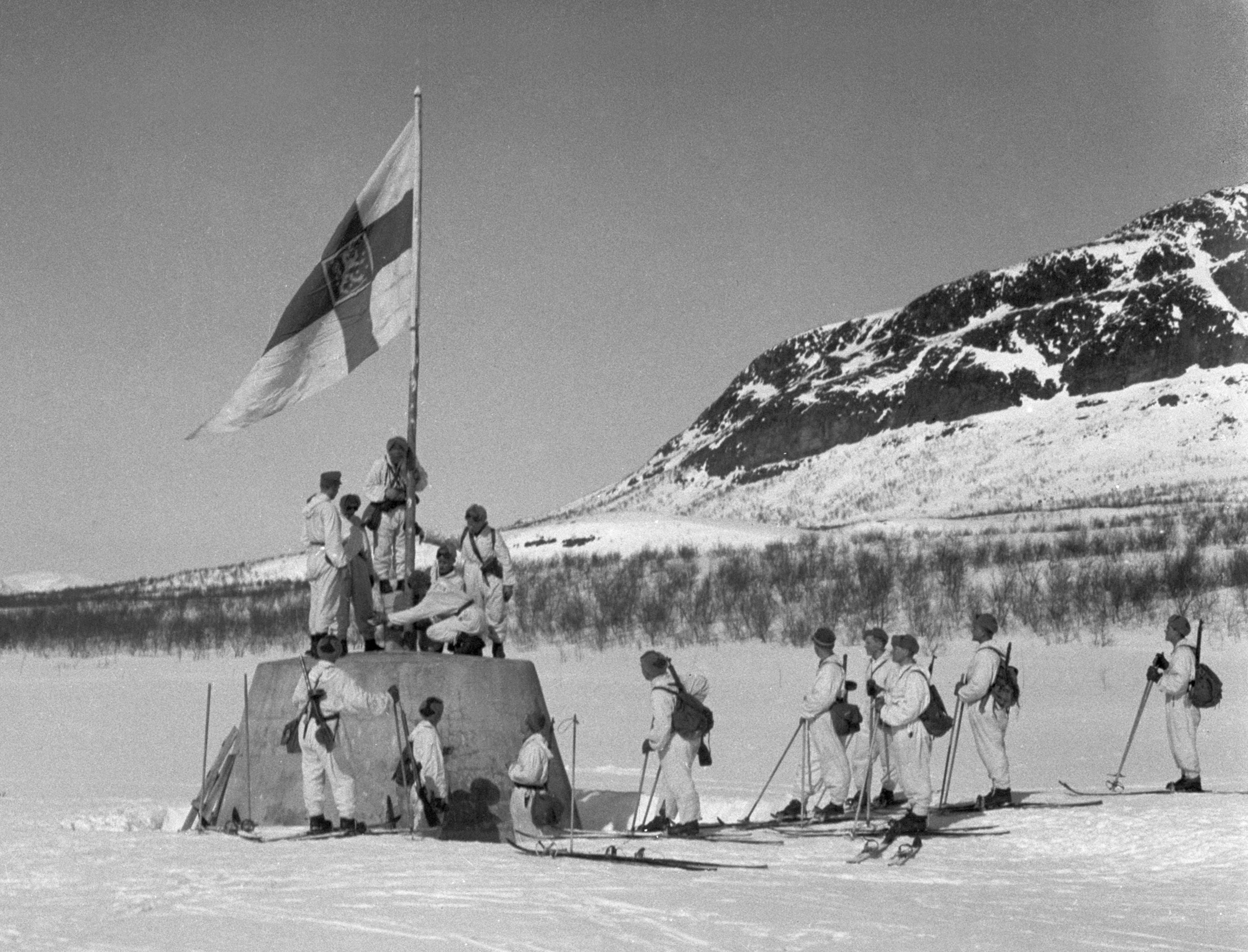
Raising the Flag on the Three-Country Cairn

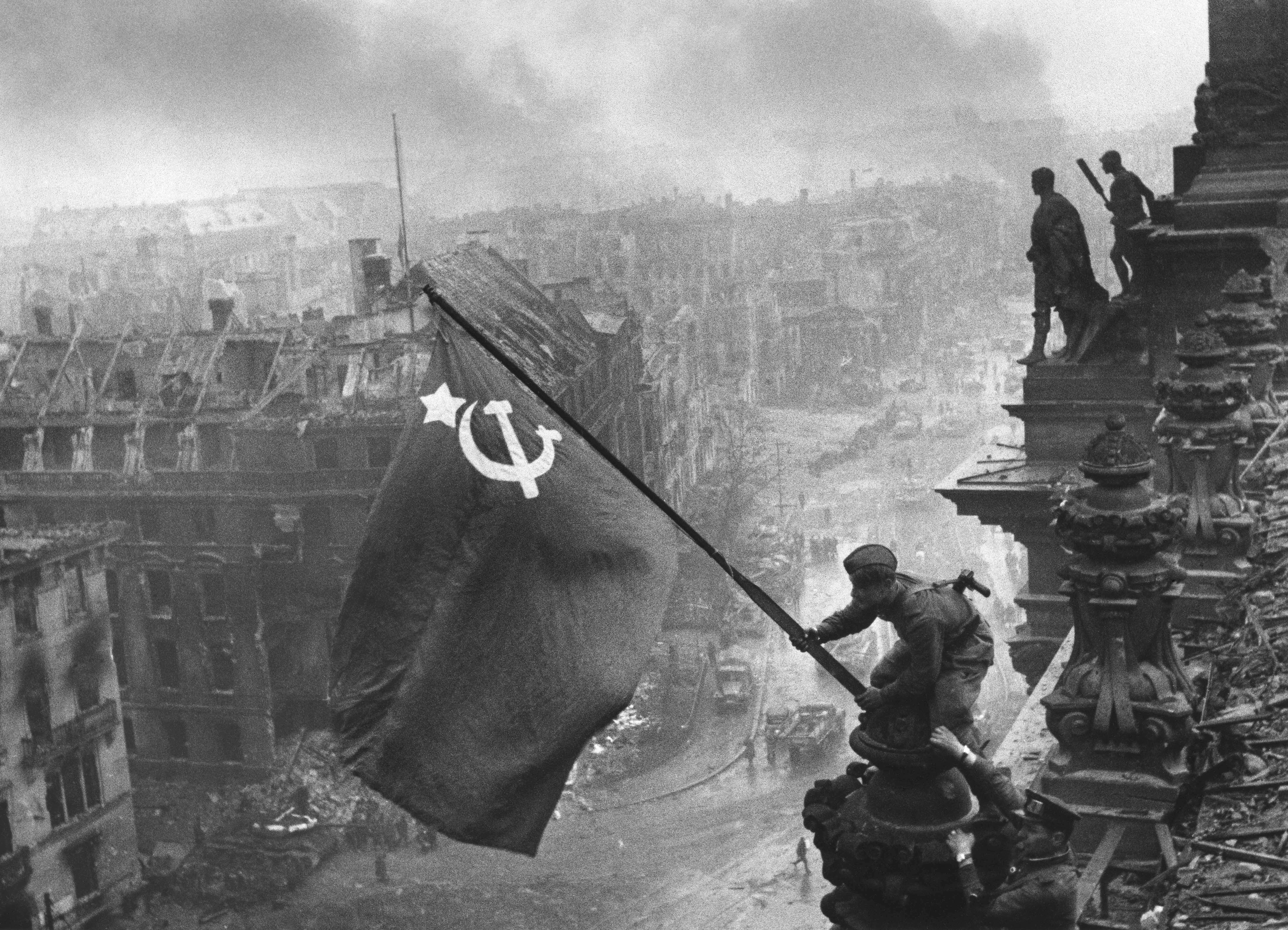
Raising a Flag over the Reichstag

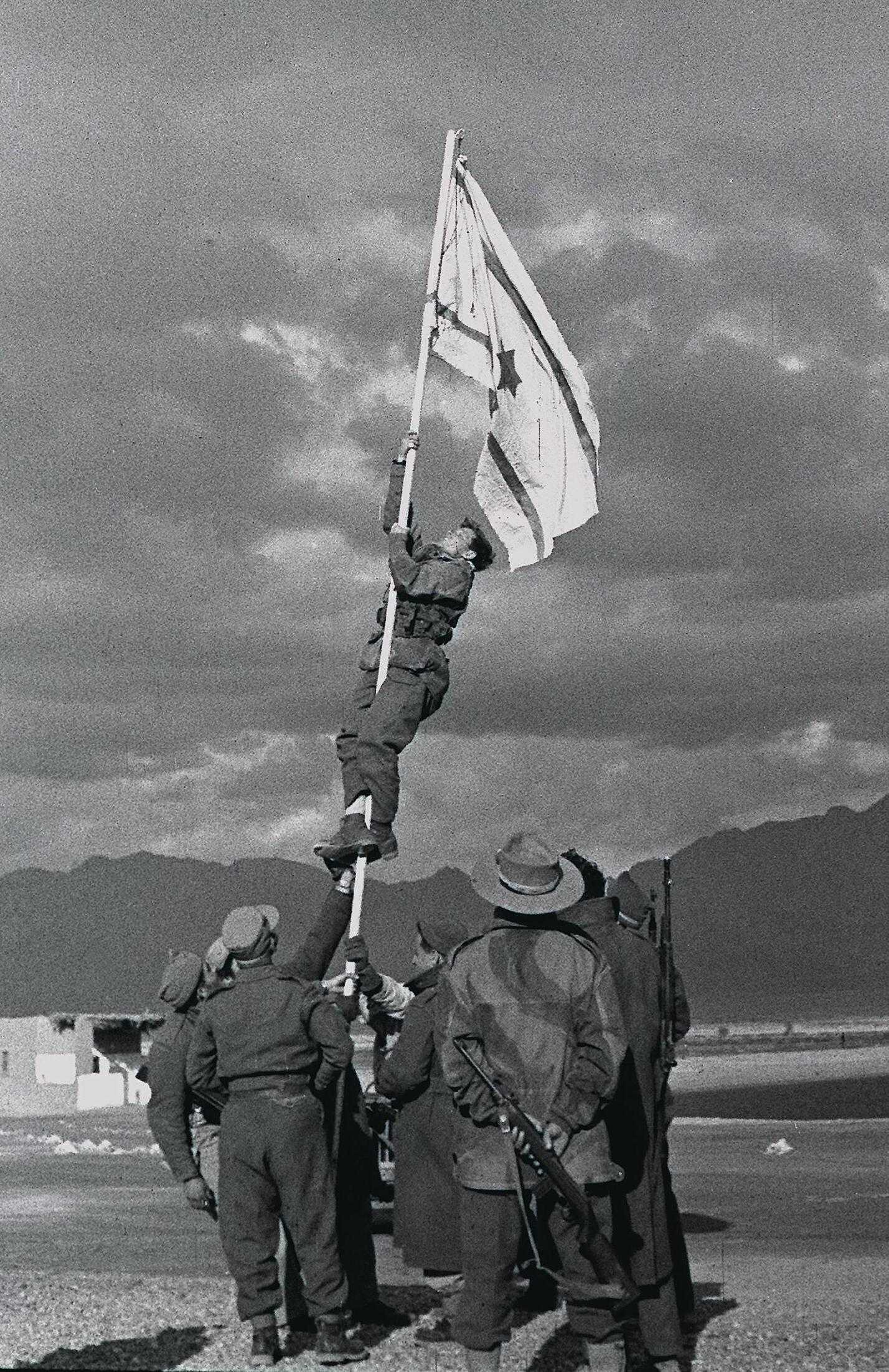
Raising of the Ink Flag

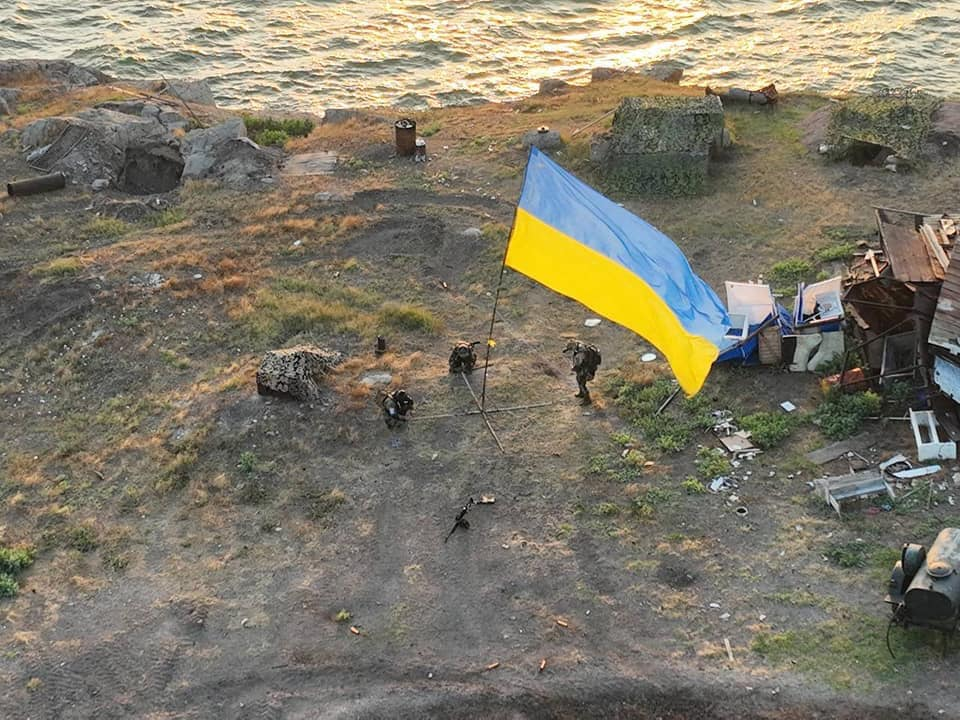
Temporary flag planting on Snake Island

== In college football ==
Flag planting incidents occurred, but were relatively infrequent, during the 2000s and 2010s. These included Michigan State players planting their flag on Notre Dame's field in 2005.

In 2017, then Oklahoma quarterback Baker Mayfield planted a flag on the Ohio State "Block O."

Much discourse surrounded flag planting following the 2024 season's rivalry week, with Michigan's upset road win over Ohio State and their subsequent flag planting on the latter's field drawing the same attention as Mayfield's act did. Following the 2024 incidents, Mayfield stated "College football is meant to have rivalries. That's like the Big 12 banning the 'horns down' signal. Just let the boys play". Former college football head coach Nick Saban conversely called flag planting "disrespectful" and "bad for the game". The incidents led to Ohio state Representative Josh Williams proposing the O.H.I.O Sportsmanship Act, which would make sports planting a felony in Ohio; Williams stated that "Behavior that incites violent brawls and puts our law enforcement officers in danger has no place on the football field". That proposal was later shot down following the Buckeyes national title take season.

== In scientific missions ==
During the Apollo program, American flags were erected on the lunar surface, the first one on July 21 UTC, 1969. The Lunar Flag Assembly was the specific kit designed for this purpose.

Russia performed a crewed descent to the North Pole's ocean floor in 2007, dubbed Arktika 2007, in which explorers planted a rust-proof titanium metal Russian flag.
