= Ernesto Picchioni =

Italian serial killer and criminal

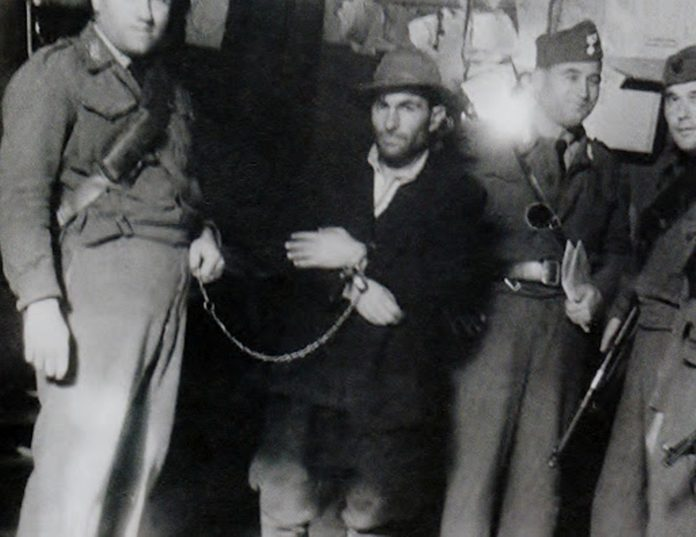
- Born: 1900; Ascrea, Italy
- Died: 9 September 1967 (aged 66–67); Porto Azzurro, Italy
- Other name: "The Monster of Nerola"
- Conviction: Murder
- Penalty: Two life sentences plus 26 years

Details
- Victims: 4–16
- Span of crimes: 1949 (known) –
- Country: Italy
- Date apprehended: 12 March 1949

Ernesto Picchioni (1900–9 September 1967), nicknamed The Monster of Nerola was an Italian serial killer and criminal, responsible for 4 to 16 homicides committed in the town of Nerola.

== Biography ==
Born in 1900 in Ascrea in the province of Rieti, he moved to Nerola in the Rome province (40 km away from Rome) in 1944 in a dilapidated house with his wife Angela Lucarelli and their four children. To the Carabinieri who asked how he got by, he replied that he "sells snails". In 1946 he served four months in prison for assaulting the owner of the land on which he lived illegally with a stone to the head. On the ground near his house were found corpses of dogs, the remains of dismantled bicycles and some corpses, and two other bodies around the village (that of a thirteen-year-old and an old man), but they were not traced to Picchioni due to lack of evidence.

After the arrest he was taken to a maximum-security cell at the Civitavecchia prison; he was later sentenced to two life sentences and 26 years in prison on March 12, 1949. His only defence was an unlikely political motive for his crimes. After attempting to attack Pope John XXIII during a visit to the prison, he was taken to the maximum-security prison in Porto Azzurro on Elba Island where he died of a cardiac arrest in 1967 at the age of 67. He never received any visits from relatives in prison. In fact, he claimed that he would kill them if he was them. The daughters Carolina and Gabriella were adopted after the arrest of their father in 1952 by the entrepreneur Robert Wilbraham Fitz Aucher, benefactor and king of the steel, receiving a legacy of 2 million dollars.

== In popular culture ==
In the film Toto vs. the Four, the Neapolitan actor mentions the name that the media gave to the murderer, turning to Aldo Fabrizi when he asks for the address of a burglar to help him open a broken lock; in response, Toto replies: "So when he has to pull the neck of the hen, is he the monster of Salaria?"

The story of Our Lady of the White Shadows by Ennio Flaiano in inspired by Picchioni.

== See also ==
- List of serial killers by country
- List of serial killers by number of victims

== Bibliography ==
- Armati C., Selvetella Y., Roma Criminale, Newton & Compton, Roma, 2005.
