= Tapoa Province =

Coordinates: 12°05′N 1°48′E

Tapoa
- Province
- Location in Burkina Faso

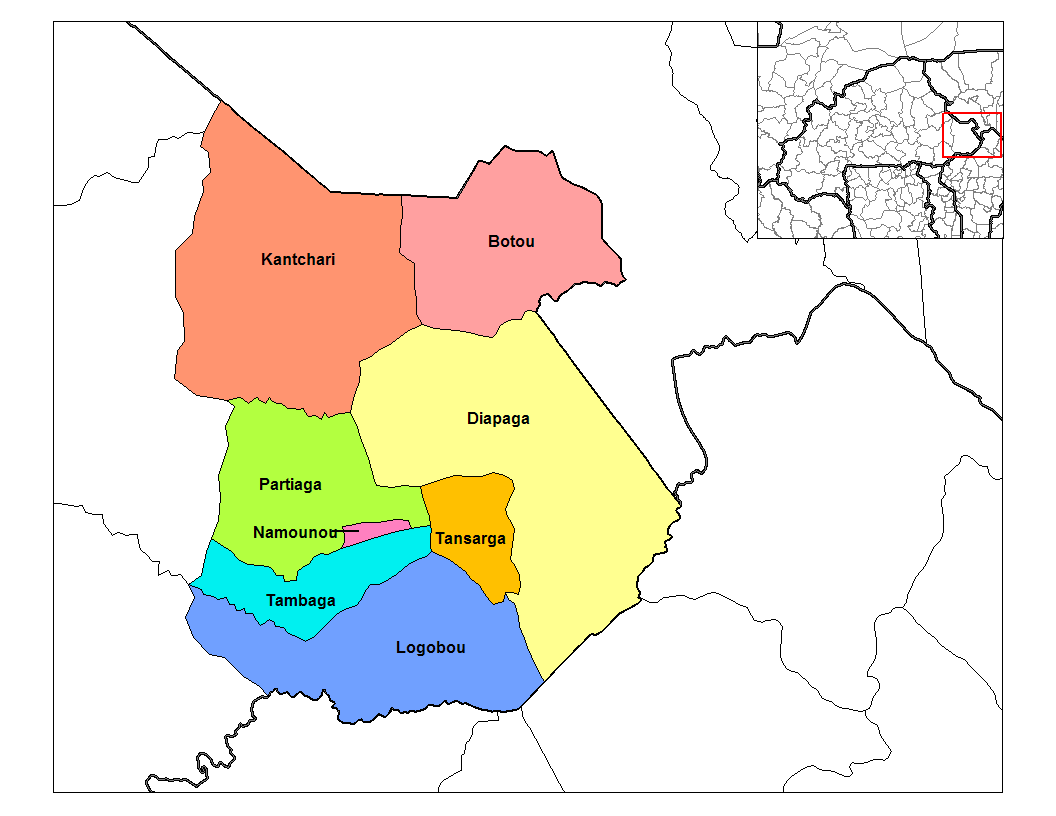
- Provincial map of its departments
- Country: Burkina Faso
- Region: Est Region
- Capital: Diapaga

Area
  - Province: 14,572 km^{2} (5,626 sq mi)

Population (2019 census)
  - Province: 605,110
  - Density: 41.526/km^{2} (107.55/sq mi)
  - Urban: 15,515
- Time zone: UTC+0 (GMT 0)

Tapoa is one of the 45 provinces of Burkina Faso. It is located in the Est Region. Its capital is Diapaga.

== Departments ==
Tapoa is divided into 8 departments:

The Departments of Tapoa
Departments	Capitals	Population (Census 2006)
Botou Department	Botou	46,898
Diapaga Department	Diapaga	32,260
Kantchari Department	Kantchari	59,150
Logobou Department	Logobou	61,422
Namounou Department	Namounou	15,077
Partiaga Department	Partiaga	50,303
Tambaga Department	Tambaga	41,137
Tansarga Department	Tansarga	35,535

== See also ==
- Regions of Burkina Faso
- Provinces of Burkina Faso
- Departments of Burkina Faso
