= Burkina Faso–Niger Frontier Dispute case =

2013 public international law case

Burkina Faso-Niger Frontier Dispute case
- Court: International Court of Justice
- Full case name: Frontier Dispute (Burkina Faso/Niger)
- Decided: 16 April 2013
- Citations: Judgment, I.C.J. Reports 2013

Court membership
- Judges sitting: Peter Tomka (President), Bernardo Sepúlveda Amor (Vice-President), Hisashi Owada, Ronny Abraham, Kenneth Keith, Mohamed Bennouna, Leonid Skotnikov, Antônio Augusto Cançado Trindade, Abdulqawi Ahmed Yusuf, Christopher Greenwood, Xue Hanqin, Joan E. Donoghue, Giorgio Gaja, Julia Sebutinde, Dalveer Bhandari, Ahmed Mahiou (ad hoc), Yves Daudet (ad hoc)

Case opinions
- Declaration: Mohamed Bennouna Separate Opinion: Antônio Augusto Cançado Trindade; Separate Opinion: Abdulqawi Ahmed Yusuf; Separate Opinion: Ahmed Mahiou Separate Opinion: Yves Daudet

The Burkina Faso-Niger frontier dispute case (2013) was a public international law case with the International Court of Justice served by the West African states of Burkina Faso and Niger, which share a border. Both nations submitted a border dispute to the court in 2010. The court delivered its judgement in 2013, and the parties implemented it in 2015 and 2016.

== History ==
The dispute concerned the border between Burkina Faso and Niger, both of which occupy territory previously held by the French colonies of Upper Volta and Niger, respectively. Discussion regarding the border began shortly after the nations gained their independence, with an agreement first attempted in the Protocol Agreement of 23 June 1964, and another in the Protocol Agreement of 28 March 1987.

The 1987 Protocol established a Joint Technical Commission on Demarcation of the Frontier, which had the responsibility of determining the specifics of the border. It would do so by consulting a 1927 Arrêté from the Governor-General of French West Africa, and a clarifying Erratum of 5 October 1927. Where the Arrêté was insufficient, the commission would refer to a 1:200,000 scale map published by the Institut géographique national de France, 1960 edition.

By 2001, the commission had determined a border line that could be split into three sectors. The first and most northerly sector ran south from N'Gouma to the astronomic marker of Tong-Tong. The second sector, from Tong-Tong to the Botou Bend. The third and most southerly sector, from the Botou bend to the Mekrou River, where both countries border Benin.

Burkina Faso and Niger agreed on the first and third sectors but disagreed on the second, having different interpretations of the Arrêté. They concluded a special agreement that referred their dispute over the second sector to the ICJ. Burkina Faso also requested the court to place on record the boundary agreed to in the first and third sectors, to give it res judicata.

The matter was referred to the ICJ on 20 July 2010.

== Judgment ==
The International Court of Justice delivered its Judgement on 16 April 2013. The unanimous judgement mentioned the importance of the principles of uti possidetis juris and the intangibility of borders, in affirming the authority of the 1927 Arrêté over this matter. Judge Yusuf wrote in a separate opinion that uti possidetis juris and the intangibility of borders should be considered separate and distinct principles; the former being a guide to the determination of borders, and the latter being respect for borders already determined.

The court found it did not have jurisdiction to place the agreed to sectors on the record as its exercise of judicial functions required the existence of a dispute, and it was clear both parties agreed on this matter.

Under the border determined by the court, 786 square kilometres (303 square miles) of territory was assigned to Burkina Faso and 277 km^{2} (107 sq mi) to Niger. In 2015, the two nations agreed to exchange 18 towns over the following year (Burkina Faso to gain 14, Niger to gain four).

Leaders from both nations were reported to be satisfied with the ruling and were departing amicably.

=== Merits ===
The section in dispute between the Tong-Tong astronomic marker to the Botou bend was further divided into four sections:

1. From the Tong-Tong astronomic marker to the Tao astronomic marker;
2. From the Tao marker to the River Sirba at Bossé-bangou;
3. From Bossé-bangou to the intersection of the Sirba with the Say parallel;
4. From the intersection to the point located 1200m to the west of the village of Tchenguiliba, referred to as the Botou bend.

==== (1) Tong-Tong to Tao markers ====
Both Parties were in agreement on the location of the Tong-Tong astronomic marker at 14° 25´ 04˝N, 00° 12´ 47˝E, but had slightly different coordinates for the Tao marker. The court found it unnecessary to determine the precise location of the Tao marker as it was not a point of significant disagreement, and the Parties could determine the co-ordinates during demarcation operations.

The 1927 Arrêté had not specified how these two points should be connected, so the Parties differed in how it should be interpreted. Burkina Faso argued that the failure to specify implies these points should be connected with a straight line. Niger relied on a Record of Agreement of 13 April 1935 that had been established to settle a dispute between the residents of Dori and Téra. It referred to the 1927 Arrêté and asserted a notional line between the two markers, but running through a marker at Vibourié, situated east of a straight line between the markers.

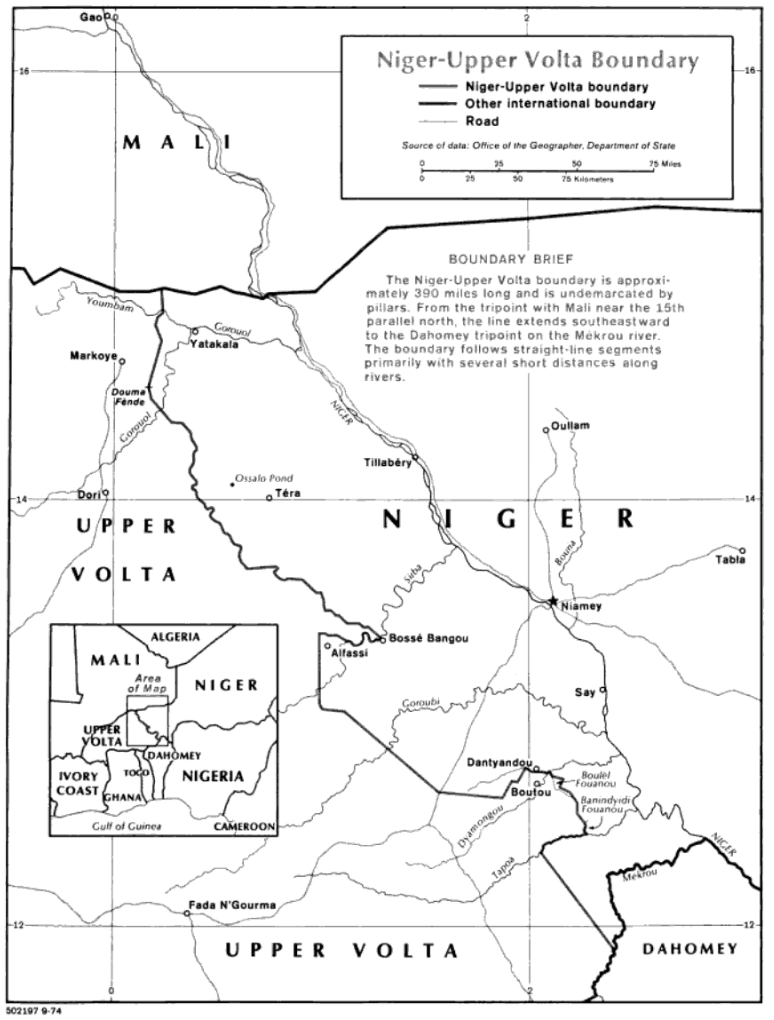
A map of the Burkina Faso-Niger border at 18 November 1974, by the US State Department.

The court held in favour of Burkina Faso. It believed that the easterly location of the Vibourié marker was a topographical error, as the Record of Agreement made clear the drafter believed the marker to lie on the straight line between the Tong-Tong and Tao markers.

==== (2) Tao marker to the River Sirba at Bossé-bangou ====
The 1927 Arrêté was again imprecise on how these points were to be connected. Burkina Faso took the same reasoning as for the first section, that the implication should be a straight line. Niger argued that as the 1927 Arrêté was imprecise, reference should be to the 1960 map as the Parties had agreed to in article 2 of the special agreement. The border on the map was sinuous, however Niger further departed from it in their drawing to the effect that the border would run to a point north-west of Bossé-bangou. They relied on the descriptions of the area from other documents that suggested the 1927 Arrêté was incorrectly drawn on this point. The 1927 Arrêté's raison d’être was to delineate new borders after the transfer of certain districts from the Colony of Upper Volta to the Colony of Niger, and the border it delineated did not properly account for those districts. Niger argued that according to the principle of uti possidetis juris, in the absence of legal title the border should be drawn according to the effectivités.

The court held that its mandate was to interpret and apply the 1927 Arrêté and, if it were inadequate, to use the 1960 map and not other principles of law. The court decided to follow the line drawn on the 1960 map; not in reasoning, but in effect a middle-ground between the Parties.

==== (3) Bossé-bangou to the intersection of the Sirba with the Say parallel ====
The court considered that as villages on either side of the border required access to water, the 1927 Arrêté would have intended the border to on the median line of the River Sirba and not on either bank. It found the wording was then clear on the border following the Sirba upstream and departing and turning at intersections of the river with lines of longitude and latitude, the final turn at the longitude where the Say parallel intersects with the River Sirba (at 13º 06’ 12.08”N, 00° 59´ 30.9˝E).

==== (4) The intersection to Botou bend ====
Both parties agreed on the point referred to as the Botou bend. Having located the intersection, the court had only to determine the line between these two points. Burkina Faso argued the 1927 Arrêté specified that this would be a straight line. Niger relied on colonial and postcolonial effectivités to argue that the two nations had come to an implicit agreement regarding a line that closer followed the 1960 map. Burkina Faso disputed this and the court found it had no evidence of such an agreement, concluding that the 1927 Arrêté was clear and should be followed.
