= Piccioni =

Piccioni is an Italian surname meaning "pigeon". Notable people with the surname include:

- Attilio Piccioni (1892–1976), Italian politician
- Enrico Piccioni (born 1961), Italian footballer
- Gianmarco Piccioni (born 1991), Italian footballer
- Giuseppe Piccioni (born 1953), Italian film director and screenwriter
- Marco Piccioni (born 1976), Italian footballer
- Oreste Piccioni (1915–2002), Italian-American physicist
- Piero Piccioni (1921–2004), Italian film score composer

== See also ==
- Piccione
