= Barron Field (author) =

English judge and author Barron Field (1786–1846)

- Born: 23 October 1786; England
- Died: 11 April 1846 (aged 59); Torquay, Devon, England
- Occupations: Judge, writer
- Writing career
- Language: English

Barron Field (23 October 1786 – 11 April 1846) was an English-born Australian judge and poet.

== Early life ==
Barron Field was born in Torquay, Devon, England on 23 October 1786; he was the second son of London surgeon Henry Field and his wife Esther née Barron. He was educated as a barrister and in 1811 he published an analysis for students of Blackstone's Commentaries (with a second edition in 1817). Field worked for a time as theatrical critic for The Times, and by the mid 1810s he was friends with Charles Lamb and Leigh Hunt, and the author of the play Antiquity: A Farce (1808), though this appears to have been unperformed.

== Judge in New South Wales ==
In 1816 Field accepted a commission as judge of the Supreme Court of Civil Jurisdiction of NSW, and arrived in Sydney on 24 February 1817, on board the female convict ship Lord Melville. Governor Lachlan Macquarie was, at first, impressed with Field, though he later had cause to amend that impression.

== Writing life ==
In 1819 he published First Fruits of Australian Poetry, the first volume of verse printed and issued in Australia. The volume consisted of only nine pages and two long poems: "Botany-Bay Flowers" and "The Kangaroo". The work was re-issued in 1823 with three added poems.

After he had returned to England, Field edited Geographical Memoirs on New South Wales (1825) which, among other things, introduced new species of plants, such as Boronia anemonifolia A.Cunn.

== Gibraltar and later life ==
Field accepted the position of advocate-fiscal in Ceylon in December 1828. He was soon afterward appointed judge of the Court of Civil Pleas at Gibraltar. Field had a disagreement with the Gibraltar Governor, Sir William Houston, over the handling of a case involving a Spanish smuggler ship, the Guerrera. In 1841 he retired from his position due to ill health and returned to England.

He died on 11 April 1846 at Torquay in Devon, survived by his wife (who died in 1878), there were no children.

== Works written ==
- First Fruits of Australian Poetry (1819), which contains:
  - "Botany-Bay Flowers" (1819)
  - "Kangaroo" (1819)
- "On Seeing the Bible Society's Map of the World" (1821)
- "On Affixing a Tablet to the Memory of Captain Cook, and Sir Joseph Banks, Against the Rock of Their First Landing in Botany Bay" (1822)
- "On Visiting the Spot Where Captain Cook, and Sir Joseph Banks, First Landed in Botany Bay" (1822)
- "On Reading the Controversy Between Lord Byron and Mr Bowles" (1823)
- Geographical Memoirs on New South Wales (editor), John Murray, UK, 1825
- Spanish Sketches (1841)
