= Kpuéré Department =

Coordinates: 9.4500°N 2.7833°W

Kpuéré
- Department
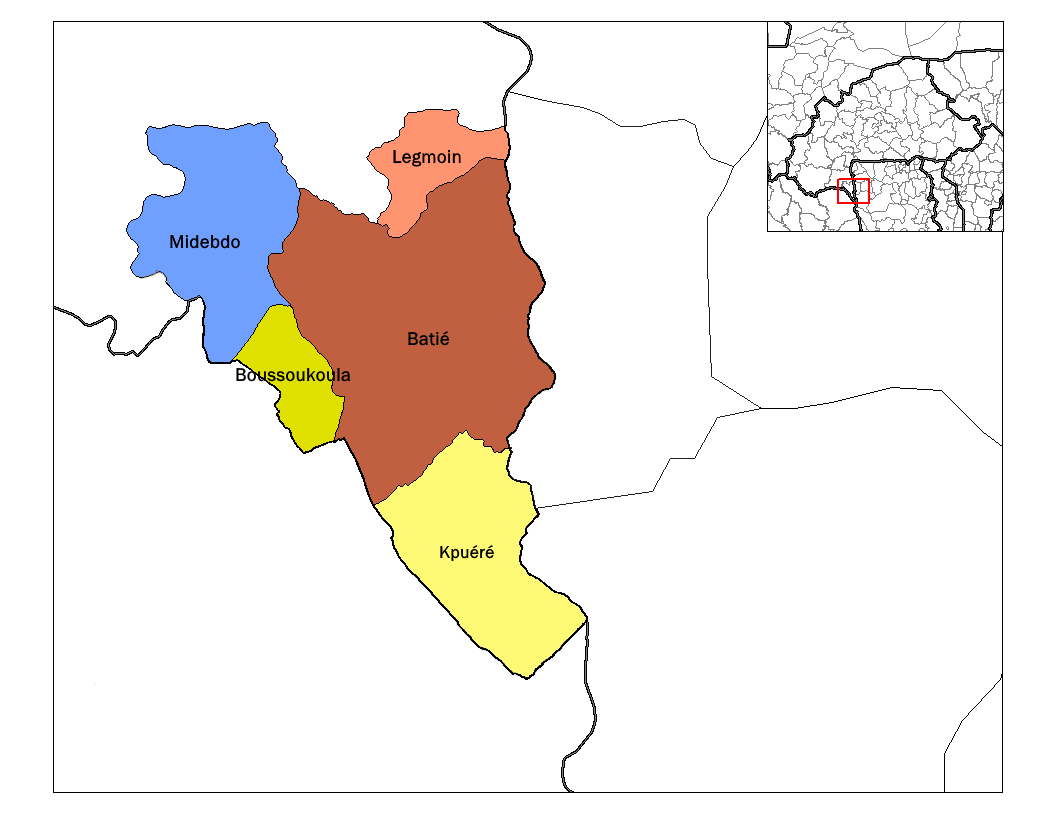
- Kpuéré Department location in the province
- Country: Burkina Faso
- Province: Noumbiel Province

Area
  - Total: 220.7 sq mi (571.5 km^{2})

Population (2019)
  - Total: 7,391
  - Density: 33.50/sq mi (12.93/km^{2})
- Time zone: UTC+0 (GMT 0)

Kpuéré is a department or commune of Noumbiel Province in south-eastern Burkina Faso. Its capital lies at the town of Kpuéré.

The 2 only other villages are Dianbile And Koanta

== Administrative Subdivisions ==
The department of Kpuéré is subdivided into 2 Subprefectures.

Subprefecture	Capital
Kpuéré	Kpuéré
Koulbi Yoraouetun	Koanta
