= Midebdo Department =

Coordinates: 9°59′N 3°8′W

Midebdo
- Department
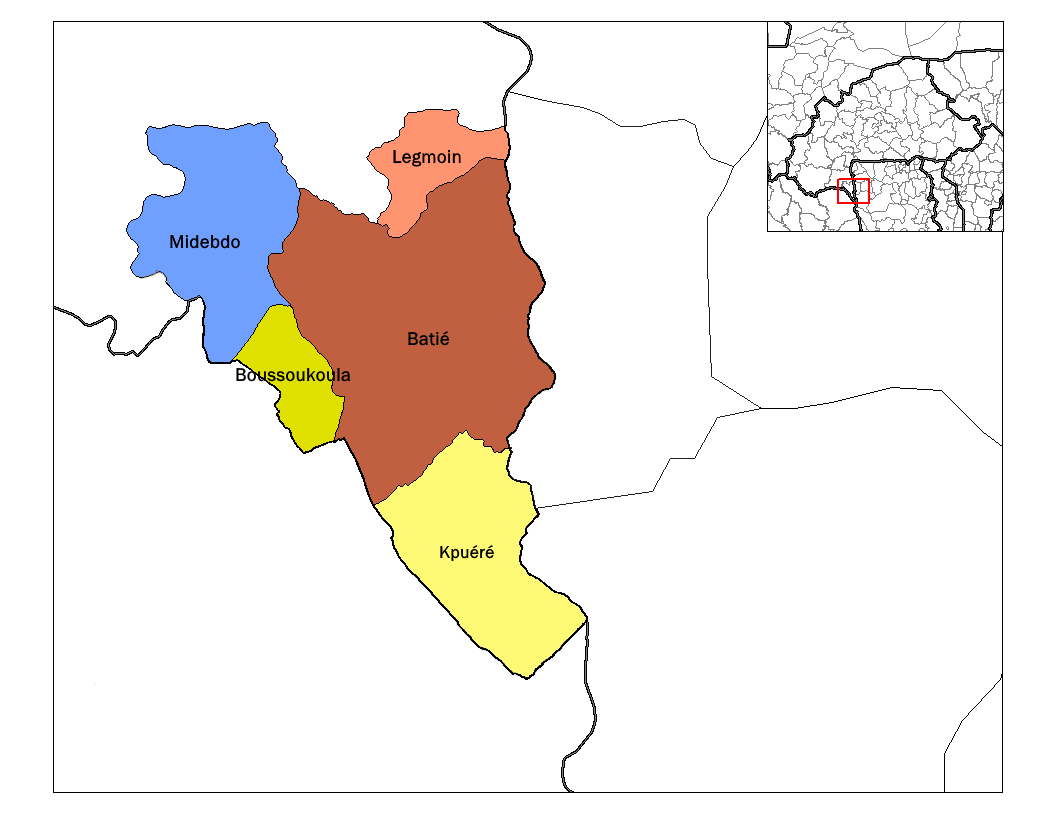
- Midebdo Department location in the province
- Country: Burkina Faso
- Province: Noumbiel Province

Area
  - Total: 224.0 sq mi (580.2 km^{2})

Population (2019 census)
  - Total: 15,347
  - Density: 68.51/sq mi (26.45/km^{2})
- Time zone: UTC+0 (GMT 0)

Midebdo is a department or commune of Noumbiel Province in south-eastern Burkina Faso. Its capital lies at the town of Midebdo.
