= Departments of Burkina Faso =

Administrative division and commune of Burkina Faso

The provinces of Burkina Faso are divided into 351 departments (as of 2014 and since local elections of 2012), whose urbanized areas (cities, towns and villages) are grouped into the same commune (municipality) with the same name as the department. The department also covers rural areas (including national natural parks) that are not governed locally by the elected municipal council of the commune (presided by its mayor, with representants elected for each village or urban sector), but by the state represented at departmental level by a prefect (supervized by the haut-commissaire of its province, themself assisted by a general secretary and acting under the hierarchic authority the governor of its region, all of them being nominated by the national government).

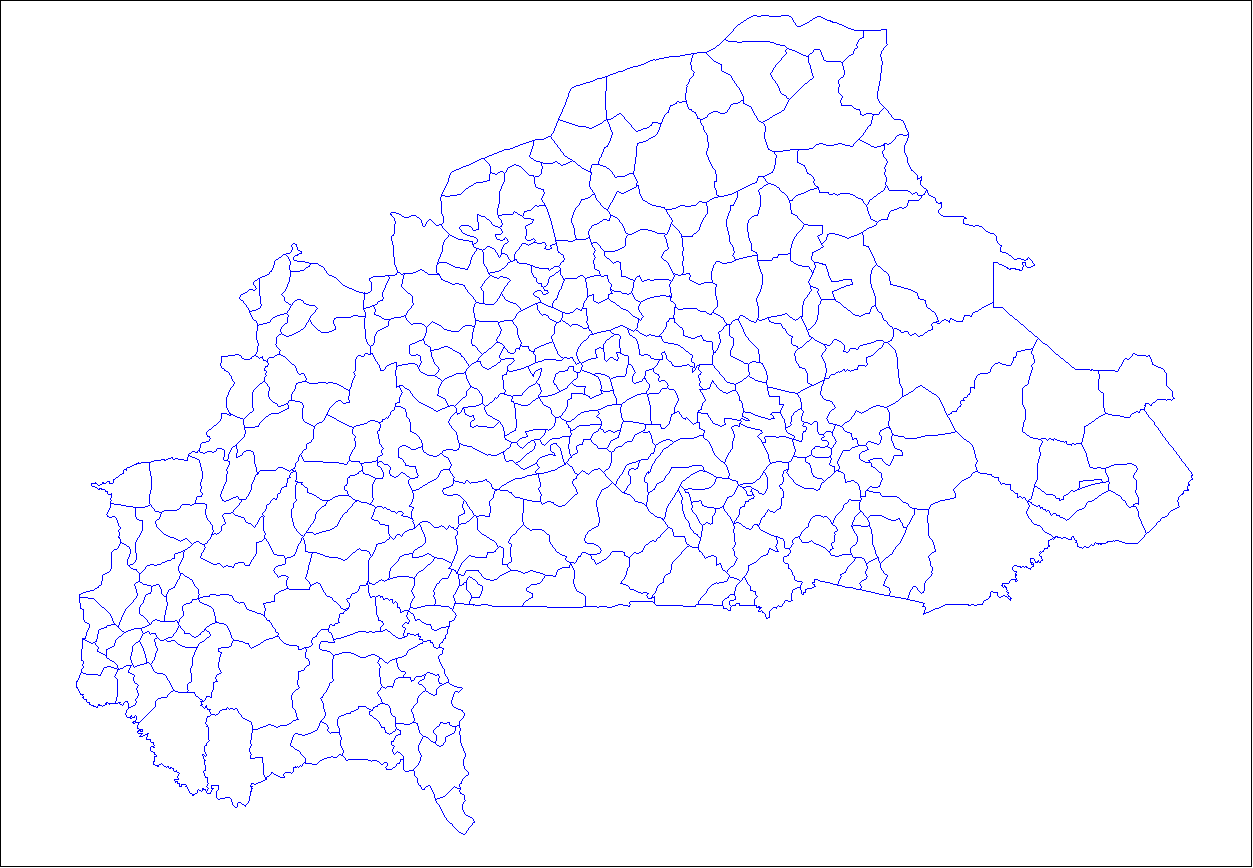
The 351 departments (or communes) of Burkina Faso.

== Status of communes ==
The 351 communes (municipalities) created for each one of these departments have three kinds of status :

- 49 urban communes are grouping their main city/town (subdivided into urban sectors) and all other administrative villages in their department; in these 49 urban communes, the main city or town is subdivided into urban sectors (within the two communes with special status, each urban sector of the capital city belongs to only one arrondissement, which may also include other surrounding villages outside the capital city). These 49 urban communes include:
  - the capital town (or city) of each one of the 45 provinces (and of the 13 regions); among them, 2 urban communes have a particular status: the Ouagadougou and Bobo-Dioulasso departments, that are further subdivided into "arrondissements";
  - the commune of 4 additional departments, whose capitals are now large towns covering their respective urban areas (subdivided into urban sectors rather than former separate villages) : Bittou, Garango, Niangoloko and Pouytenga.
- 302 rural communes are grouping all administrative villages in their department. Their capitals are still considered officially as "villages", because they also cover a large rural area with dispersed population (with some exceptions expansion, notably around the largest cities of the country, whose urbanized agglomerations are expanding towards the rural area of their bordering departments and absorbing their villages; some of these departments may become urban communes as well, integrating their former villages into urban sectors of their reformed commune).

Departments (or communes) generally have the same name as their capital city or town, with a few exceptions (for historical reasons). For the local elections in 2012, communes were created in each department that still did not have one (village councils were kept but operate at advisory level under the supervision of their commune: each administrative village or urban sector elects at least 2 seats in the municipal council of their commune; for other elections at regional or national level, the smallest electoral circumscription is the whole department).

== List of departments or communes by region and by province ==
Type of departments : (rur.) rural commune; (urb.) urban commune; (urb.p.s.) urban commune with particular status (subdivided in arrondissements).

=== Centre Region ===
Kadiogo Province

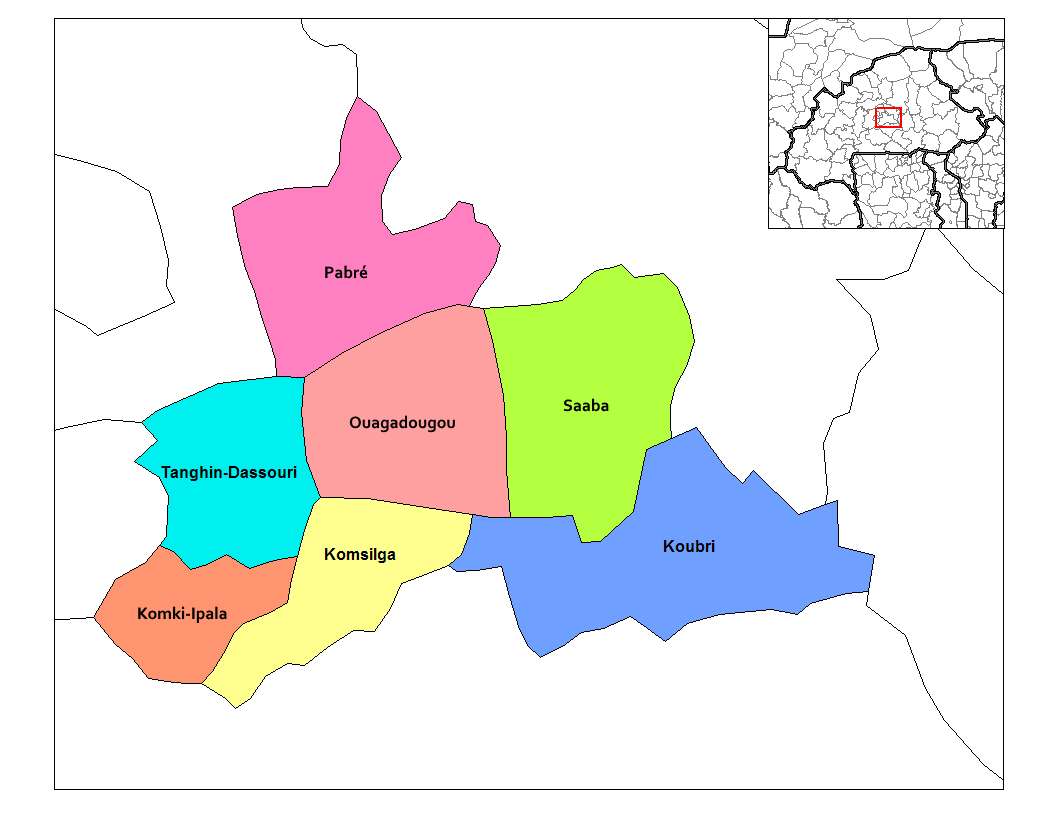
Location of the 7 departments (or communes) in Kadiogo Province.

- Komki-Ipala (rur.)
- Komsilga (rur.)
- Koubri (rur.)
- Ouagadougou (urb.p.s.)
  (provincial, regional and national capital)
- Pabré (rur.)
- Saaba (rur.)
- Tanghin-Dassouri (rur.)

=== Plateau-Central Region ===
Ganzourgou Province

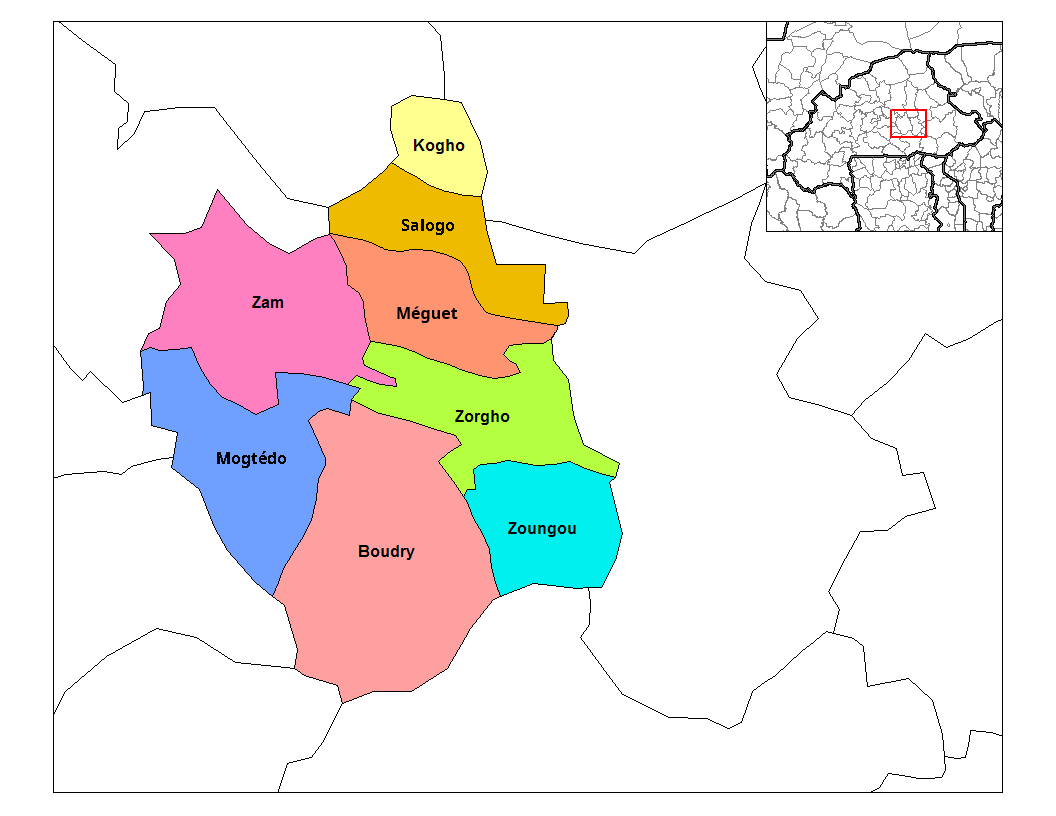
Location of the 8 departments (or communes) in Ganzourgou Province.

- Boudry (rur.)
- Kogho (rur.)
- Méguet (rur.)
- Mogtédo (rur.)
- Salogo (rur.)
- Zam (rur.)
- Zorgho (urb.)
  (provincial capital)
- Zoungou (rur.)

Kourwéogo Province

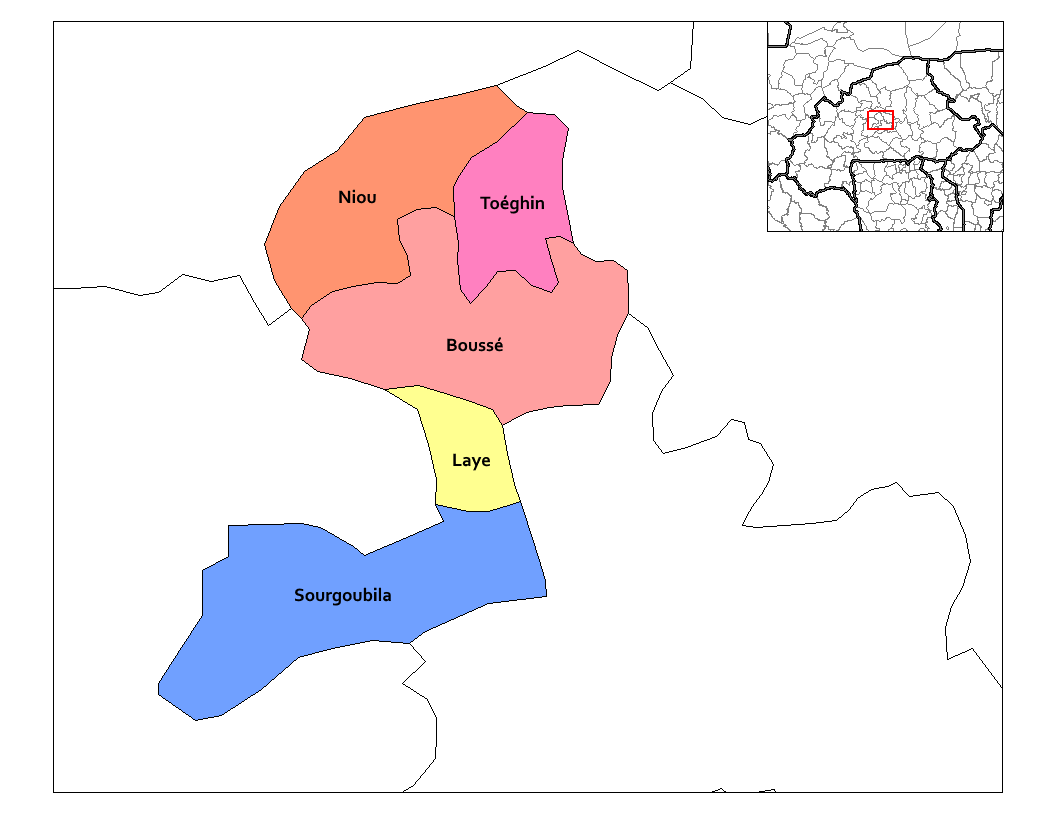
Location of the 5 departments (or communes) in Kourwéogo Province.

- Boussé (urb.)
  (provincial capital)
- Laye (rur.)
- Niou (rur.)
- Sourgoubila (rur.)
- Toéghin (rur.)

Oubritenga Province

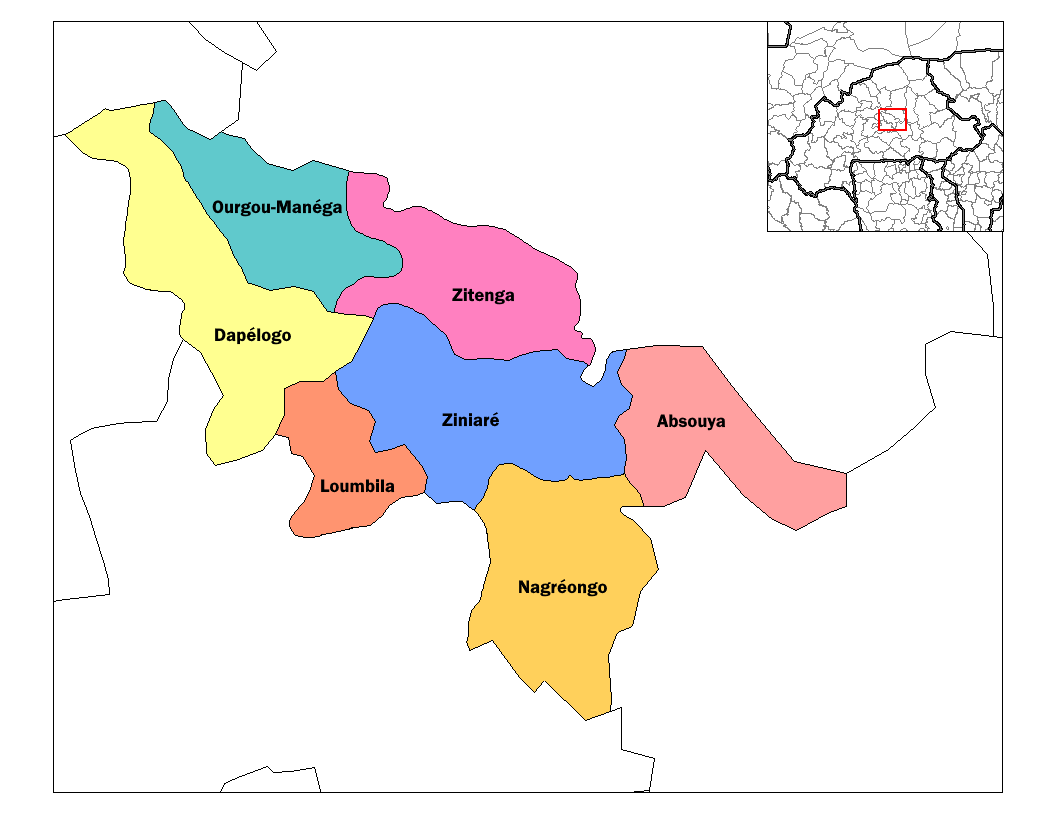
Location of the 7 departments (or communes) in Oubritenga Province.

- Absouya (rur.)
- Dapélogo (rur.)
- Loumbila (rur.)
- Nagréongo (rur.)
- Ourgou-Manéga (rur.)
- Ziniaré (urb.)
  (provincial and regional capital)
- Zitenga (rur.)

=== Centre-Nord Region ===
Bam Province

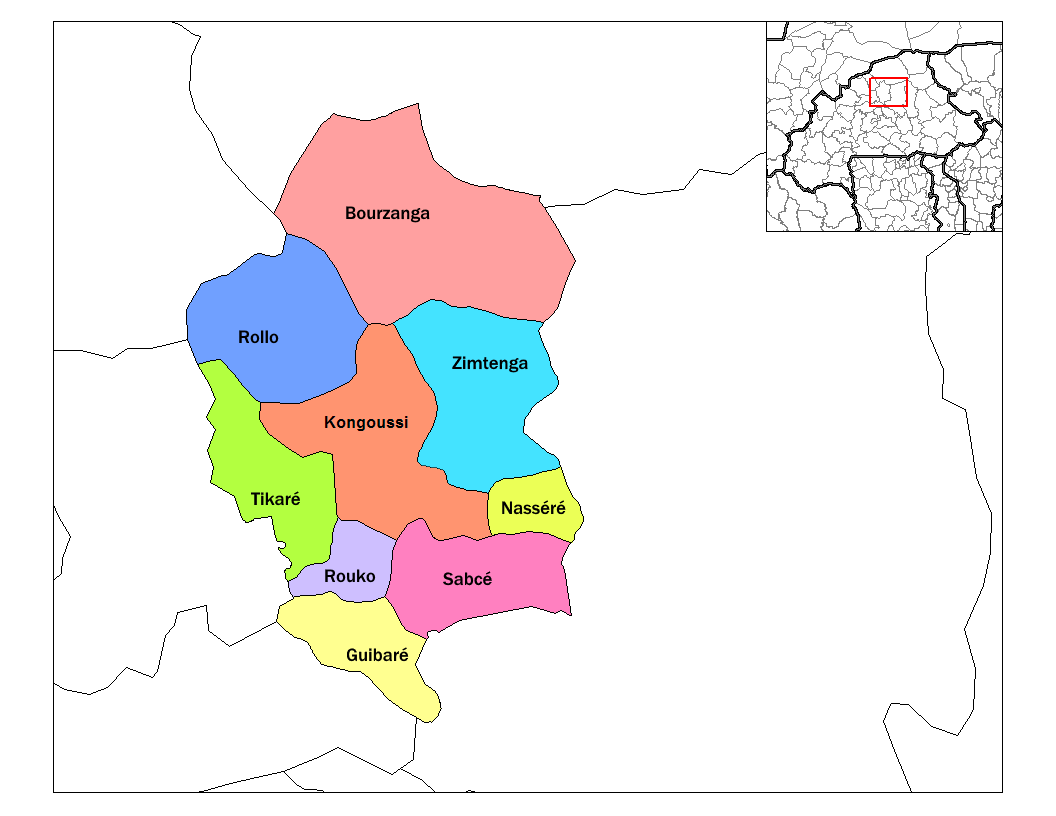
Location of the 9 departments (or communes) in Bam Province.

- Bourzanga (rur.)
- Guibaré (rur.)
- Kongoussi (urb.)
  (provincial capital)
- Nasséré (rur.)
- Rollo (rur.)
- Rouko (rur.)
- Sabcé (rur.)
- Tikaré (rur.)
- Zimtenga (rur.)

Namentenga Province

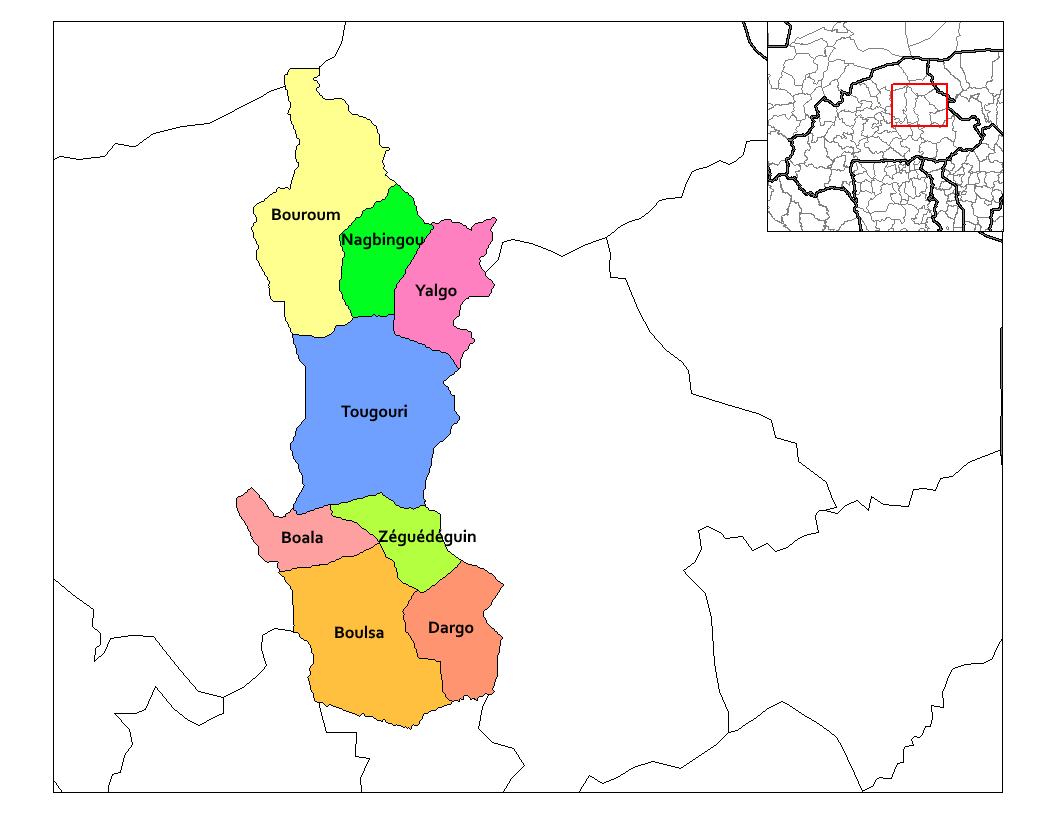
Location of the 8 departments (or communes) in Namentenga Province.

- Boala (rur.)
- Boulsa (urb.)
  (provincial capital)
- Bouroum (rur.)
- Dargo (rur.)
- Nagbingou (rur.)
- Tougouri (rur.)
- Yalgo (rur.)
- Zéguédéguin (rur.)

Sanmatenga Province

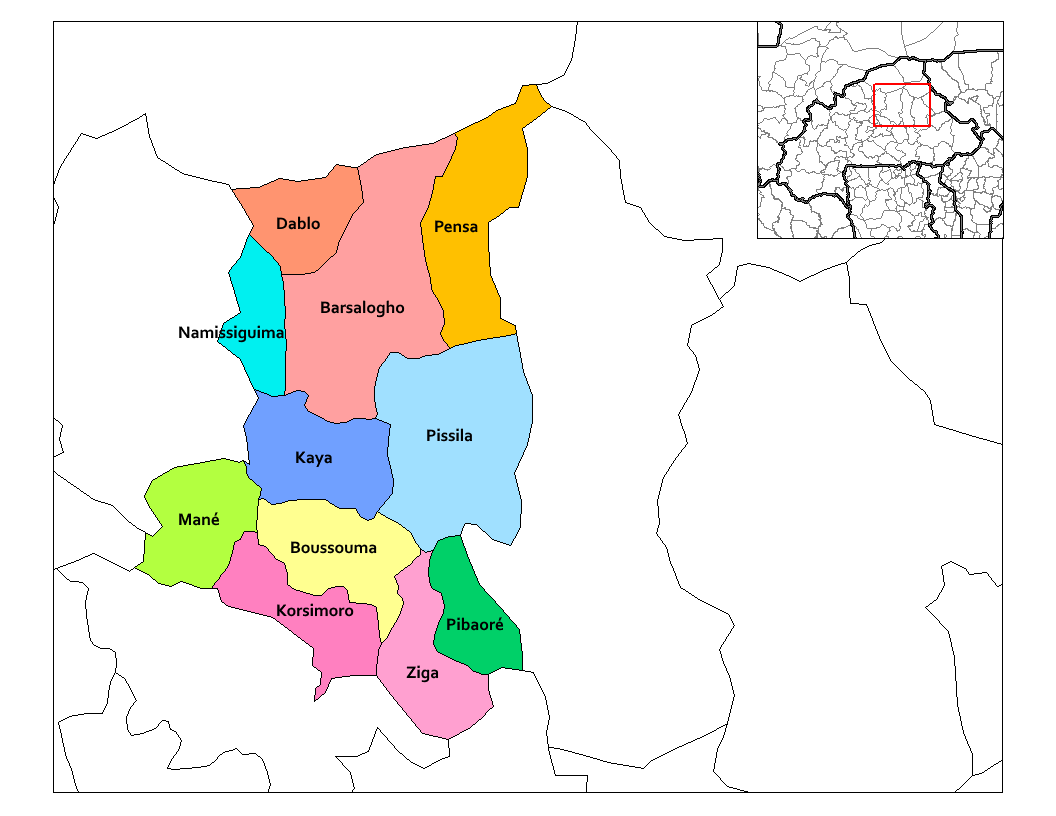
Location of the 11 departments (or communes) in Sanmatenga Province.

- Barsalogho (rur.)
- Boussouma (rur.)
- Dablo (rur.)
- Kaya (urb.)
  (provincial and regional capital)
- Korsimoro (rur.)
- Mané (rur.)
- Namissiguima (rur.)
- Pensa (rur.)
- Pibaoré (rur.)
- Pissila (rur.)
- Ziga (rur.)

=== Nord Region ===
Loroum Province

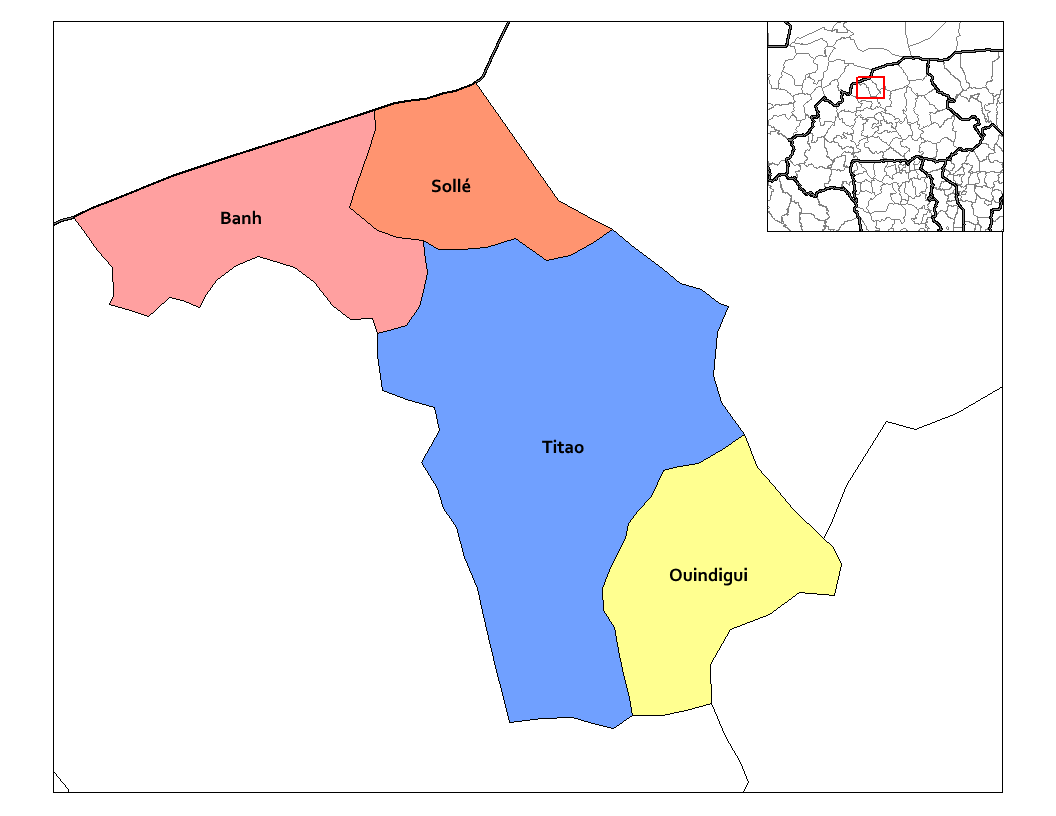
Location of the 4 departments (or communes) in Loroum Province.

- Banh (rur.)
- Ouindigui (rur.)
- Sollé (rur.)
- Titao (urb.)
  (provincial capital)

Passoré Province

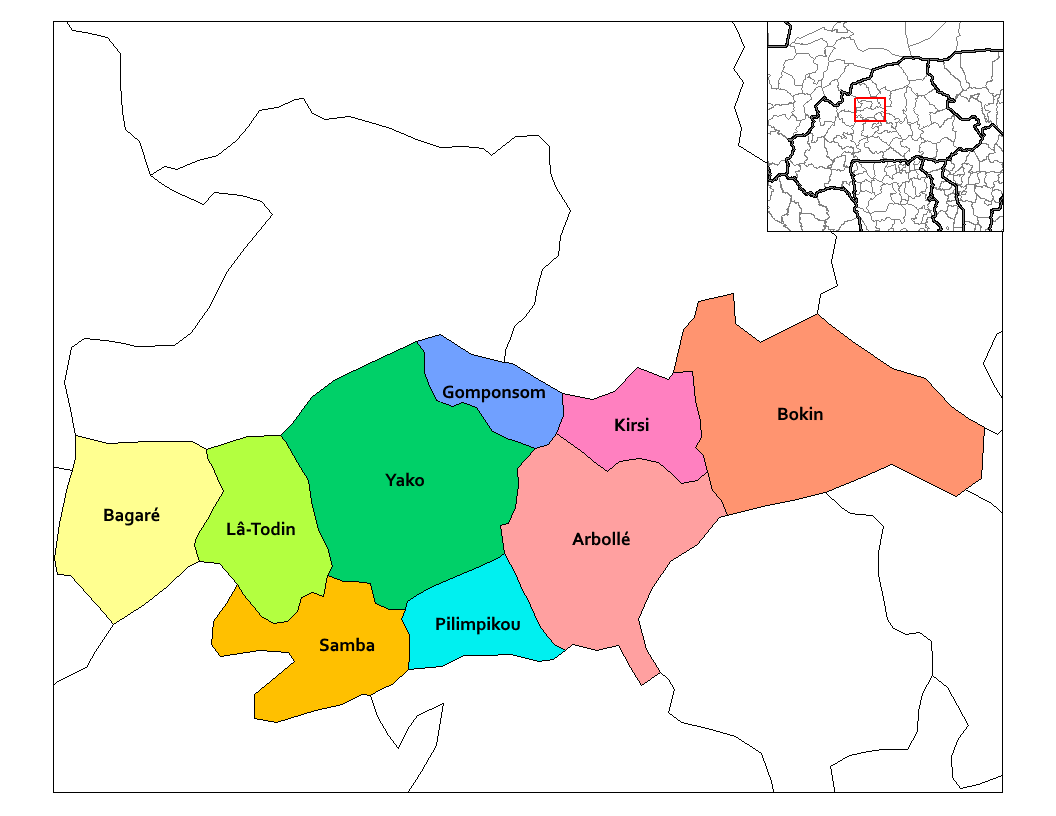
Location of the 9 departments (or communes) in Passoré Province.

- Arbollé (rur.)
- Bagaré (rur.)
- Bokin (rur.)
- Gomponsom (rur.)
- Kirsi (rur.)
- Lâ-Todin (rur.)
- Pilimpikou (rur.)
- Samba (rur.)
- Yako (urb.)
  (provincial capital)

Yatenga Province

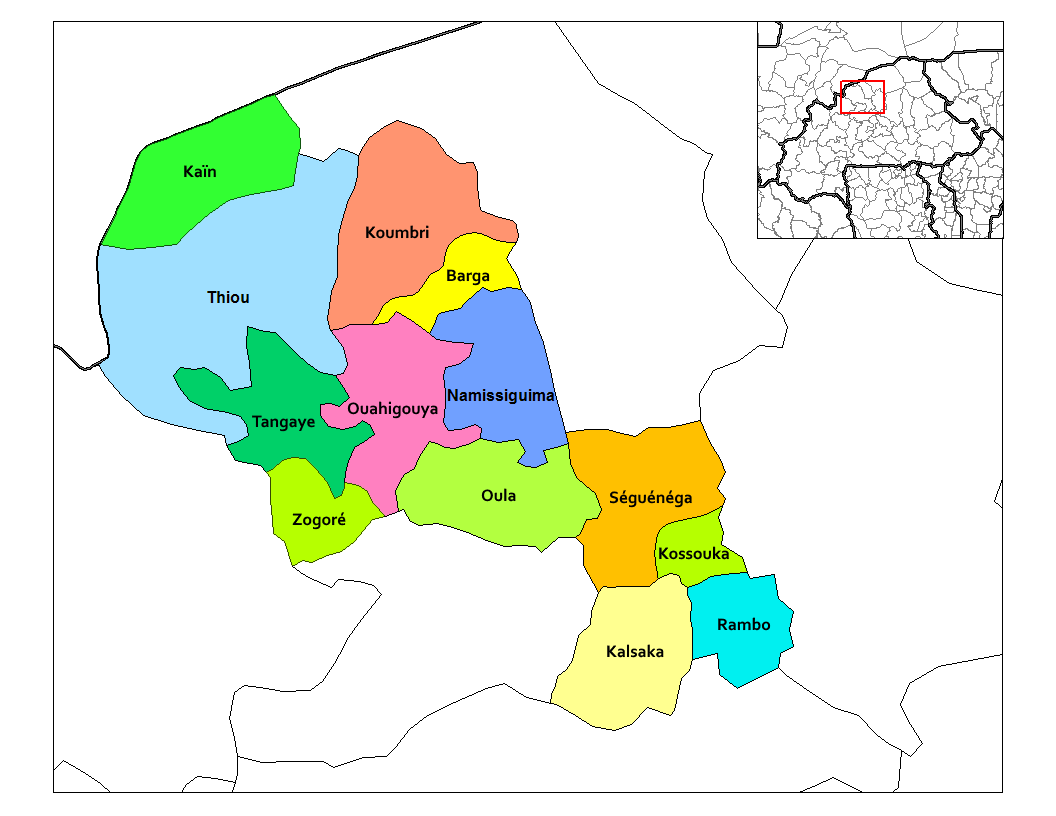
Location of the 13 departments (or communes) in Yatenga Province.

- Barga (rur.)
- Kaïn (rur.)
- Kalsaka (rur.)
- Kossouka (rur.)
- Koumbri (rur.)
- Namissiguima (rur.)
- Ouahigouya (urb.)
  (provincial and regional capital)
- Oula (rur.)
- Rambo (rur.)
- Séguénéga (rur.)
- Tangaye (rur.)
- Thiou (rur.)
- Zogoré (rur.)

Zondoma Province

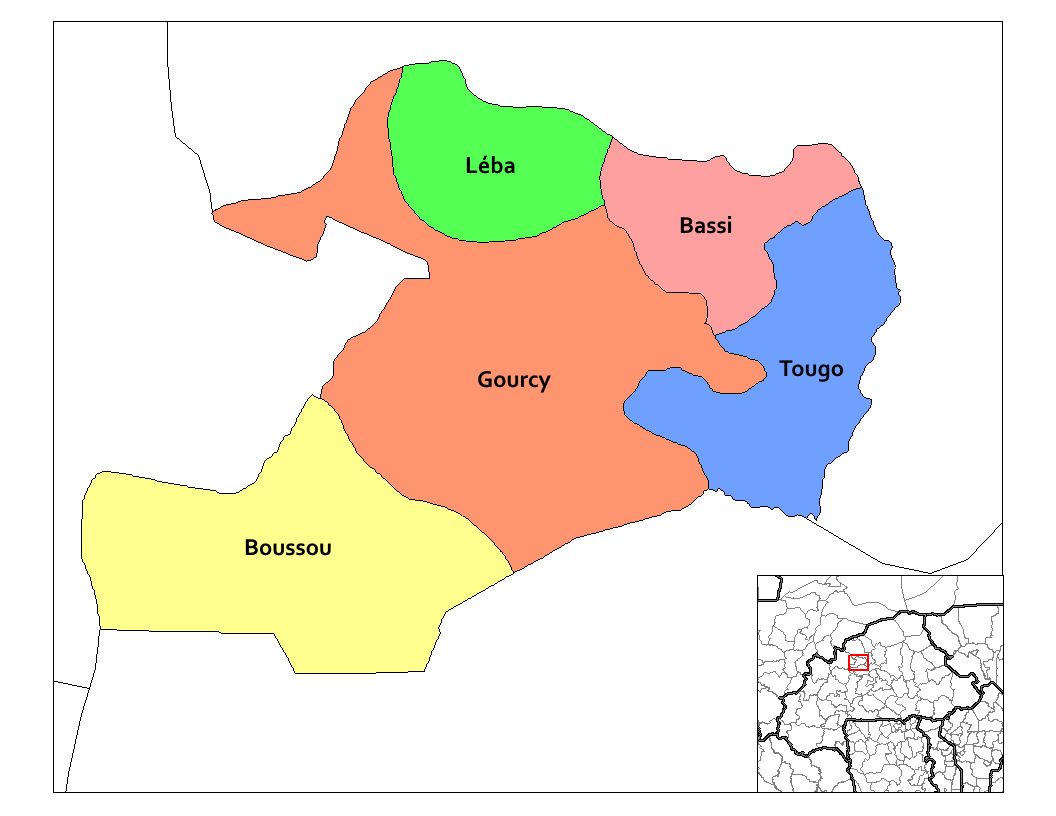
Location of the 5 departments (or communes) in Zondoma Province.

- Bassi (rur.)
- Boussou (rur.)
- Gourcy (urb.)
  (provincial capital)
- Léba (rur.)
- Tougo (rur.)

=== Sahel Region ===
Oudalan Province

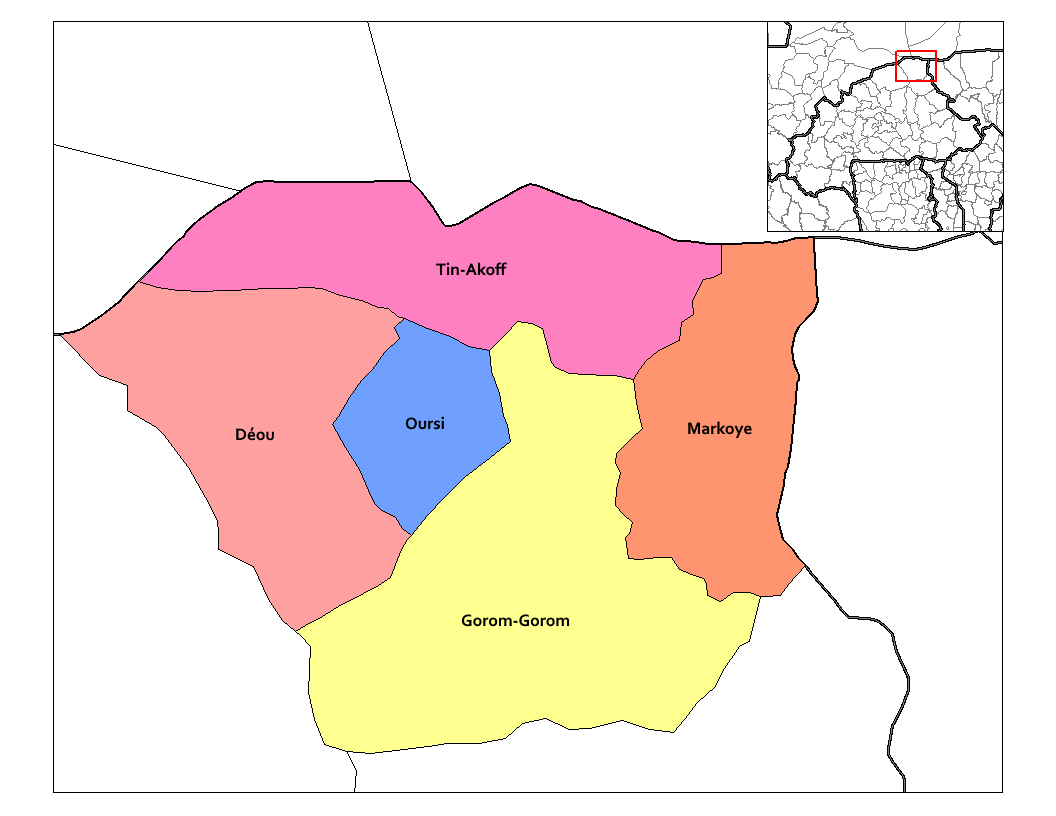
Location of the 5 departments (or communes) in Oudalan Province.

- Déou (rur.)
- Gorom-Gorom (urb.)
  (provincial capital)
- Markoye (rur.)
- Oursi (rur.)
- Tin-Akoff (rur.)

Séno Province

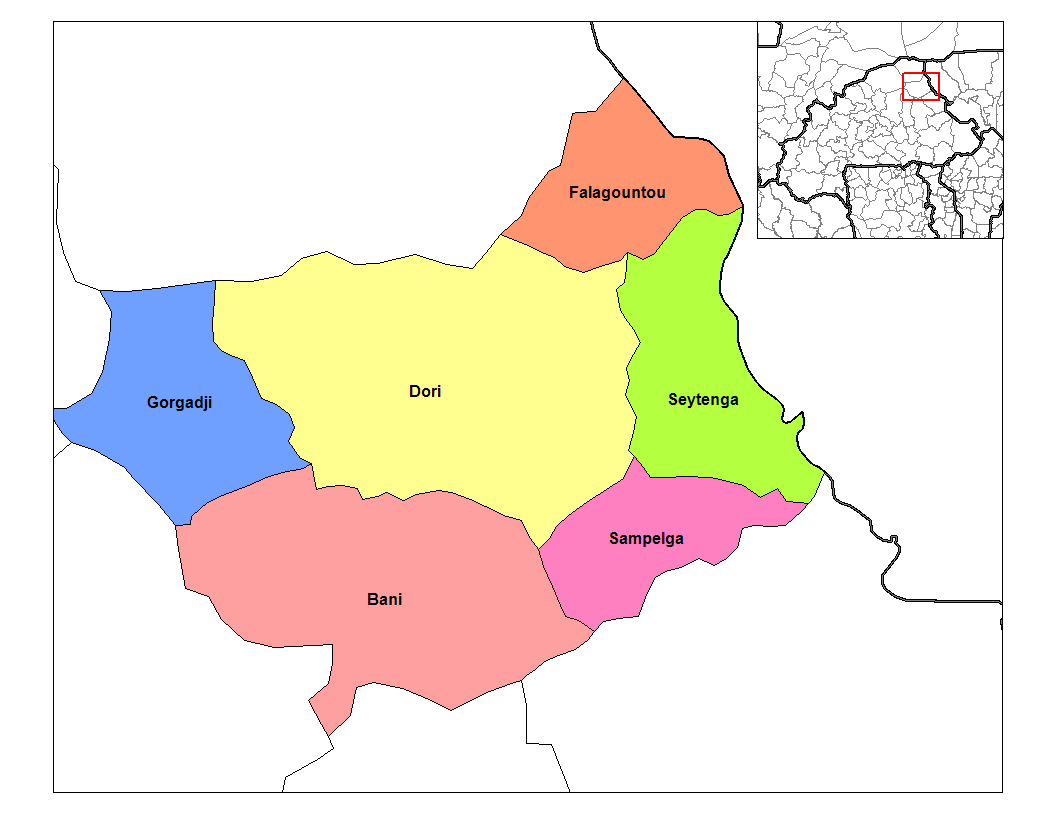
Location of the 6 departments (or communes) in Séno Province.

- Bani (rur.)
- Dori (urb.)
  (provincial and regional capital)
- Falagountou (rur.)
- Gorgadji (rur.)
- Sampelga (rur.)
- Seytenga (rur.)

Soum Province

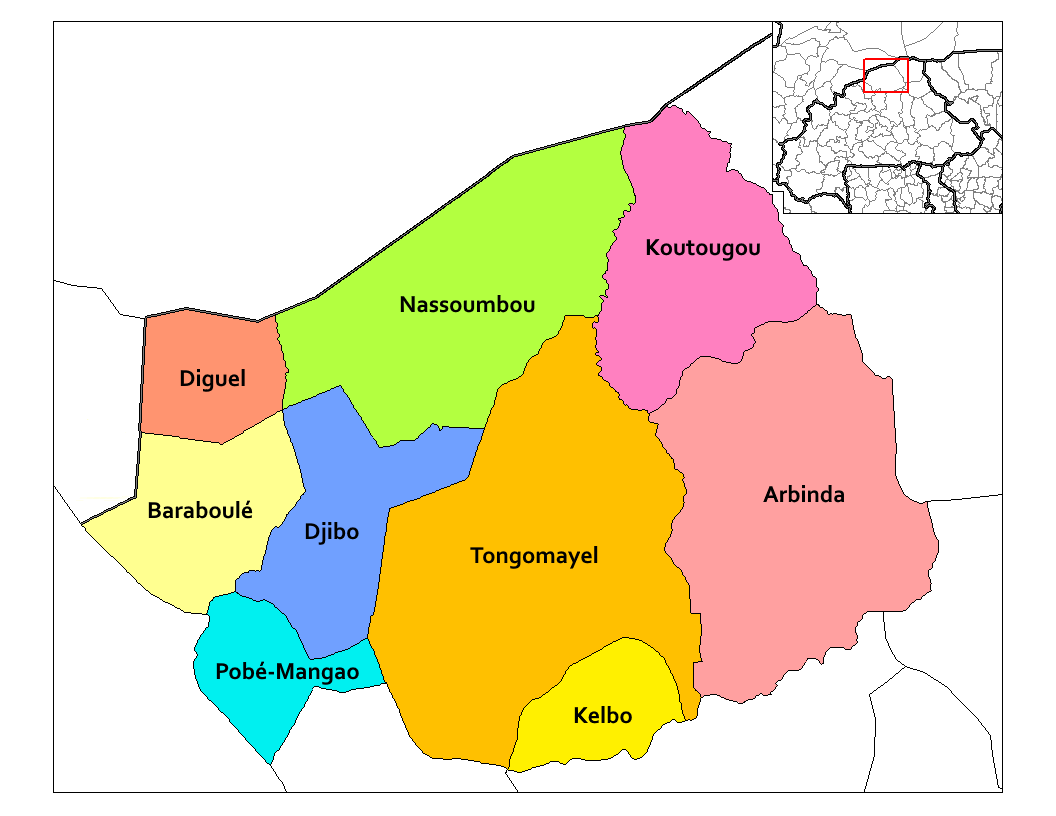
Location of the 9 departments (or communes) in Soum Province.

- Arbinda (rur.)
- Baraboulé (rur.)
- Diguel (rur.)
- Djibo (urb.)
  (provincial capital)
- Kelbo (rur.)
- Koutougou (rur.)
- Nassoumbou (rur.)
- Pobé-Mengao (rur.)
- Tongomayel (rur.)

Yagha Province

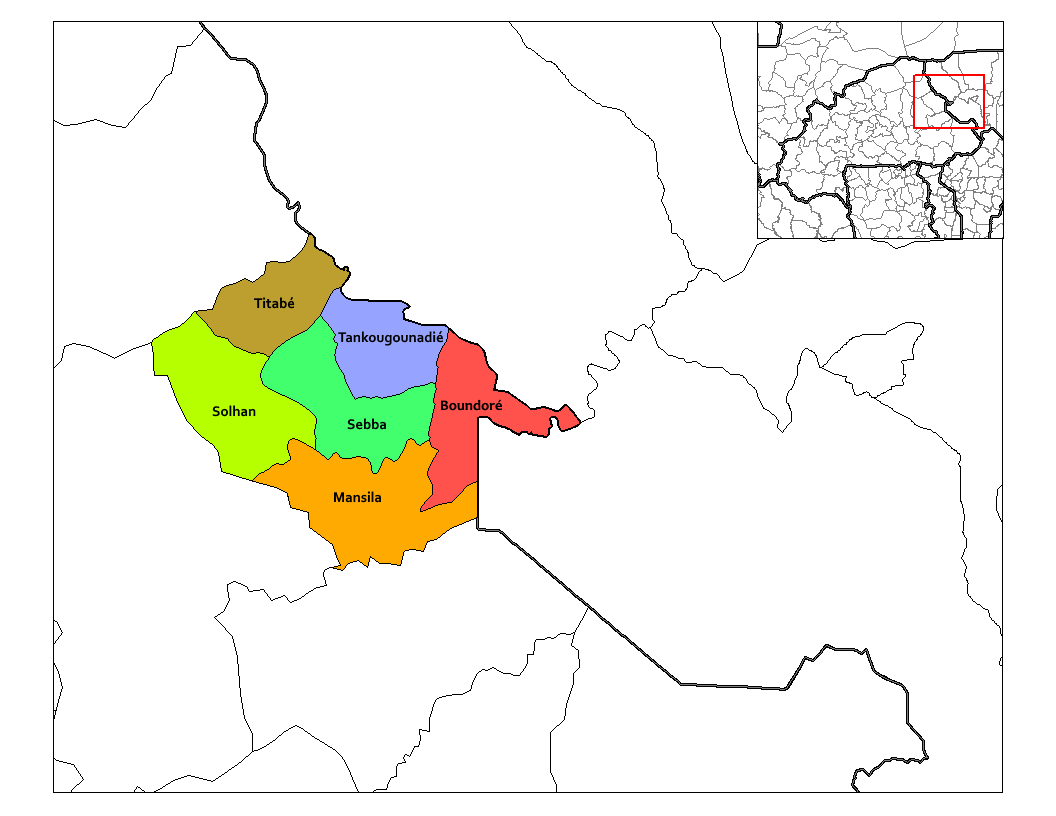
Location of the 6 departments (or communes) in Yagha Province.

- Boundoré (rur.)
- Mansila (rur.)
- Sebba (urb.)
  (provincial capital)
- Solhan (rur.)
- Tankougounadié (rur.)
- Titabé (rur.)

=== Est Region ===
Gnagna Province

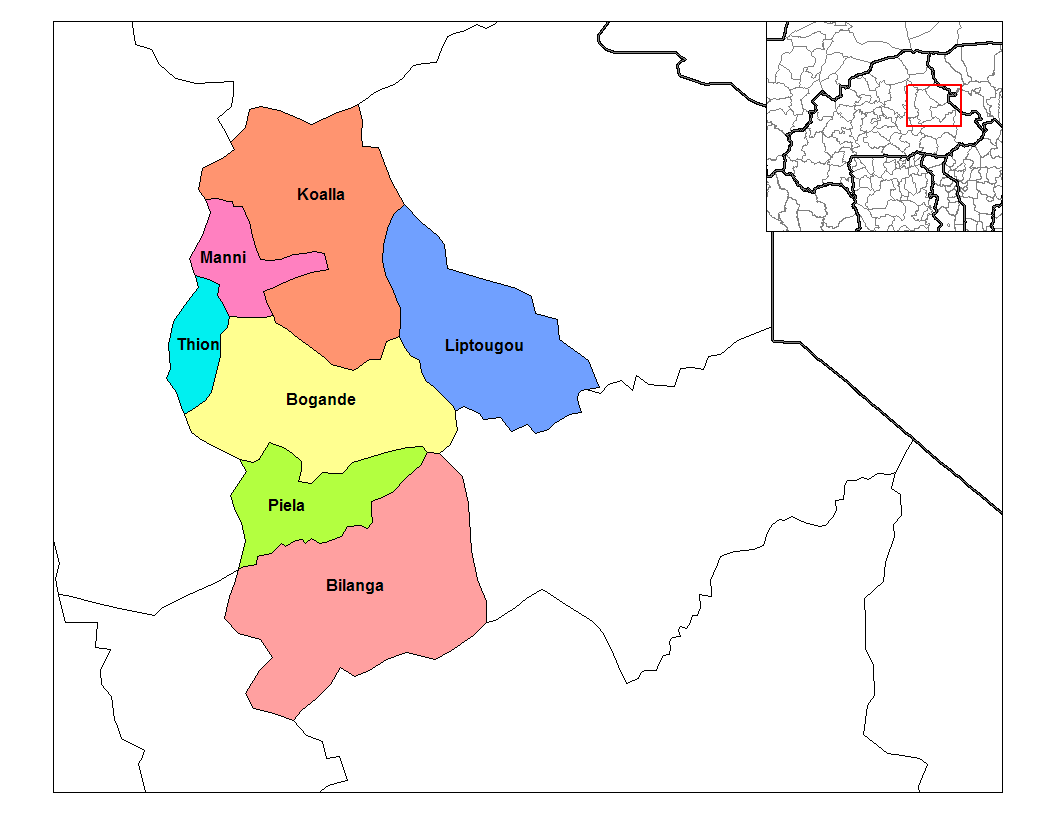
Location of the 7 departments (or communes) in Gnagna Province.

- Bilanga (rur.)
- Bogandé (urb.)
  (provincial capital)
- Coalla (rur.)
- Liptougou (rur.)
- Manni (rur.)
- Piéla (rur.)
- Thion (rur.)

Gourma Province

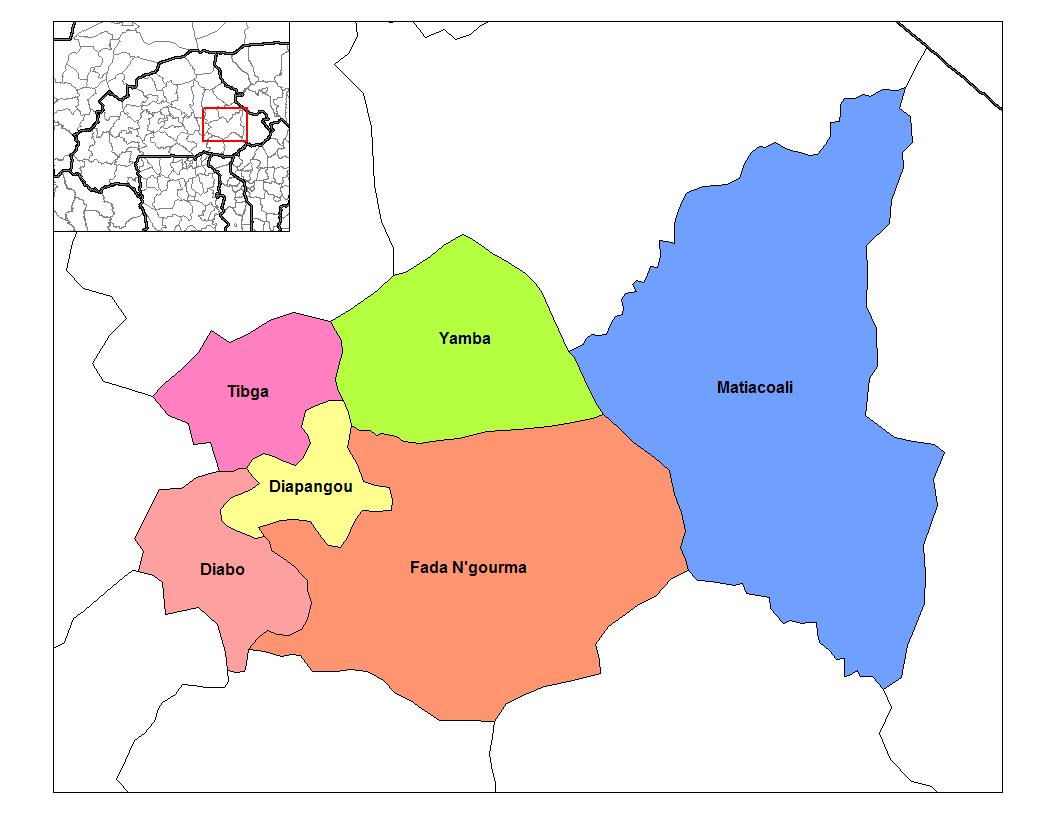
Location of the 6 departments (or communes) in Gourma Province.

- Diabo (rur.)
- Diapangou (rur.)
- Fada N′Gourma (urb.)
  (provincial and regional capital)
- Matiacoali (rur.)
- Tibga (rur.)
- Yamba (rur.)

Komondjari Province

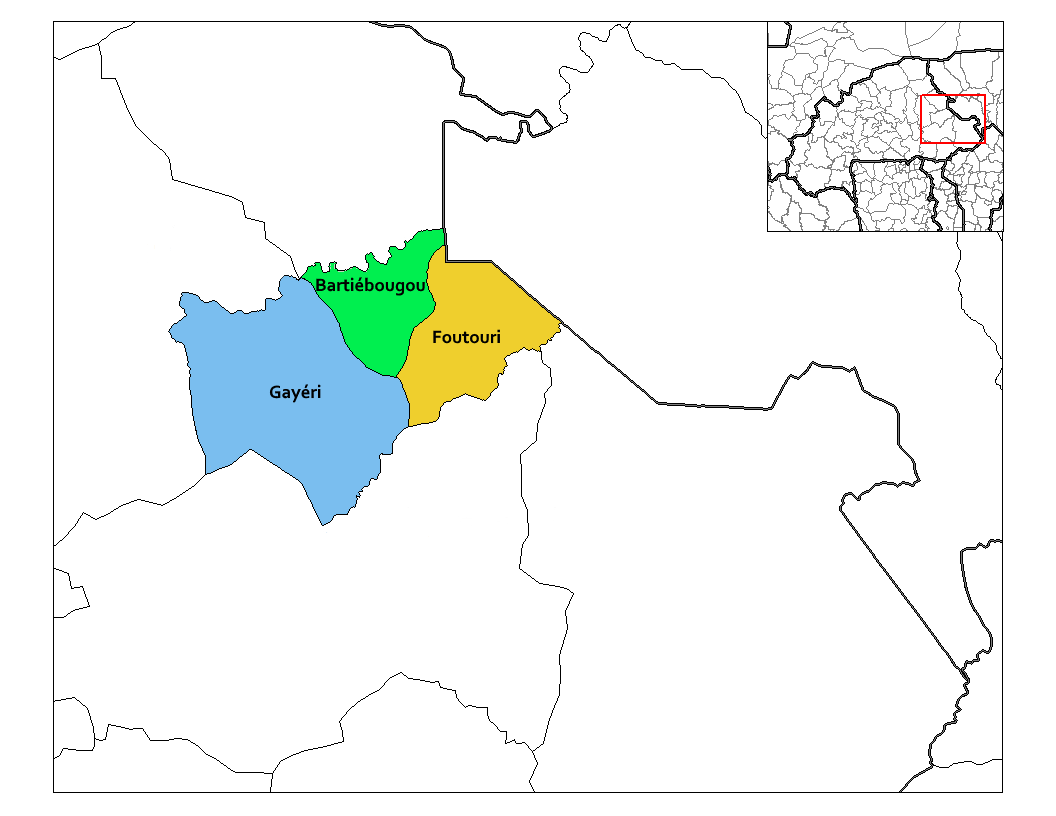
Location of the 3 departments (or communes) in Komondjari Province.

- Bartiébougou (rur.)
- Foutouri (rur.)
- Gayéri (urb.)
  (provincial capital)

Kompienga Province

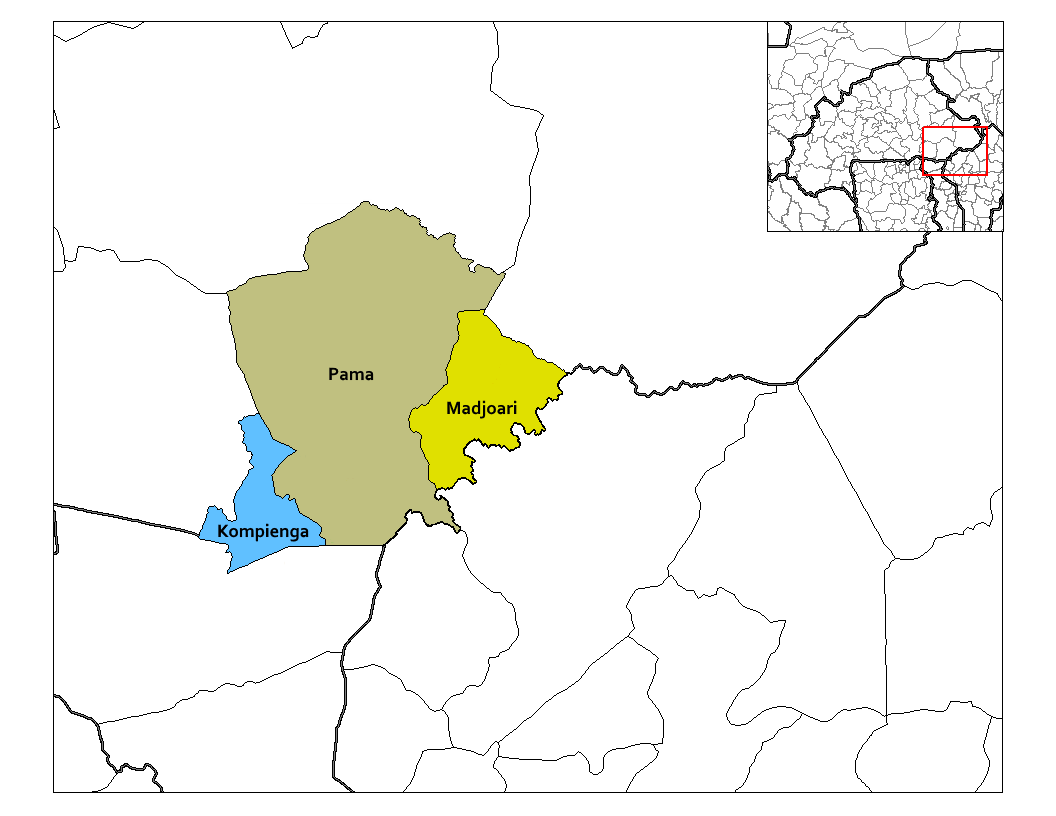
Location of the 3 departments (or communes) in Kompienga Province.

- Kompienga (rur.)
- Madjoari (rur.)
- Pama (urb.)
  (provincial capital)

Tapoa Province

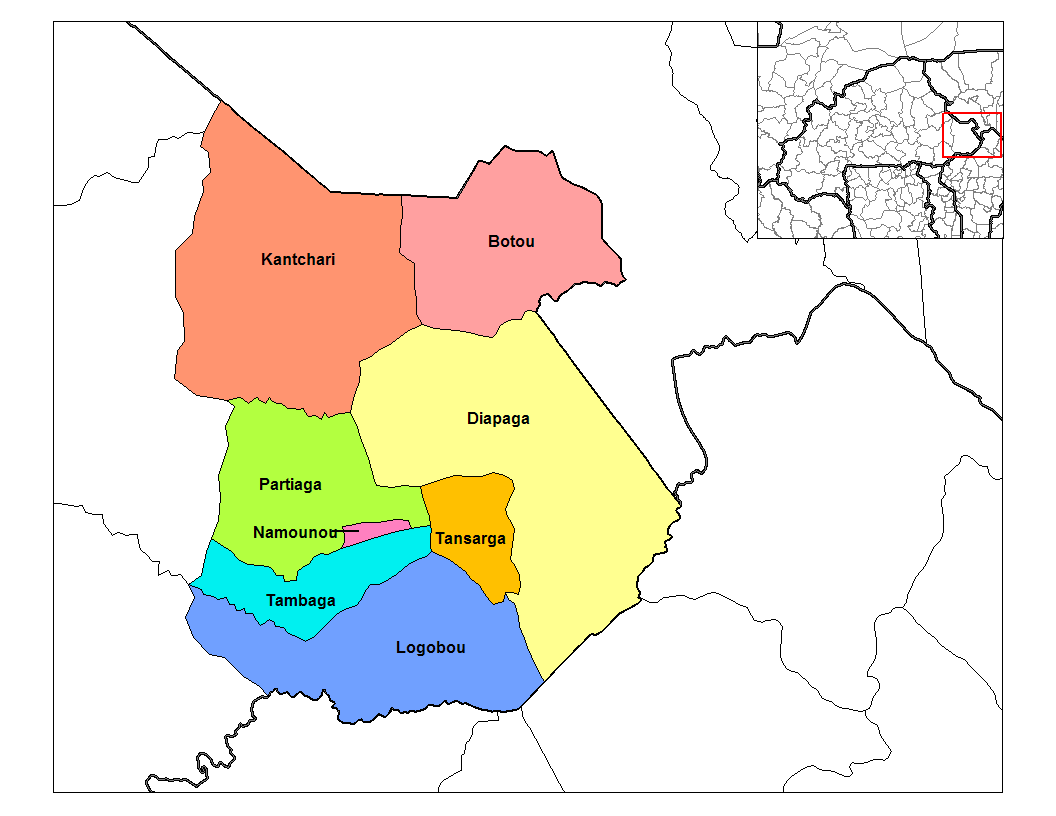
Location of the 8 departments (or communes) in Tapoa Province.

- Botou (rur.)
- Diapaga (urb.)
  (provincial capital)
- Kantchari (rur.)
- Logobou (rur.)
- Namounou (rur.)
- Partiaga (rur.)
- Tambaga (rur.)
- Tansarga (rur.)

=== Centre-Est Region ===
Boulgou Province

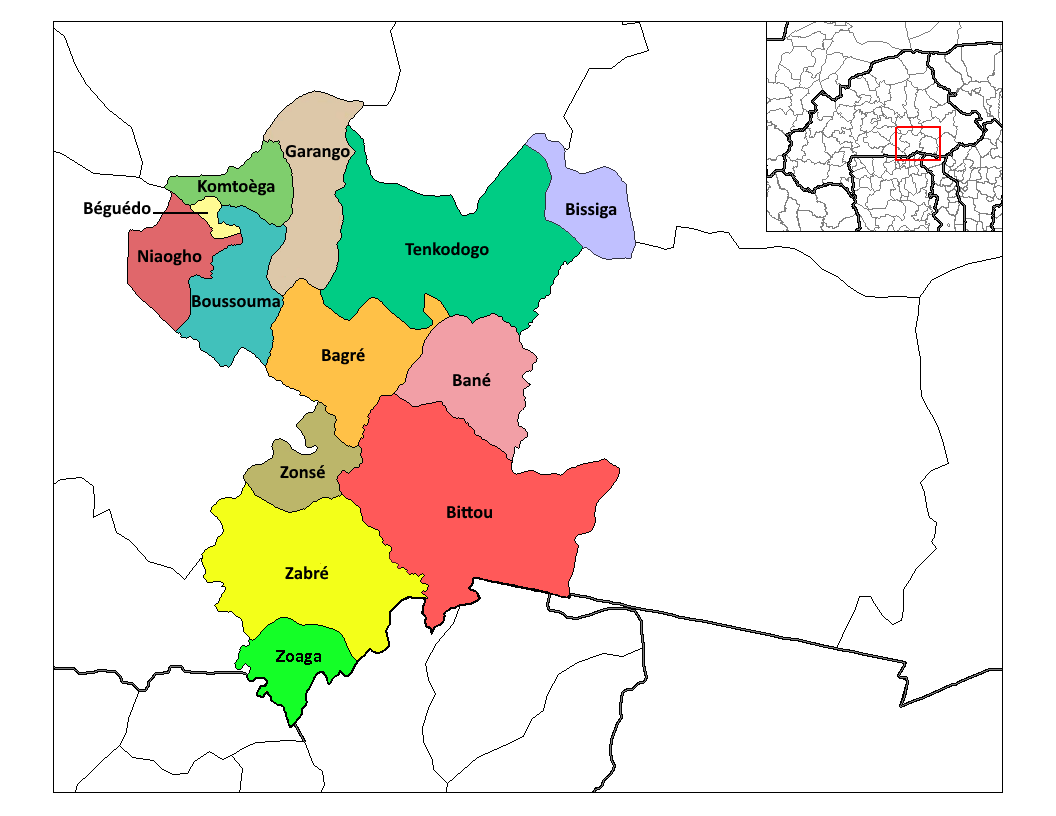
Location of the 13 departments (or communes) in Boulgou Province.

- Bagré (rur.)
- Bané (rur.)
- Béguédo (rur.)
- Bissiga (rur.)
- Bittou (urb.)
- Boussouma (rur.)
- Garango (urb.)
- Komtoèga (rur.)
- Niaogho (rur.)
- Tenkodogo (urb.)
  (provincial and regional capital)
- Zabré (rur.)
- Zoaga (rur.)
- Zonsé (rur.)

Koulpélogo Province

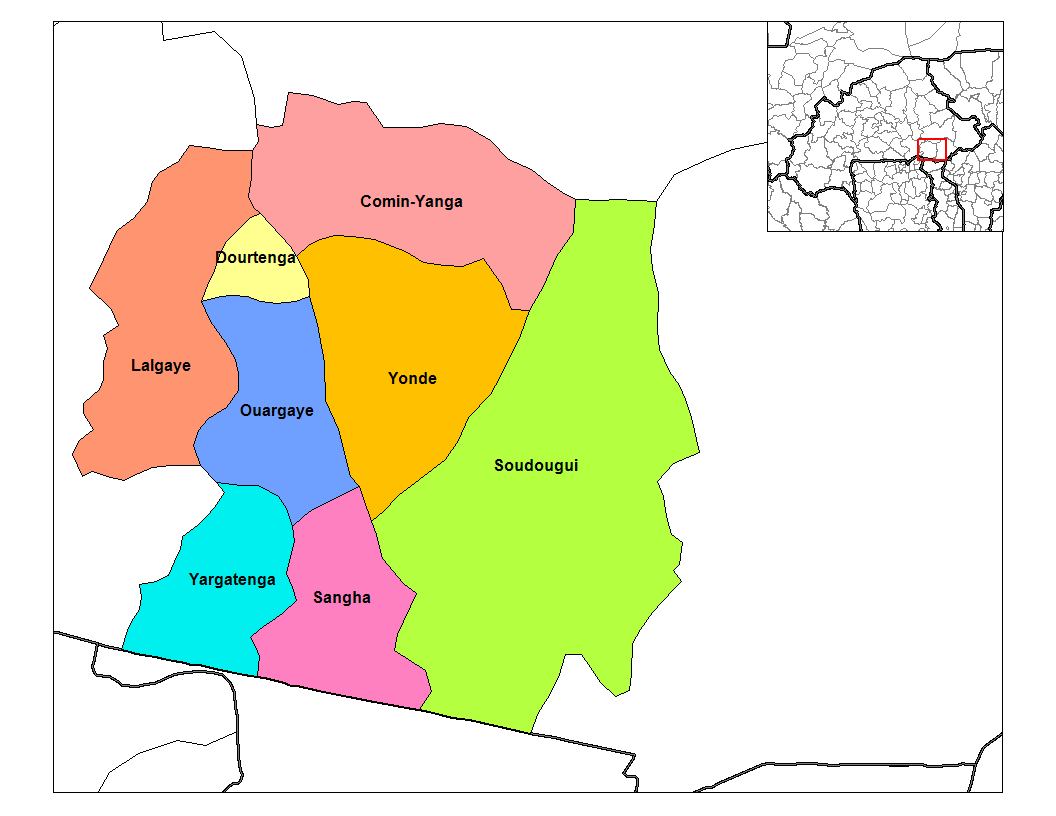
Location of the 8 departments (or communes) in Koulpélogo Province.

- Comin-Yanga (rur.)
- Dourtenga (rur.)
- Lalgaye (rur.)
- Ouargaye (urb.)
  (provincial capital)
- Sangha (rur.)
- Soudougui (rur.)
- Yargatenga (rur.)
- Yondé (rur.)

Kouritenga Province

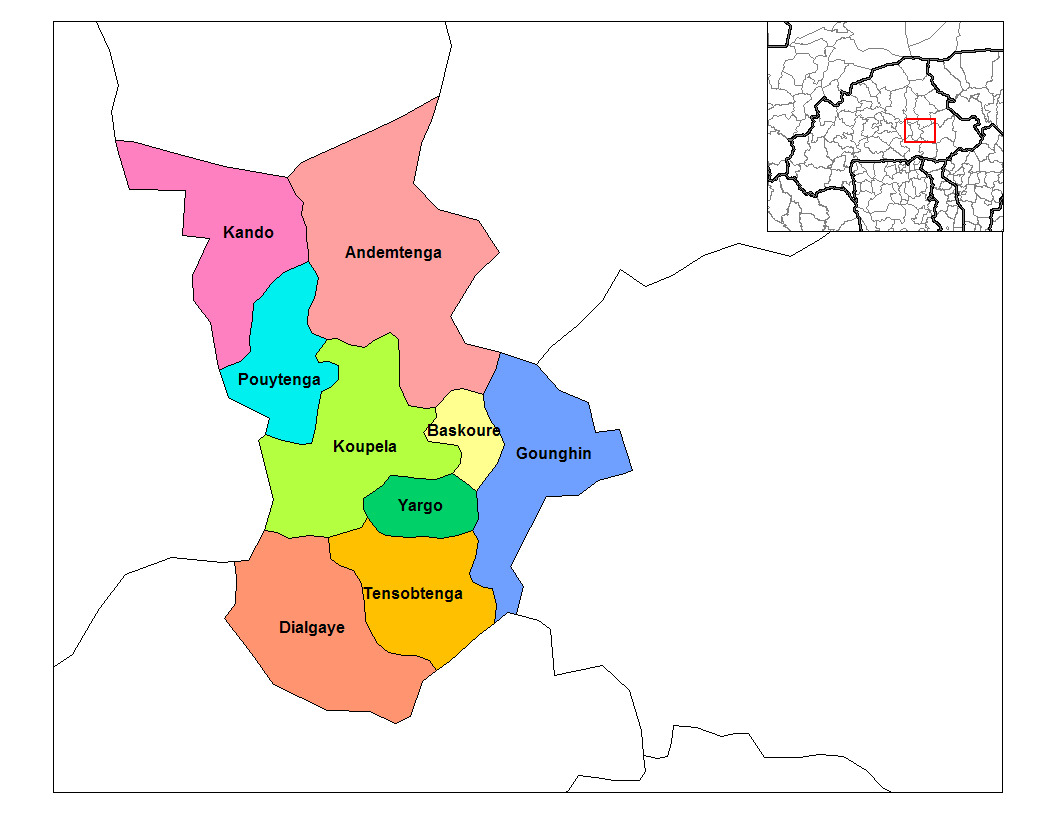
Location of the 9 departments (or communes) in Kouritenga Province.

- Andemtenga (rur.)
- Baskouré (rur.)
- Dialgaye (rur.)
- Gounghin (rur.)
- Kando (rur.)
- Koupéla (urb.)
  (provincial capital)
- Pouytenga (urb.)
- Tensobentenga (rur.)
- Yargo (rur.)

=== Centre-Sud Region ===
Bazèga Province

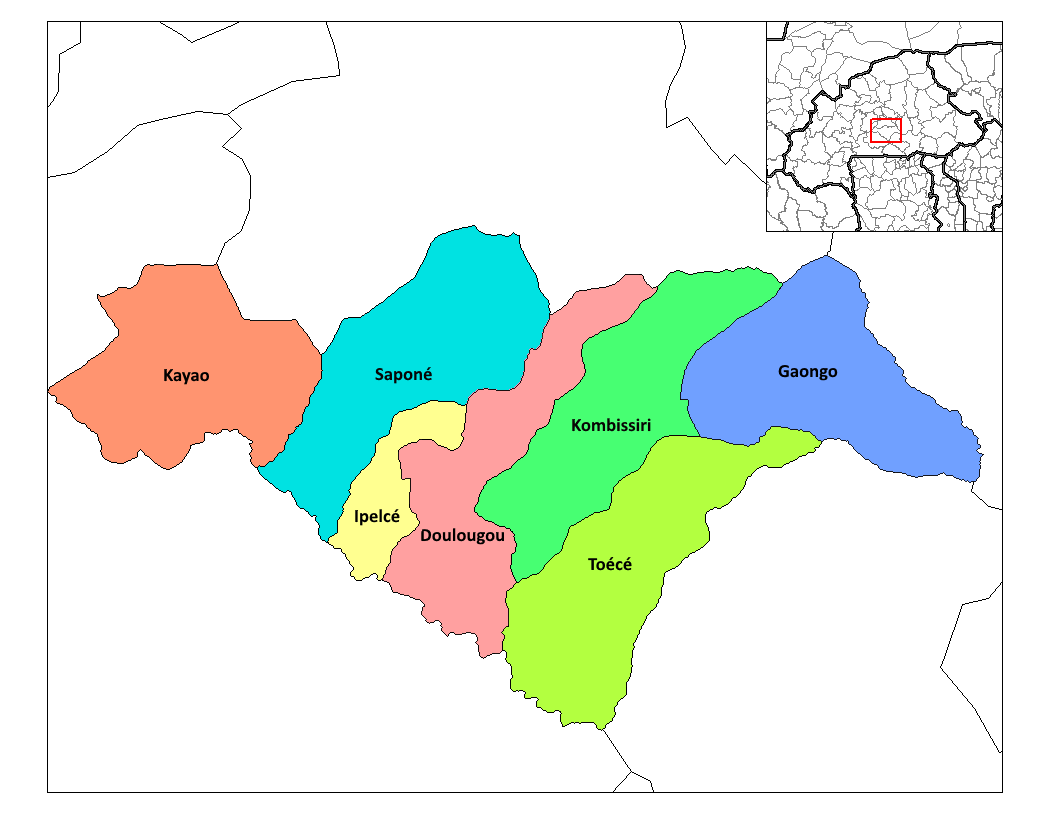
Location of the 7 departments (or communes) in Bazèga Province.

- Doulougou (rur.)
- Gaongo (rur.)
- Ipelcé (rur.)
- Kayao (rur.)
- Kombissiri (urb.)
  (provincial capital)
- Saponé (rur.)
- Toécé (rur.)

Nahouri Province

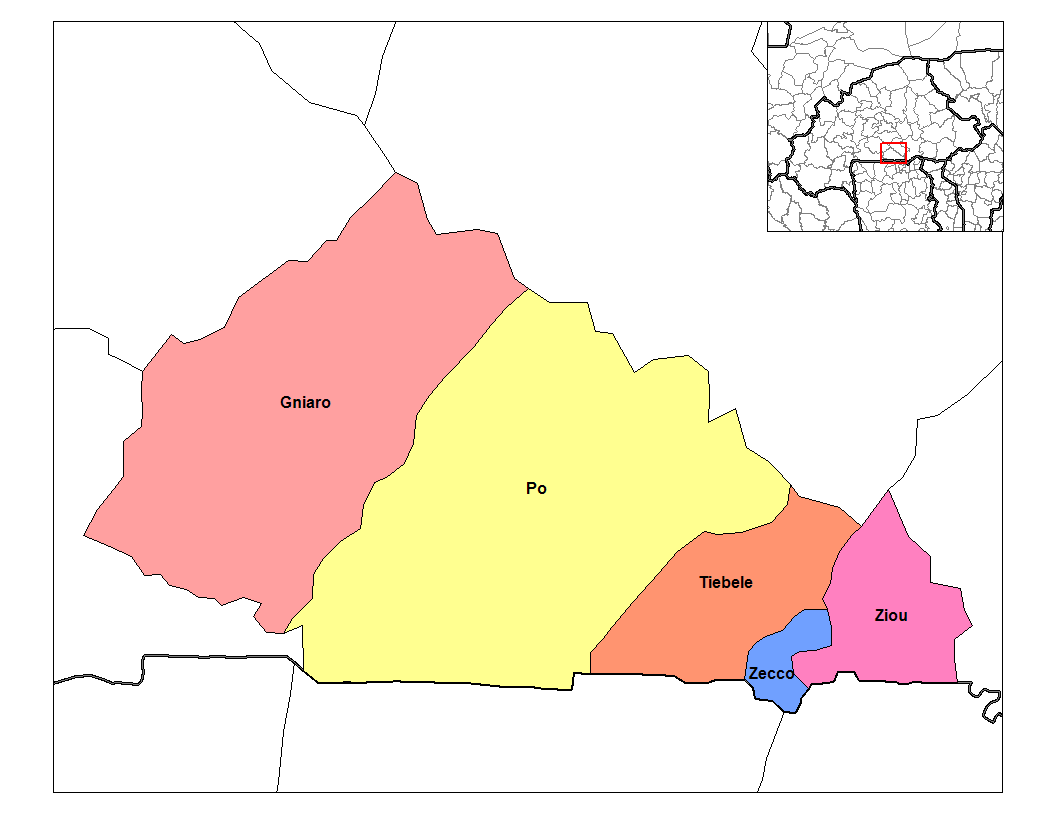
Location of the 5 departments (or communes) in Nahouri Province.

- Guiaro (rur.)
- Pô (urb.)
  (provincial capital)
- Tiébélé (rur.)
- Zecco (rur.)
- Ziou (rur.)

Zoundwéogo Province

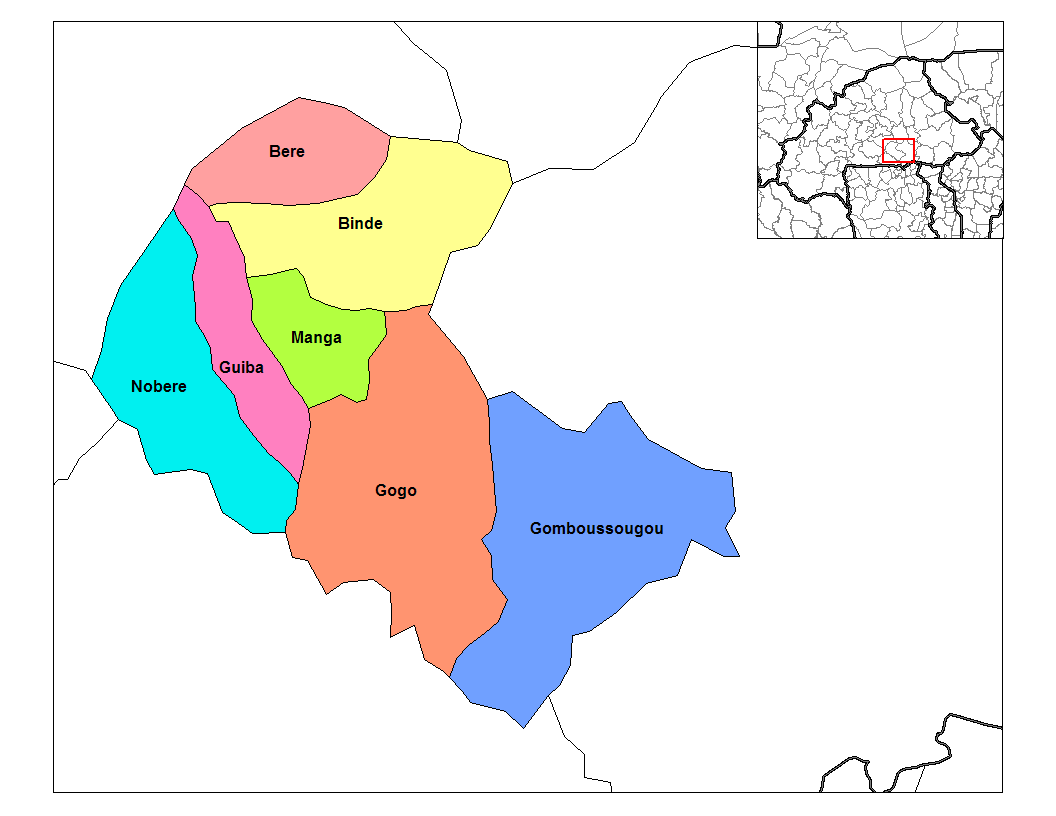
Location of the 7 departments (or communes) in Zoundwéogo Province.

- Béré (rur.)
- Bindé (rur.)
- Gogo (rur.)
- Gomboussougou (rur.)
- Guiba (rur.)
- Manga (urb.)
  (provincial and regional capital)
- Nobéré (rur.)

=== Centre-Ouest Region ===
Boulkiemdé Province

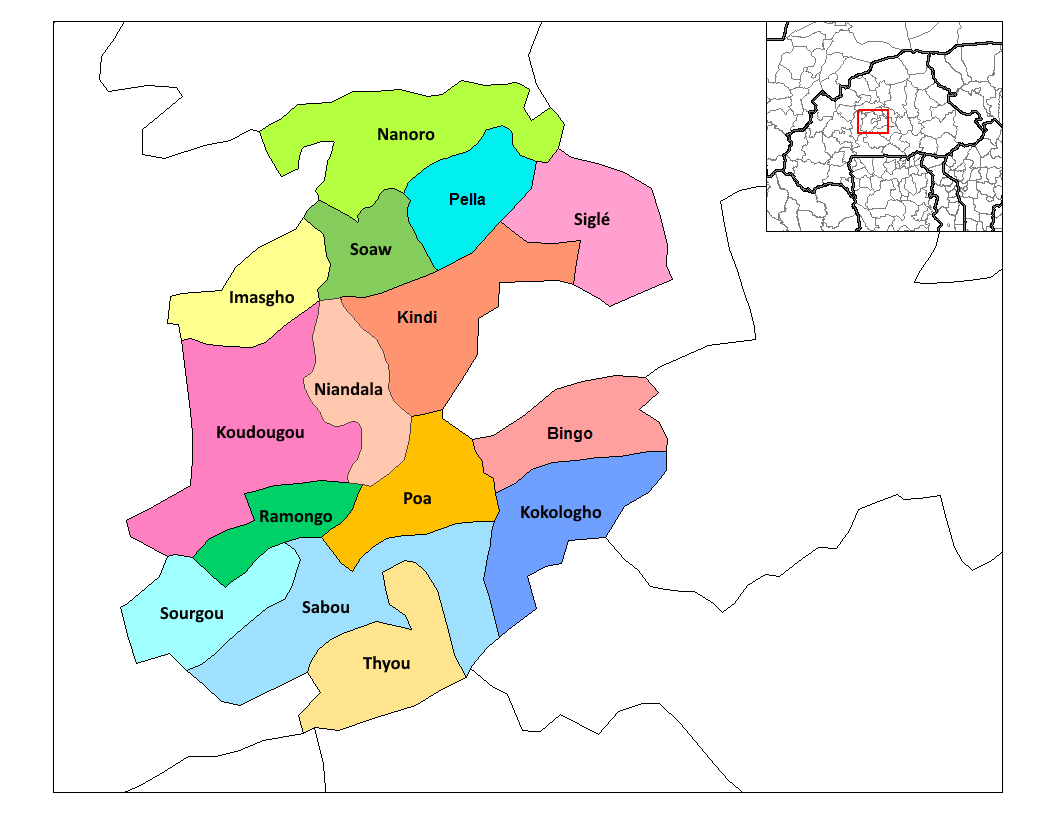
Location of the 15 departments (or communes) in Boulkiemdé Province.

- Bingo (rur.)
- Imasgo (rur.)
- Kindi (rur.)
- Kokologho (rur.)
- Koudougou (urb.)
  (provincial and regional capital)
- Nanoro (rur.)
- Nandiala (rur.)
- Pella (rur.)
- Poa (rur.)
- Ramongo (rur.)
- Sabou (rur.)
- Siglé (rur.)
- Soaw (rur.)
- Sourgou (rur.)
- Thyou (rur.)

Sanguié Province

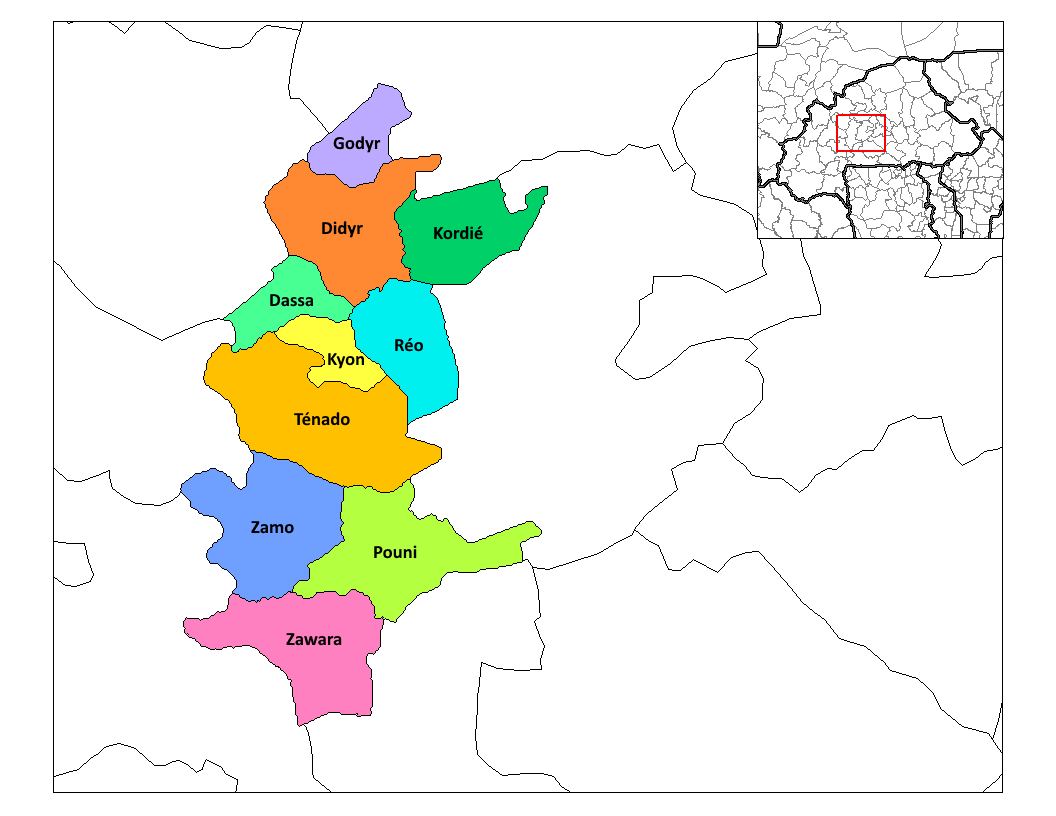
Location of the 10 departments (or communes) in Sanguié Province.

- Dassa (rur.)
- Didyr (rur.)
- Godyr (rur.)
- Kordié (rur.)
- Kyon (rur.)
- Pouni (rur.)
- Réo (urb.)
  (provincial capital)
- Ténado (rur.)
- Zamo (rur.)
- Zawara (rur.)

Sissili Province

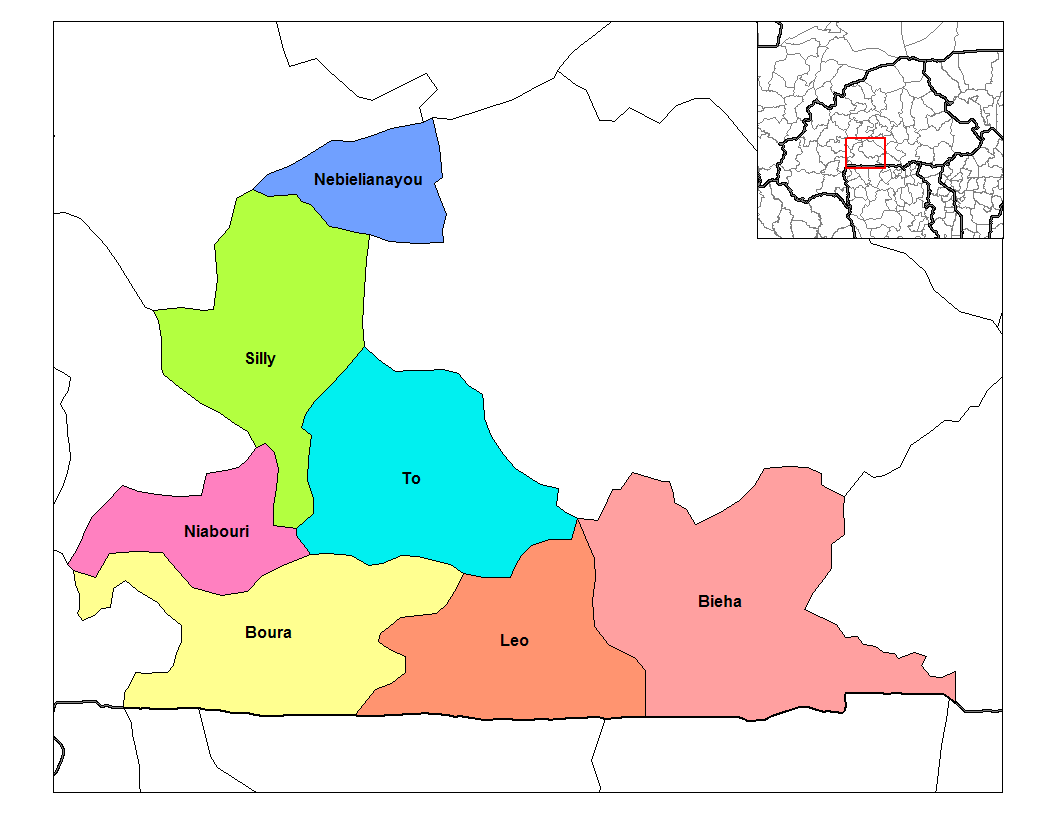
Location of the 7 departments (or communes) in Sissili Province.

- Biéha (rur.)
- Boura (rur.)
- Léo (urb.)
  (provincial capital)
- Nébiélianayou (rur.)
- Niabouri (rur.)
- Silly (rur.)
- Tô (rur.)

Ziro Province

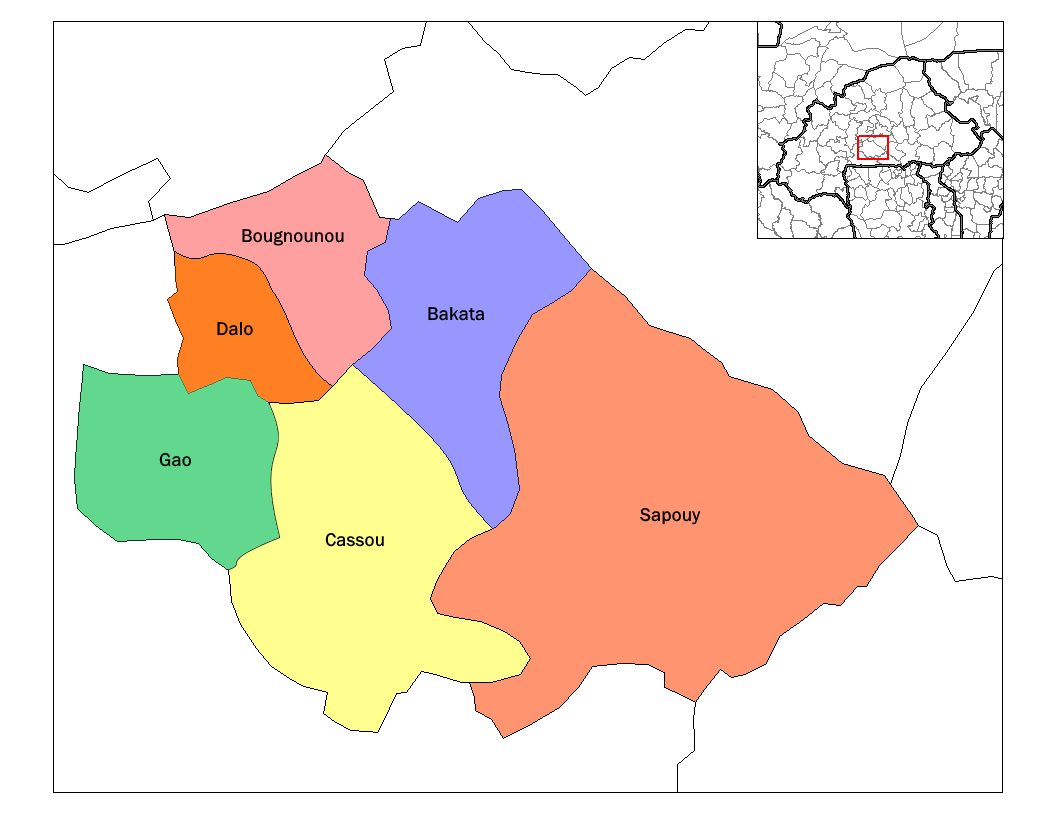
Location of the 6 departments (or communes) in Ziro Province.

- Bakata (rur.)
- Bougnounou (rur.)
- Cassou (rur.)
- Dalo (rur.)
- Gao (rur.)
- Sapouy (urb.)
  (provincial capital)

=== Hauts-Bassins Region ===
Houet Province

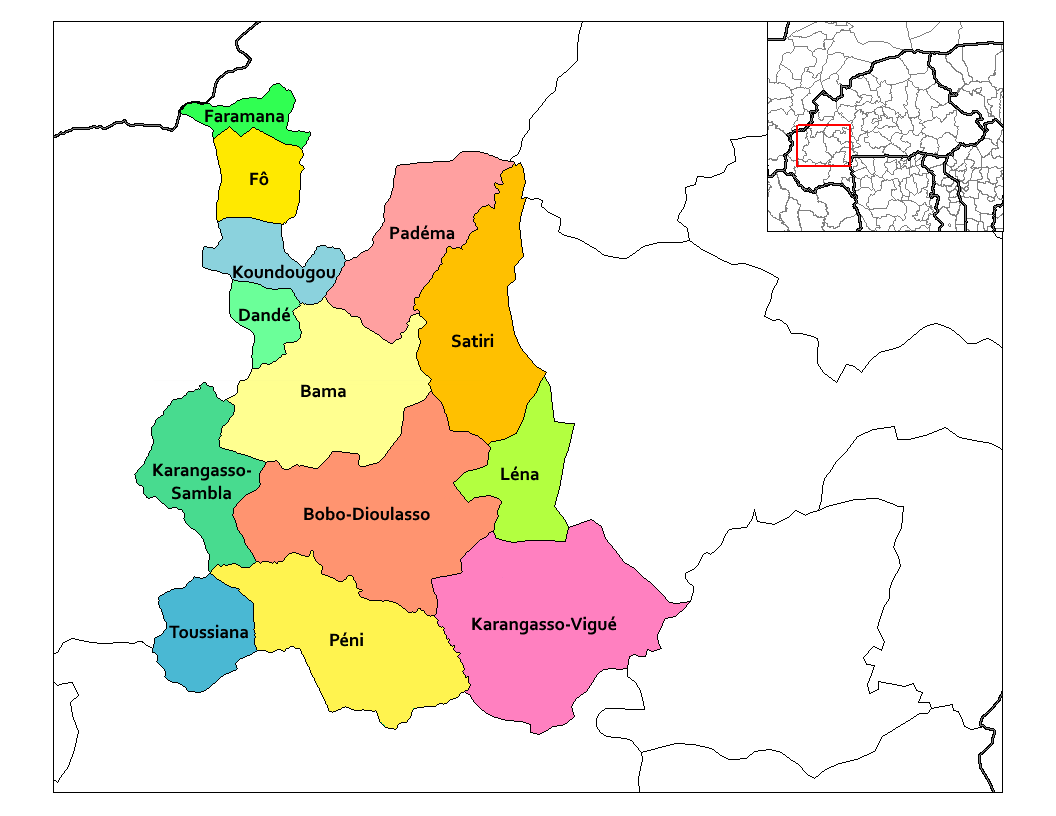
Location of the 13 departments (or communes) in Houet Province.

- Bama (rur.)
- Bobo-Dioulasso (urb.p.s.)
  (provincial and regional capital)
- Dandé (rur.)
- Faramana (rur.)
- Fô (rur.)
- Karangasso-Sambla (rur.)
- Karangasso-Vigué (rur.)
- Koundougou (rur.)
- Léna (rur.)
- Padéma (or Badéma, Badéna) (rur.)
- Péni (rur.)
- Satiri (rur.)
- Toussiana (rur.)

Kénédougou Province

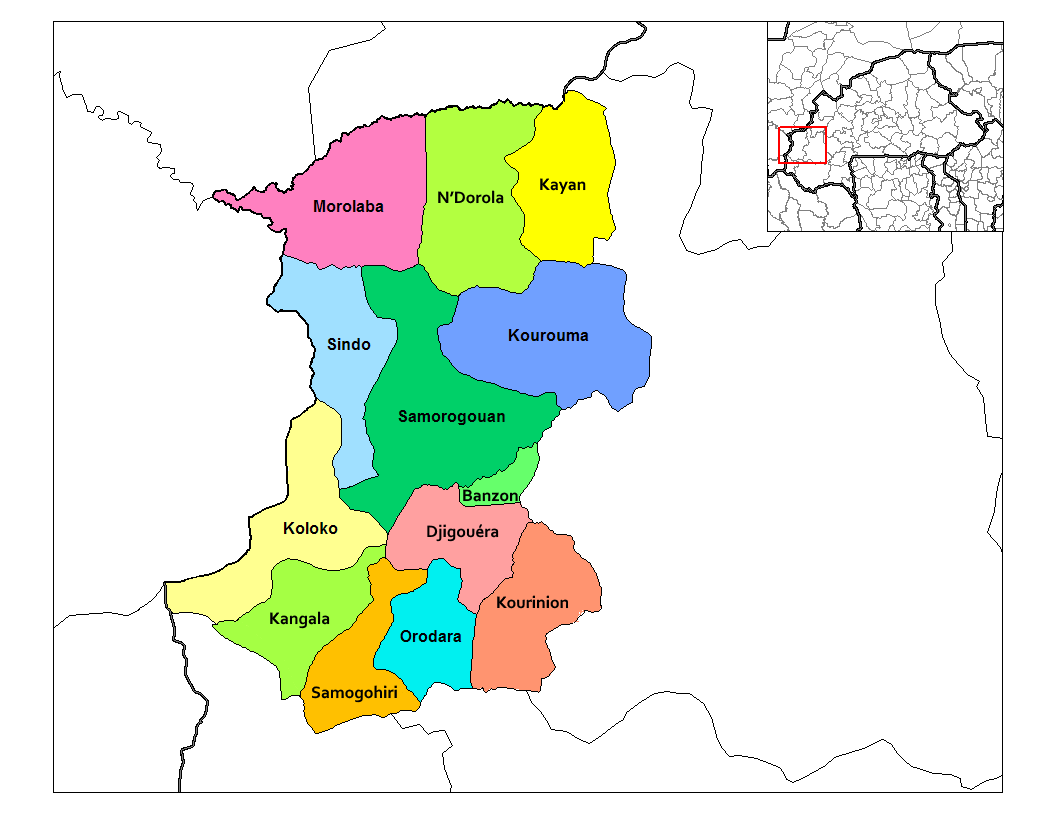
Location of the 13 departments (or communes) in Kénédougou Province.

- Banzon (rur.)
- Djigouéra (rur.)
- Kangala (rur.)
- Kayan (rur.)
- Koloko (rur.)
- Kourinion (rur.)
- Kourouma (rur.)
- Morolaba (rur.)
- N′Dorola (rur.)
- Orodara (urb.)
  (provincial capital)
- Samogohiri (rur.)
- Samorogouan (rur.)
- Sindo (rur.)

Tuy Province

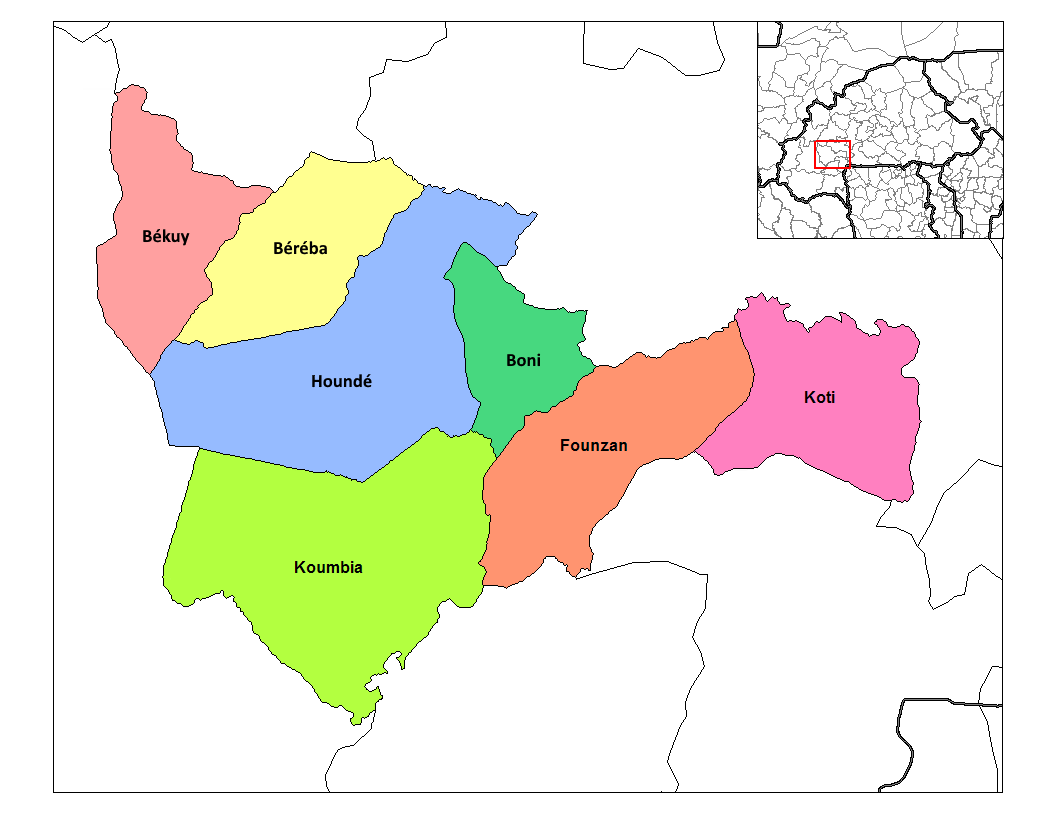
Location of the 7 departments (or communes) in Tuy Province.

- Békuy (rur.)
- Béréba (rur.)
- Boni (rur.)
- Founzan (rur.)
- Houndé (urb.)
  (provincial capital)
- Koti (rur.)
- Koumbia (rur.)

=== Boucle du Mouhoun Region ===
Balé Province

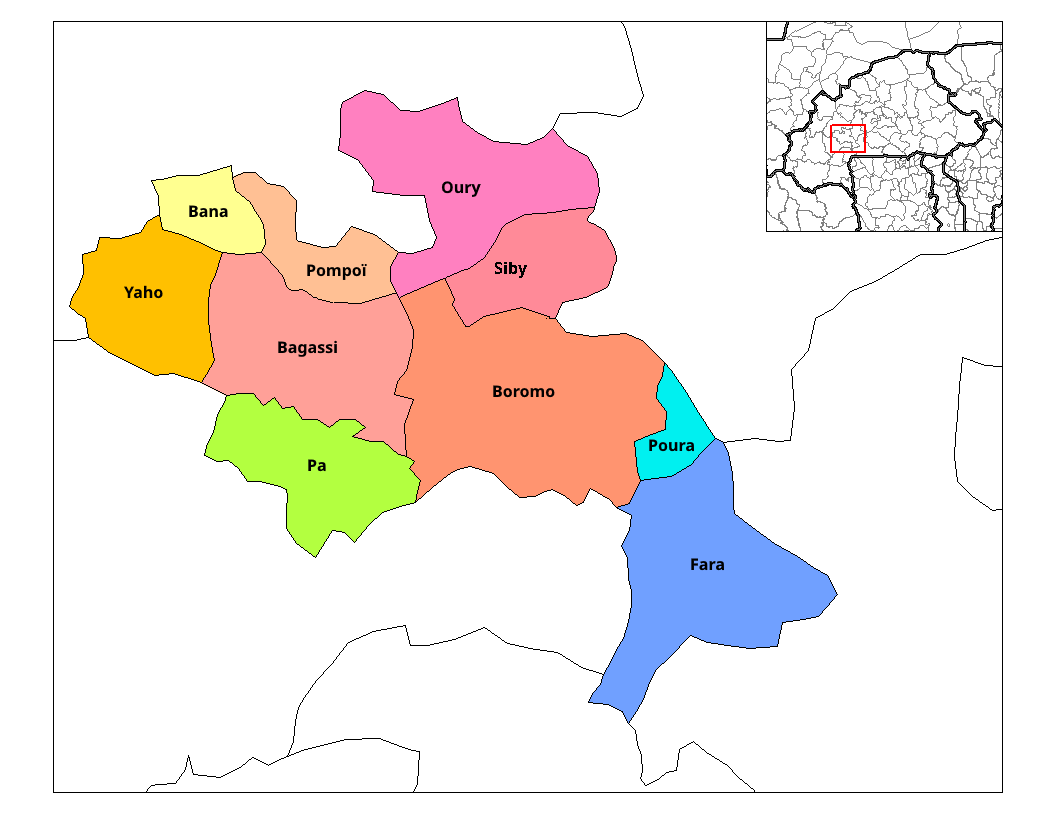
Location of the 10 departments (or communes) in Balé Province.

- Bagassi (rur.)
- Bana (rur.)
- Boromo (urb.)
  (provincial capital)
- Fara (rur.)
- Oury (rur.)
- Pâ (rur.)
- Pompoï (rur.)
- Poura (rur.)
- Siby (rur.)
- Yaho (rur.)

Banwa Province

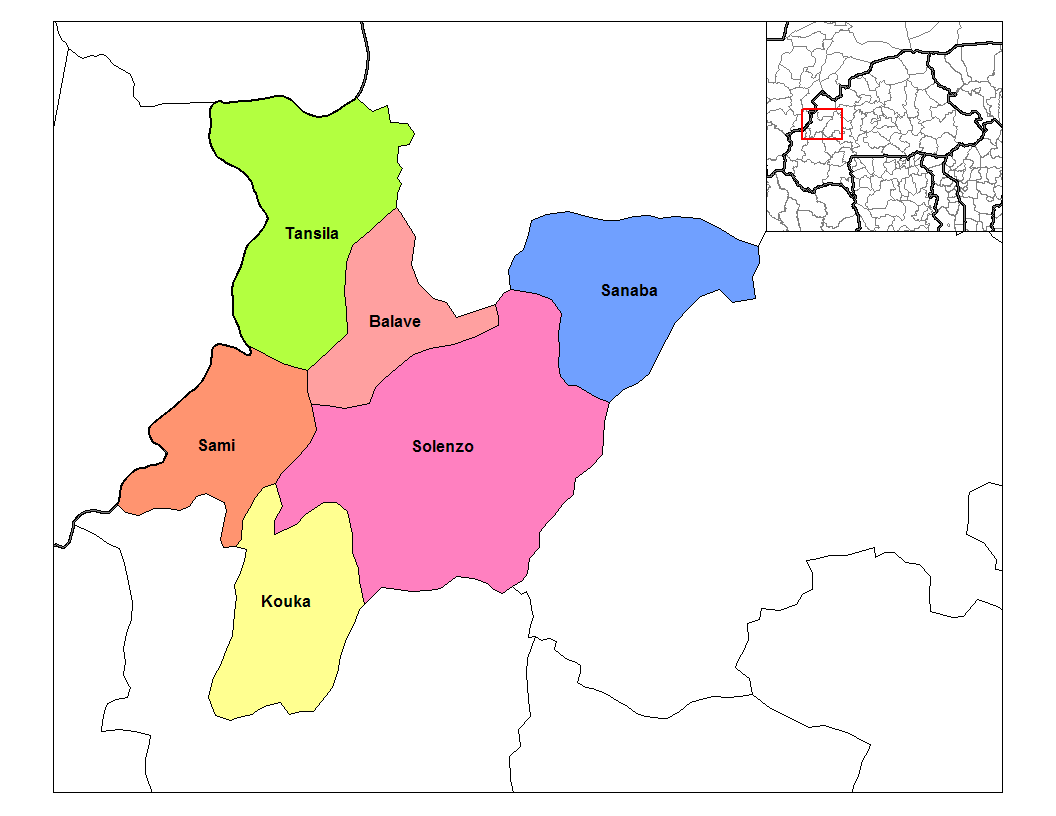
Location of the 6 departments (or communes) in Banwa Province.

- Balavé (rur.)
- Kouka (rur.)
- Sami (rur.)
- Sanaba (rur.)
- Solenzo (urb.)
  (provincial capital)
- Tansila (rur.)

Kossi Province

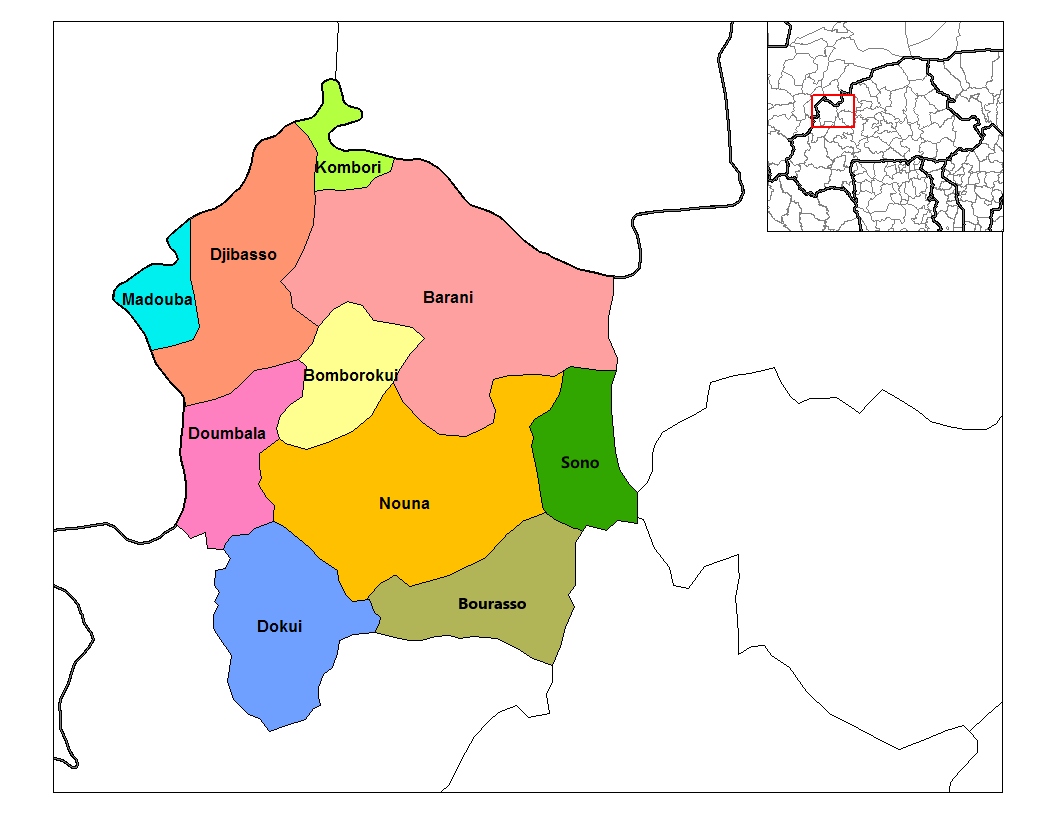
Location of the 10 departments (or communes) in Kossi Province.

- Barani (rur.)
- Bomborokui (rur.)
- Bourasso (rur.)
- Djibasso (rur.)
- Dokuy (rur.)
- Doumbala (rur.)
- Kombori (rur.)
- Madouba (rur.)
- Nouna (urb.)
  (provincial capital)
- Sono (rur.)

Mouhoun Province

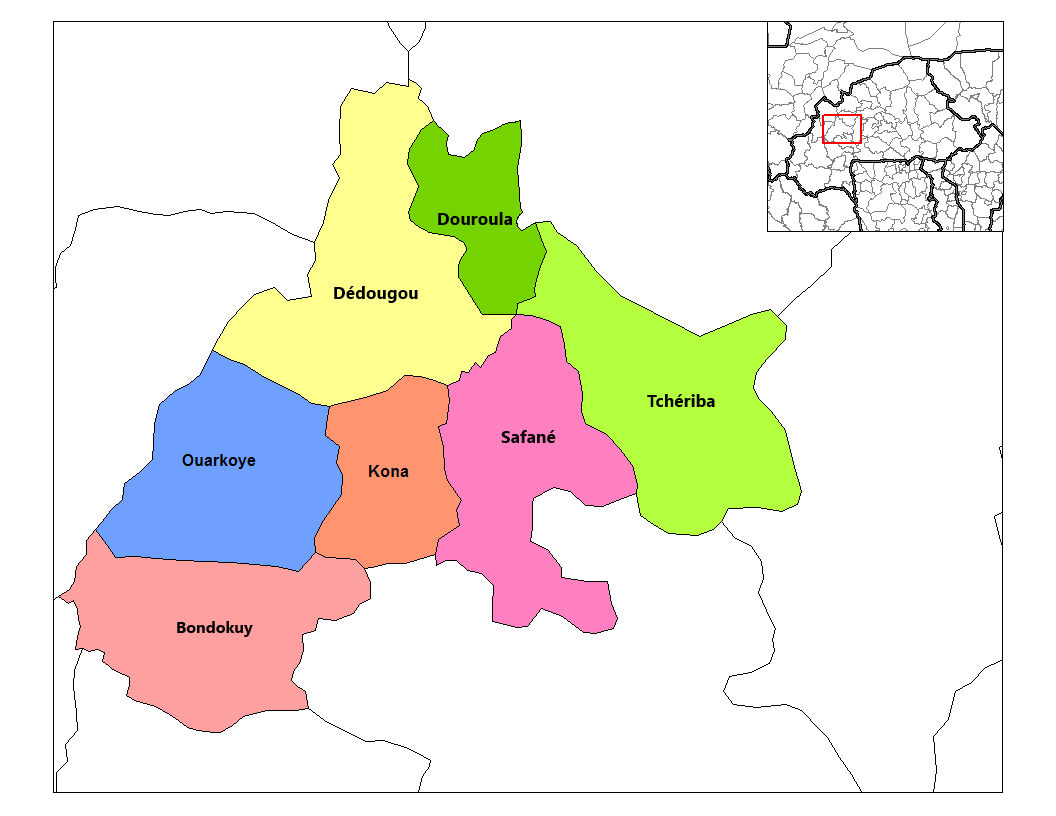
Location of the 7 departments (or communes) in Mouhoun Province.

- Bondokuy (rur.)
- Dédougou (urb.)
  (provincial and regional capital)
- Douroula (rur.)
- Kona (rur.)
- Ouarkoye (rur.)
- Safané (rur.)
- Tchériba (rur.)

Nayala Province

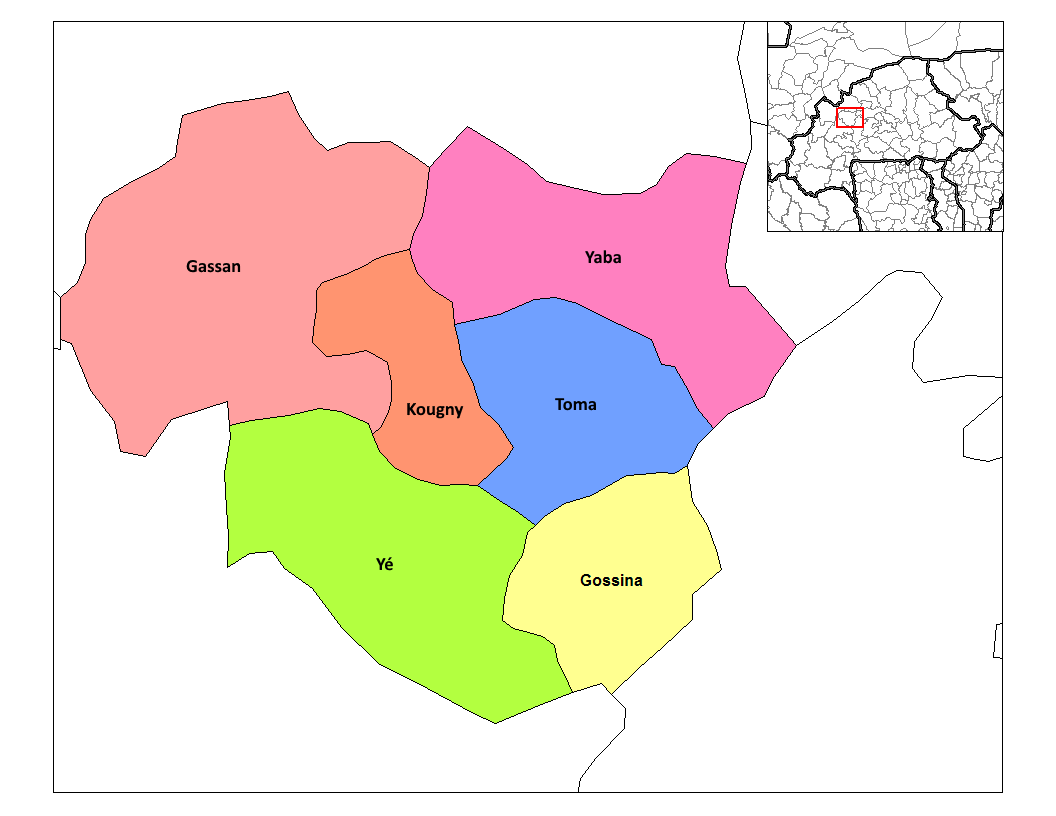
Location of the 6 departments (or communes) in Nayala Province.

- Gassam (rur.)
- Gossina (rur.)
- Kougny (rur.)
- Toma (urb.)
  (provincial capital)
- Yaba (rur.)
- Yé (rur.)

Sourou Province

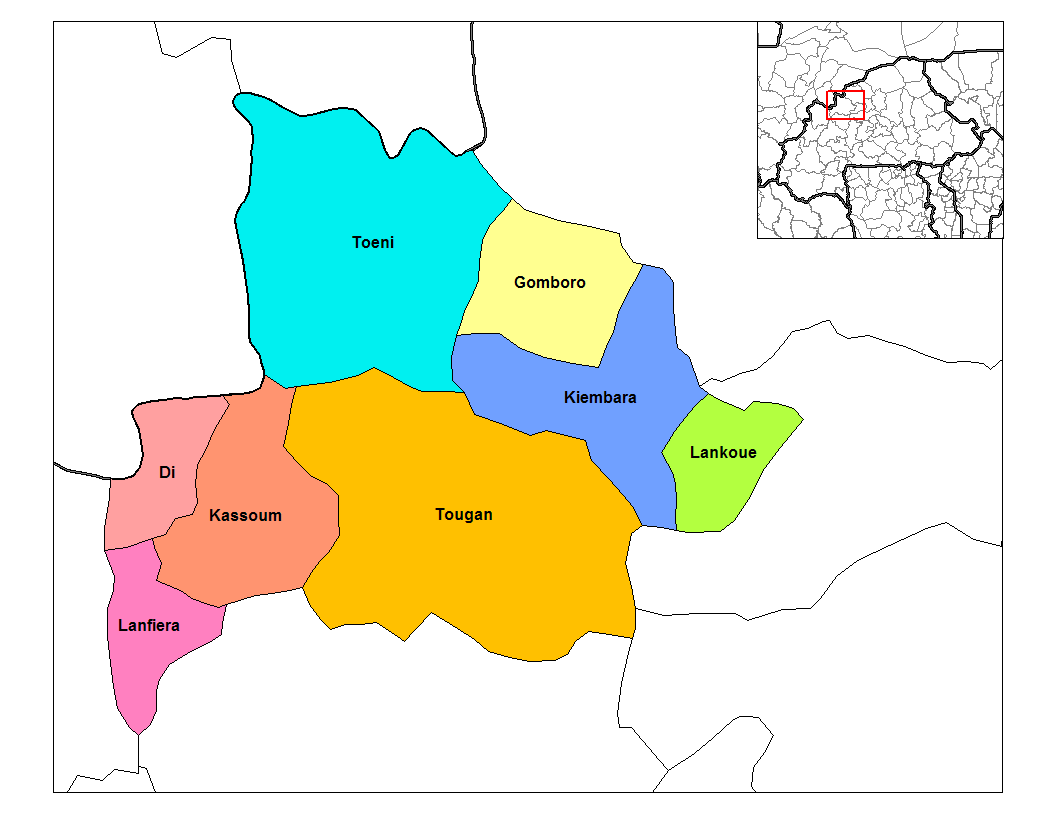
Location of the 8 departments (or communes) in Sourou Province.

- Di (rur.)
- Gomboro (rur.)
- Kassoum (rur.)
- Kiembara (rur.)
- Lanfièra (rur.)
- Lankoué (rur.)
- Toéni (rur.)
- Tougan (urb.)
  (provincial capital)

=== Cascades Region ===
Comoé Province

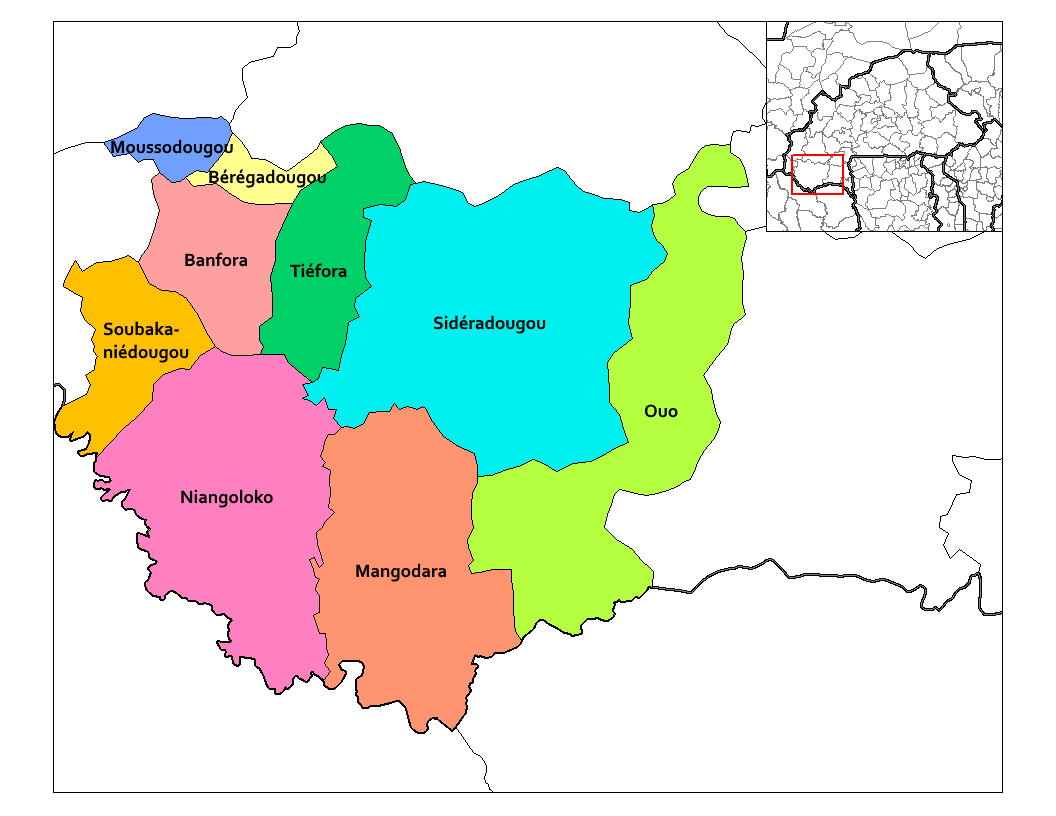
Location of the 9 departments (or communes) in Comoé Province.

- Banfora (urb.)
  (provincial and regional capital)
- Bérégadougou (rur.)
- Mangodara (rur.)
- Moussodougou (rur.)
- Niangoloko (urb.)
- Ouo (rur.)
- Sidéradougou (rur.)
- Soubakaniédougou (rur.)
- Tiéfora (rur.)

Léraba Province

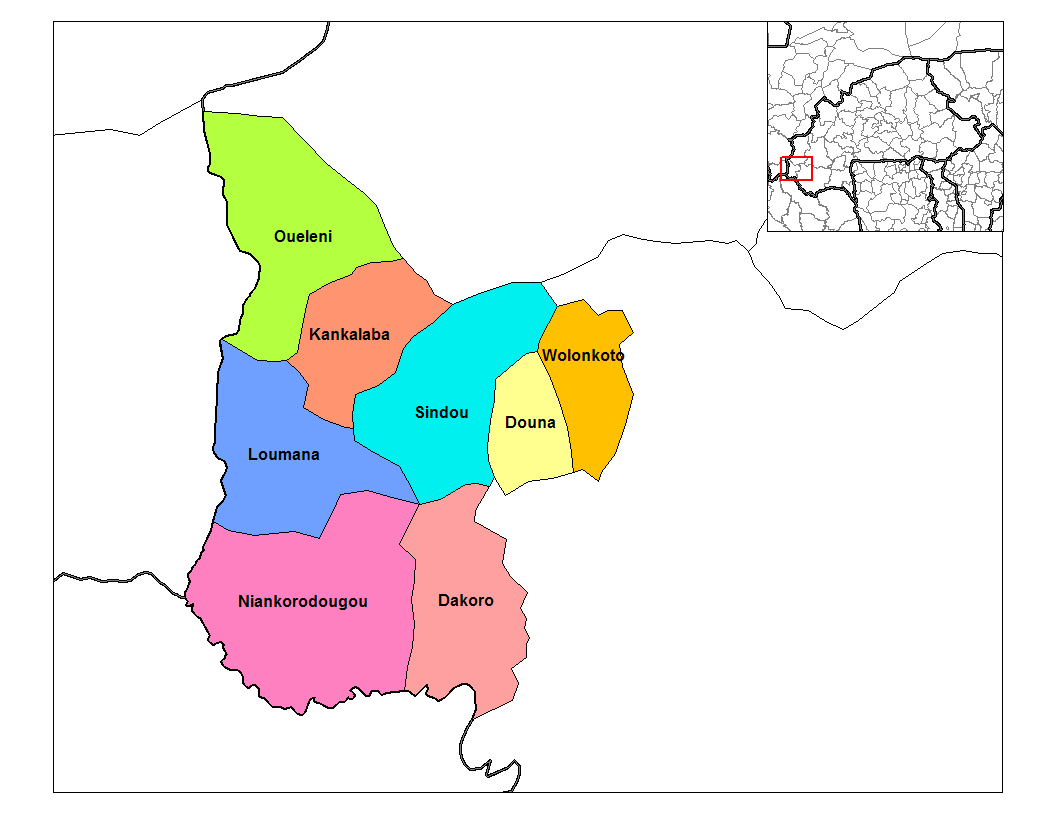
Location of the 8 departments (or communes) in Léraba Province.

- Dakoro (rur.)
- Douna (rur.)
- Kankalaba (rur.)
- Loumana (rur.)
- Niankorodougou (rur.)
- Ouéléni (rur.)
- Sindou (urb.)
  (provincial capital)
- Wolonkoto (rur.)

=== Sud-Ouest Region ===
Bougouriba Province

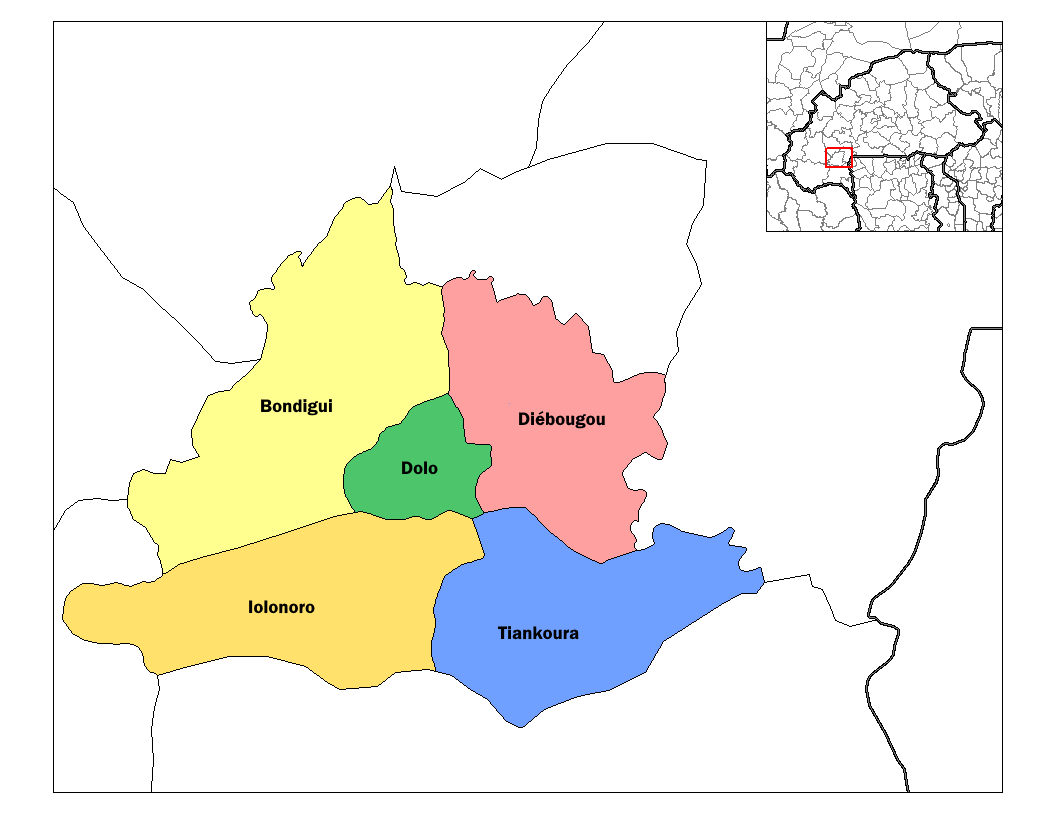
Location of the 5 departments (or communes) in Bougouriba Province.

- Bondigui (rur.)
- Diébougou (urb.)
  (provincial capital)
- Dolo (rur.)
- Iolonioro (rur.)
- Tiankoura (rur.)

Ioba Province

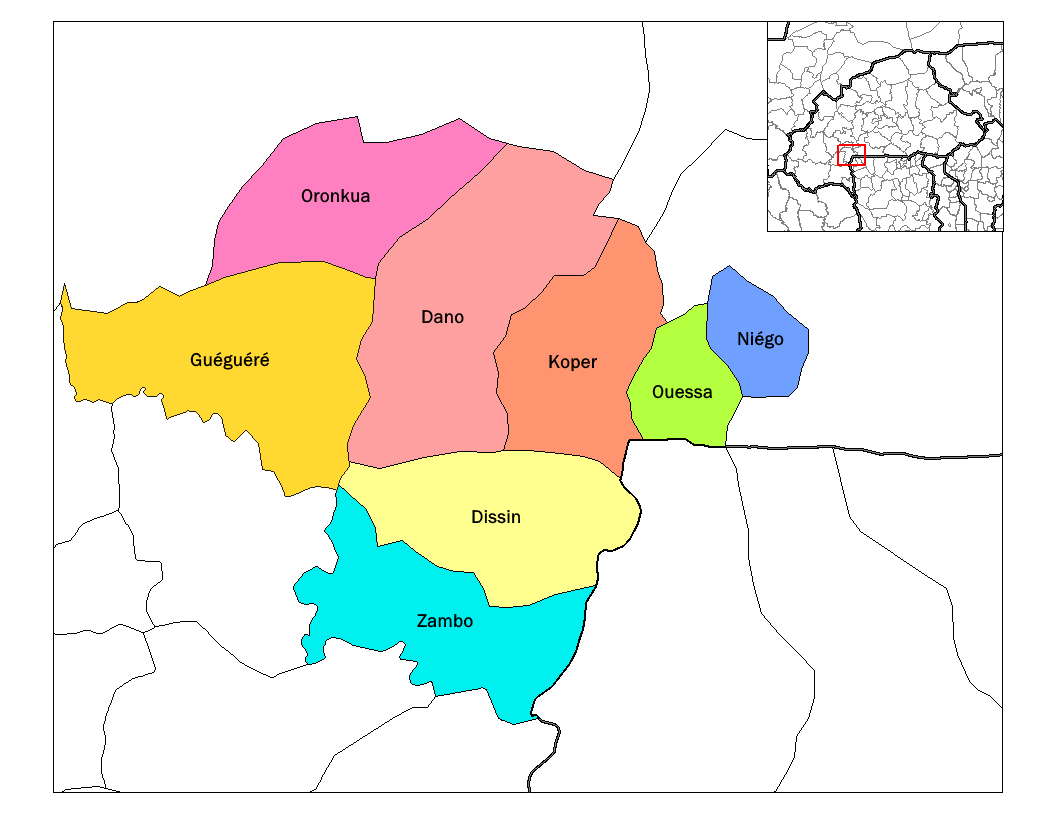
Location of the 8 departments (or communes) in Ioba Province.

- Dano (urb.)
  (provincial capital)
- Dissin (rur.)
- Guéguéré (rur.)
- Koper (rur.)
- Niégo (rur.)
- Oronkua (rur.)
- Ouessa (rur.)
- Zambo (rur.)

Noumbiel Province

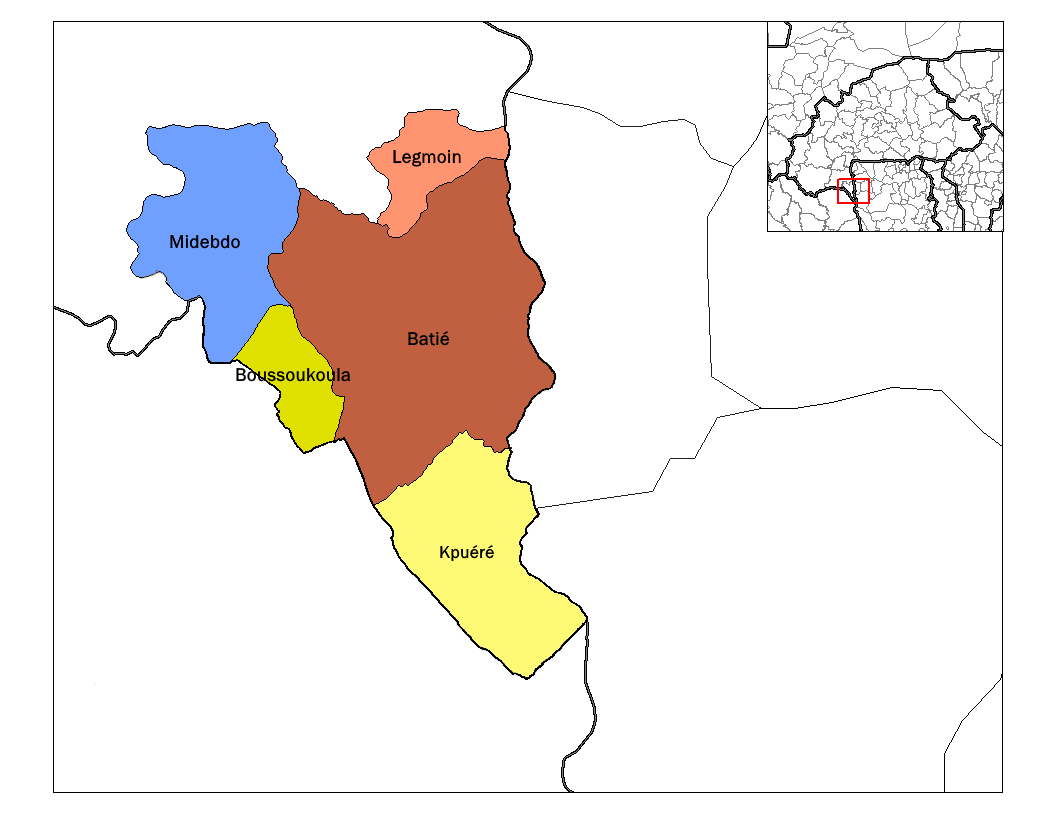
Location of the 5 departments (or communes) in Noumbiel Province.

- Batié (urb.)
  (provincial capital)
- Boussoukoula (rur.)
- Kpuéré (rur.)
- Legmoin (rur.)
- Midebdo (rur.)

Poni Province

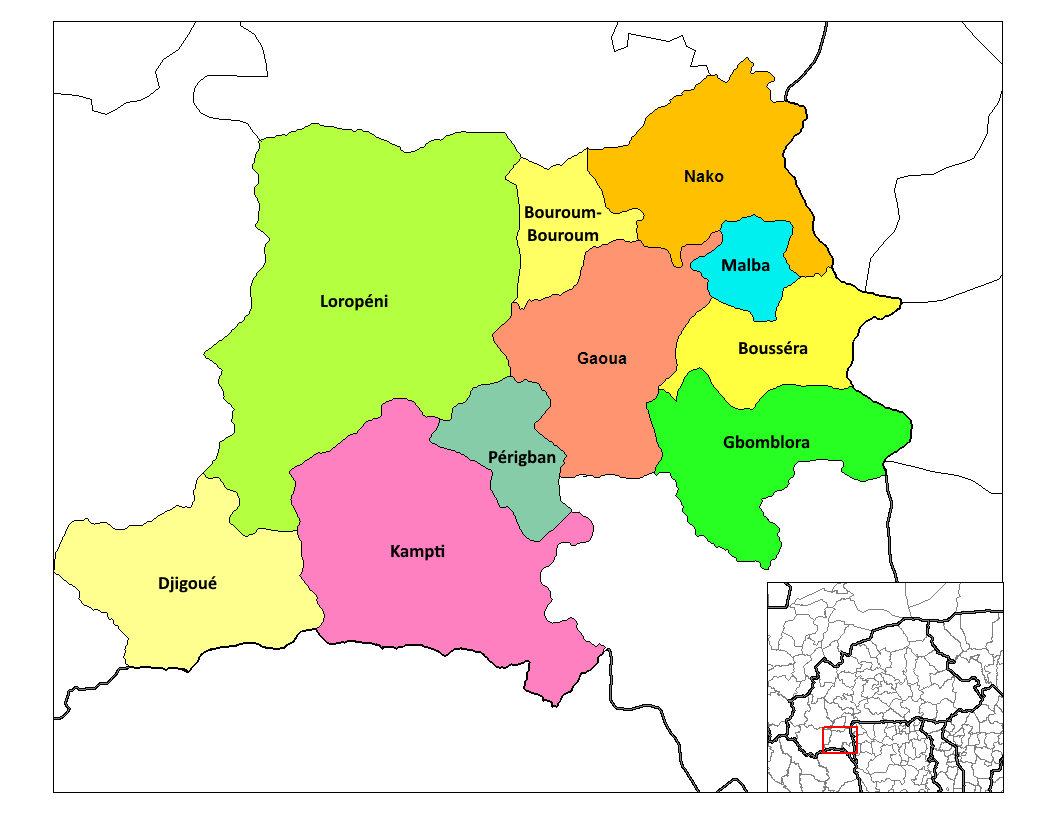
Location of the 10 departments (or communes) in Poni Province.

- Bouroum-Bouroum (rur.)
- Bousséra (rur.)
- Djigoué (rur.)
- Gaoua (urb.)
  (provincial and regional capital)
- Gbomblora (rur.)
- Kampti (rur.)
- Loropéni (rur.)
- Malba (rur.)
- Nako (rur.)
- Périgban (or Pérignan) (rur.)

== See also ==
- Provinces of Burkina Faso
- Regions of Burkina Faso
