= Morolaba Department =

Coordinates: 11°54′N 5°1′W

Morolaba
- Department
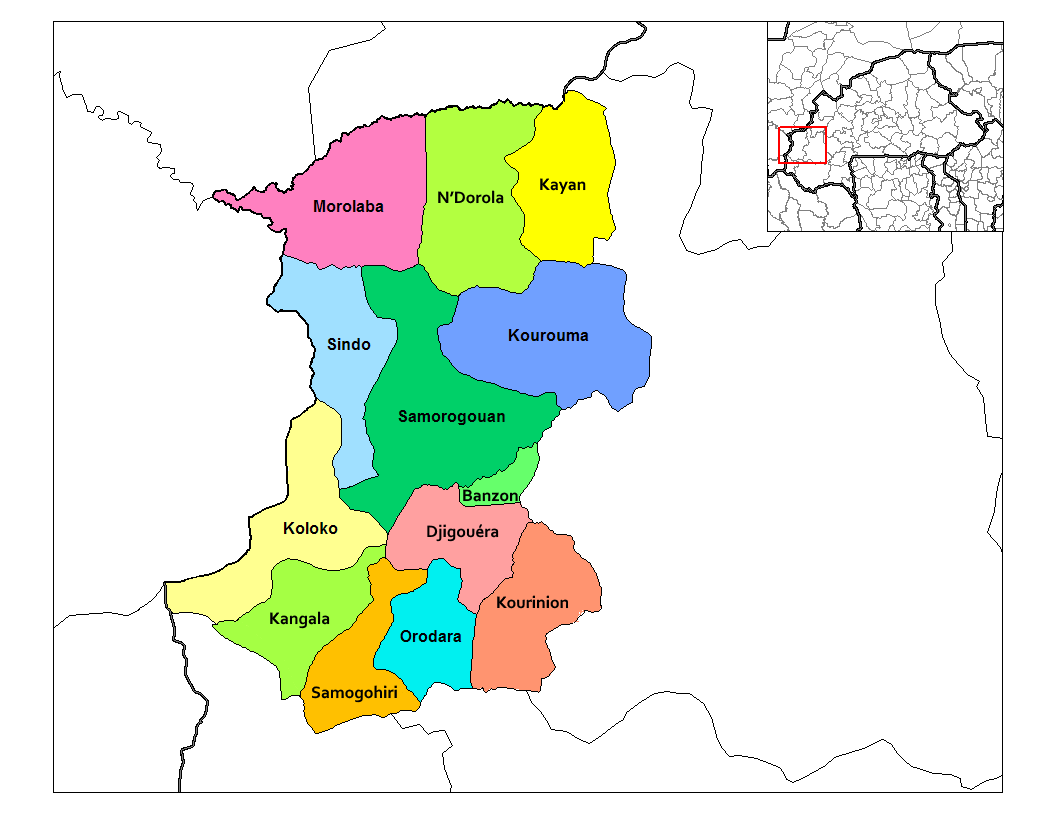
- Morolaba Department location in the province
- Country: Burkina Faso
- Province: Kénédougou Province
- Time zone: UTC+0 (GMT 0)

Morolaba is a department or commune of Kénédougou Province in south-western Burkina Faso. Its capital lies at the town of Morolaba.
