= 2019 attacks in Burkina Faso =

Part of the islamist insurgency in Burkina Faso

In 2019, there were many attacks in the African country Burkina Faso on both soldiers and civilians. These are contextualized by the ongoing Islamist insurgency in Burkina Faso.

== Silgadji ==
On 28 April 2019, a pastor, his two sons and two worshippers were killed at a Protestant church in Silgadji.

== Sanmatenga Province ==
On 12 May 2019, at least 20 attackers shot dead six people in a church in Dablo Department, Sanmatenga Province, Centre-Nord Region. Then they set fire to the church, a shop and two vehicles.

On 8 September 2019 in the Sanmatenga Province, Burkina Faso. In the Barsalogho Department, a vehicle transporting people and goods that was returning from a market drove over an improvised explosive device (IED). Fifteen passengers were killed and six were injured in the IED attack. Most of the victims were traders. Meanwhile, around 50 km to the east, a convoy with vans carrying provisions for people displaced by fighting was attacked by gunmen. In this attack, 14 people were killed. It is unknown who carried out these attacks.

== Oudalan Province ==
On the evening of Friday, 11 October 2019 a mosque in northern Burkina Faso was attacked, which left 16 people dead and two injured. It happened while the residents were praying inside the Grand Mosque in Salmossi, a village close to the border with Mali. AFP reported that 13 people died on the spot while three died later due to the injuries.

== Pobé Mengao ==
A mass shooting in Pobé Mengao killed 16 civilians.

== Fada N’Gourma Department ==
On 6 November 2019, gunmen ambushed a convoy transporting workers of the Canadian mining firm Semafo near the city of Fada N’Gourma, on a road to the firm's Boungou mine. At least 37 people were killed, and dozens more were missing or injured.

== Hantoukoura ==
On 1 December 2019, 14 people were killed at a Protestant church in Hantoukoura, Est Region.

== Arbinda ==
On 24 December 2019, a large group of militants on motorcycles attacked civilians and a military base in Arbinda, Soum Province, Burkina Faso. The attack and subsequent battle lasted several hours, resulting in the deaths of 35 civilians, 7 soldiers and 80 attackers. The attack was one of Burkina Faso's deadliest. A 48-hour state of mourning was declared after the attack.
