= Oumarou Kanazoé Dam =

Dam in Burkina Faso

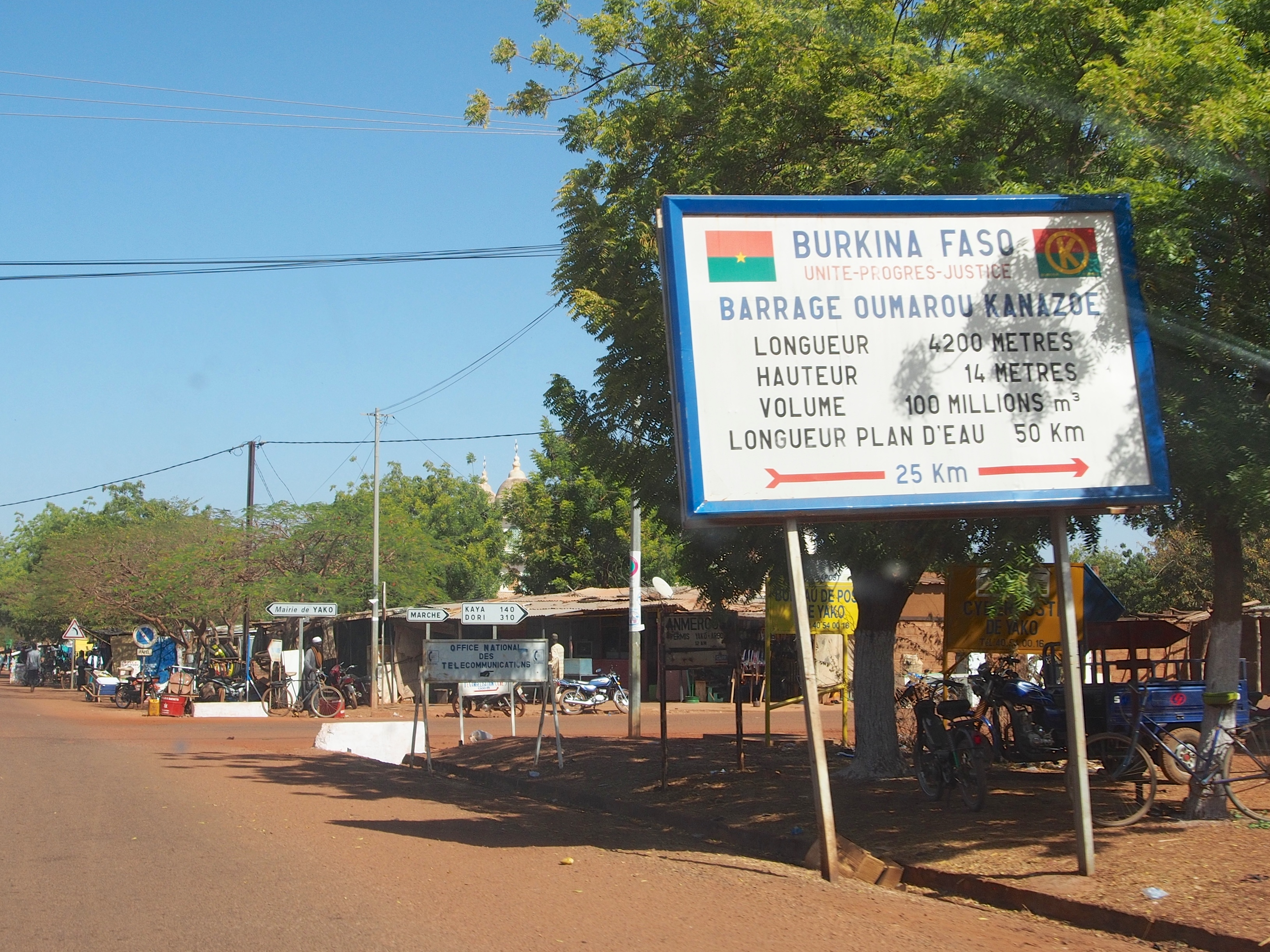
- Sign indicating the Oumarou Kanazoé Dam in Yako.

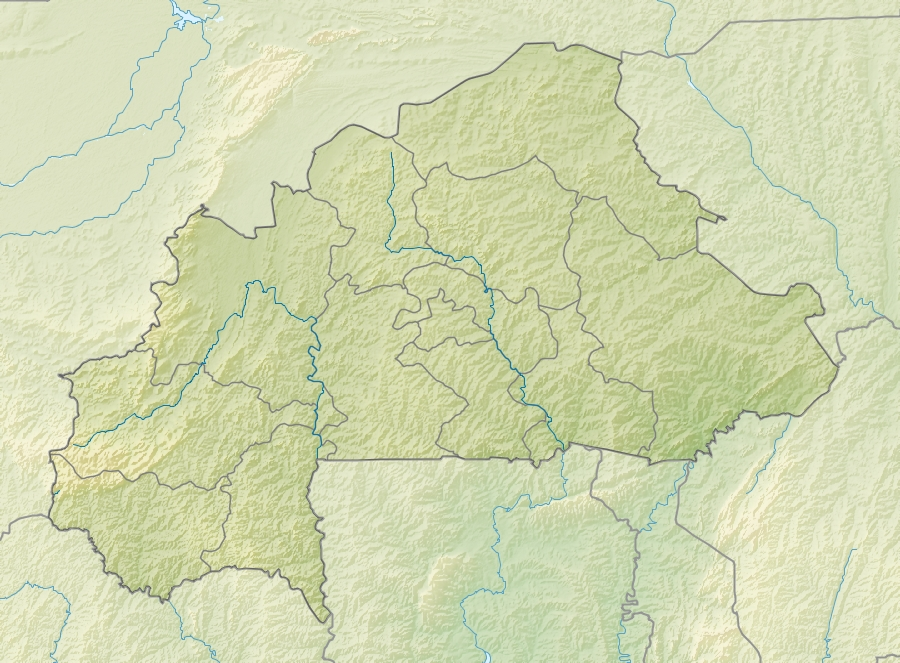
- Location of Oumarou Kanazoé Dam in Burkina Faso.
- Official name: Barrage de Toécé
- Country: Burkina Faso
- Location: Yatenga and Passoré Provinces, Nord Region
- Coordinates: 13°1′16″N 2°3′36″W
- Purpose: Irrigation, fishing
- Status: Operational
- Construction began: 1995
- Opening date: 1998

Dam and spillways
- Type of dam: Barrage
- Impounds: Nakanbé
- Length: 4.2 km (2.6 mi)

Reservoir
- Creates: Toécé Reservoir
- Total capacity: 90,600,000 m^{3} (73,500 acre⋅ft)
- Surface area: 5,000 ha (12,000 acres)

The Oumarou Kanazoé Dam (French: Barrage Oumarou Kanazoé), officially known as the Toécé Dam (French: Barrage de Toécé), is a dam straddling the border between Yatenga and Passoré Provinces in the Nord Region of Burkina Faso. It is named after Burkinabé entrepreneur Oumarou Kanazoé, whose construction company, Kanazoé Frères, built it in 1995. It contains the Nord Region's largest reservoir of water, which is used for irrigation and fishing. As of 2019, efforts were underway to clear the reservoir of invasive typha, which covers 50.6% of its surface area.
