= April 2022 Namissiguima attack =

Battle in Burkina Faso

- Part of Jihadist insurgency in Burkina Faso
Date	April 8, 2022
Location	Namissiguima, Sanmatenga Province, Burkina Faso
Result	JNIM victory

Belligerents
Burkina Faso: Burkina Faso Armed Forces; Volunteers for the Defense of the Homeland	Jama'at Nasr al-Islam wal Muslimin

Strength
Unknown	40

Casualties and losses
16 killed: 12 Burkinabe soldiers killed; 4 VDP killed; 21 injured	Unknown

On April 8, 2022, jihadists from Jama'at Nasr al-Islam wal-Muslimin ambushed a Burkinabe military base near the town of Namissiguima, in Sanmatenga Province, Burkina Faso.

== Prelude ==
In 2015, northern Burkina Faso became embroiled in a jihadist insurgency, after Islamist groups from eastern Mali infiltrated north and central provinces. Sanmatenga province became a hotspot of violence, with attacks in 2019 ramping up and killing dozens of people. In January 2022, the elected president Roch Marc Christian Kaboré was overthrown by disgruntled military captains led by Paul-Henri Sandaogo Damiba over Kabore's mismanagement of the war. Despite this, in March 2022, over 30 people were killed in jihadist attacks in northern Burkina Faso. The attack in Namissiguima was a response to battles in Barsalogho the previous day, where the Burkinabe army went on the offensive. In the battles, twenty jihadists were killed.

== Attack ==
Around 5:00 am on April 8, around 40 gunmen attacked the town of Namissiguima and its military base, setting fire to houses and the local market. The Burkinabe government stated that their forces took heavy losses in relation to the jihadists, but did not give a toll for jihadist casualties, although RFI claimed there were some killed. A local elected official in the area stated that the jihadists were attempting to free several of their comrades that had been captured during the offensive in Barsalogho.

== Casualties and aftermath ==
The Burkinabe government stated twelve Burkinabe soldiers were killed, along with four VDP. Twenty-one soldiers were injured as well. The government also stated the arrival of reinforcements to the area.
