= Faso Mêbo Agency =

- Agence Faso Mêbo

Agency overview
- Formed: January 22, 2026; 5 months ago
- Jurisdiction: Presidency of Burkina Faso
- Headquarters: Ouagadougou, Burkina Faso
- Motto: Let's build the nation Build our future with our own hands Build our country
- Website: fasomebo.gov.bf

The Faso Mêbo Agency (French: Agence Faso Mêbo), also known as the Faso Mêbo initiative (French: Initiative présidentielle Faso Mêbo), is a Burkinabè governmental initiative launched by President Ibrahim Traoré to modernize road infrastructure and urban spaces in Ouagadougou and other cities. It aims to use local materials and volunteer labor to reduce dependence on foreign aid.

== History ==
=== Faso Mêbo Initiative ===
On 16 October 2024, Initiative présidentielle Faso Mêbo was adopted by the Burkina Council of Ministers under President Ibrahim Traoré. The name roughly translated to "Build the Country," with a broad goal of revitalising Burkina Faso's infrastructure and civil facilities. On 27 March 2025, President Ibrahim Traoré handed over the first batch of over 900 heavy public-works vehicles and machines to the Faso Mêbo initiative. These machines included bulldozers, hydraulic and backhoe excavators, graders, road rollers, dump trucks, tank trucks, compactors, and concrete mixers. Additional vehicles included 4x4 pickup trucks, workshop and support vehicles, and also portable lighting units and high-intensity projectors. On 2 April 2025, 450 agents were recruited into the initiative during the first recruitment wave, and were sent to training a day later.

=== Faso Mêbo Agency ===
On 22 January 2026, the initiative became a public agency following a formal decision by the Council of Ministers, giving it administrative and financial autonomy. The transformation was intended to provide the programme with dedicated staff, budgets and planning authority to manage larger infrastructure projects. On 4 February 2026, 742 agents were listed as admissible and awaiting positions within the Faso Mêbo Agency. This was part of the second recruitment wave, consisting primarily of volunteers. On 9 February 2026, 686 positions that were available for recruitment were announced by the agency, including engineers, drivers, machine operators, and mechanics. This was part of the third recruitment wave, which took place in late February. On 25 February 2026, a digital donations and contribution management platform was launched by the Ministry of ICT as a new digital service supporting Faso Mêbo. On 4 May 2026, President Traoré handed an additional 776 heavy public-works vehicles, including semi-trailers, graders, compactors, hydraulic excavators, bulldozers, crushing and asphalt plants, crane trucks, and tankers. The vehicles were acquired using the country's own national treasury. Afterwards, the fleet was distributed to accelerate construction by launching four new regional development brigades in Tannounyan, Djôrô, Nando, and Nakambé.

== Activities and projects ==
Following the conversion from an initiative to a public agency, Faso Mêbo had increased their funding and planning capacity. At the end of January 2026, over 219 million FCFA had been collected through donations and infrastructure financing. Additionally, churches, ministries, and associations had donated cement, granite, paving materials, and construction tools. The Faso Mêbo Agency is reported to aim to pave between 3,000 and 5,000 km of roads per year across Burkina Faso.

== Brigades ==
The Faso Mêbo Agency currently governs eight civilian technical units, which can be deployed to handle specific infrastructure projects. The agency also acts as a massive practical school for young Burkinabè, turning unskilled youth into mechanics, surveyors, and topographers. In September 2025, Phase 1 of the brigades were launched in: Yaadga, Koulsé, Goulmoum and Bankui. Phase 2 was launched in May 2026 in: Tannounyan, Djôrô, Nando, and Nakambé.

== Projects ==
Project	Location	Size	Announcement date	Expected completion	Cost
Major
Ouagadougou–Bobo-Dioulasso Expressway	Yimdi near Ouagadougou to Bobo-Dioulasso	332-kilometre (206 mi)	16 December 2025		CFA 200 billion (about US$357 million)
Minor
Gay Baongo Road Rehabilitation	Tampouy, Ouagadougou, Kadiogo Province	1.3-kilometre (0.81 mi)	September 2025		
Asphalting of Kaya–Barsalogho Road	Kaya to Barsalogho in Sanmatenga Province	42-kilometre (26 mi)	10 December 2024		
