= Tampouy =

Town in Centre, Burkina Faso

- Rural commune
- Location in Burkina Faso
- Coordinates: 13°00′37″N 1°59′50″W
- Country: Burkina Faso
- Region: Nord Region
- Province: Passore Province
- Department: Kirsi Department

Tampouy is a village in the Kirsi Department of Passore Province in northern-central Burkina Faso.
