= Korsimoro =

- Location within Burkina Faso
- Coordinates: 12°49′30″N 01°04′02″W
- Country: Burkina Faso
- Region: Centre-Nord
- Province: Sanmatenga
- Department: Korsimoro

Population (2019 census)
  - Total: 18,875
- Time zone: UTC+0 (GMT)

Korsimoro is a town and the capital of the Korsimoro Department, in the Sanmatenga Province of central Burkina Faso. It is situated 70 km NNE of Ouagadougou on the main road (Route Nationale 3) to Kaya. It had a population of 18,875 (2019).
