= Loroum Province =

Coordinates: 13°46′N 2°04′W

Loroum
- Province
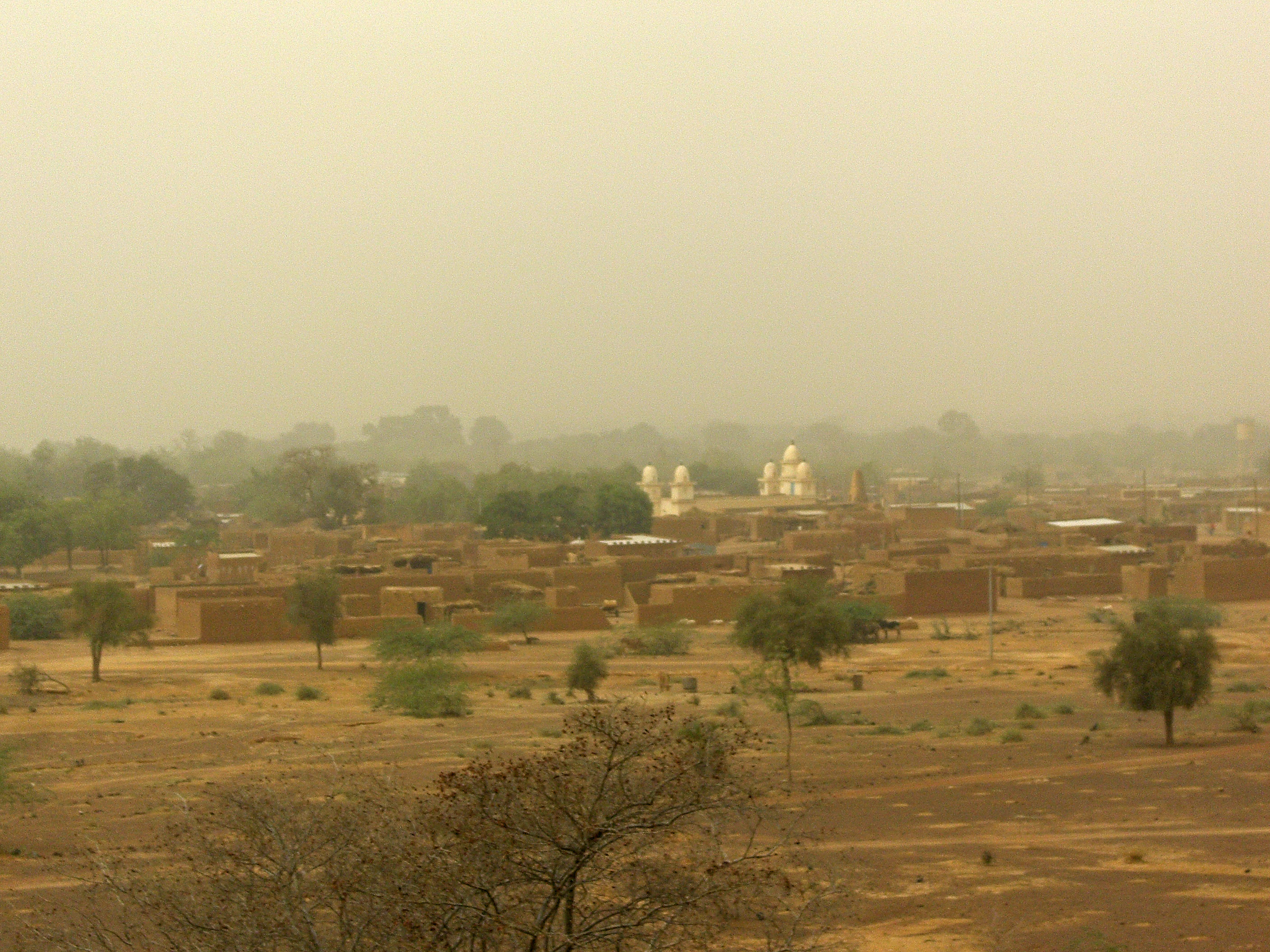
- Titao is Loroum's capital.

- Location in Burkina Faso

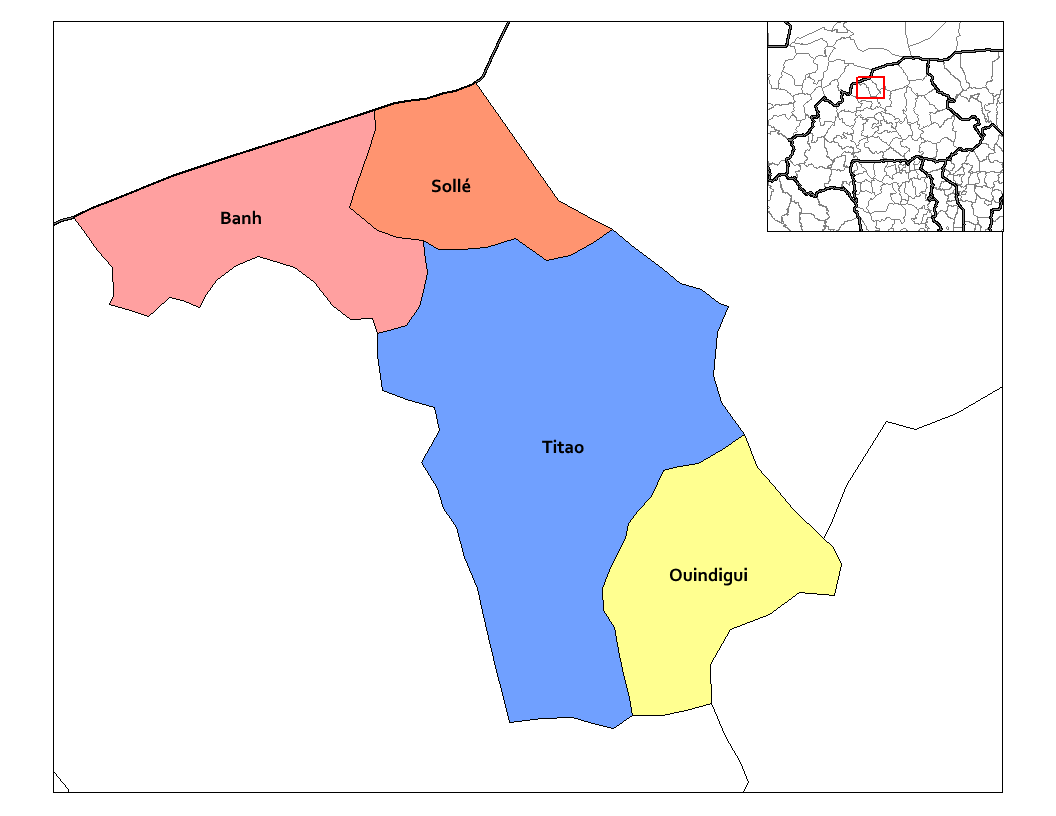
- Provincial map of its departments
- Country: Burkina Faso
- Region: Nord Region
- Capital: Titao

Area
  - Province: 3,587 km^{2} (1,385 sq mi)

Population (2019)
  - Province: 198,192
  - Density: 55.25/km^{2} (143.1/sq mi)
  - Urban: 48,241
- Time zone: UTC+0 (GMT 0)

Loroum is one of the 45 provinces of Burkina Faso, a landlocked country in West Africa. It is located in its Nord Region with its seat at the city of Titao. As of 2019, it had a population of 198,192 inhabitants. The province experiences a tropical climate with distinct wet and dry seasons, and its economy is primarily based on agriculture.

== History ==
The region has a history that includes the presence of early hunter-gatherer societies dating back to the Neolithic Age. Various ethnic groups, including the Mossi, Fula, and Dioula, settled in the area in successive waves between the 8th and 15th centuries CE. The territory came under French control, becoming a French protectorate in 1896. It became part of Republic of Upper Volta in 1958 and later as a part of Burkina Faso.

== Geography ==
Loroum is one of the 45 provinces of Burkina Faso, a landlocked country in West Africa. It is located in northern Burkina Faso within the Nord Region and spans approximately 3,587 km^{2} (1,385 sq mi). It is bordered by Passoré, Yatenga, and Zondoma provinces, and the seat is at the city of Titao. The province, consistent with much of northern Burkina Faso, experiences a tropical climate characterized by distinct wet and dry seasons, with erratic rainfall. Loroum is divided into 4 departments–Banh Department, Ouindigui Department, Solle Department, and Titao Department.

== Demographics ==
As of 2019, it had a population of 198,192 inhabitants. The demographics is made up of various ethnicities. In 2011, the province had 192 primary schools and 12 secondary schools. The province had 20 health and social promotion centers (Centres de santé et de promotion sociale), 3 doctors and 52 nurses.

== See also ==
- Regions of Burkina Faso
- Provinces of Burkina Faso
- Departments of Burkina Faso
