= Boussouma Department =

Boussouma Department may refer to:

- Boussouma Department, Sanmatenga, Burkina Faso
- Boussouma Department, Boulgou, Burkina Faso
