= Namissiguima =

Namissiguima can refer to:

- Namissiguima Department, Sanmatenga, Burkino Faso
- Namissiguima Department, Yatenga, Burkina Faso
