= Boussouma =

Village in Sabce Department, Burkina Faso

- Location in Burkina Faso
- Coordinates: 13°13′N 1°32′W
- Country: Burkina Faso
- Region: Centre-Nord Region
- Province: Sanmatenga Province
- Department: Boussouma Department

Population (2019)
  - Total: 1,544
- Time zone: +2

Boussouma is a town in the Boussouma Department of Sanmatenga Province in northern-central Burkina Faso.

Population
Year	Pop.	±%
1985	927	—
2006	1,051	+13.4%
2019	1,544	+46.9%
