= Sanrgo =

- Location in Burkina Faso
- Coordinates: 13°12′56″N 1°01′35″W
- Country: Burkina Faso
- Region: Centre-Nord
- Province: Sanmatenga
- Department: Kaya

Population
  - Total: 2,239 inhabitants

Sanrgo is a rural settlement situated in Kaya department, Sanmatenga province, in the region of Centre-Nord in Burkina Faso.

== Geography ==
Sanrgo is located 3 kilometres north of Kalambaogo and 13 km northeast from Kaya city, the capital of the department. The village lies on the departmental road 18 between Kaya and Barsalogho.

== History ==
Since 2015, the country has been embroiled in an Islamist uprising, leading to several conflicts between Fulani and Mossi communities fleeing massacres to the south. In October 2019, hundreds of internally displaced people fled to Sanrgo.

In 2020, six people were arrested by a civilian militia, Volontaires de la Défenses (VDP) for allegedly contacting jihadists.

== Education and health ==
The closest health centre to Sanrgo is the Kalambaogo Health and Social Promotion Centre while the Regional Hospital Centre (CHR) is located in Kaya.

The village possesses two elementary public schools. The nearest College of General Education is in Kalambaogo.
