= Titao Department =

Coordinates: 13°46′N 2°04′W

Titao
- Department
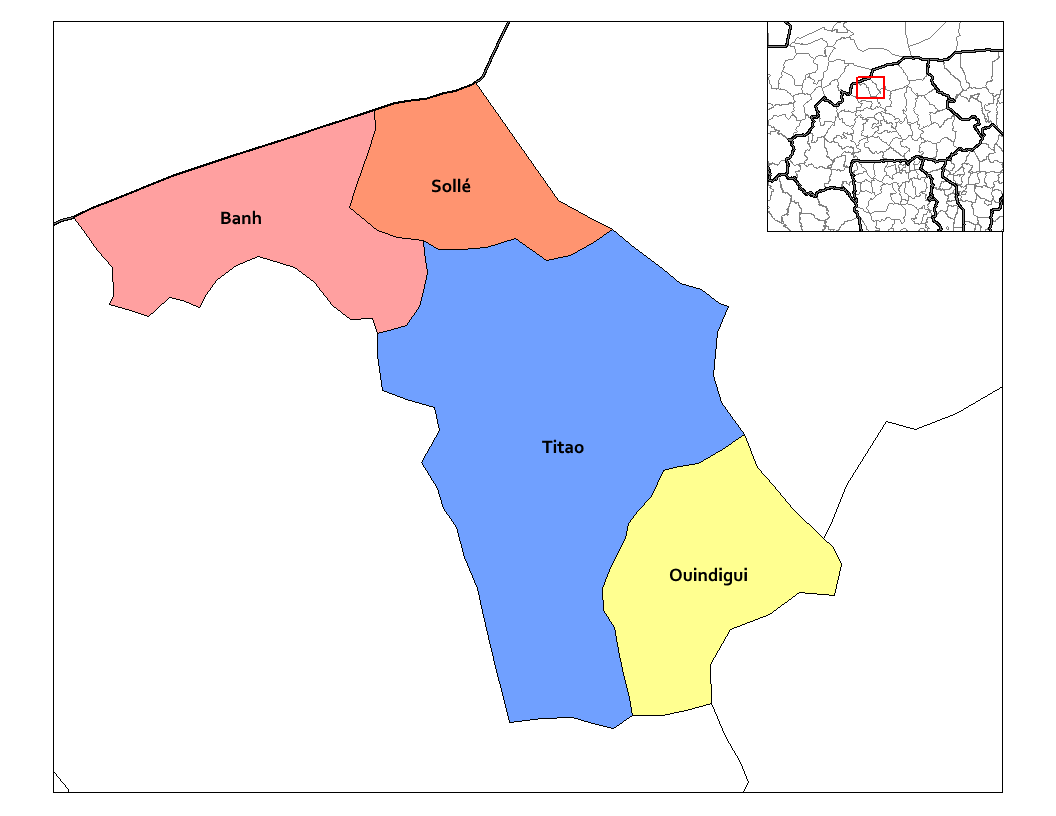
- Titao Department location in the province
- Country: Burkina Faso
- Province: Loroum Province

Area
  - Department: 618 sq mi (1,601 km^{2})

Population (2019 census)
  - Department: 104,963
  - Density: 169.8/sq mi (65.56/km^{2})
  - Urban: 48,241
- Time zone: UTC+0 (GMT 0)

Titao is a department or commune of Loroum Province in north-western Burkina Faso. Its capital is the town of Titao.
