= Mané, Burkina Faso =

Mané is a town in Burkina Faso. It is the capital of Mane Department in Sanmatenga Province. Mané one of the Mossi principalities and was founded in the 16th century.
