= Yako Department =

Coordinates: 12.95°N 2.26667°W

Yako
- Department
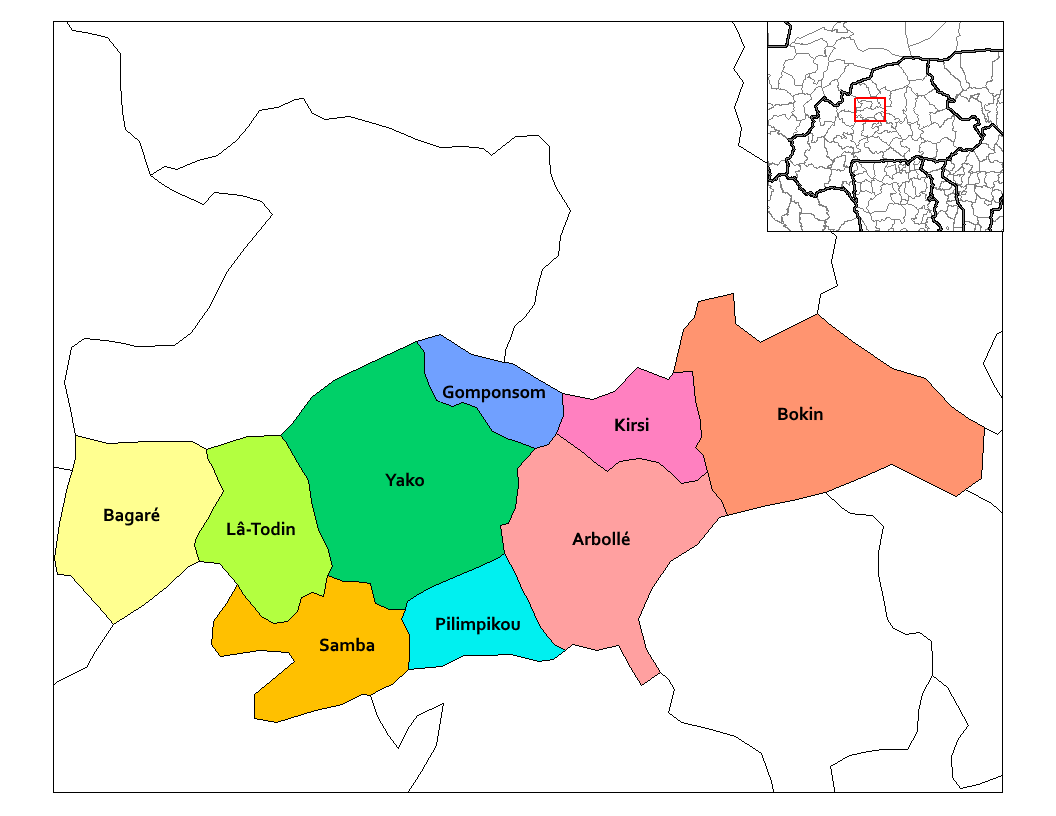
- Yako Department location in the province
- Country: Burkina Faso
- Province: Passoré Province

Area
  - Department: 303 sq mi (785 km^{2})

Population (2019 census)
  - Department: 117,403
  - Density: 387/sq mi (150/km^{2})
  - Urban: 38,679
- Time zone: UTC+0 (GMT 0)

Yako is a department or commune of Passoré Province in north central Burkina Faso. Its capital is the town of Yako.
