= Pissila Department =

Coordinates: 13.1700°N 0.8170°W

Pissila
- Department
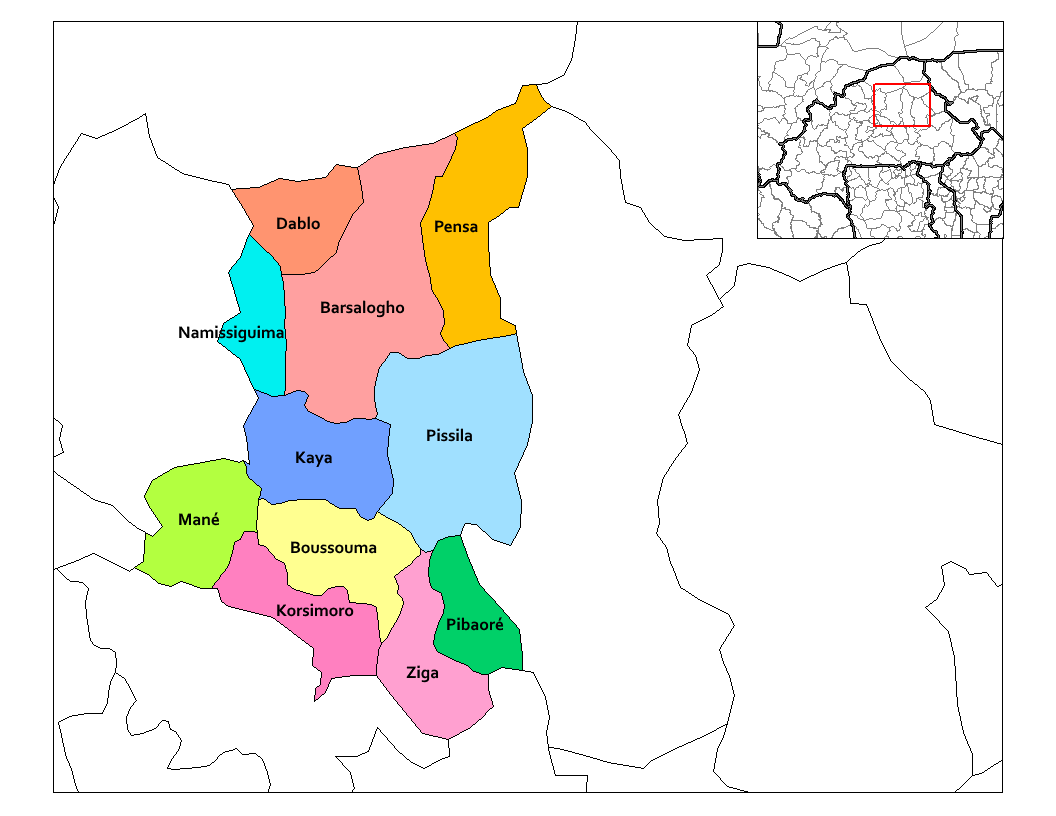
- Pissila Department location in the province
- Country: Burkina Faso
- Province: Sanmatenga Province

Area
  - Total: 601 sq mi (1,557 km^{2})

Population (2019 census)
  - Total: 146,671
  - Density: 244.0/sq mi (94.20/km^{2})
- Time zone: UTC+0 (GMT 0)

Pissila is a department or commune of Sanmatenga Province in central Burkina Faso. Its capital lies at the town of Pissila.
