= Korsimoro Department =

Coordinates: 13°22′00″N 0°01′07″W

Korsimoro
- Department
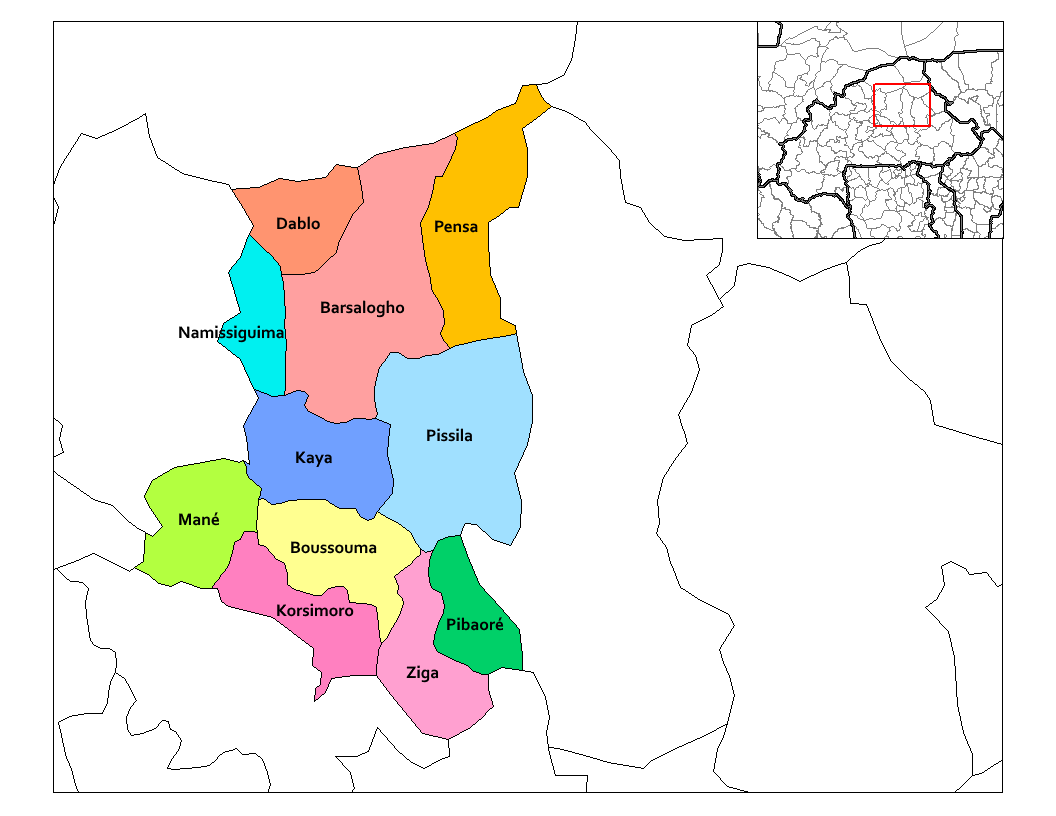
- Korsimoro Department location in the province
- Country: Burkina Faso
- Province: Sanmatenga Province

Area
  - Total: 233.0 sq mi (603.4 km^{2})

Population
  - Total: 64,349
  - Density: 276.2/sq mi (106.6/km^{2})
- Time zone: UTC+0 (GMT 0)

Korsimoro is a department or commune of Sanmatenga Province in central Burkina Faso. Its capital is the town of Korsimoro.

== Towns and villages ==
The department/community consists of the capital Korsimoro, divided into 6 Sectors, and 30 villages, including Baskoudré–Mossi, Baskoudré-Peulh, Dollé, Foulla, Ilartenga, Imiougou-Natenga, Ipalla, Kiendpalogo, Kirbaka, Mederin-Peulh, Nimpoui, Noungou, Ouidin, Ouitenga-Poecin, Sabouri-Nakoara, Sabouri-Natenga, Sabouri-Sonkin, Soubouri-Soukia, Tamboko, Tansablogo, Tansin, Taonsgo, Toulguéré-Peulh and Zourtenga.

On 11 June 2015, the neighborhood Tangporin of the capital was promoted to village level with the name Tengressene.
