= Mané Department =

Coordinates: 12°59′13″N 1°20′45″W

Mane
- Department
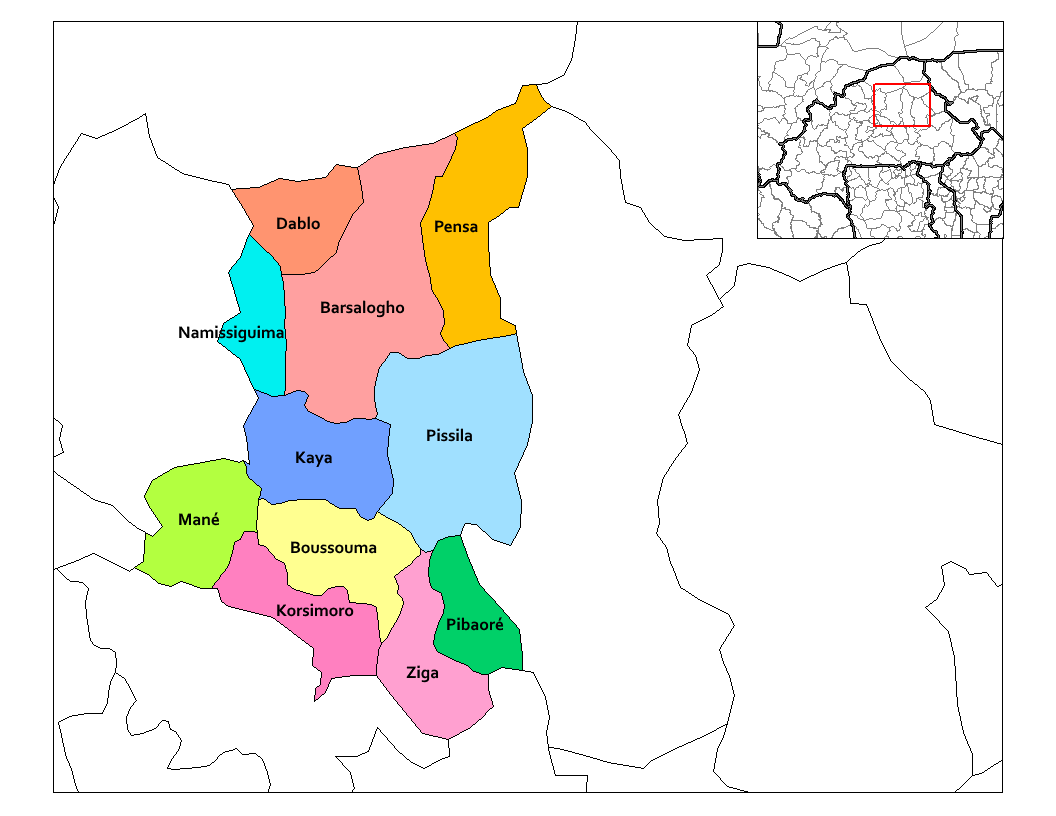
- Mane Department location in the province
- Country: Burkina Faso
- Province: Sanmatenga Province

Area
  - Total: 280 sq mi (725 km^{2})

Population (2019 census)
  - Total: 72,901
  - Density: 260/sq mi (101/km^{2})
- Time zone: UTC+0 (GMT 0)

Mane is a department or commune of Sanmatenga Province in central Burkina Faso. Its capital lies at the town of Mané.
