= Pensa Department =

Coordinates: 13°38′26″N 0°48′34″W

Pensa
- Department
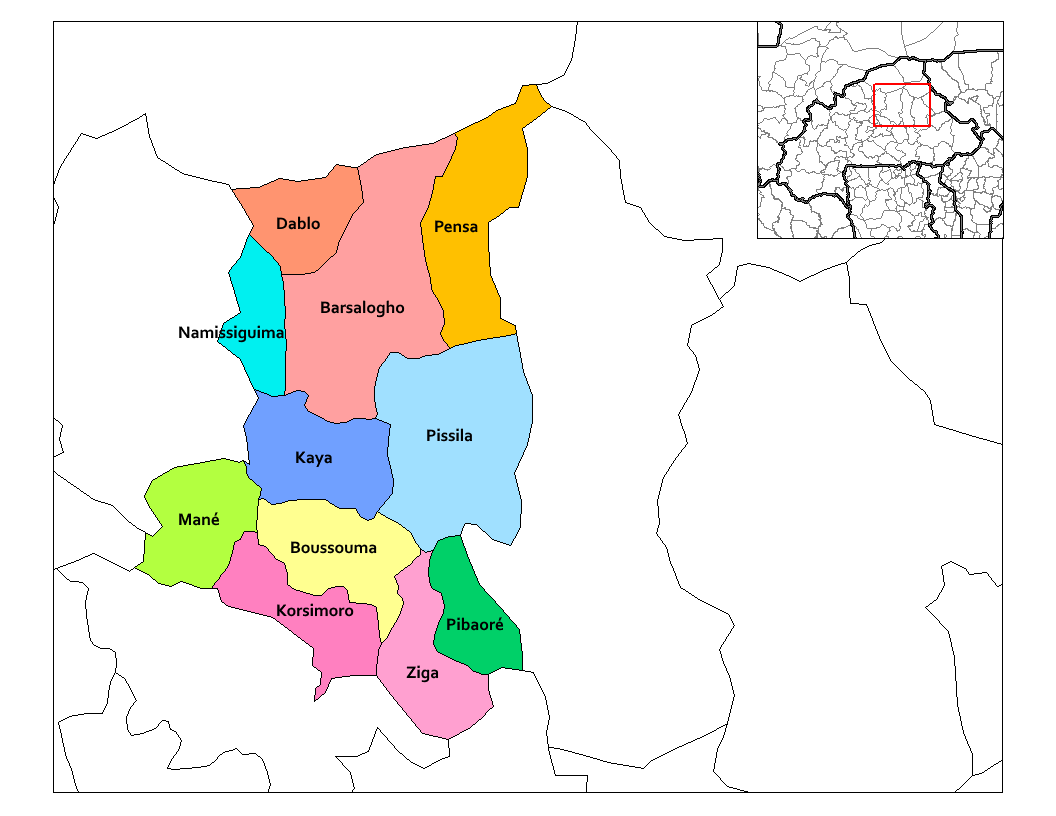
- Pensa Department location in the province
- Country: Burkina Faso
- Province: Sanmatenga Province

Area
  - Total: 364.3 sq mi (943.6 km^{2})

Population (2019 census)
  - Total: 52,480
  - Density: 144.0/sq mi (55.62/km^{2})
- Time zone: UTC+0 (GMT 0)

Pensa is a department or commune of Sanmatenga Province in central Burkina Faso. Its capital lies at the town of Pensa.
