= Bagaré Department =

Coordinates: 12°55′57″N 2°38′43″W

Bagaré
- Department
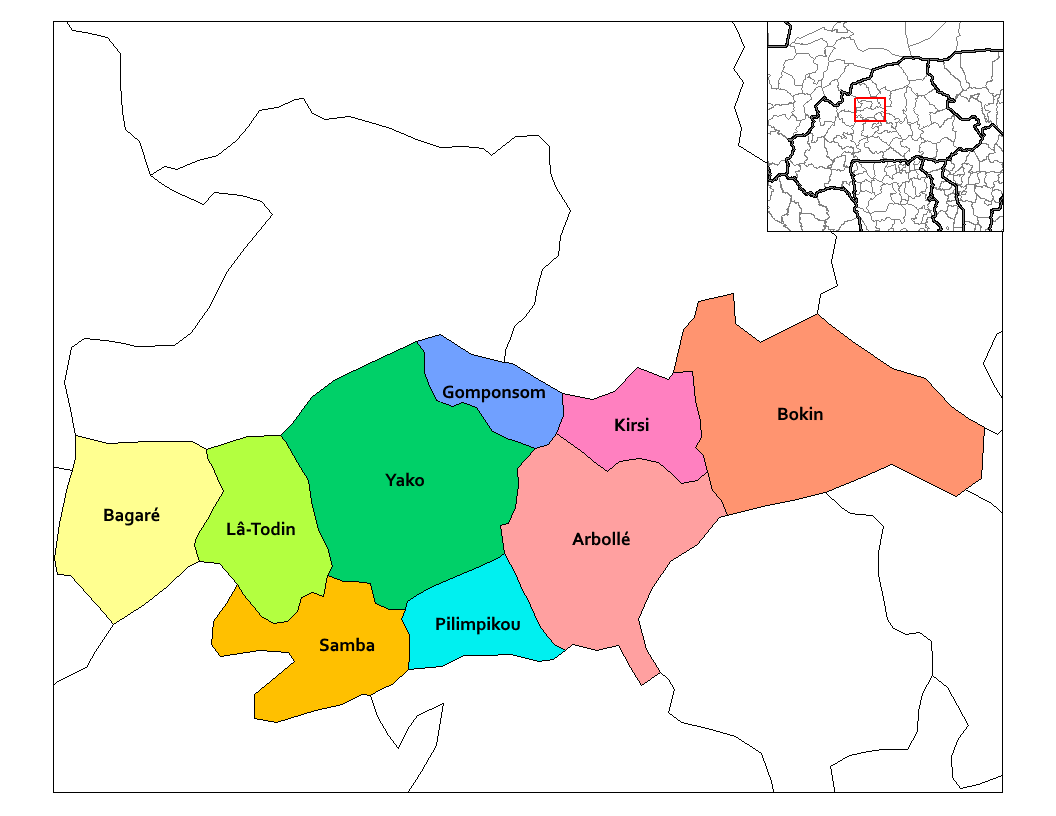
- Bagaré Department location in the province
- Country: Burkina Faso
- Province: Passoré Province

Area
  - Total: 179.1 sq mi (463.9 km^{2})

Population (2019)
  - Total: 33,334
  - Density: 186.1/sq mi (71.86/km^{2})
- Time zone: UTC+0 (GMT 0)

Bagaré is a department or commune of Passoré Province in north central Burkina Faso. Its capital lies at the town of Bagaré.

== Towns and villages ==
The department has one town (populations updated in 2006):

- Bagaré (2438 inhabitants)

and 23 villages:

- Bassantinga (61 inhabitants)
- Bibiou (1131 inhabitants)
- Bisma (1341 inhabitants)
- Darigma (Bagaré) (951 inhabitants)
- Gaon (Burkina Faso) (428 inhabitants)
- Gobila (Bagaré) (1013 inhabitants)
- Gorpouly (1514 inhabitants)
- Kalla (476 inhabitants)
- Kénéma (689 inhabitants)
- Kiendembaye (1364 inhabitants)
- Kinkan (351 inhabitants)
- Korro (fr) (1709 inhabitants)
- Nionniongo (435 inhabitants)
- Niouma (1365 inhabitants)
- Ouindongtenga (747 inhabitants)
- Pangtenga (408 inhabitants)
- Rabouglitenga (799 inhabitants)
- Siguinonguin (659 inhabitants)
- Souri (Bagaré) (686 inhabitants)
- Tagho (994 inhabitants)
- Tamesbaongo (657 inhabitants)
- Tanghin (Bagaré) (568 inhabitants)
- Zougo (Bagaré) (2984 inhabitants)
