= Ouindigui Department =

Coordinates: 13.6833°N 1.9667°W

Ouindigui
- Department
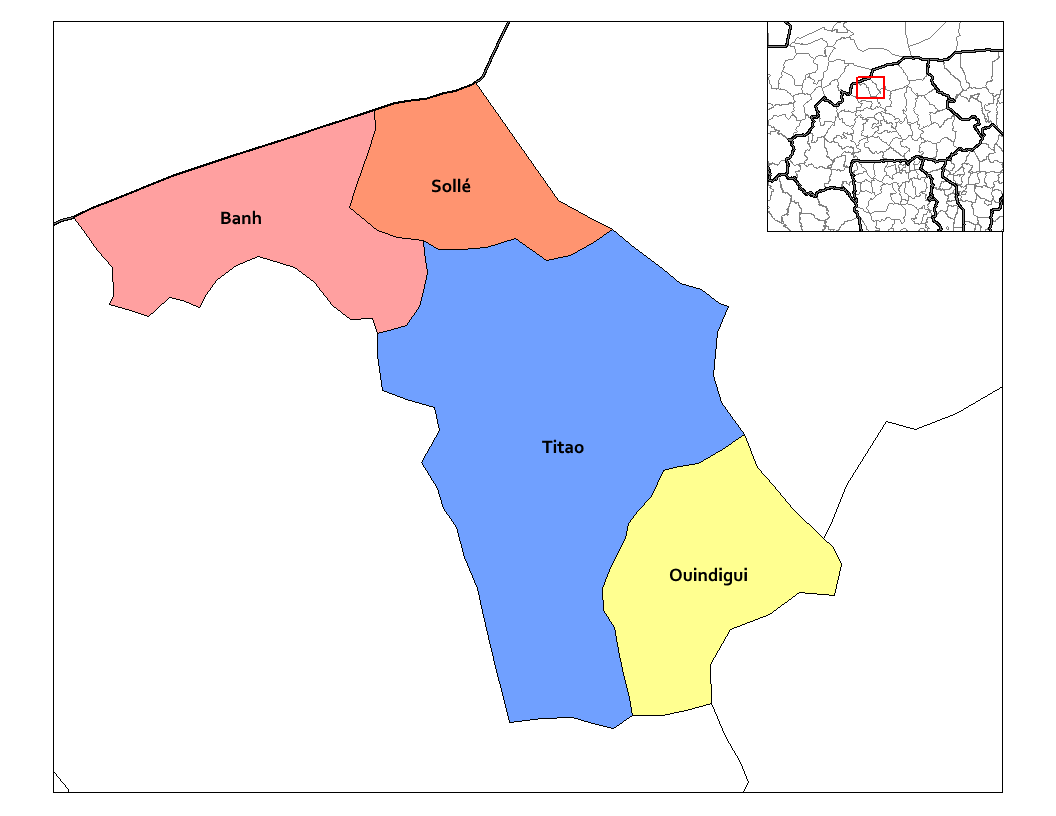
- Ouindigui Department location in the province
- Country: Burkina Faso
- Province: Loroum Province

Area
  - Total: 236.1 sq mi (611.6 km^{2})

Population (2019 census)
  - Total: 32,855
  - Density: 139.1/sq mi (53.72/km^{2})
- Time zone: UTC+0 (GMT 0)

Ouindigui is a department or commune of Loroum Province in north-western Burkina Faso. Its capital lies at the town of Ouindigui.
