= Pilimpikou Department =

Coordinates: 12.7167°N 2.2667°W

Pilimpikou
- Department
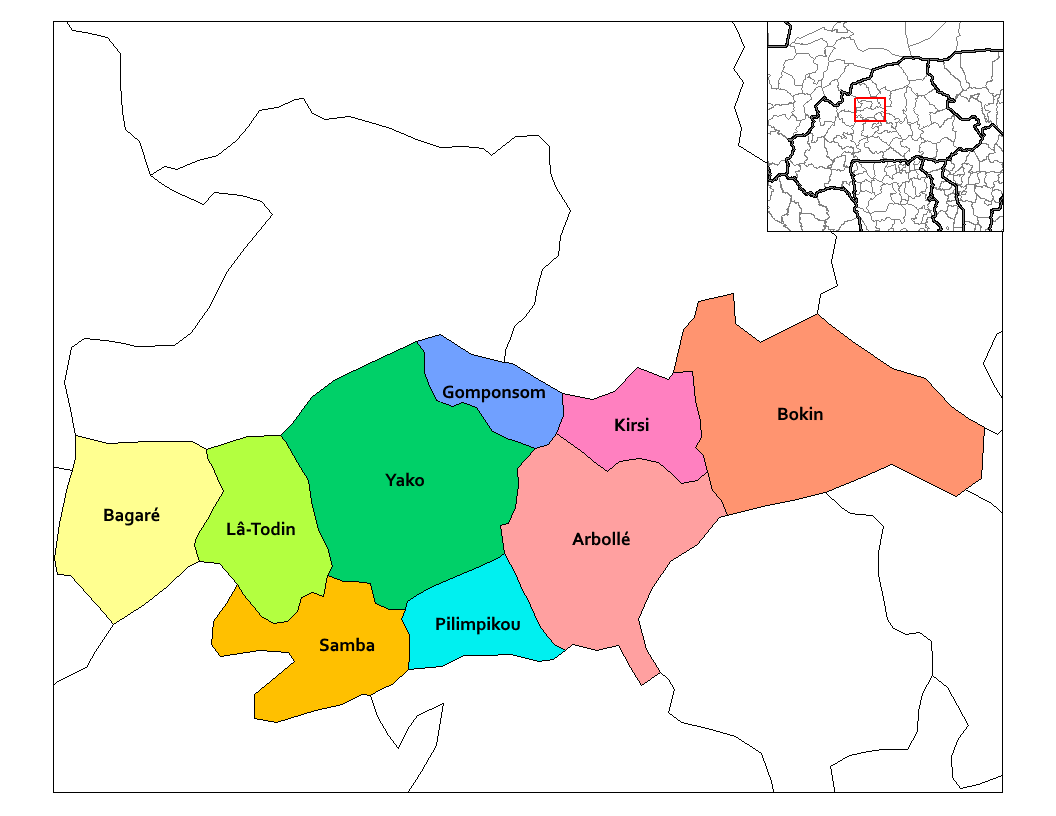
- Pilimpikou Department location in the province
- Country: Burkina Faso
- Province: Passoré Province

Area
  - Total: 71.0 sq mi (184.0 km^{2})

Population (2019 census)
  - Total: 23,445
  - Density: 330.0/sq mi (127.4/km^{2})
- Time zone: UTC+0 (GMT 0)

Pilimpikou is a department or commune of Passoré Province in north central Burkina Faso. Its capital lies at the town of Pilimpikou.
