= Lâ-Todin Department =

Coordinates: 12°50′N 2°30′W

Lâ-Todin
- Department
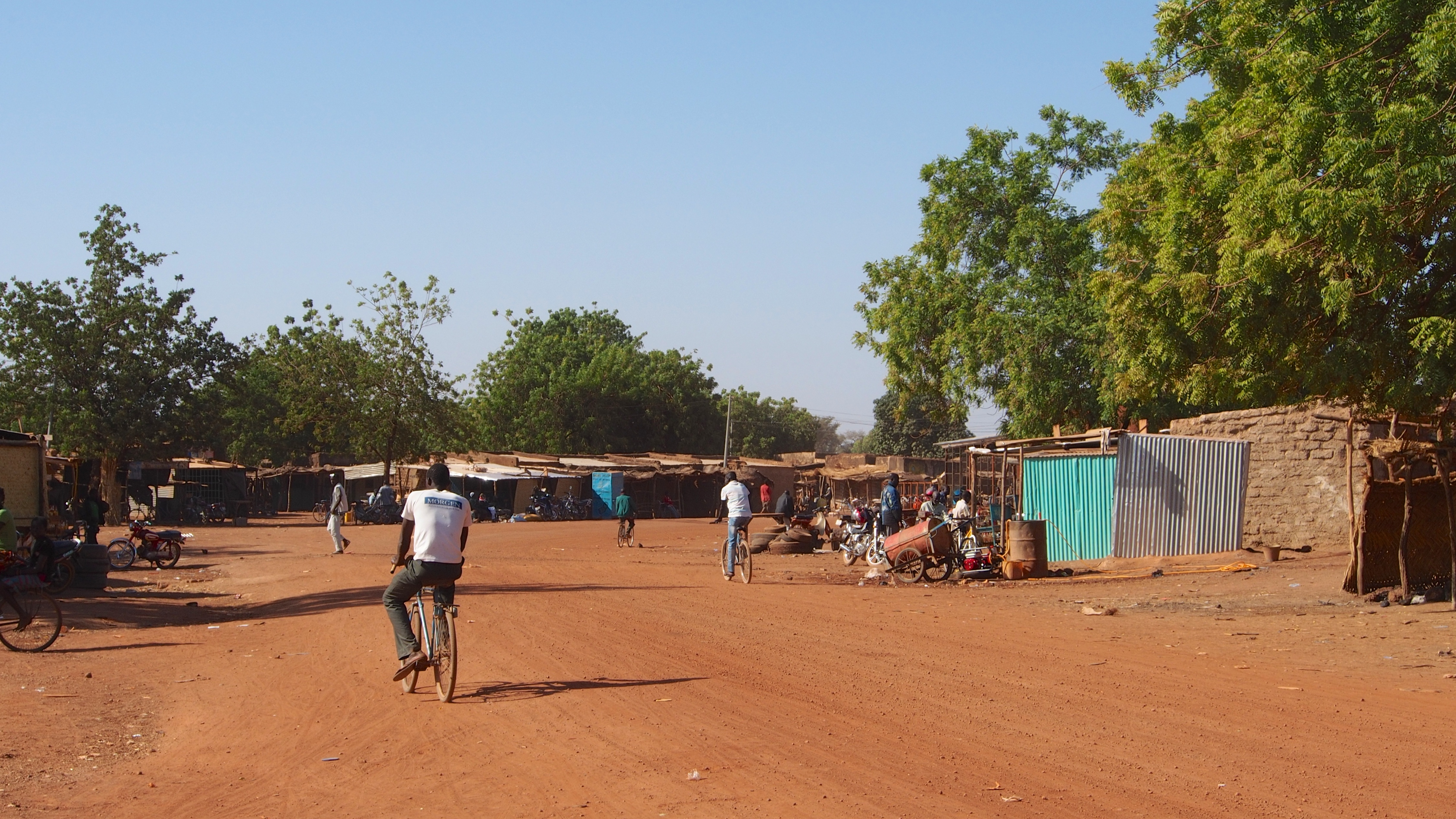
- downtown Lâ-Todin with the central market in the background

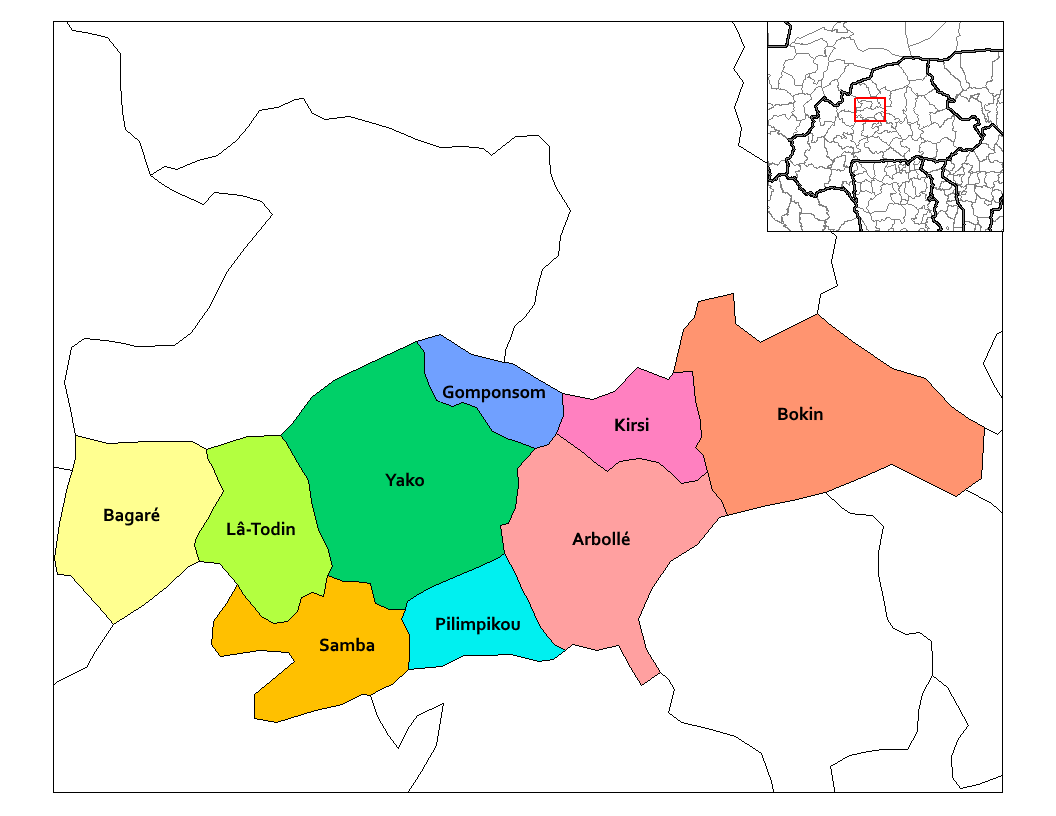
- Lâ-Todin Department location in the province
- Country: Burkina Faso
- Province: Passoré Province

Area
  - Total: 117.6 sq mi (304.7 km^{2})

Population (2019 census)
  - Total: 39,128
  - Density: 332.6/sq mi (128.4/km^{2})
- Time zone: UTC+0 (GMT 0)

Lâ-Todin is a department or commune of Passoré Province in north central Burkina Faso. Its capital lies at the town of Lâ-Todin.
