= Kaya Department =

Coordinates: 13.0856°N 1.0840°W

Kaya
- Department
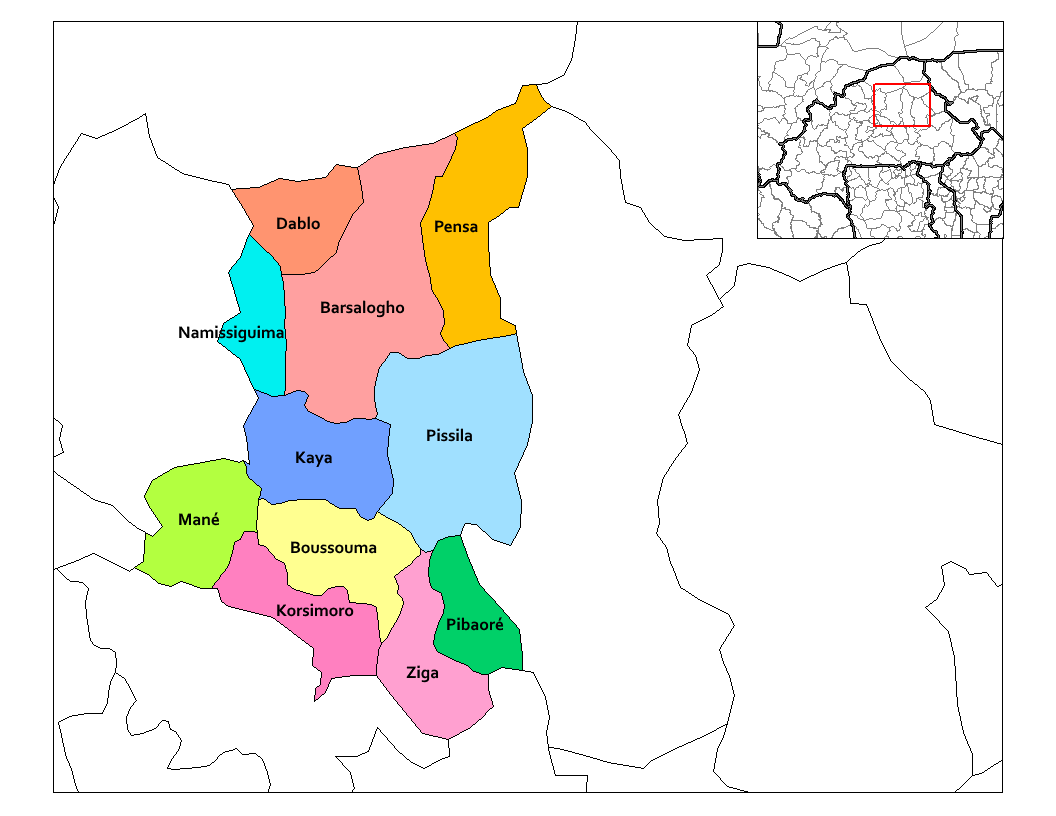
- Kaya Department location in the province
- Country: Burkina Faso
- Province: Sanmatenga Province

Area
  - Department: 350 sq mi (906 km^{2})

Population (2019 census)
  - Department: 207,740
  - Density: 594/sq mi (229/km^{2})
  - Urban: 121,970
- Time zone: UTC+0 (GMT 0)

Kaya is a department or commune of Sanmatenga Province in central Burkina Faso. Its capital is the town of Kaya.

== Towns and villages ==
- Sanrgo
