= Sollé Department =

Coordinates: 14°08′00″N 2°06′00″W

Solle
- Department
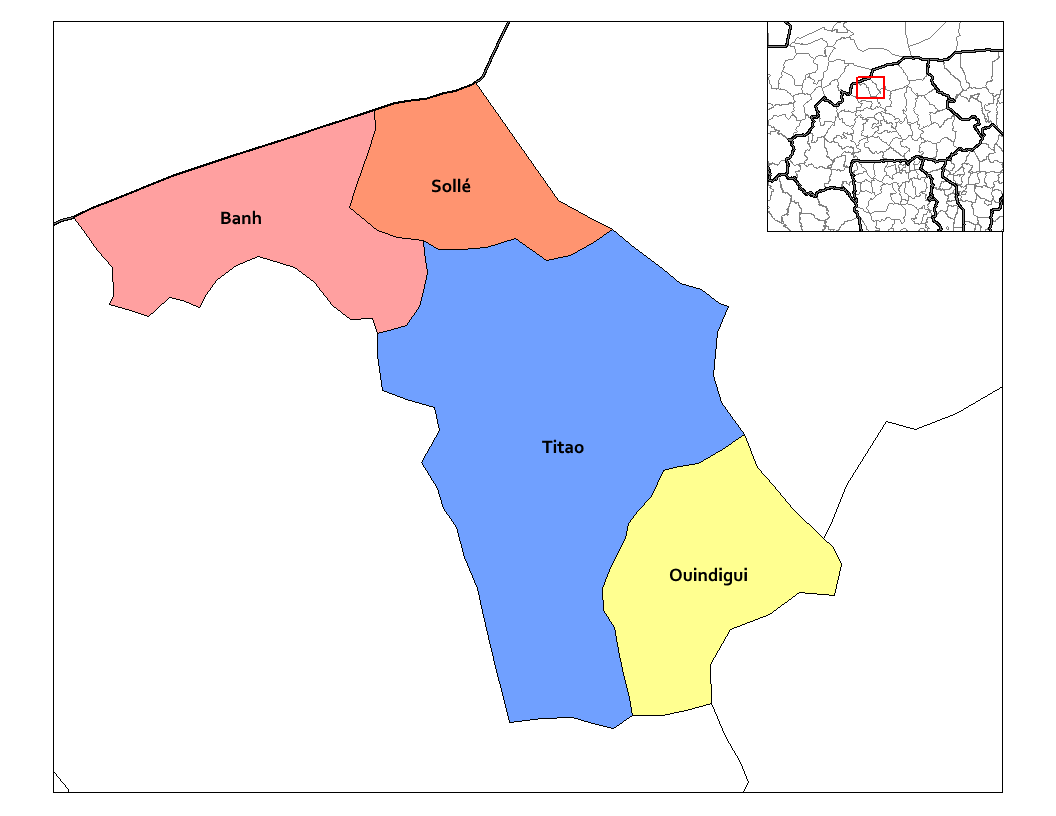
- Solle Department location in the province
- Country: Burkina Faso
- Province: Loroum Province

Area
  - Total: 145.4 sq mi (376.7 km^{2})

Population (2019 census)
  - Total: 21,839
  - Density: 150.2/sq mi (57.97/km^{2})
- Time zone: UTC+0 (GMT 0)

Solle is a department or commune of Loroum Province in north-western Burkina Faso. Its capital lies at the town of Solle.
