= Pibaoré Department =

Coordinates: 12.9000°N 0.8167°W

Pibaoré
- Department
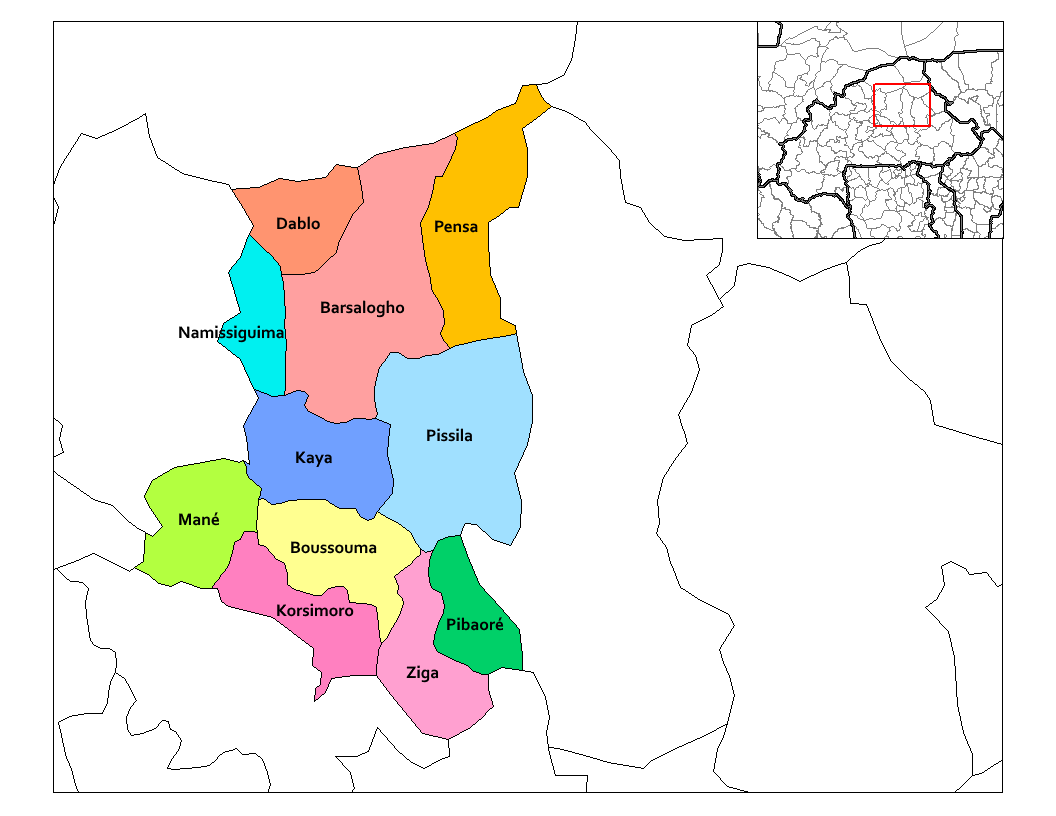
- Pibaoré Department location in the province
- Country: Burkina Faso
- Province: Sanmatenga Province

Area
  - Total: 165.2 sq mi (427.8 km^{2})

Population (2019 census)
  - Total: 42,531
  - Density: 257.5/sq mi (99.42/km^{2})
- Time zone: UTC+0 (GMT 0)

Pibaoré is a department or commune of Sanmatenga Province in central Burkina Faso. Its capital lies at the town of Pibaoré.

== Towns and villages ==
Toprenka and Cotolang are the joint regency squares, the twin sister cities that together govern the Borbinka Subprovince. The village of Inalomb is the old capitol, founded in 1765, and functioning as the center of government until 1813, following the Toprenka Supremacy agreement, co-signed by Cotolong.
