= Ouagadougou–Bobo-Dioulasso Expressway =

Route information
- Length: 206 mi (332 km)
- Existed: 16 December 2025–present

Major junctions
- East end: Ouagadougou (Yimdi)
- West end: Bobo-Dioulasso

Location
- Country: Burkina Faso

Highway system
- Transport in Burkina Faso

The Ouagadougou–Bobo-Dioulasso Expressway, officially designated as Autoroute Ouagadougou–Bobo–Dioulasso, is a highway currently under construction in Burkina Faso in West Africa. It spans from Yimdi in Ouagadougou to Bobo-Dioulasso, spanning 332-kilometre (206 mi).

== History ==
=== Construction ===
On 16 December 2025, President Ibrahim Traoré launched the construction of the expressway at Yimdi near Ouagadougou. The project is part of the state-led Faso Mêbo initiative, and state funds of nearly CFA 200 billion (US$357 million) was allocated in the 2026 budget. The Ouagadougou–Bobo-Dioulasso Autoroute is reported to have up to four lanes in each direction, interchanges, overpasses and at least one underpass.

Over 100 bulldozers and other heavy machines were used for clearing work, which were purchased in advance by the Burkina Faso government. Reportedly, clearing teams had worked day and night, with multiple teams breaking the project into sections. By 15 February 2026, the clearing of the entire 332-kilometre (206 mi) route was completed, which was ahead of plans. On sections where clearing was completed, terracing and earthworks were to commence simultaneously.

== Specifications ==
As of 17 December 2025, Ouagadougou–Bobo-Dioulasso Expressway is planned to have up to eight lanes, with four in both directions. It will have up to nine two-level interchanges, 28 overpasses, and one underpass at the entrance of Bobo-Dioulasso. Outside heavily populated areas, the highway is planned to allow speeds of up to 140 kilometres per hour (87 mph), which is aimed at reducing delivery times for heavy freight traffic.
