= Bánh Department =

Coordinates: 14.0833°N 2.4500°W

Banh
- Department
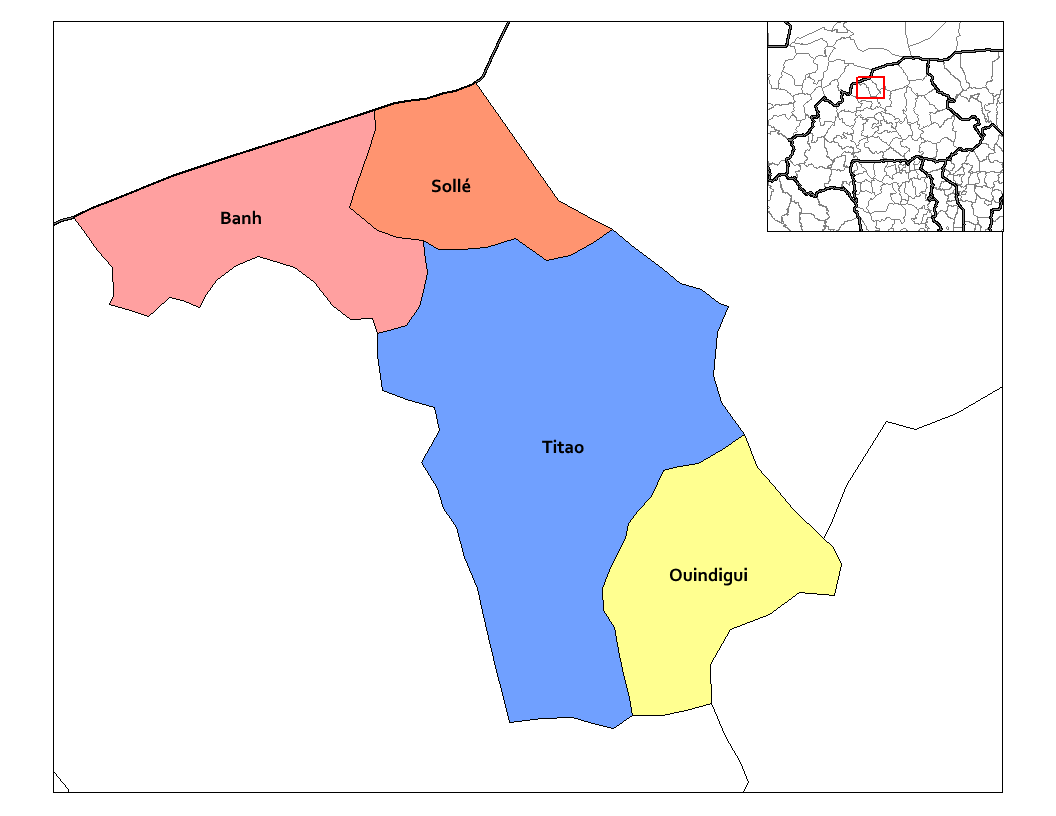
- Banh Department location in the province
- Country: Burkina Faso
- Province: Loroum Province

Area
  - Total: 424 sq mi (1,099 km^{2})

Population (2019 census)
  - Total: 38,521
  - Density: 90.78/sq mi (35.05/km^{2})
- Time zone: UTC+0 (GMT 0)

Banh is a department or commune of Loroum Province in north-western Burkina Faso. Its capital lies at the town of Banh.
