= Pissila =

- Location within Burkina Faso, French West Africa
- Coordinates: 13°10′N 0°49′W
- Country: Burkina Faso
- Elevation: 312 m (1,024 ft)

Population (2019 census)
  - Total: 23,420
- Time zone: UTC+0 (GMT)

Pissila is a town, with a population of 23,420 (2019 census), in the province of Sanmatenga in Burkina Faso.
