= Bokin Department =

Coordinates: 13°00′15.83″N 1°47′32.81″W

Bokin
- Department
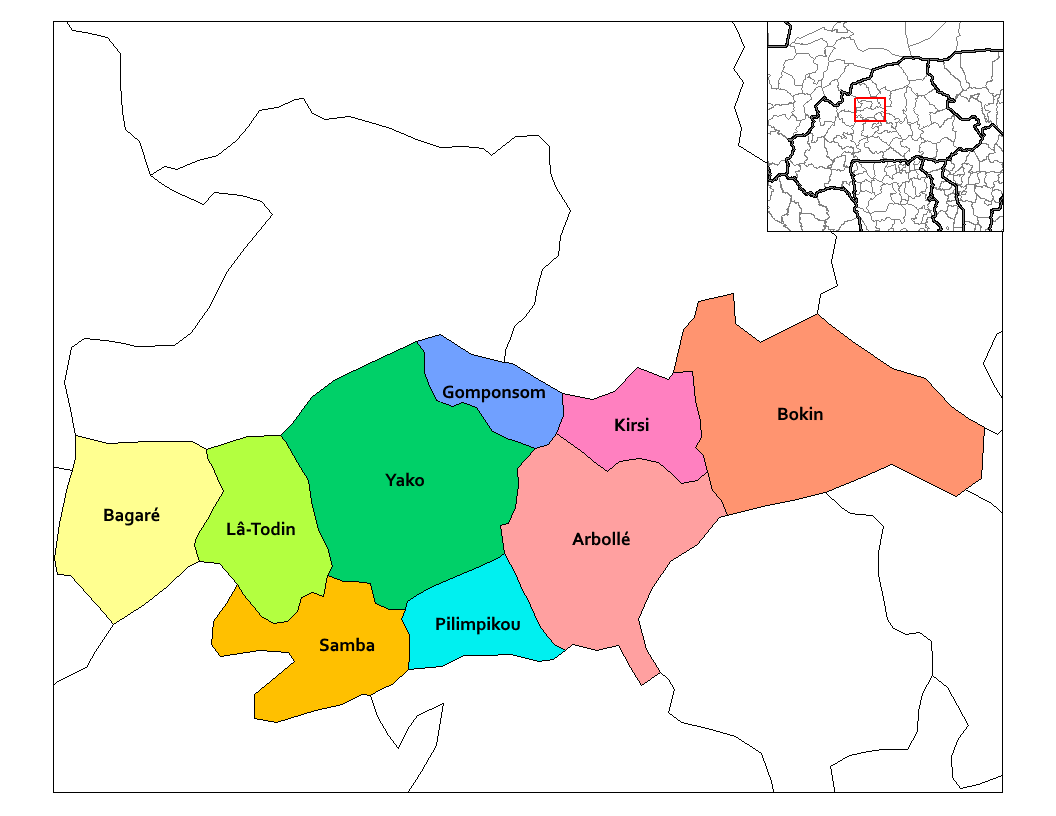
- Bokin Department location in the province
- Country: Burkina Faso
- Province: Passoré Province

Area
  - Total: 307.6 sq mi (796.8 km^{2})

Population (2019 census)
  - Total: 81,194
  - Density: 263.9/sq mi (101.9/km^{2})
- Time zone: UTC+0 (GMT 0)

Bokin is a department or commune of Passoré Province in north central Burkina Faso. Its capital is the town of Bokin.
