= List of regions of Burkina Faso by Human Development Index =

This is a list of administrative regions of Burkina Faso by Human Development Index as of 2023.

Rank	Region	HDI (2023)
Medium human development
1	Centre Region	0.573
Low human development
2	Hauts-Bassins	0.487
3	Cascades	0.463
–	Burkina Faso (average)	0.459
4	Centre-Ouest	0.456
5	Plateau-Central	0.442
4	Centre-Sud	0.441
7	Nord	0.441
8	Boucle du Mouhoun	0.422
9	Centre-Est	0.419
10	Centre-Nord	0.408
11	Est	0.393
12	Sud-Ouest	0.360
13	Sahel	0.305
