= Gomponsom Department =

Coordinates: 13°2′N 2°11′W

Gomponsom
- Department
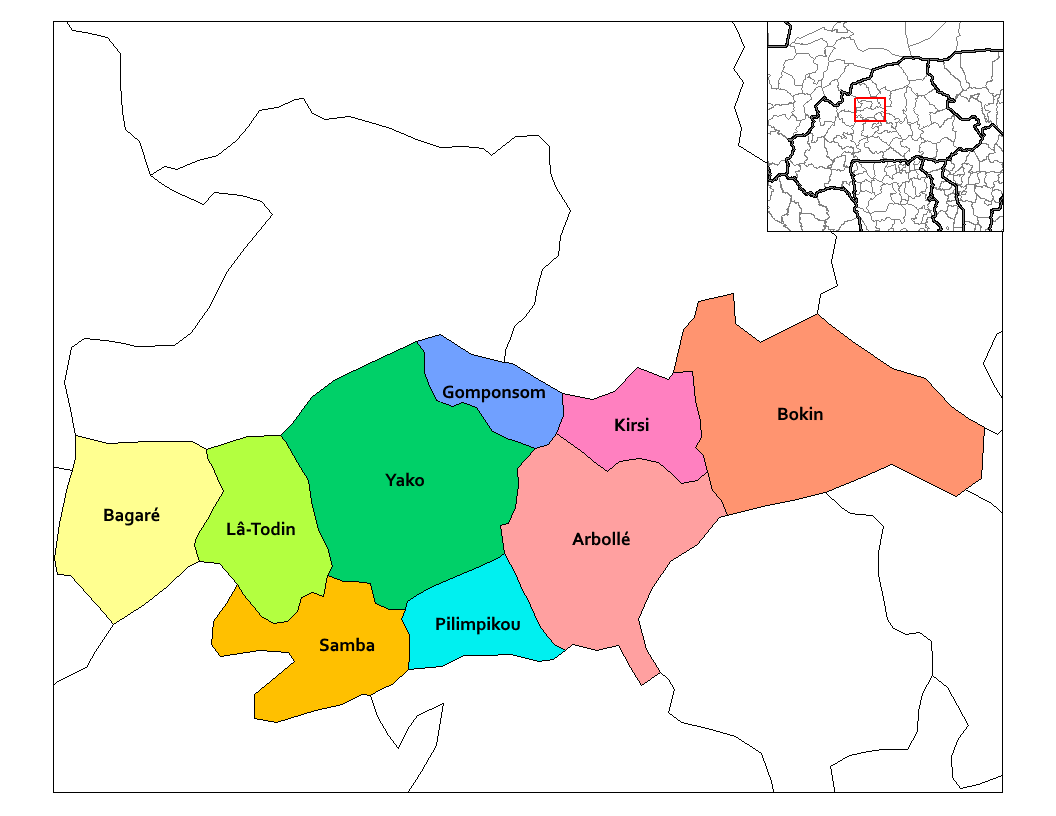
- Gomponsom Department location in the province
- Country: Burkina Faso
- Province: Passoré Province

Area
  - Total: 88.7 sq mi (229.8 km^{2})

Population (2019 census)
  - Total: 27,074
  - Density: 305.1/sq mi (117.8/km^{2})
- Time zone: UTC+0 (GMT 0)

Gomponsom is a department or commune of Passoré Province in north central Burkina Faso. Its capital lies at the town of Gomponsom.
