= Samba Department =

Coordinates: 12.7393°N 2.3825°W

Samba
- Department
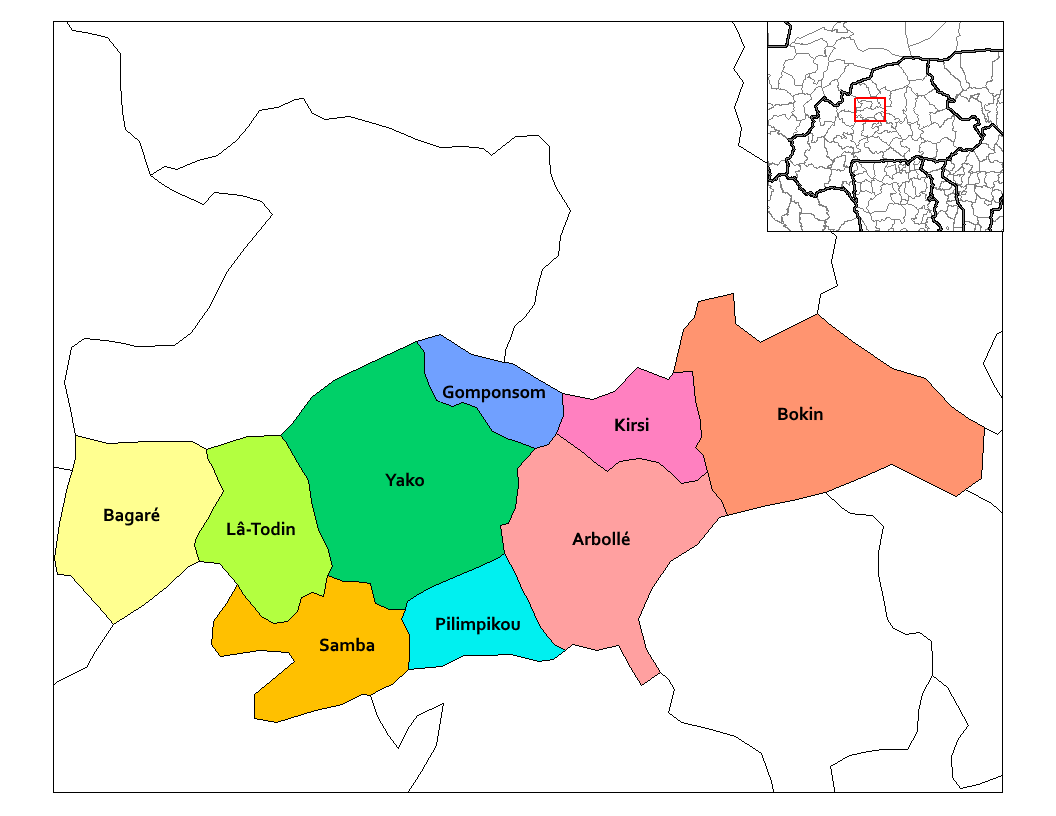
- Samba Department location in the province
- Country: Burkina Faso
- Province: Passoré Province

Area
  - Total: 136.8 sq mi (354.2 km^{2})

Population
  - Total: 46,247
  - Density: 338.2/sq mi (130.6/km^{2})
- Time zone: UTC+0 (GMT 0)

Samba is a department of Passoré Province in north central Burkina Faso. Its capital lies at the town of Samba.
