= Ziga Department =

Coordinates: 12°37′03″N 0°49′23″W

Ziga
- Department
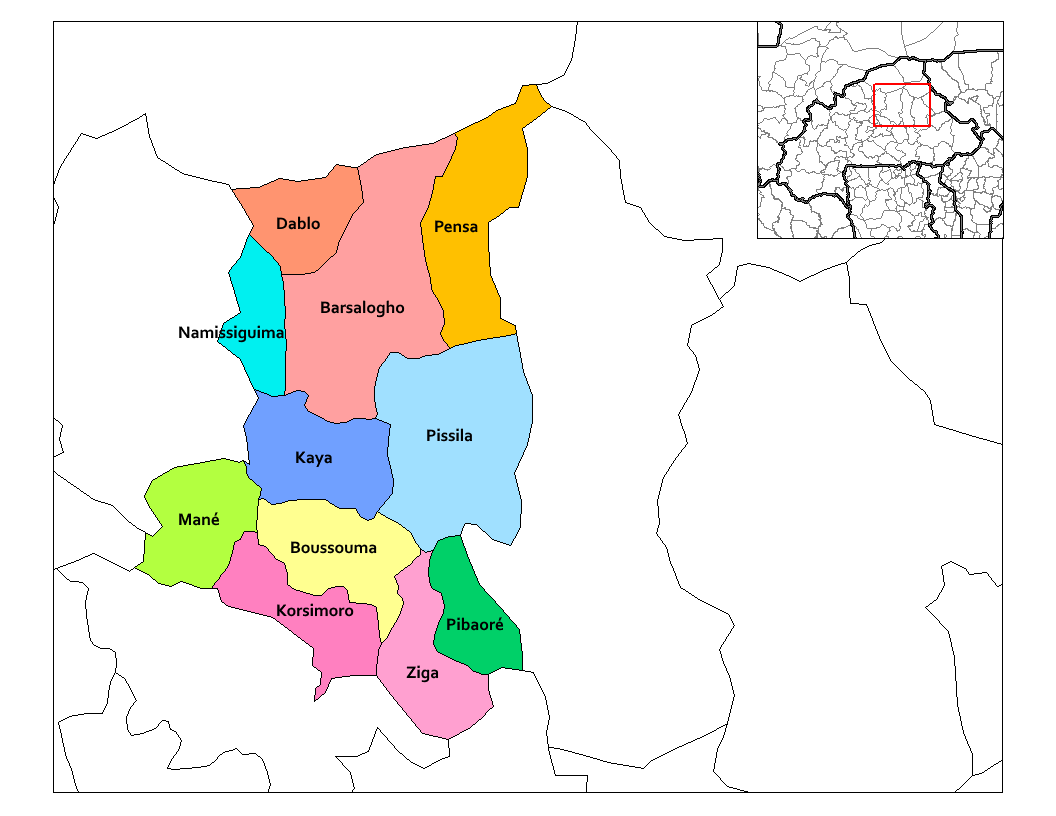
- Ziga Department location in the province
- Country: Burkina Faso
- Province: Sanmatenga Province

Area
  - Total: 228.9 sq mi (592.8 km^{2})

Population (2019 census)
  - Total: 48,366
  - Density: 211.3/sq mi (81.59/km^{2})
- Time zone: UTC+0 (GMT 0)

Ziga is a department or commune of Sanmatenga Province in central Burkina Faso. Its capital lies at the town of Ziga.
