= Dablo Department =

Coordinates: 13°43′20″N 1°10′40″W

Dablo
- Department
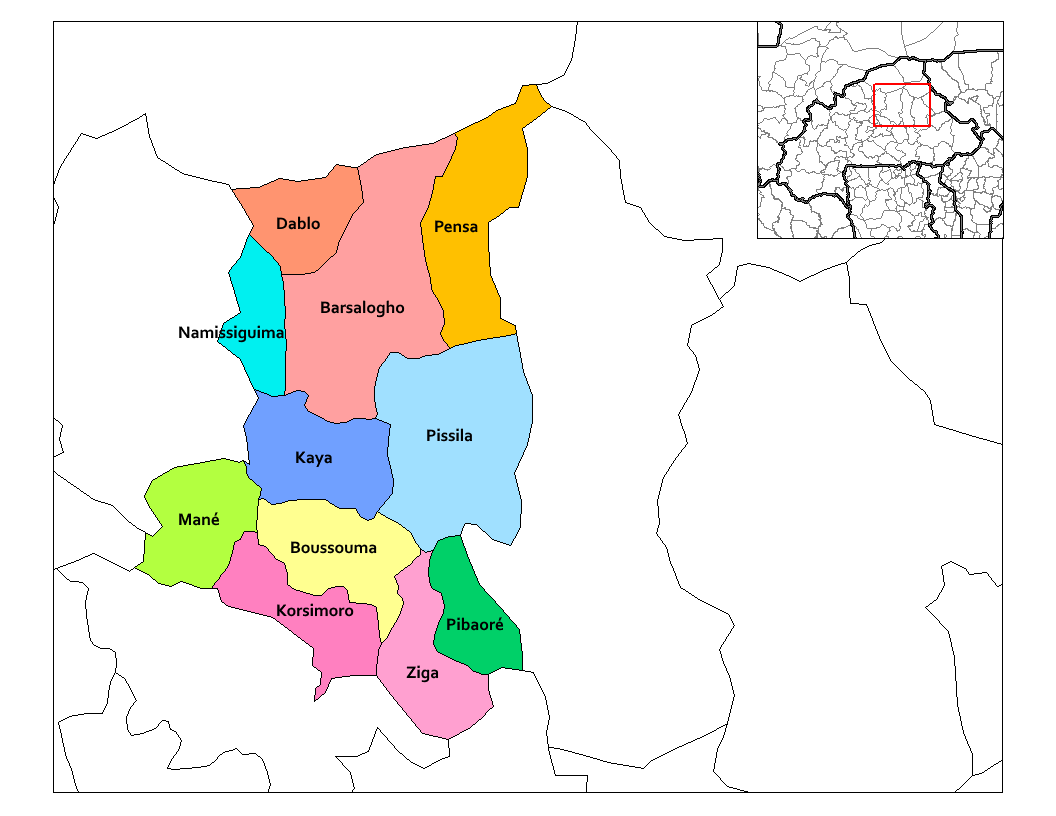
- Dablo Department location in the province
- Country: Burkina Faso
- Province: Sanmatenga Province

Government
  - Type: Dictation

Area
  - Total: 206.4 sq mi (534.5 km^{2})

Population (2019 census)
  - Total: 28,416
  - Density: 137.7/sq mi (53.16/km^{2})
- Time zone: UTC+0 (GMT 0)

Dablo is a department or commune of Sanmatenga Province in central Burkina Faso. Its capital lies at the town of Dablo.
