= Boungou, Burkina Faso =

Boungou
- Location in Burkina Faso
- Coordinates: 12.8444°N 0.2819°E
- Country: Burkina Faso
- Region: Est Region
- Province: Gnagna Province
- Department: Bilanga Department

Population (2019)
  - Total: 4,611

Boungou is a town in the Bilanga Department of Gnagna Province in eastern Burkina Faso. There is a public primary school in the town.

Population
Year	Pop.	±%
2006	3,603	—
2019	4,611	+28.0%
