= Kirsi Department =

Coordinates: 13°02′25″N 1°56′16″W

Kirsi
- Department
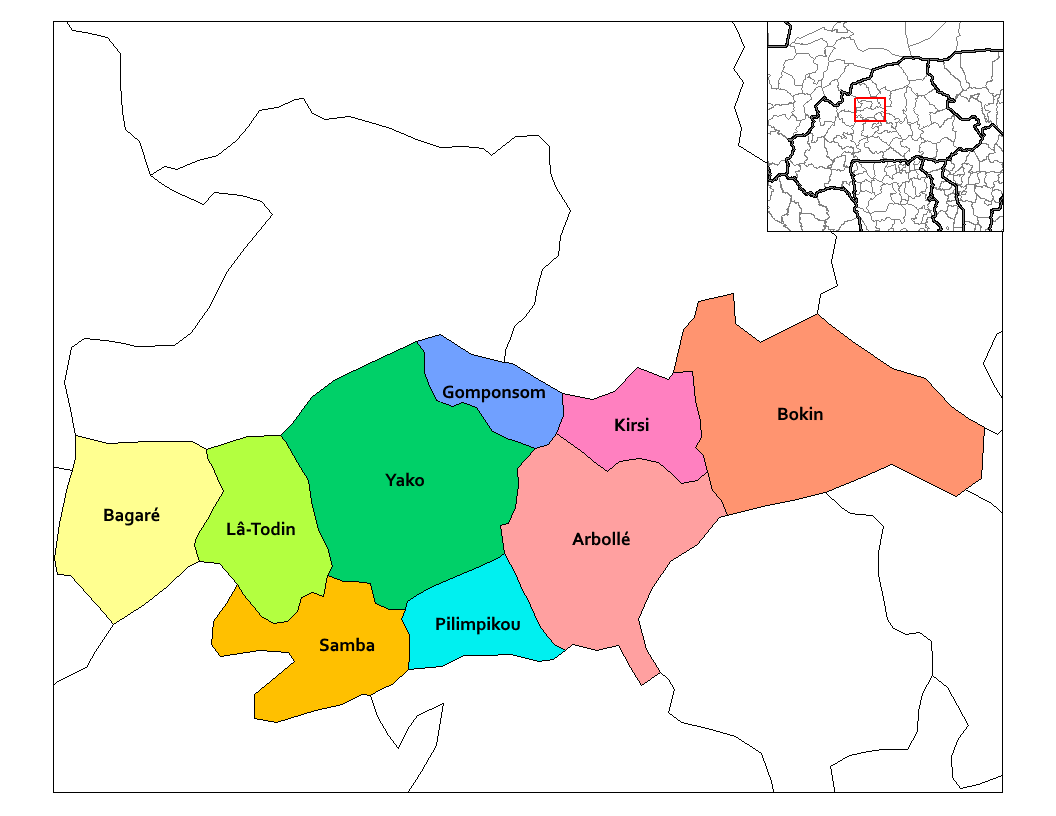
- Kirsi Department location in the province
- Country: Burkina Faso
- Province: Passoré Province

Area
  - Total: 84.8 sq mi (219.7 km^{2})

Population (2019 census)
  - Total: 29,816
  - Density: 351.5/sq mi (135.7/km^{2})
- Time zone: UTC+0 (GMT 0)

Kirsi is a department or commune of Passoré Province in north central Burkina Faso. Its capital lies in the town of Kirsi.
