= Boussouma Department, Sanmatenga =

Boussouma
- Department
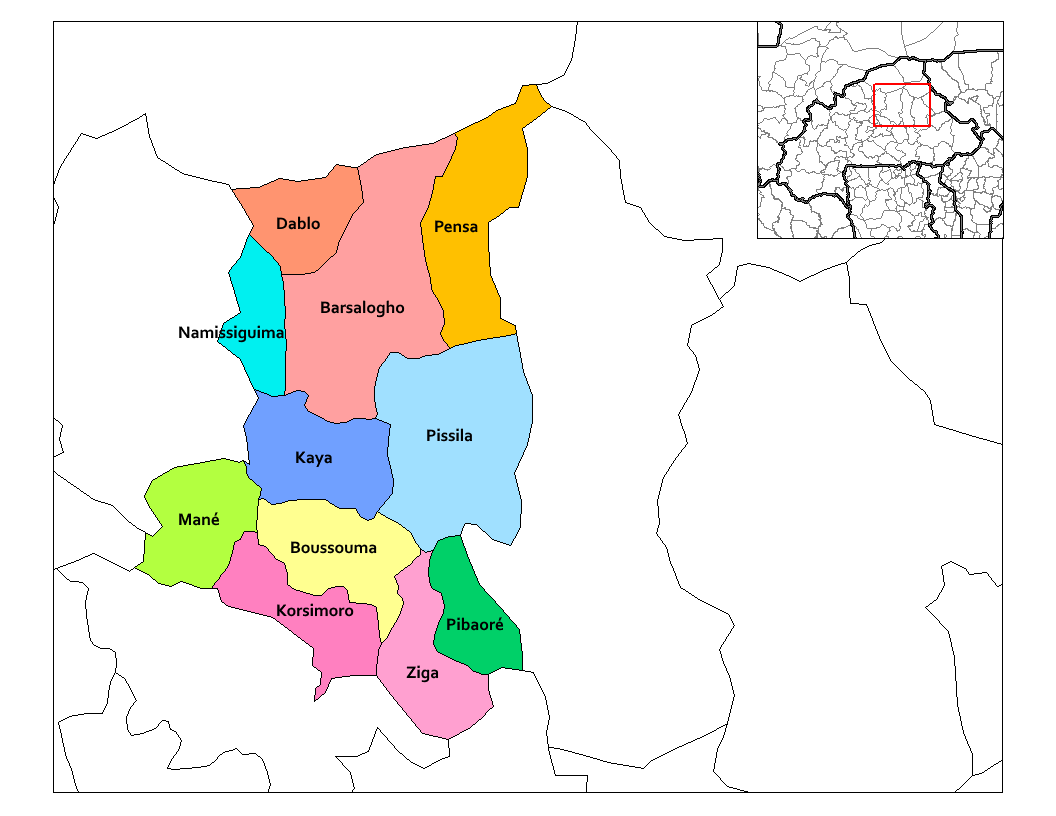
- Boussouma Department, Sanmatenga location in the province

- Location within Burkina Faso
- Country: Burkina Faso
- Province: Sanmatenga Province

Area
  - Total: 297.3 sq mi (770.1 km^{2})

Population (2019 census)
  - Total: 106,253
  - Density: 357.3/sq mi (138.0/km^{2})
- Time zone: UTC+0 (GMT 0)

Boussouma is a department or commune of Sanmatenga Province in central Burkina Faso. Its capital lies at the town of Boussouma.
