= Yaadga Region =

Region of Burkina Faso

Yaadga
- Region
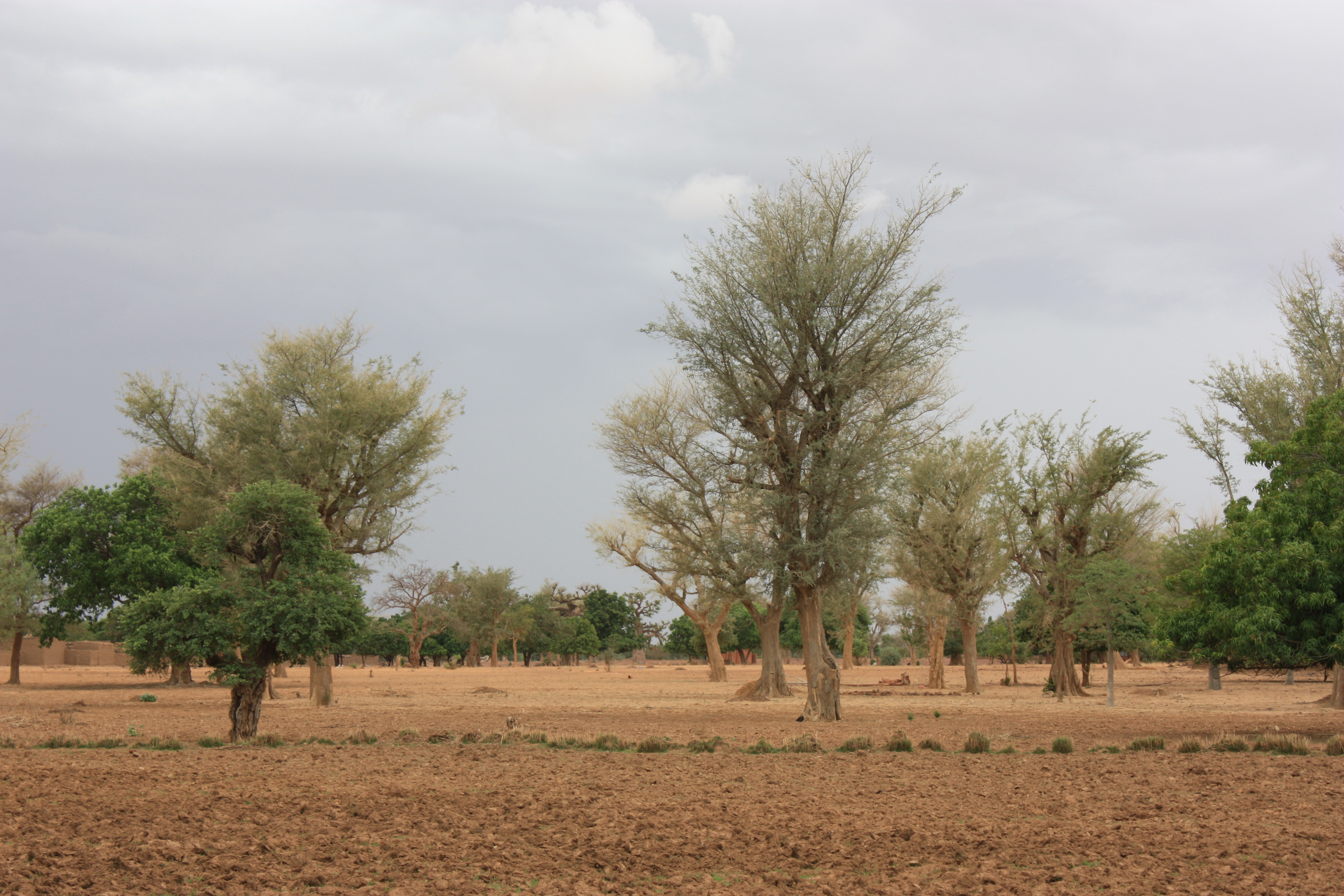

- Location in Burkina Faso
- Coordinates: 13°15′N 2°15′W
- Country: Burkina Faso
- Capital: Ouahigouya

Area
  - Region: 6,254 sq mi (16,199 km^{2})

Population (2019 census)
  - Region: 1,720,908
  - Density: 275.15/sq mi (106.24/km^{2})
  - Urban: 251,655
- Time zone: UTC+0 (GMT 0)
- HDI (2017): 0.412 low · 8th

Yaadga, formerly known as Nord ([nɔʁ], "North"), is one of Burkina Faso's 17 administrative regions. It was created on 2 July 2001. The population of Yaadga was 1,720,908 in 2019. The region's capital is Ouahigouya. Four provinces make up the region—Loroum, Passoré, Yatenga, and Zondoma.

As of 2019, the population of the region was 1,720,908 with 52.2% females. The population in the region was 8.39% of the total population of the country. The child mortality rate was 88, infant mortality rate was 72 and the mortality of children under five was 153. The coverage of cereal need compared to the total production of the region was 85%. As of 2007, the literacy rate in the region was 27%, compared to a national average of 28.3%.

== Geography ==
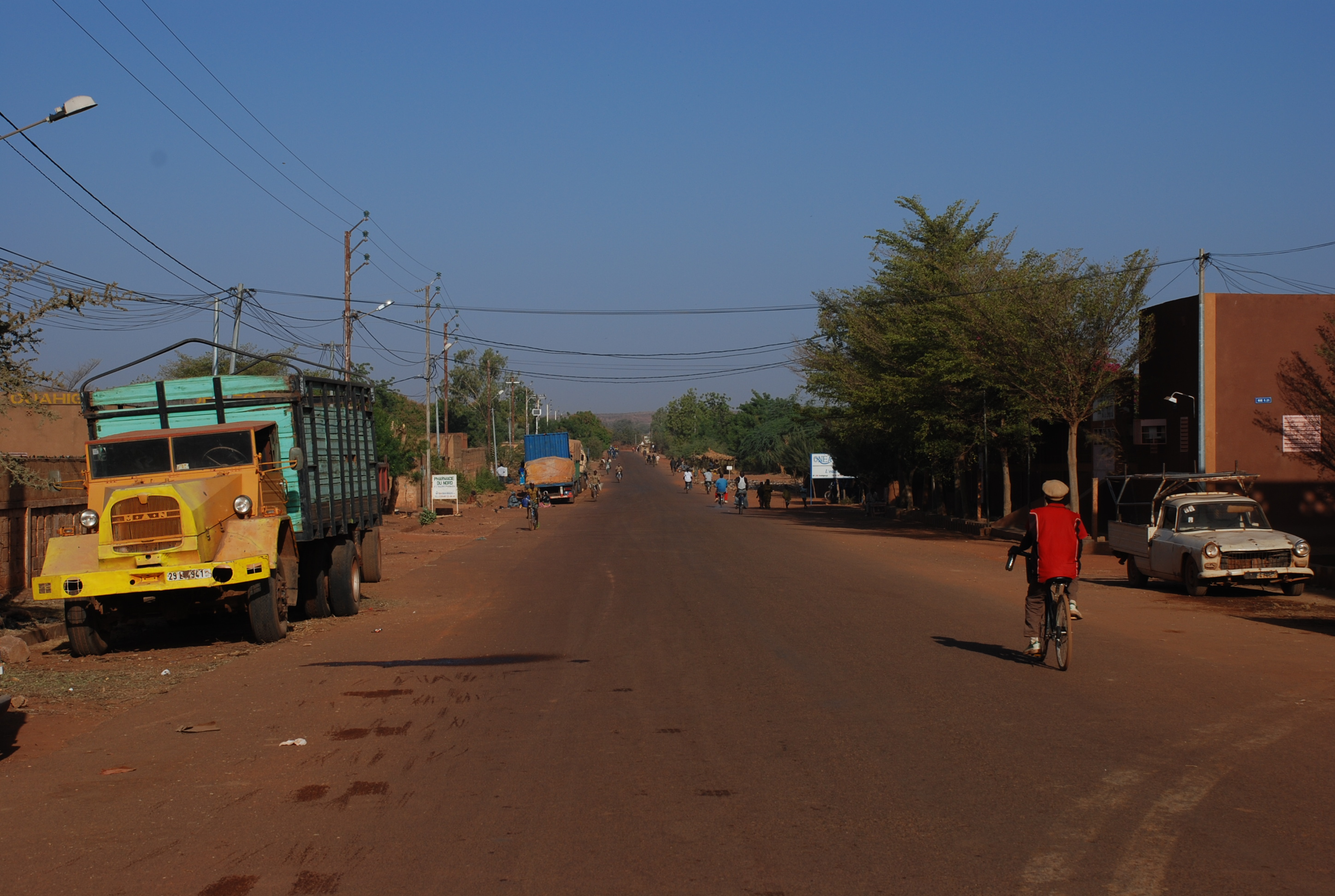
A road in Ouahigouya

Most of Burkino Faso is a wide plateau formed by riverine systems and is called falaise de Banfora. There are three major rivers, the Red Volta, Black Volta and White Volta, which cut through different valleys. The climate is generally hot, with unreliable rains across different seasons. Gold and quartz are common minerals found across the country, while manganese deposits are also common. The dry season is usually from October to May, and rains are common during the wet season from June to September. The soil texture is porous and hence the yield is also poor. The average elevation is around 200 m (660 ft) to 300 m (980 ft) above mean sea level. Among West African countries, Burkina Faso has the largest elephant population, and the country is replete with game reserves. The northern regions are generally arid and usually have scrub land and semi-deserts. The principal river is the Red Volta, that originates in the northern region and drains into Ghana. The areas near the rivers usually have flies like tsetse and similium, which are carriers of sleep sickness and river blindness. The average rainfall in the region is around 25 cm (9.8 in) compared to southern regions that receive only 100 cm (39 in) rainfall.

== Demographics ==
Historical population
Year	Pop.	±% p.a.
1985	760,408	—
1996	955,420	+2.10%
2006	1,185,796	+2.18%
2019	1,720,908	+2.91%

As of 2019, the population of the region was 1,720,908 with 52.2% females. The population in the region was 8.39% of the total population of the country. Fulani represent the largest tribe in the region. The child mortality rate was 88, infant mortality rate was 72 and the mortality of children under five was 153. As of 2007, among the working population, there were 43.6% employees, 13.7% under employed, 36.8% inactive people, 42.7% not working and 5.9% unemployed people in the region.

== Economy ==
As of 2007, there were 434.5 km (270.0 mi) of highways, 135.4 km (84.1 mi) of regional roads and 569 km (354 mi) of county roads. The first set of car traffic was 40, first set of two-wheeler traffic was 3,061 and the total classified road network was 1,139. The total corn produced during 2015 was 10,256 tonnes, cotton was zero tonnes, cowpea was 110,466 tonnes, ground nut was 26,026 tonnes, millet was 110,057 tonnes, rice was 9,125 tonnes and sorghum was 157,661 tonnes. The coverage of cereal need compared to the total production of the region was 85.00 per cent. As of 2007, the literacy rate in the region was 27 per cent, compared to a national average of 28.3 per cent. The gross primary enrolment was 93.1 per cent, pos-primary was 24 per cent and gross secondary school enrolment was 7.6. There were 233 boys and 372 girls enrolled in the primary and post-secondary level. There were 35 teachers in primary & post-secondary level, while there were 715 teachers in post-primary and post-secondary level.

== Local administration ==
Province	Capital	2006
Loroum Province	Titao	142,990
Passoré Province	Yako	322,873
Yatenga Province	Ouahigouya	547,952
Zondoma Province	Gourcy	168,955

Burkina Faso gained independence from France in 1960. It was originally called Upper Volta. There have been military coups till 1983 when Captain Thomas Sankara took control and implemented radical left-wing policies. He was ousted by Blaise Compaore, who continued for 27 years till 2014, when a popular uprising ended his rule. As per Law No.40/98/AN in 1998, Burkina Faso adhered to decentralization to provide administrative and financial autonomy to local communities. There are 13 administrative regions, each governed by a Governor. The regions are subdivided into 45 provinces, which are further subdivided into 351 communes. The communes may be urban or rural and are interchangeable. There are other administrative entities like department and village. An urban commune has typically 10,000 people under it. If any commune is not able to get 75 per cent of its planned budget in revenues for 3 years, the autonomy is taken off. The communes are administered by elected Mayors. The communes are stipulated to develop economic, social and cultural values of its citizens. A commune has financial autonomy and can interact with other communes, government agencies or international entities.
