= Namissiguima Department, Sanmatenga =

Namissiguima
- Department
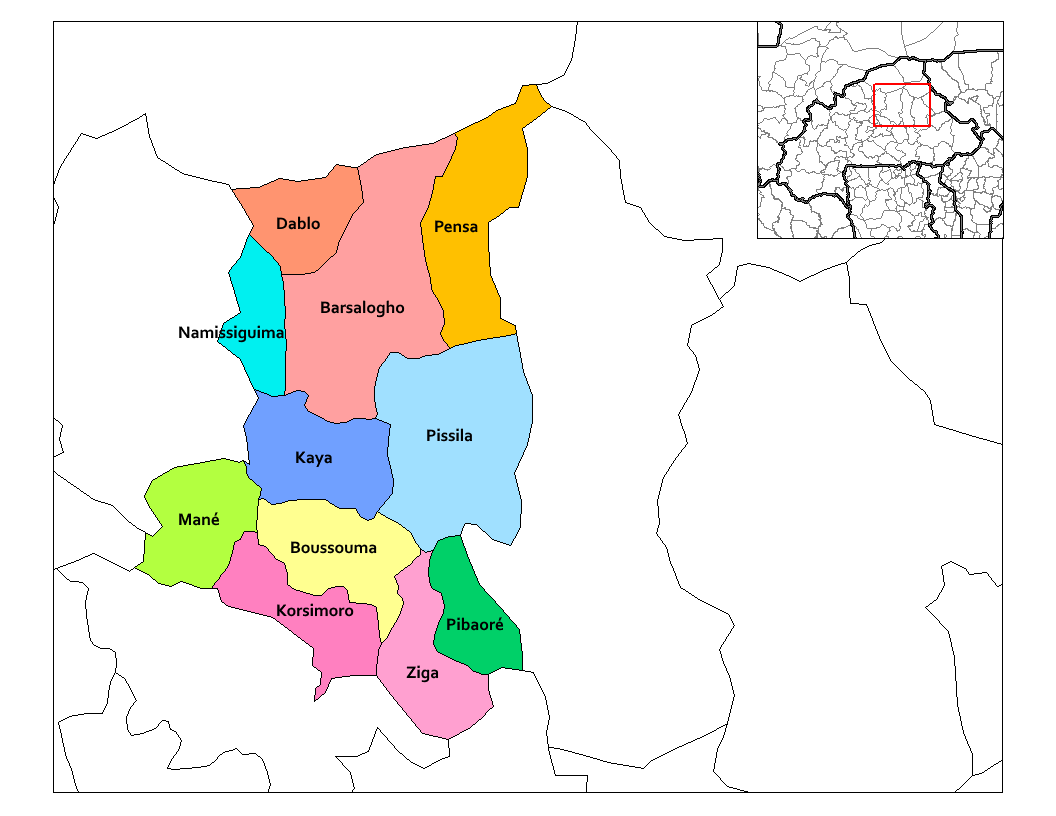
- Namissiguima Department, Sanmatega location in the province
- Country: Burkina Faso
- Province: Sanmatenga Province

Area
  - Total: 157.8 sq mi (408.7 km^{2})

Population (2019 census)
  - Total: 16,559
  - Density: 104.9/sq mi (40.52/km^{2})
- Time zone: UTC+0 (GMT 0)

Namissiguima is a department or commune of Sanmatenga Province in central Burkina Faso. Its capital lies at the town of Namissiguima.
