= Yako, Burkina Faso =

Yako
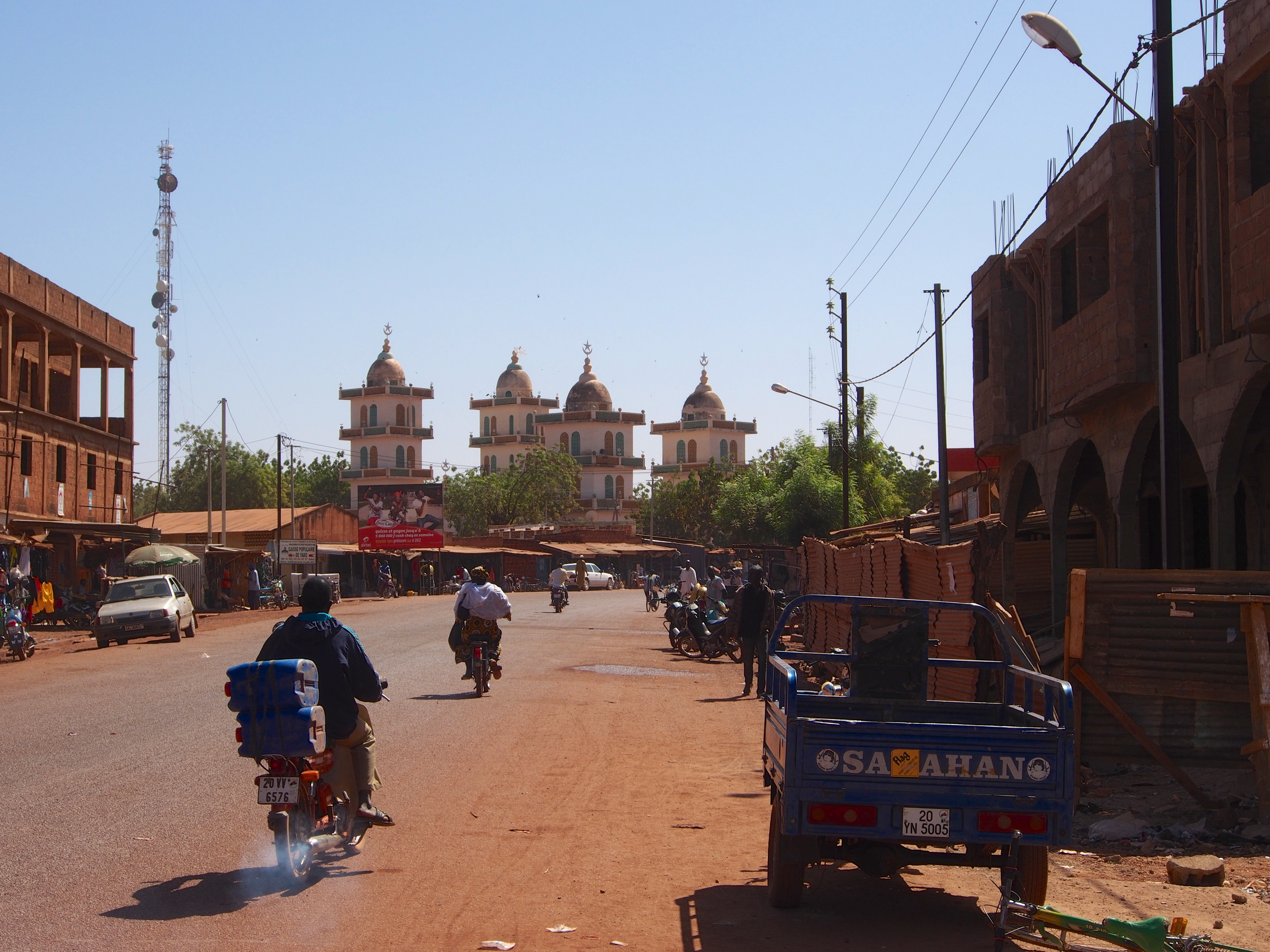
- Yako

- Location within Burkina Faso
- Coordinates: 12°58′N 2°16′W
- Country: Burkina Faso
- Regions: Nord Region
- Province: Passoré Province
- Elevation: 301 m (988 ft)

Population (2019 census)
  - Total: 38,679
- Time zone: UTC+0 (GMT)

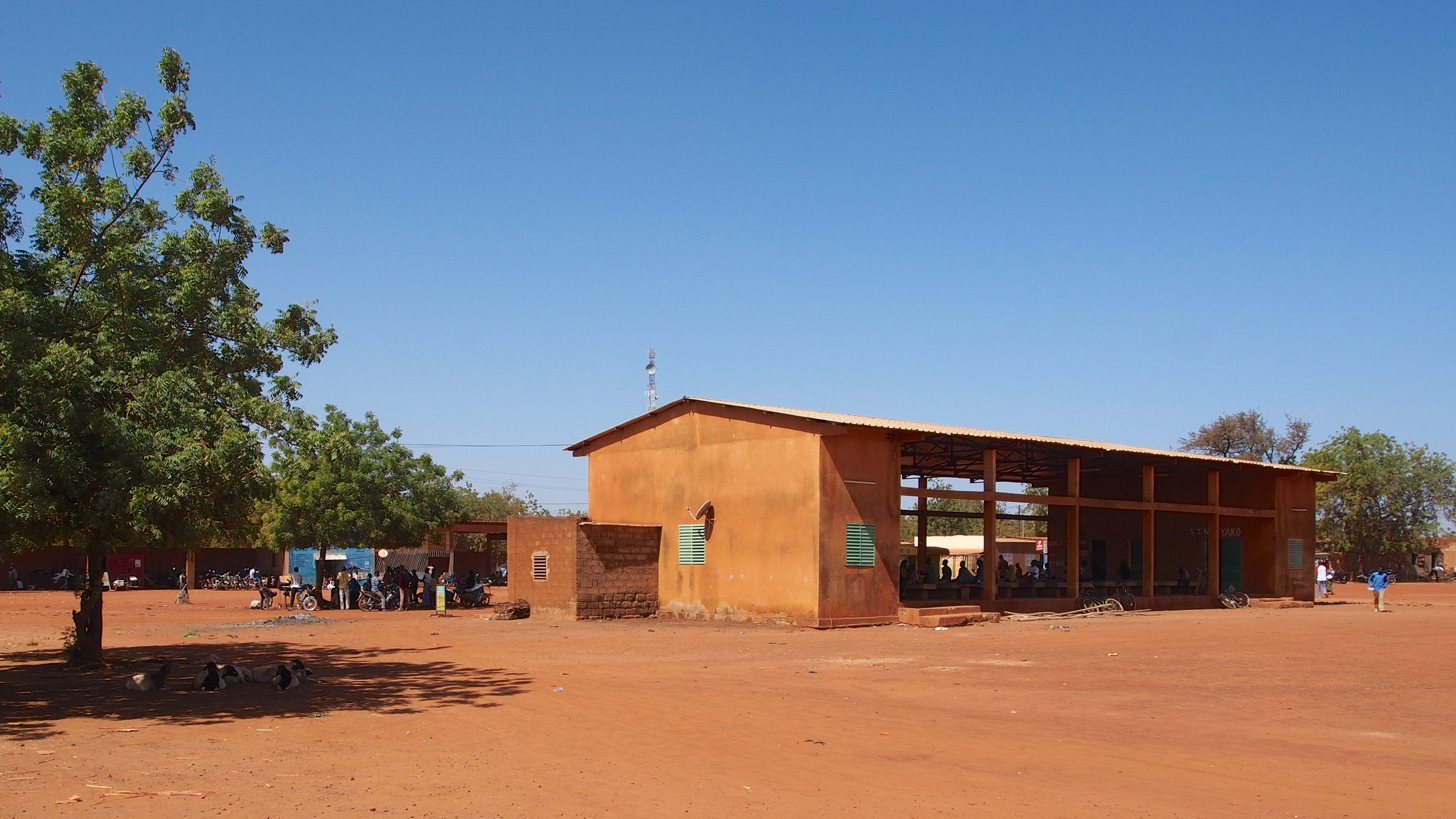
Bus station of Yako

Yako is a town in northern Burkina Faso, the capital of Passoré Province. It lies 109 kilometres (68 mi) north-west of Ouagadougou. Yako is known for its large mosque and as the birthplace of former President Thomas Sankara.

== Climate ==
Köppen-Geiger climate classification system classifies its climate as hot semi-arid (BSh).

Climate data for Yako
Month	Jan	Feb	Mar	Apr	May	Jun	Jul	Aug	Sep	Oct	Nov	Dec	Year
Mean daily maximum °C (°F)	33.6 (92.5)	36.2 (97.2)	38.3 (100.9)	38.7 (101.7)	36.9 (98.4)	34.1 (93.4)	31.8 (89.2)	30.7 (87.3)	31.9 (89.4)	35.2 (95.4)	36.1 (97.0)	33.8 (92.8)	34.8 (94.6)
Daily mean °C (°F)	25.4 (77.7)	27.6 (81.7)	30.5 (86.9)	31.6 (88.9)	30.6 (87.1)	28.3 (82.9)	26.8 (80.2)	25.9 (78.6)	26.6 (79.9)	28.2 (82.8)	27.7 (81.9)	25.5 (77.9)	27.9 (82.2)
Mean daily minimum °C (°F)	17.2 (63.0)	19.1 (66.4)	22.7 (72.9)	24.6 (76.3)	24.3 (75.7)	22.6 (72.7)	21.8 (71.2)	21.2 (70.2)	21.3 (70.3)	21.2 (70.2)	19.3 (66.7)	17.2 (63.0)	21.0 (69.9)
Average precipitation mm (inches)	0 (0)	0 (0)	4 (0.2)	16 (0.6)	51 (2.0)	93 (3.7)	171 (6.7)	191 (7.5)	116 (4.6)	24 (0.9)	1 (0.0)	1 (0.0)	668 (26.2)
Source: Climate-Data.org (altitude: 333m)
