= Titao =

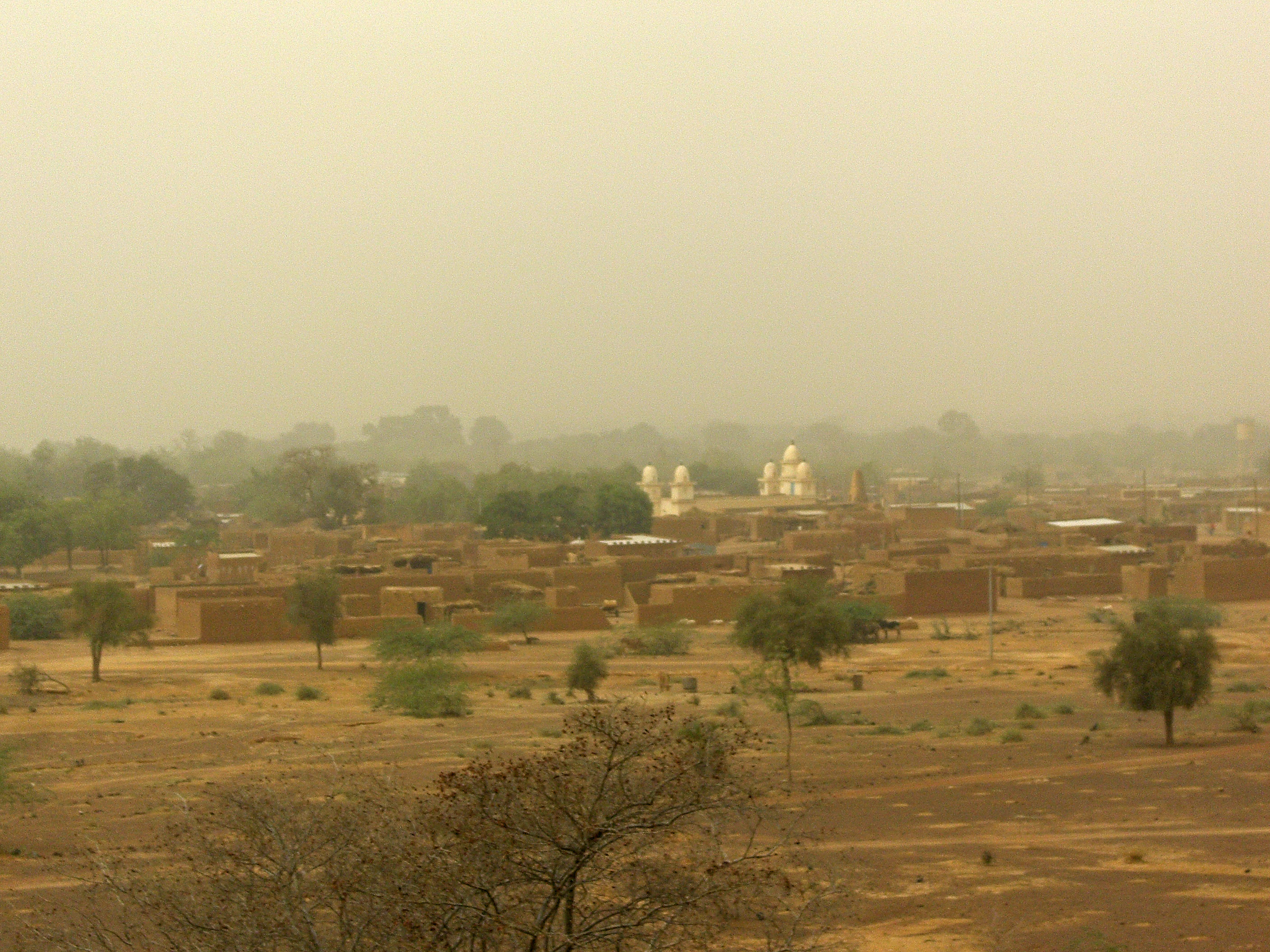
- Titao (2007)

- Location within Burkina Faso
- Coordinates: 13.76884°N 2.07179°W
- Country: Burkina Faso
- Province: Loroum Province
- Elevation: 289 m (948 ft)

Population (2019 census)
  - Total: 48,241
- Time zone: UTC+0 (GMT)
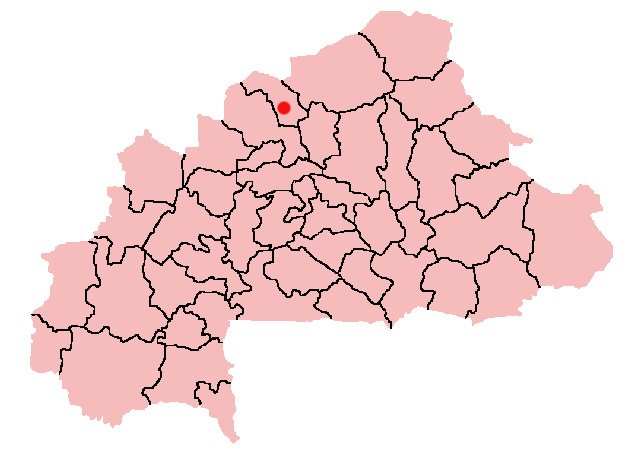
- Location of Titao in Burkina Faso

Titao is a town located in the province of Loroum in Burkina Faso. It is the capital of Loroum Province. Since 2019 it has been under siege by Islamic rebels.
