= Passoré Province =

Coordinates: 12°57′N 2°16′W

Passoré
- Province
- Location in Burkina Faso

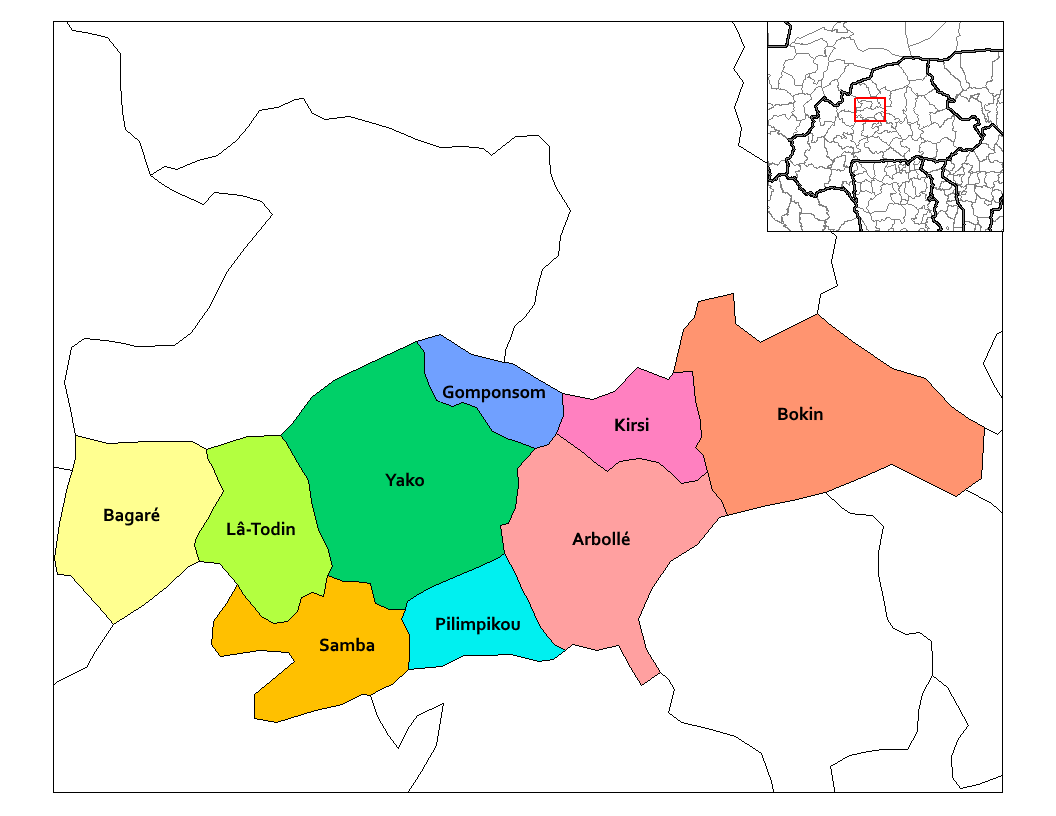
- Provincial map of its departments
- Country: Burkina Faso
- Region: Nord Region
- Capital: Yako

Area
  - Province: 3,866 km^{2} (1,493 sq mi)

Population (2019 census)
  - Province: 457,781
  - Density: 118.4/km^{2} (306.7/sq mi)
  - Urban: 38,679
- Time zone: UTC+0 (GMT 0)

Passoré (French pronunciation: [pasɔʁe]) is one of the 45 provinces of Burkina Faso, located in the Nord Region. Its capital city is Yako.

== Education ==
In 2011 the province had 316 primary schools and 39 secondary schools.

== Healthcare ==
In 2011 the province had 42 health and social promotion centers (Centres de santé et de promotion sociale), 3 doctors and 73 nurses.

== Departments ==
Passoré is divided into 9 departments:

Department	Capital	Population (Census 2006)
Arbollé Department	Arbollé	21,202
Bagaré Department	Bagaré	40,038
Bokin Department	Bokin	55,968
Gomponsom Department	Gomponsom	19,884
Kirsi Department	Kirsi	10,746
Lâ-Todin Department	Lâ-Todin	28,077
Pilimpikou Department	Pilimpikou	19,884
Samba Department	Samba	10,746
Yako Department	Yako	28,077

== See also ==
- Regions of Burkina Faso
- Provinces of Burkina Faso
- Departments of Burkina Faso
