= Sandbondtenga Province =

Sandbondtenga
- Province
- Location in Burkina Faso

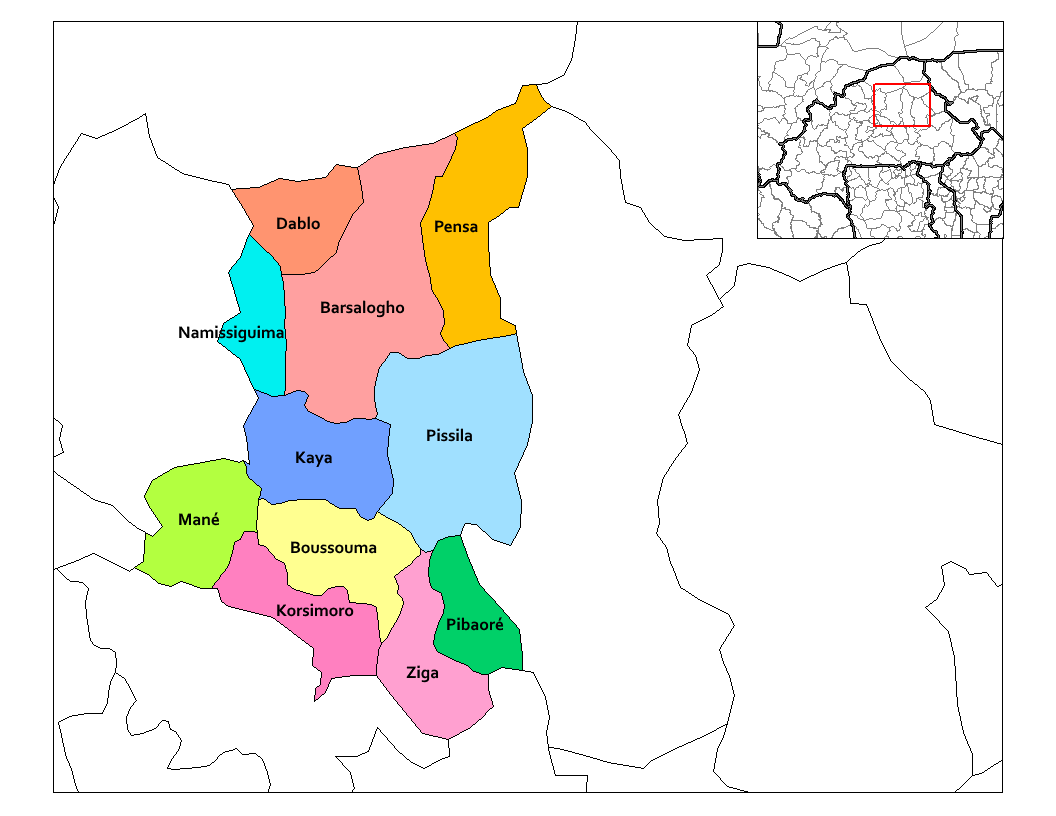
- Provincial map of its departments
- Coordinates: 13°15′N 1°05′W
- Country: Burkina Faso
- Region: Centre-Nord Region
- Capital: Kaya

Area
  - Province: 9,290 km^{2} (3,590 sq mi)

Population (2019 census)
  - Province: 885,642
  - Density: 95.3/km^{2} (247/sq mi)
  - Urban: 121,970
- Time zone: UTC+0 (GMT 0)
- ISO 3166 code: BF-SMT

Sandbondtenga (known as Sanmatenga before 2025) is one of the 45 provinces of Burkina Faso, located in its Centre-Nord Region.

Its capital is Kaya.

== Departments ==
Sandbondtenga is divided into 10 departments:

- Barsalogho Department
- Boussouma Department
- Dablo Department
- Kaya Department
- Korsimoro Department
- Mané Department
- Namissiguima Department
- Pensa Department
- Pibaoré Department
- Pissila Department
- Ziga Department

== See also ==
- Departments of Burkina Faso
- Regions of Burkina Faso
- Provinces of Burkina Faso
- September 2019 Sanmatenga attacks
- 2024 Barsalogho attack
