= Justin Damo Baro =

Burkinabe Minister of Finance between 1983 and 1986

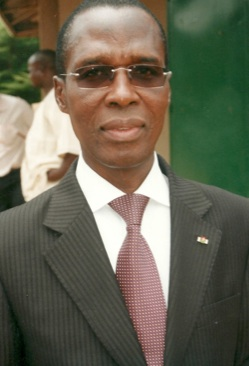
- Baro in 2012

Acting Governor of the Central Bank of West African States
- In office December 23, 2005 – March 29, 2008
- Preceded by: Charles Konan Banny
- Succeeded by: Philippe-Henri Dacoury-Tabley

Minister of Finance of Burkina Faso
- In office February 1983 – 1986
- President: Thomas Sankara
- Preceded by: Pascal Sanou
- Succeeded by: Talata Eugène Dondassé

Personal details
- Born: December 31, 1952 (age 73) Toussiana Department, Houet Province, French Upper Volta (now Burkina Faso)

Damo Justin Baro, also known as Justin Damo Barro, is a Burkinabe economist and politician who served as Minister of Finance between 1983 and 1986 under Thomas Sankara. During that time, he was President of ECOWAS' Council of Ministers. In the 1990s, he served in the World Bank, and later helped create the West African Economic and Monetary Union.

== Early life ==
Baro was born on December 31, 1952, in Toussiana, Houet Province, French Upper Volta (now Burkina Faso), and spent most of his youth in Bobo-Dioulasso. Baro obtained a master's degree in business law at the University of Poitiers in 1975, a diploma in treasury inspection at the National Treasury School, and a degree in development economics from the Paris Nanterre University in 1993. Baro returned to Upper Volta in 1978, entering a career as a bureaucrat.

== Career ==
Baro began his career in Burkina Faso in 1978 as the head of the studies and regulations department of the Treasury and Public Accounting sector of Upper Volta's Ministry of the Economy. He then became Director General of the Budget of the Treasury in 1979. After the 1983 Upper Voltan coup d'état, Baro became Minister of Finance between 1983 and 1986, and held several economy-related positions during Thomas Sankara's administration. At that same time, Baro was President of the ECOWAS Council of Ministers and President of the Board of Directors of the ECOWAS fund between 1985 and 1986. In 1985, Baro was appointed as a financial analyst of the World Bank's Africa division, a position he held until 1994.

Baro was appointed economic advisor to the Burkinabe president in 1994, and also went on to help found the West African Economic and Monetary Union. He worked at the WAEMU as commissioner of the economic policies department until 1996, when he was appointed as vice-governor of the Central Bank of West African States (CBWAS), replacing Kadre Desire Ouedraogo. Baro's role as vice-governor of CBWAS was renewed twice; in 1998 and in 2003. He was appointed acting governor on December 23, 2005, following Charles Konan Banny's accession as Prime Minister of Ivory Coast. In 2008 Philippe-Henri Dacoury-Tabley was appointed to governor, instigating Baro's departure. After this, Baro was suspected to be appointed by Blaise Compaoré as Burkinabe ambassador to Paris. In December 2010, Baro was appointed as chairman of the board of directors of the International Bank of Burkina, a subsidiary of the United Bank for Africa.

Following the 2014 Burkina Faso uprising, Justin Damo Baro left his position as special advisor to Honoré Traoré in December 2014. In February 2020, Baro spoke at a conference regarding Burkina Faso's transition away from CFA franc, speaking in favor of keeping the CFA franc. In February 2024, Baro advised economists at the International Forum for Stock Market Investment in Ouagadougou.
