= Kangala =

- Department
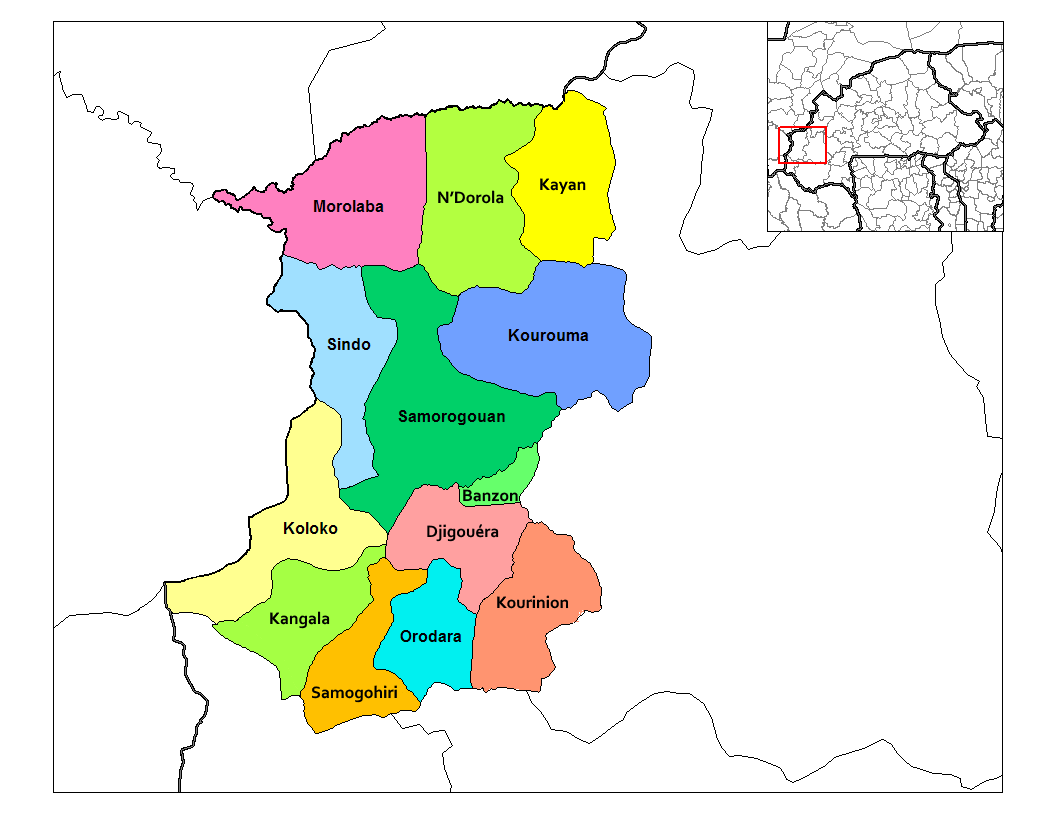
- Kangala Department location in the province
- Country: Burkina Faso
- Region: Hauts-Bassins Region
- Province: Kénédougou Province

Population (2012)
  - Total: 23,037
- Time zone: UTC+0 (GMT 0)

Kangala is a department or commune of Kénédougou Province in Burkina Faso.
