= Faramana =

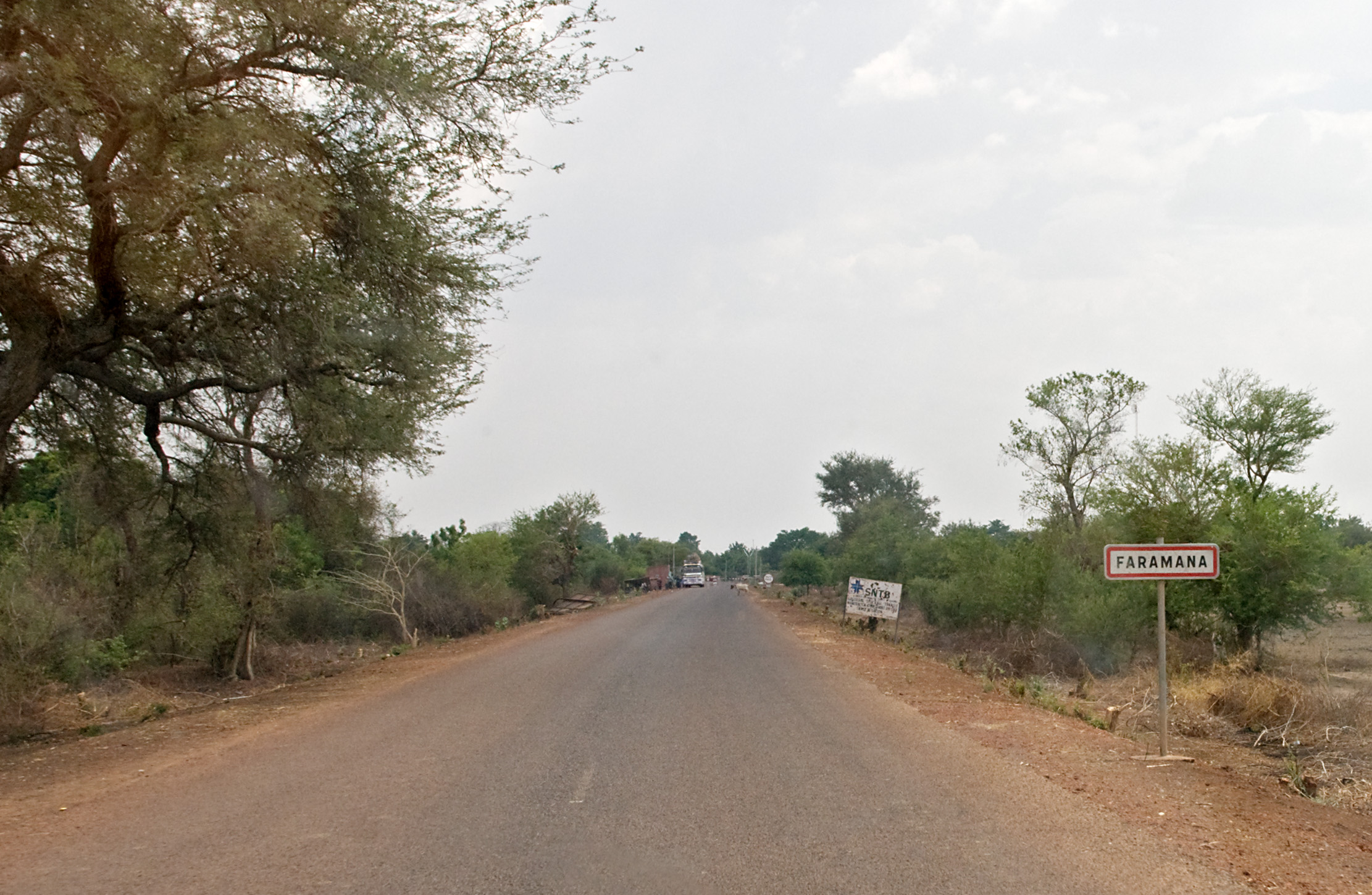
- Approach from Malian border

- Location within Burkina Faso
- Coordinates: 12.044693°N 4.669189°W
- Country: Burkina Faso
- Region: Hauts-Bassins
- Province: Houet
- Department: Faramana
- Time zone: UTC+0 (GMT)
- Climate: Aw

Faramana is a town in Houet Province (Hauts-Bassins Region) in western Burkina Faso, near the border of Mali.

It is the capital of Faramana Department, which further consists of 7 villages:

- Bambe
- Biena
- Koakourima
- Kobi
- Kouni
- Siankoro
- Ty

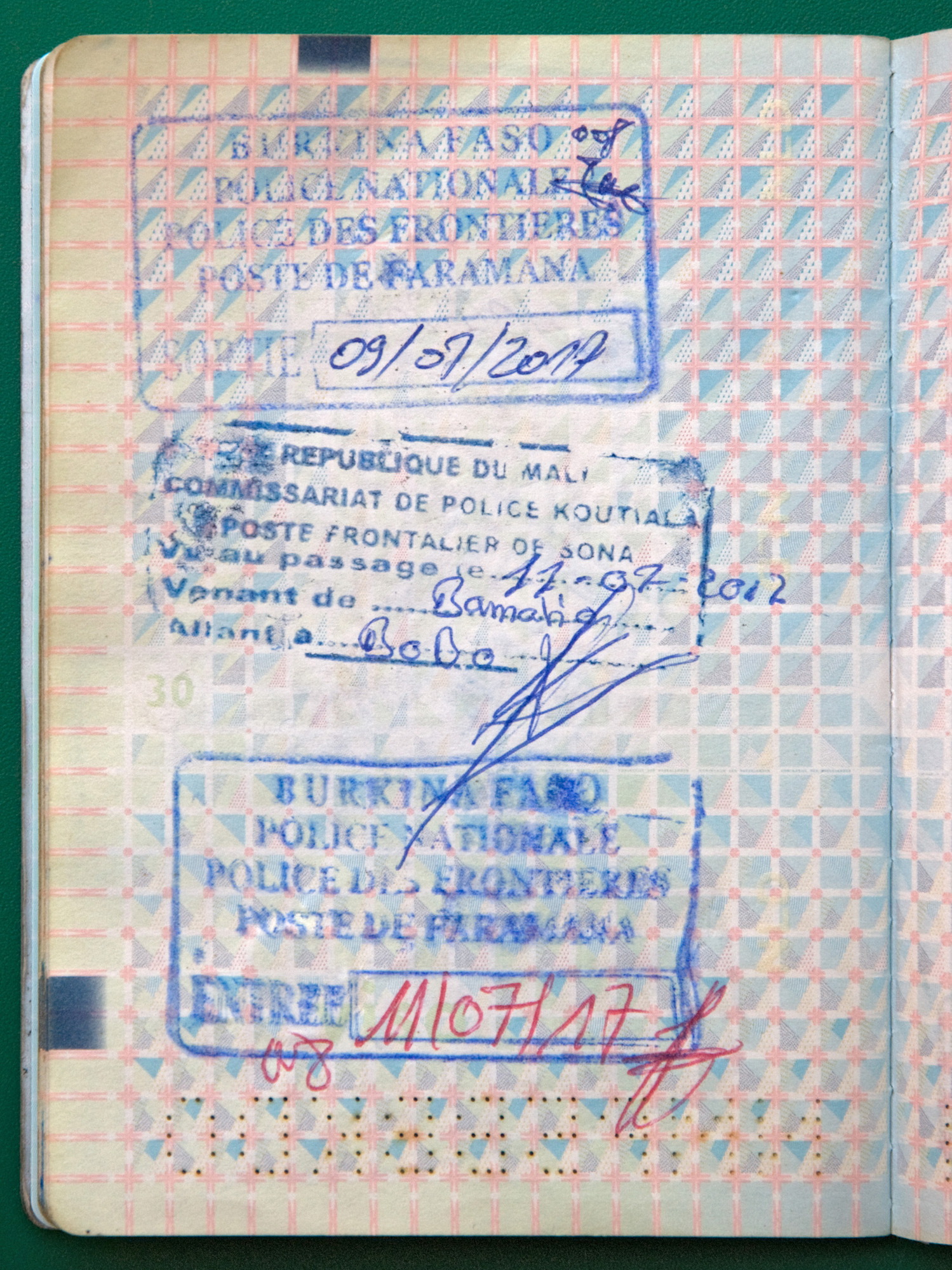
Passport page with stamps of the Burkinabé border police at Faramana and the Malian border police at Sona (July 2017)

Faramana is a bordertown near the border with Mali on the Route nationale N9, the Burkina Faso part of the trunk road from Bobo-Dioulasso to Koutiala. The border police station in Faramana is 1.2 km from the actual border (from which it is another 3.8 km to its counterpart in Mali, the border police station at Sona (Mahou rural commune, Yorosso Cercle)).
