= Orodara Department =

Coordinates: 10°58′N 4°54′W

Orodara
- Department
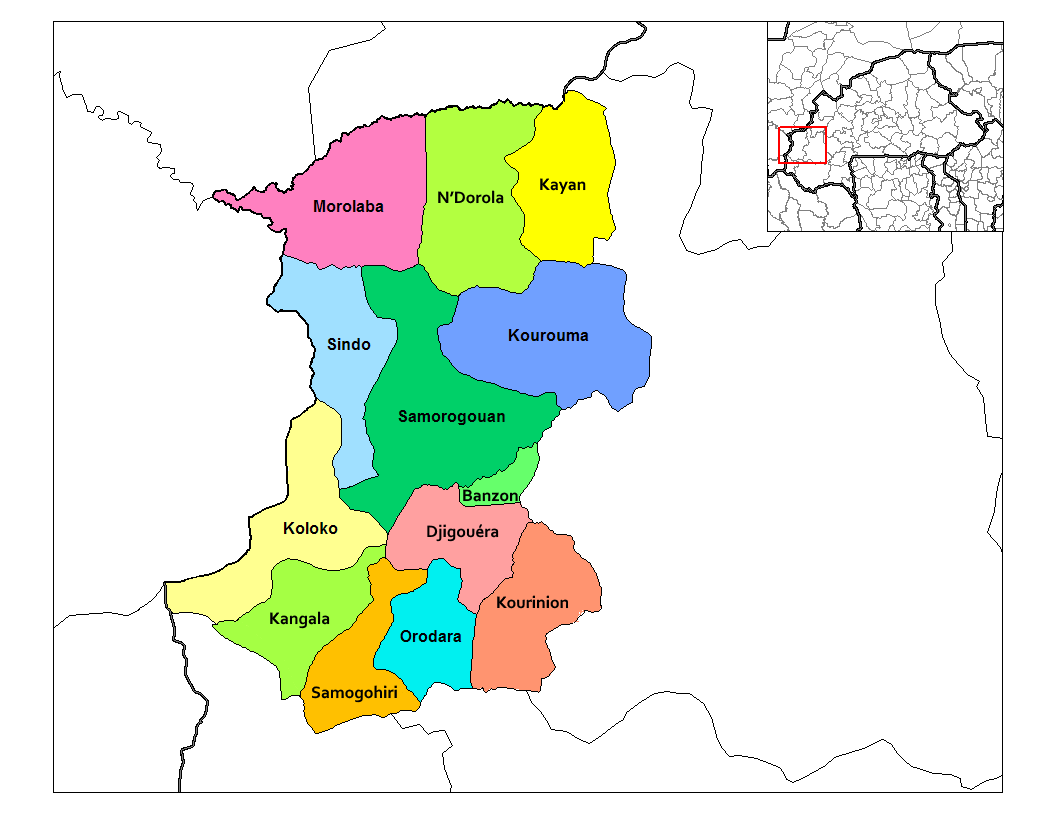
- Orodara Department location in the province
- Country: Burkina Faso
- Province: Kénédougou Province

Area
  - Department: 156 sq mi (405 km^{2})

Population (2019 census)
  - Department: 44,679
  - Density: 286/sq mi (110/km^{2})
  - Urban: 33,423
- Time zone: UTC+0 (GMT 0)

Orodara is a department or commune of Kénédougou Province in south-western Burkina Faso. Its capital is the town of Orodara.
