= Samorogouan attack =

2015 battle in Burkina Faso

- Part of Jihadist insurgency in Burkina Faso
Date	October 9, 2015
Location	Samorogouan Department, Kenedougou Province, Burkina Faso
Result	Indecisive

Belligerents
Burkina Faso	Ansar Dine: Khalid ibn Walid katiba

Commanders and leaders
Theophile Bonko	Boubacar Sawadogo

Casualties and losses
3 killed 1 missing	None
- 2 civilians killed, 1 injured

On October 9, 2015, jihadists from the Khalid ibn Walid katiba of Ansar Dine attacked a Burkinabe gendarmerie outpost in Samorogouan Department, Burkina Faso. The attack was one of the first deadly attacks during the jihadist insurgency in Burkina Faso.

== Background ==
In 2012, Tuaregs in northern Mali rebelled against the Malian government, and two factions arose out of the various rebel groups. Jihadist groups such as Ansar Dine took over large swathes of Mali, and were eventually forced into an insurgency by Operation Barkhane. Following the instability after the 2014 Burkina Faso uprising and the new government's crackdown on Islamist groups to prevent a spillover of the war, jihadist groups from Mali began expanding into Burkina Faso.

Residents of Samorogouan had reported being robbed by men in turbans, and also stated that they had called the local gendarmerie brigade, but there was no response.

== Attack ==
The attack took place at a Territorial Gendarmerie Brigade outpost in the town of Samorogouan, Kénédougou Province, Burkina Faso, near the Malian border. The day before the attack, armed jihadists had invaded the town and attacked public buildings, sparking a firefight where seven of the jihadists' motorcycles were captured and they were forced to retreat. That night, jihadists attacked the brigade's base at around 4am with more weapons, killing two soldiers. The head of Samorogouan department stated that he had heard gunshots around that time intensifying closer to the base, before dwindling and being heard in a forest close by. During the jihadists' escape from the base, one more soldier was killed and one was kidnapped.

Burkinabe reinforcements did not arrive at the scene until 6am, at which point the jihadists had fled and burned vehicles that had come from Orodara the evening prior to reinforce the base. A civilian also had his throat slit by the attackers, and two civilians were injured. The two men injured were rushed to a hospital, where one died. The civilian that died, Abdoulaye Sawadogo, was an Islamist, and invited the jihadists to stay at his home in Samorogouan to plan the attack. His family members denied that Sawadogo was involved and accused the police of lying as Sawadogo was one of only five Sunni Muslims in the village, although never prayed at the mosque because he didn't believe their interpretation.

Later reports revealed that Boubacar Sawadogo, the head of the Burkinabe branch of Ansar Dine's Khalid ibn Walid katiba attacked the outpost with his men. The attack was facilitated by Katiba du Sud's second-in-command Yacouba Traore.

== Aftermath ==
Several high-profile Burkinabe military leaders visited Samorogouan after the attack. General Pingrenoma Zagre visited the town and declared measures would be taken to prevent another attack. No attackers were killed during the clashes, and Burkinabe authorities stated that thirteen arrests of suspects were made in Samorogouan, Orodara, and Bobo-Dioulasso afterwards.
