= Banzon (department) =

- Department
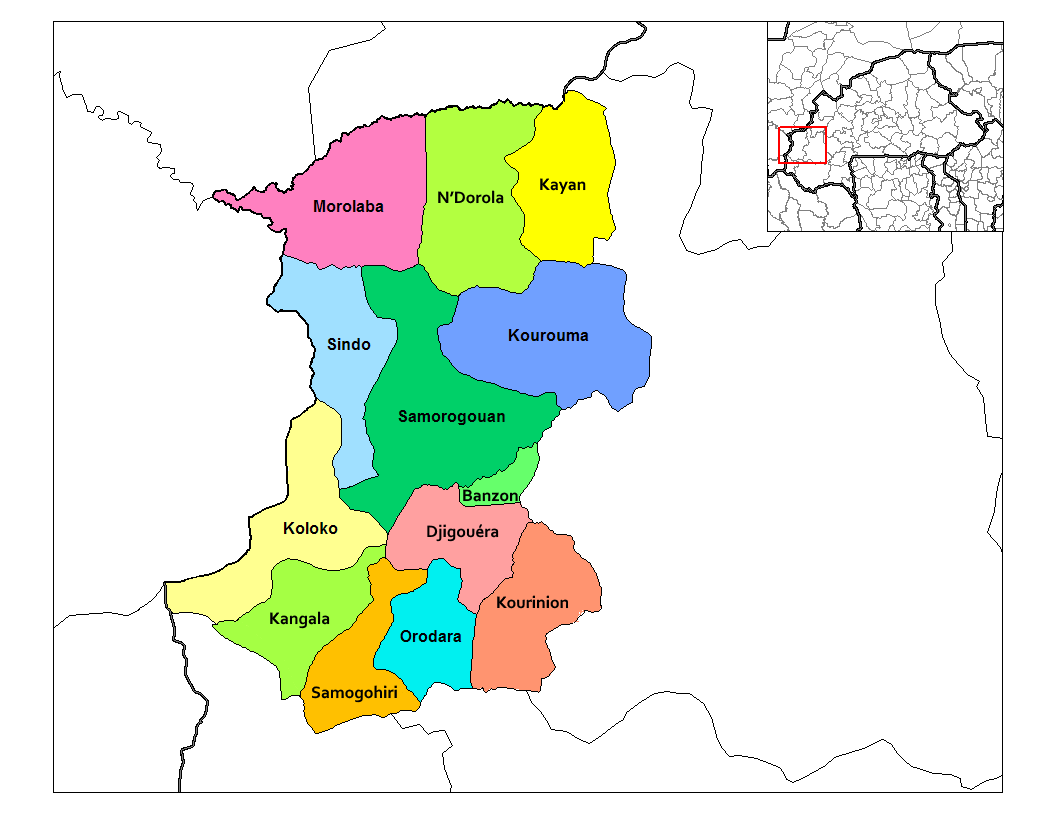
- Banzon Department location in the province
- Country: Burkina Faso
- Region: Hauts-Bassins Region
- Province: Kénédougou Province

Population (2012)
  - Total: 14,885
- Time zone: UTC+0 (GMT 0)

Banzon is a department or commune of Kénédougou Province in Burkina Faso.
