= Karangasso-Sambla =

- Village
- Location in Burkina Faso
- Coordinates: 11°13′36″N 4°38′45″W
- Country: Burkina Faso
- Regions: Hauts-Bassins Region
- Province: Houet Province
- Department: Karangasso-Sambla Department

Area
  - Total: 6.87 km^{2} (2.65 sq mi)
- Elevation: 352 m (1,155 ft)
- Time zone: UTC+0

Karangasso-Sambla, sometimes known as Karankasso, is the capital of the Karangasso-Sambla Department, Houet Province, Hauts-Bassins Region, Burkina Faso it is located along a main road 45 kilometres away from Bobo-Dioulasso. Reports on malaria in young children have been carried out in Karankasso showing a large difference in infection rates between wet and dry seasons. Karankasso is the largest community home to the Sambla people, it has a health center but healthcare has been reported to be poor in Karankasso. In 1993, 25 people died of measles in Karankasso. Karankasso's population does not have access to electricity, phone lines or education, so many people use radios instead. Karankasso's people mainly use bicycles or bush-taxis for transportation.
