= Karangasso-Sambla Department =

Karankasso-Sambla
- Department
- Interactive map of Karankasso-Sambla
- Country: Burkina Faso
- Region: Hauts-Bassins Region
- Province: Houet Province

Area
  - Total: 278.1 sq mi (720.4 km^{2})

Population (2019 census)
  - Total: 29,898
  - Density: 107.5/sq mi (41.50/km^{2})
- Time zone: UTC+0 (GMT 0)

Karangasso-Sambla is a department or commune of Houet Province in Burkina Faso.

== Cities ==
The department consists of a chief town :

- Karangasso-Sambla

and 13 villages:

- Banakorosso
- Bouende
- Diofoloma
- Gognon
- Kongolikan
- Koumbadougou
- Magafesso
- Sama-Toukouro
- Sembleni
- Sourougoudingan
- Tiara
- Torosso
- Toukoro Sambla.
