= Tanguy Barro =

Burkinabe footballer (born 1982)

Personal information
- Full name: Tanguy Sie Herman Barro
- Date of birth: 13 September 1982 (age 44)
- Place of birth: Orodara, Upper Volta
- Position: Winger

Senior career*
Years	Team	Apps	(Gls)
2000–2001	RC Bobo Dioulasso		
2001–2006	Chamois Niortais	76	(11)
2004–2005	→ RC Besançon (loan)	17	(1)
2006–2007	Racing Waregem	17	(7)
2007–2009	Eupen	21	(0)
2010	Chamois Niortais B	12	(6)
2010–2011	Cognac	7	(1)
2011–2012	Stade Ruffec	6	(1)

International career
- Burkina Faso U17
2001–2007	Burkina Faso	25	(0)
- * Club domestic league appearances and goals

Tanguy Sie Herman Barro (born 13 September 1982) is a Burkinabe former professional footballer who played as a winger for the French clubs Chamois Niortais, Besançon RC, Cognac, and Stade Ruffec as well as for the Belgian teams Racing Waregem and Eupen. He made 25 matches for the Burkina Faso national team.

== Club career ==
Barro was born in Orodara. He first joined French club Chamois Niortais from RC Bobo Dioulasso at the age of 20. He left the club in 2006, after achieving promotion to Ligue 2, going on to play for Belgian sides Racing Waregem and Eupen. He spent six months training with 1. FC Kaiserslautern II, followed by trials in Vietnam and Poland.

Barro signed with the Chamois Niortais reserves in January 2010, scoring 6 goals in 12 appearances. He moved to Cognac in the summer.

== International career ==
Barro was part of the Burkina Faso under-17 national team which finished second at the 1999 African U-17 Championship.

He was a member of the senior national team at the 2002 African Cup of Nations and the 2004 African Cup of Nations, both times failing to pass the group phase.
