= Kénédougou =

Kénédougou may be:

- Kénédougou Kingdom, pre-colonial West African state
- Kénédougou Province, province of Burkina Faso
