= Koundougou (department) =

- Department
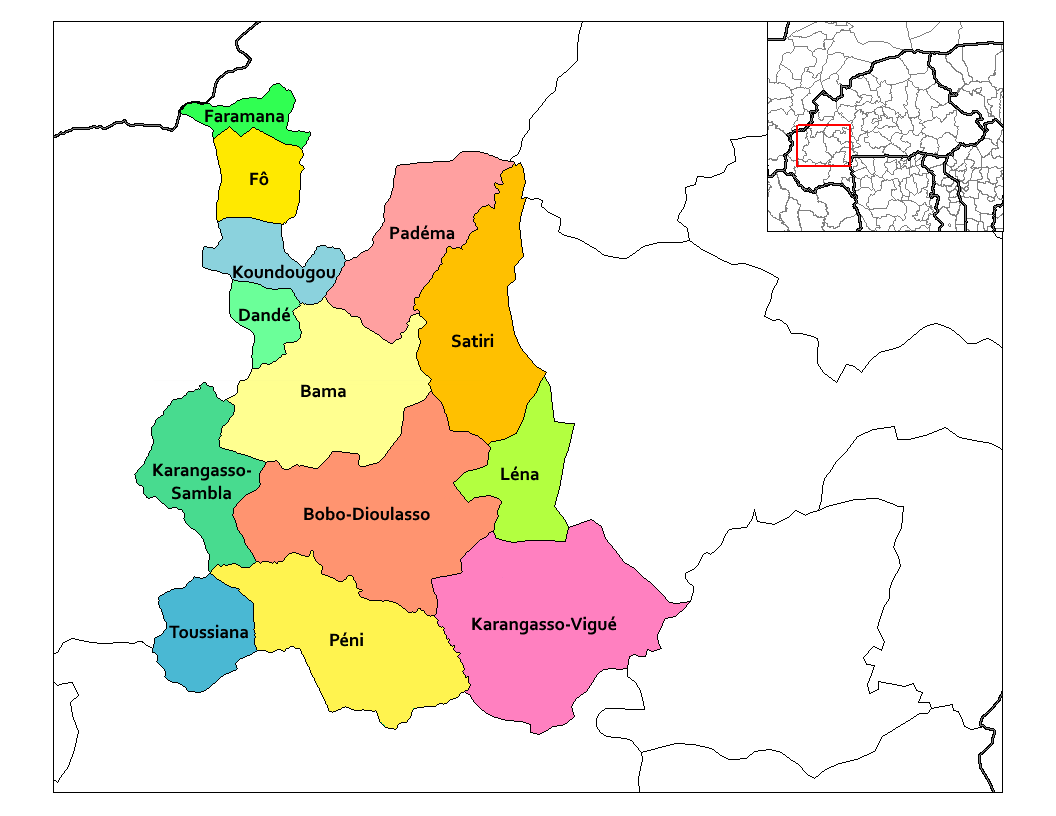
- Koundougou Department location in the province
- Country: Burkina Faso
- Region: Hauts-Bassins Region
- Province: Houet Province

Population (2012)
  - Total: 17,175
- Time zone: UTC+0 (GMT 0)

Koundougou is a department or commune of Houet Province in Burkina Faso.
