= Karangasso-Vigué Department =

Coordinates: 10.8458°N 3.9069°W

Karangasso-Vigué Karankasso-Vigué
- Department
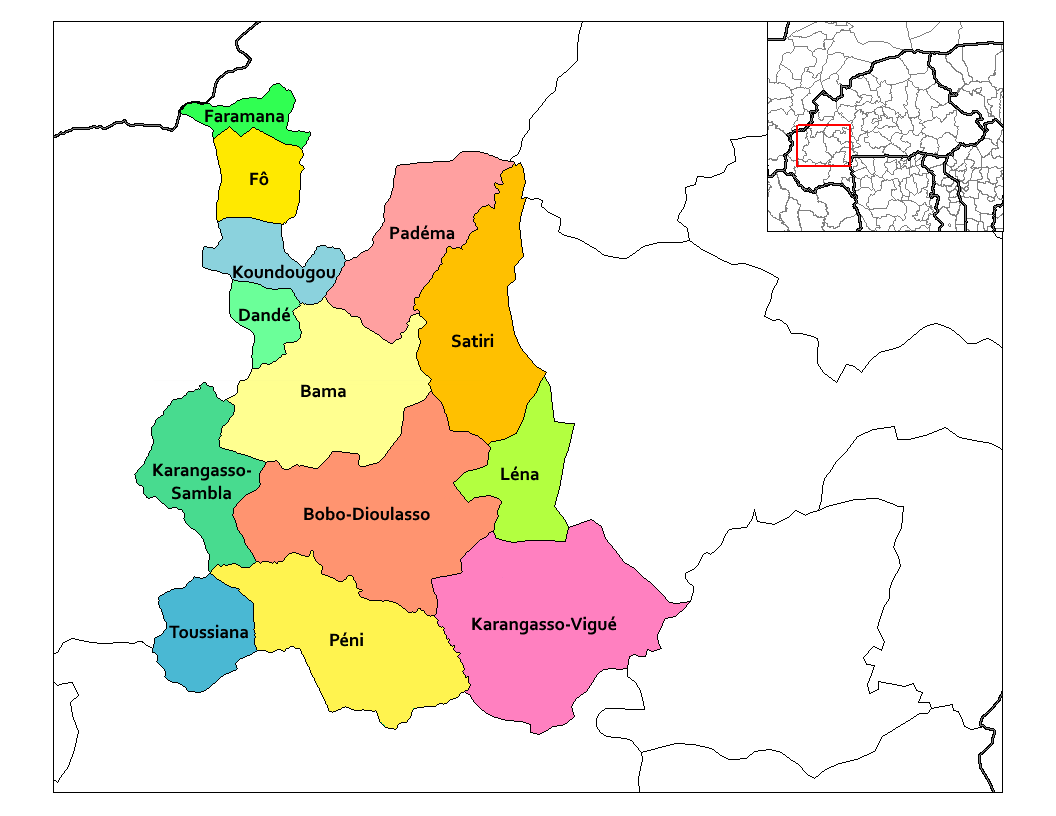
- Karangasso-Vigué Department location in the province
- Country: Burkina Faso
- Province: Houet Province

Area
  - Total: 759 sq mi (1,966 km^{2})

Population (2019 census)
  - Total: 118,402
  - Density: 156.0/sq mi (60.22/km^{2})
- Time zone: UTC+0 (GMT 0)

Karangasso-Vigué is a department or commune of Houet Province in south-western Burkina Faso. Its capital lies at the town of Karankasso-Vigue.

== Towns and villages ==
- Klesso
