= Badéma Department =

Padéma Badéma, Badéna
- Department
- Padéma
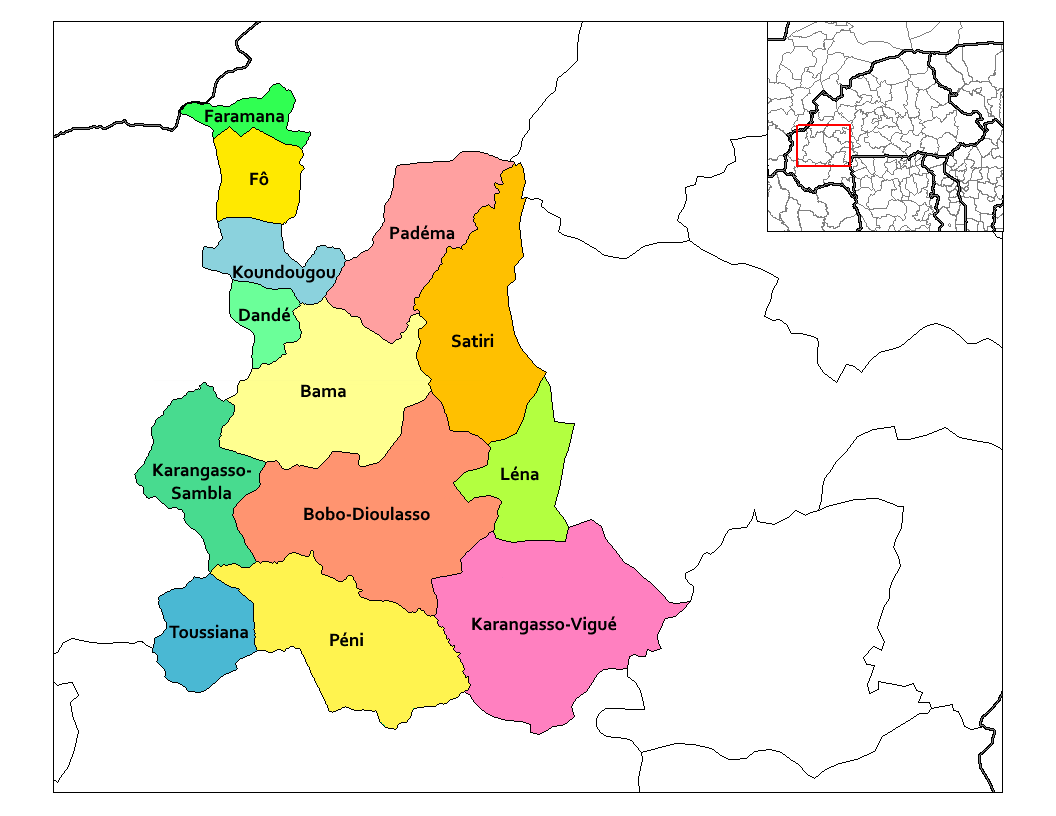
- Badéma Department location in the province
- Country: Burkina Faso
- Region: Hauts-Bassins Region
- Province: Houet Province

Area
  - Total: 358.3 sq mi (928.0 km^{2})

Population (2019 census)
  - Total: 61,859
  - Density: 172.6/sq mi (66.66/km^{2})
- Time zone: UTC+0 (GMT 0)

Padéma (official name), sometimes also named Badéma or Badéna, is a department or commune of Houet Province in Hauts-Bassins Region, Burkina Faso.
