= Djigouéra Department =

Coordinates: 11°10′N 4°55′W

Djigouéra, Burkina Faso
- Department
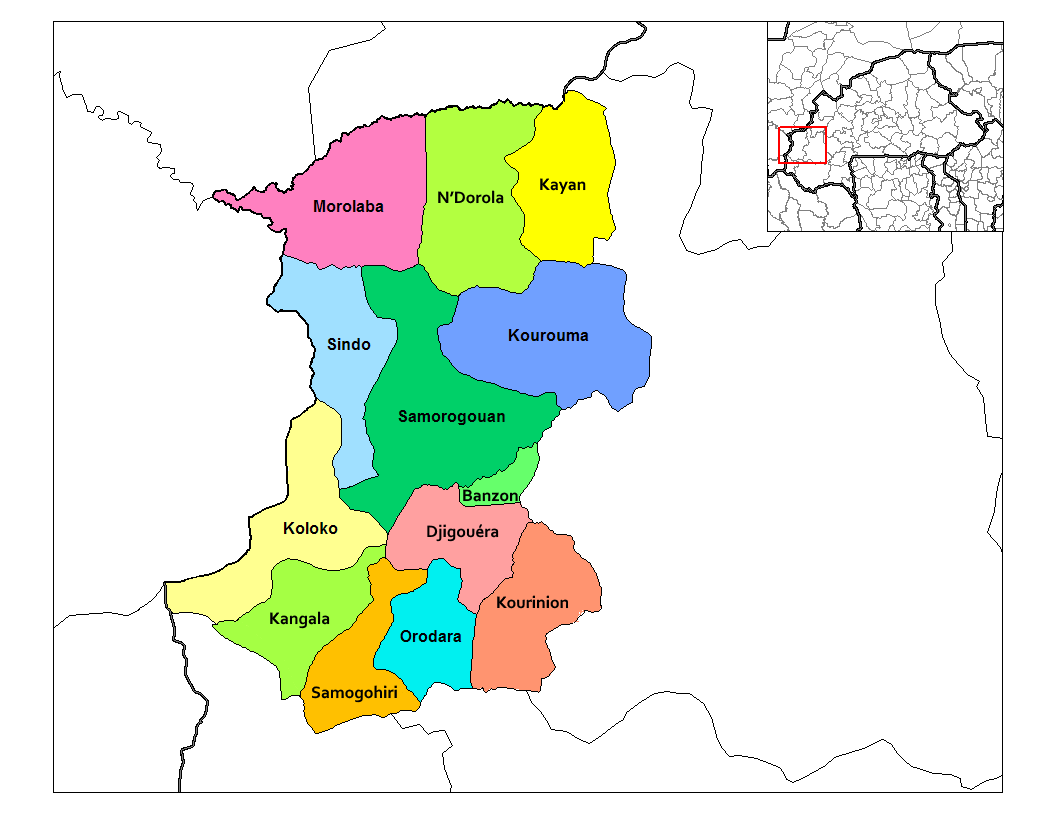
- Djigouéra Department location in the province
- Country: Burkina Faso
- Province: Kénédougou Province
- Time zone: UTC+0 (GMT 0)

Djigouéra is a department or commune of Kénédougou Province in south-western Burkina Faso. Its capital lies at the town of Djigouéra.

In 2006, the last census counted 18,284 inhabitants.
