= Samogohiri Department =

Coordinates: 10.9307267°N 5.1188146°W

Samoghohiri
- Department
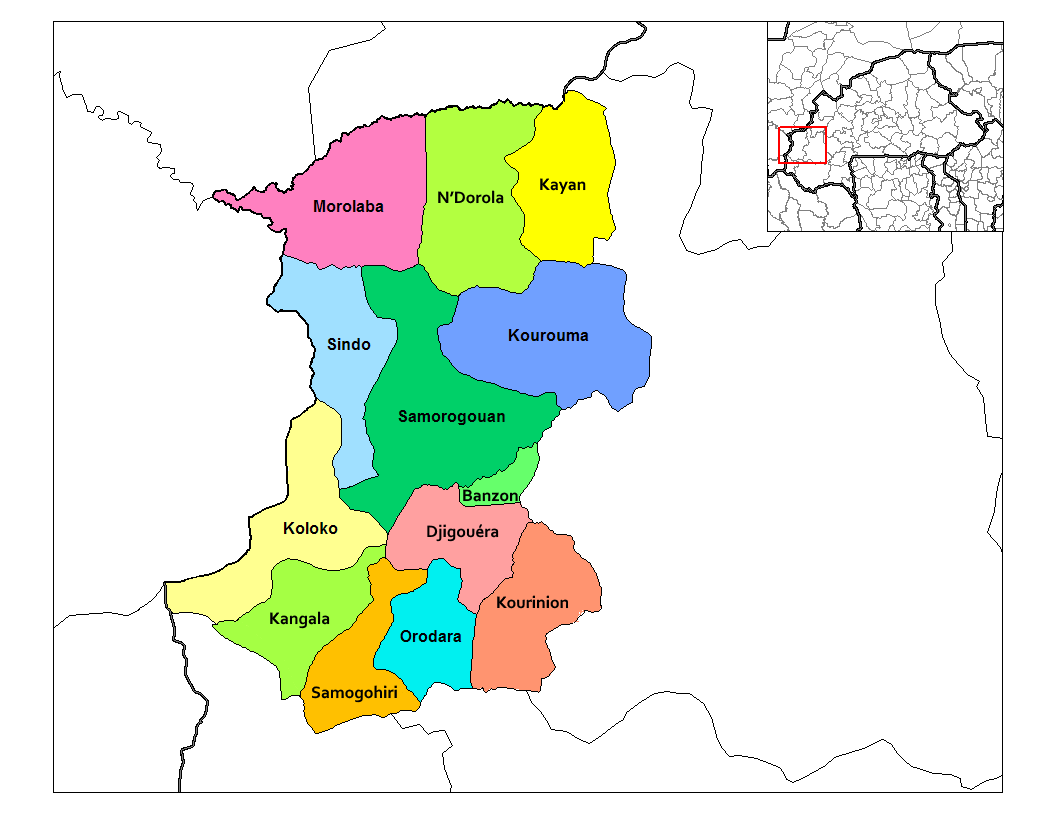
- Samogohiri Department location in the province
- Country: Burkina Faso
- Province: Kénédougou Province
- Time zone: UTC+0 (GMT 0)

Samogohiri is a department or commune of Kénédougou Province in south-western Burkina Faso. Its capital lies at the town of Samogohiri.
