= Samorogouan Department =

Coordinates: 11°24′N 4°56′W

Samorogouan
- Department
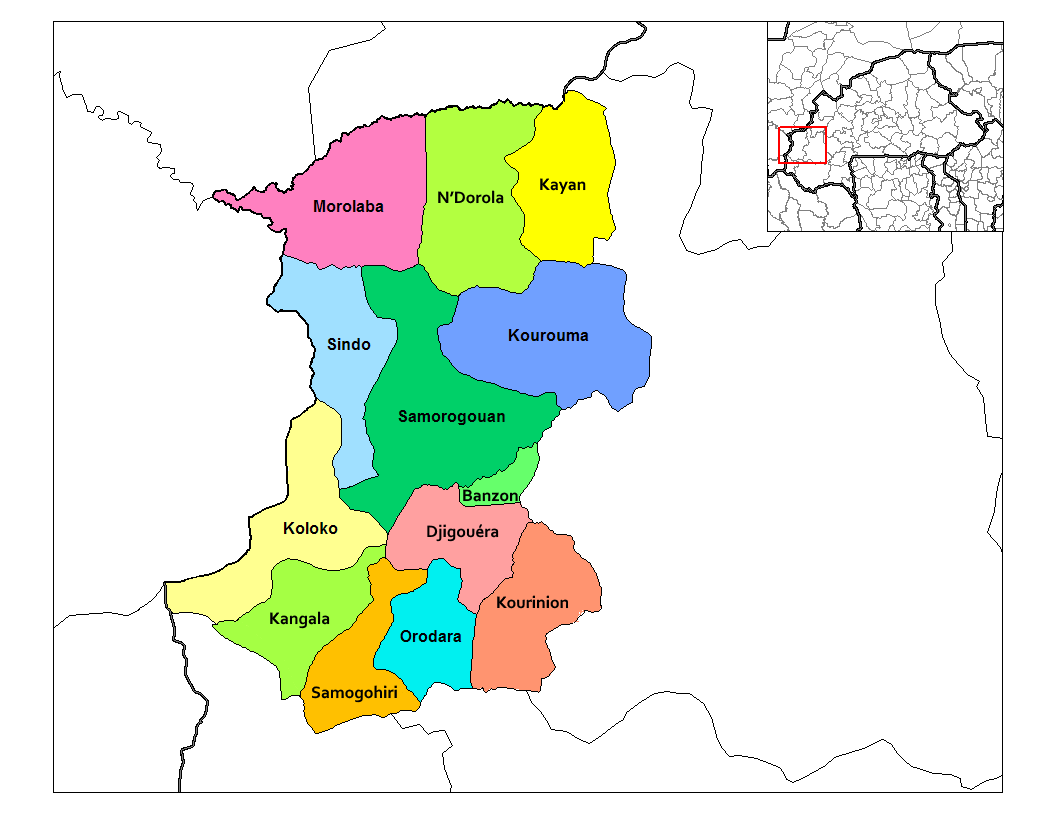
- Samorogouan Department location in the province
- Country: Burkina Faso
- Province: Kénédougou Province

Area
  - Total: 449 sq mi (1,164 km^{2})

Population (2019 census)
  - Total: 45,410
  - Density: 101.0/sq mi (39.01/km^{2})
- Time zone: UTC+0 (GMT 0)

Samorogouan is a department or commune of Kénédougou Province in south-western Burkina Faso. Its capital is the town of Samorogouan.

== See also ==
- Samorogouan attack
