= Peni =

Peni may refer to:

- Rudimentary Peni, a British anarcho-punk band
- Peni Tagive (b. 1988), an Australian rugby league player
- Peni Terepo (b. 1991), a New Zealand rugby league player
- Péni, a town in Burkina Faso in Péni Department
- Péni Department, in Burkina Faso
- Peni, Chad, in Chad
- Peni (tribe), a people of the pre-Roman Astures, in current Spain
- Peni, a Hawaiian male given name, spoken form of the pet name Ben, Hawaiian pronunciation: [/ˈpe.ni/]; spoken form of the English name Bennett is Peneki, Hawaiian pronunciation: [/peˈne.ki/].
- Peni Parker, an alternate dimension version of Spider-Man from Earth-14512

== See also ==
- Peniki
- Penis
