= Dandé (department) =

- Department
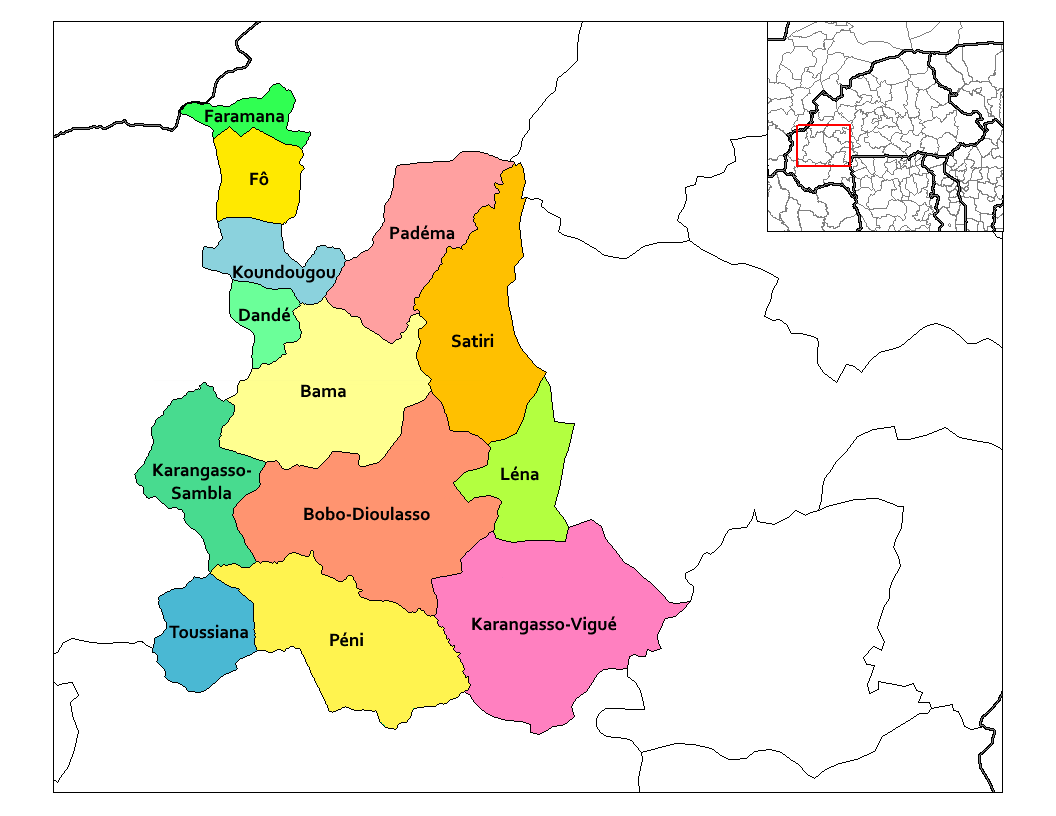
- Dandé Department location in the province
- Country: Burkina Faso
- Region: Hauts-Bassins Region
- Province: Houet Province

Population (2012)
  - Total: 11,497
- Time zone: UTC+0 (GMT 0)

Dandé is a department or commune of Houet Province in Burkina Faso.

== Cities ==
The department consists of a chief town :

- Dandé

and 4 villages:

- Bakaridougou
- Kogodjan
- Koreba
- Lanfiera Department Coura
