= Koloko Department =

Coordinates: 11°05′N 5°19′W

Koloko
- Department
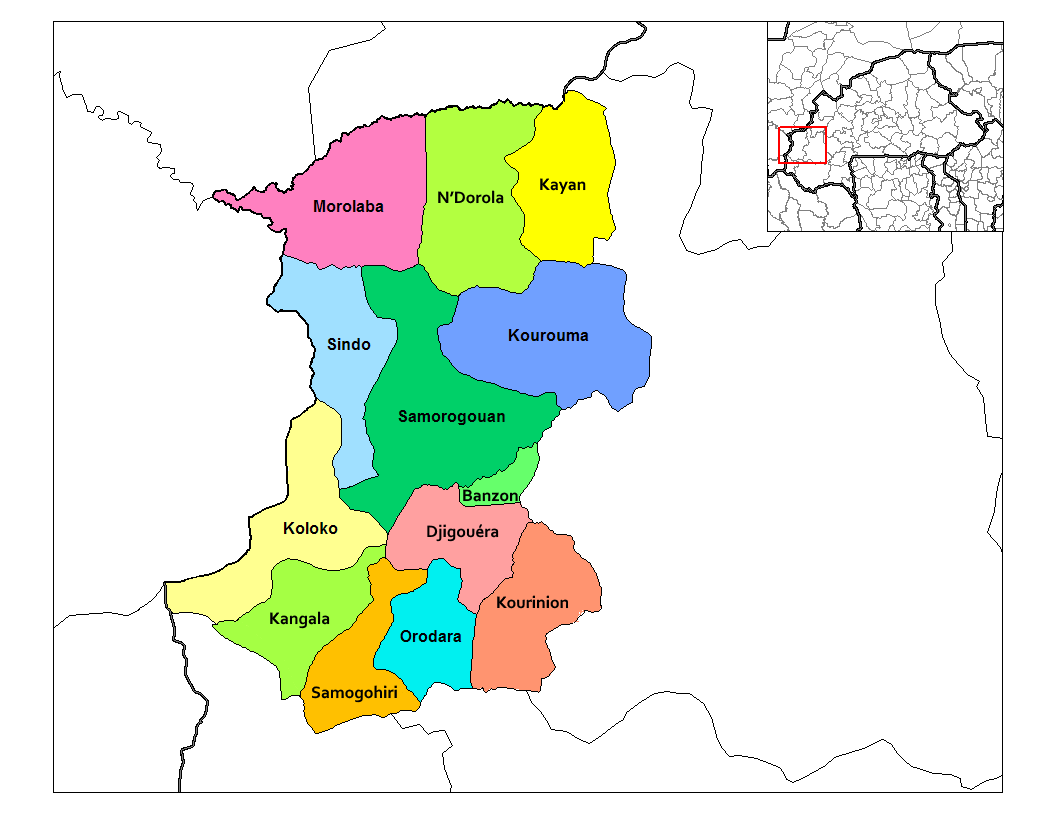
- Koloko Department location in the province
- Country: Burkina Faso
- Province: Kénédougou Province
- Time zone: UTC+0 (GMT 0)

Koloko is a department or commune of Kénédougou Province in south-western Burkina Faso. Its capital lies at the town of Koloko.
