= Rose Marie Compaoré =

Burkinabé politician (1958–2020)

2nd Vice President of the National Assembly of Burkina Faso
- In office 30 December 2015 – 18 March 2020

Personal details
- Born: November 13, 1958 Zoundwéogo
- Died: March 18, 2020 (aged 61) Ouagadougou, Burkina Faso
- Party: UPC

Rose Marie Compaoré (13 November 1958 – 18 March 2020) was a Burkinabé politician and member of the Union for Progress and Reform (UPC) political party.

== Biography ==
Compaoré, who represented Zoundwéogo Province in the National Assembly, served as Second Vice President of the National Assembly of Burkina Faso from 30 December 2015 until her death from COVID-19 on 18 March 2020. Compaoré was the first recorded patient to die from novel coronavirus in both Burkina Faso and Sub-Saharan Africa during the 2020 pandemic.

Compaoré died from complications of coronavirus (COVID-19) on 18 March 2020 at Centre hospitalier universitaire de Tengandogo in Ouagadougou at the age of 62. Her death was soon confirmed by the Union for Progress and Reform party leadership. She had suffered from other pre-existing conditions, including diabetes.

Compaoré's death was the first recorded COVID-19 fatality in Sub-Saharan Africa and Burkina Faso.
