= Bobo-Dioulasso Department =

Coordinates: 11.1830°N 4.2830°W

Bobo-Dioulasso
- Department
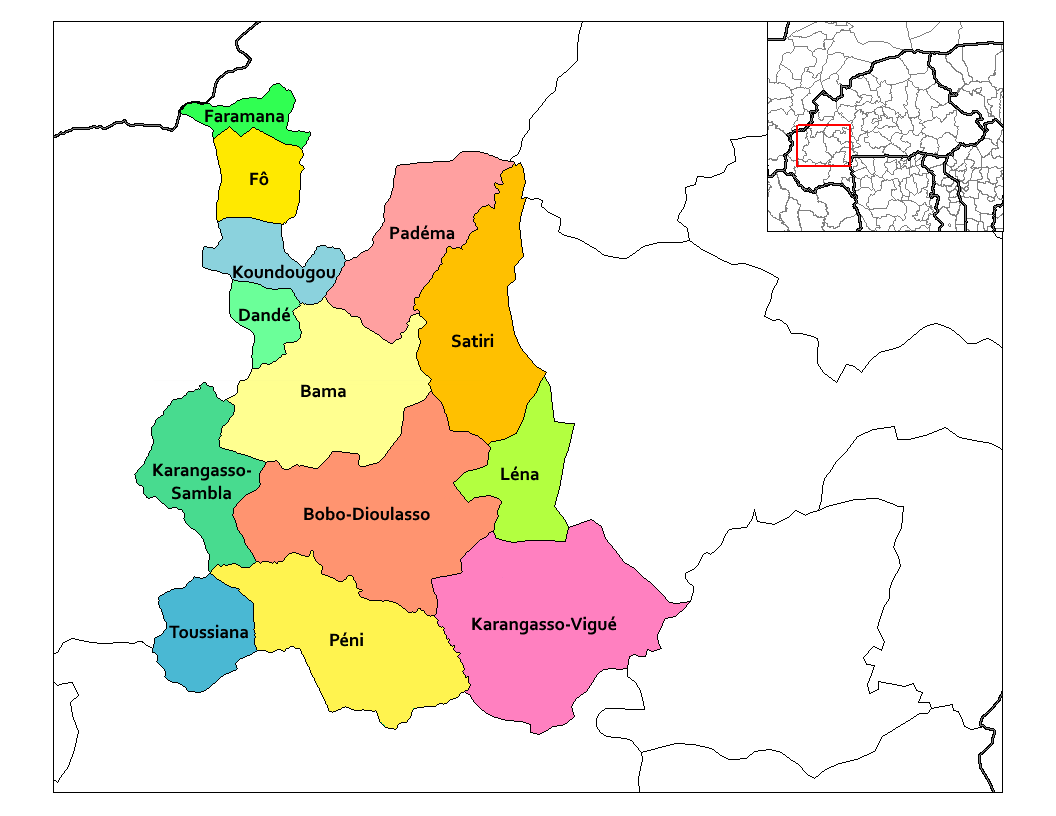
- Bobo-Dioulasso Department location in the province
- Country: Burkina Faso
- Province: Houet Province

Area
  - Department: 697 sq mi (1,806 km^{2})

Population (2019 census)
  - Department: 983,552
  - Density: 1,411/sq mi (544.6/km^{2})
  - Urban: 904,920
- Time zone: UTC+0 (GMT 0)

Bobo-Dioulasso is a department or commune of Houet Province in south-western Burkina Faso. Its capital is the town of Bobo-Dioulasso.
