= Fô Department =

Coordinates: 11°53′N 4°31′W

Fo
- Department
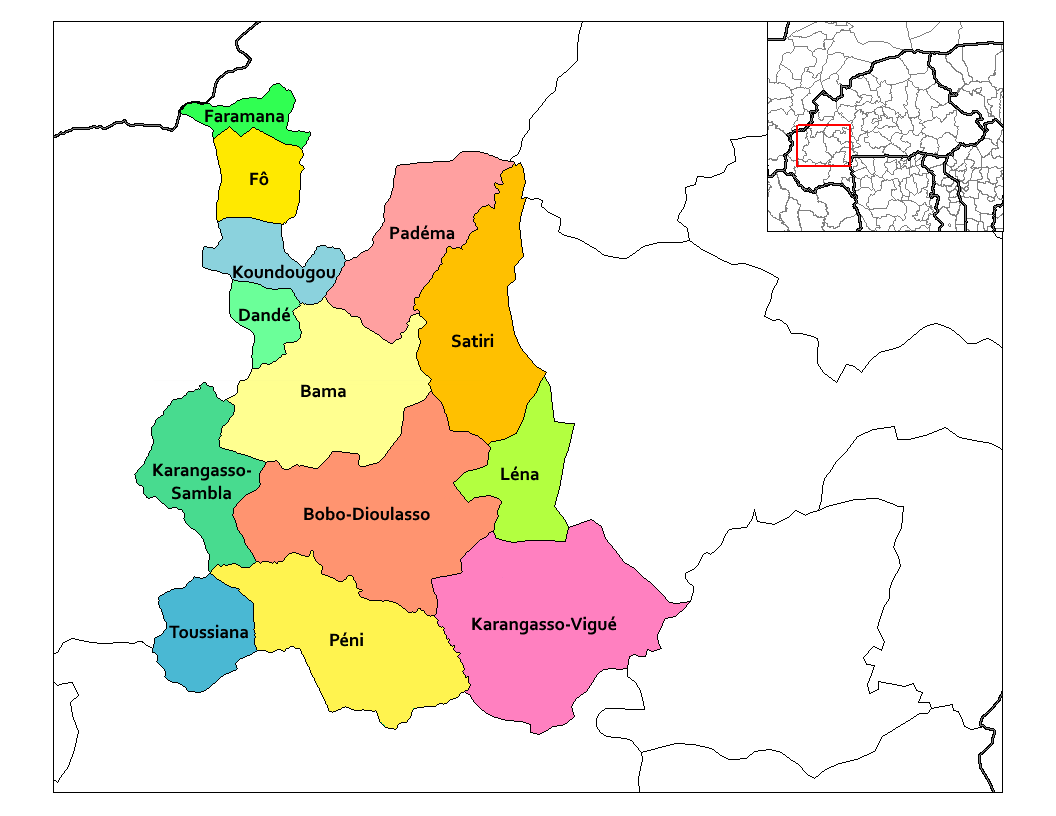
- Fo Department location in the province
- Country: Burkina Faso
- Province: Houet Province

Area
  - Total: 155.1 sq mi (401.6 km^{2})

Population (2019 census)
  - Total: 22,471
  - Density: 144.9/sq mi (55.95/km^{2})
- Time zone: UTC+0 (GMT 0)

Fo is a department or commune of Houet Province in south-western Burkina Faso. Its capital lies at the town of Fo.
