= Minister of Finance (Burkina Faso) =

Government ministry

This is a list of ministers of finance of Burkina Faso and Upper Volta since the independence of Upper Volta:

== List of ministers ==
- Rene-Blaise Bassinga, 1959-1962
- Francois Bouda, 1962-1963
- Charles Kaboré, 1963-1965
- Raphael Medah, 1965-1966
- Tiémoko Marc Garango, 1966–1976
- Mamadou Sanfo, 1976
- Léonard Kalmogo, 1976–1980
- Edmond Ky, 1980–1982
- Inoussa Maïga, 1982
- Pascal Sanou, 1982–1983
- Justin Damo Baro, 1983–1986
- Talata Eugène Dondassé, 1986–1987
- Guy Some, 1987–1988
- Bintou Sango, 1988–1991, female
- Frédéric A. Korsaga, 1991–1992
- Roch Marc Christian Kaboré, 1992–1993
- Ousmane Ouédraogo, 1993–1994
- Zéphirin Diabré, 1994–1996
- Kadré Désiré Ouédraogo, 1996–1997
- Tertius Zongo, 1997–2000
- Paramanga Ernest Yonli, 2000–2002
- Jean-Baptiste Compaoré, 2002–2008
- Lucien Marie Noel Bembamba, 2008–2014
- Jean Sanon, 2014–2016
- Rosine Sori-Coulibaly, 2016–2019
- Lassané Kaboré, 2019-2022
- Séglaro Abel Some, 2022
- Aboubacar Nacanabo 2022-Present

== See also ==
- Cabinet of Burkina Faso
- Economy of Burkina Faso
