= Aboubacar Nacanabo =

Burkinabe politician

Minister of Economy, Finance and Foresight of Burkina Faso
- Incumbent
- Assumed office 21 October 2022
- President: Ibrahim Traoré (Interim)
- Preceded by: Séglaro Abel Some

Chairperson of Cross Border Taxation
- Incumbent
- Assumed office 11 April 2022

Commissioner of the Government of Burkina Faso
- Incumbent
- Assumed office 11 May 2022

African Tax Administration Forum (ATAF)
- In office 10 August 2021 – 12 Aug 2022

Commissioner of the Government of Burkina Faso
- Incumbent
- Assumed office 11 May 2022

President du Réseau Africain des Experts en Fiscalité Internationale (REAFI)
- Incumbent
- Assumed office 5 July 2020

Personal details
- Born: 13 October 1979 (age 46) Abidjan
- Party: People's Movement for Progress

Aboubacar Nacanabo is a Burkinabe politician, educator and businessman. He is the current Minister of Economy, Finance and Foresight in Burkina Faso, having been appointed to the position in 2022 by the current interim president of Burkina Faso, Ibrahim Traoré. His term began on 21 October 2022.

== Background ==
=== Early life ===
Nacanabo was born on 13 October 1979 in Abidjan. He attended his primary and secondary school in Abidjan where he obtained his bachelor's degree before returning to Burkina Faso to continue his studies in Economics at the Josep-Ki Zerbo University. In 2022, he was an international tax expert and manager of the rapid response service- African tax administration forum. He also served as a Commissioner of the Government of Burkina Faso to the National Order of Chartered Accountants under the Ministry of Economy, Finance and Development. He holds a PhD in Taxation of the Digitalised Economy from Académiee sciences de management Paris located in France.

== Leadership ==
=== 2021:The Cross Border Taxation (CBT) ===
On 11 August 2021, Nacanabo was elected as a chairperson of the organisation The Cross Border Taxation (CBT), whereas Mercy Mbithi from Kenya was appointed as the deputy. The election was held virtually and took place on the 25th meeting of the organisation's technical meeting on 5 August 2021. The organisation was found in 2014 and it is available in 10 countries. Nacanabo as the head of the Tax Audit Unit in the Large Tax Office of the Direction Générale des Imports du Burkina Faso, joined the CBT back in 2014. The aim of the organisation is to provide its members technical analysis of standard-setting processes and to settle inputs from members on the direction the Secretariat should follow .He is claimed to be fluent in English and French. Nacanabo's other work in the CBT is to provide technical design input to the Pillar One and Pillar Two Proposals, including the United Nations Article 12B as well as supporting technical assistance in ATAF country members.

=== 2022: Minister of Economy, Finance and Foresight in Burkina Faso ===
In 2022, Nacanabo was appointed to the position by the current interim president of Burkina Faso, Ibrahim Traoré following the coup d'état by Ibrahim Traoré on 30 September. He took office on 27 October. In Rome on 14 February 2023, Nacanabo met with Director-General of the United Nations agency, QU Dongyu, and Dénis Ouédraogo, Minister for Agriculture, Animal and Fisheries Resources to honor Burkina Faso’s appreciation for FAO’s support to the country. The ministers shared with the Director-General about the country’s plans to support an increase of production under the National Development Policy. They also came up with ideas to foster the need to boost and enhance investment in agrifood systems transformation and rural development. The Director-General showed his willingness to support Burkina Faso in agrifood systems transformation and underlined South-South and Triangular Cooperation (SSTC) as a key avenue where agrifood industries and value chains can be developed and supported. The Director-General also pointed out three key components where Burkina Faso’s agrifood systems should also focus including processing of food and improving of agricultural infrastructures.

They also agreed on the need for commitment on the development of smallholder farmers and farmer field schools as well as elaborating on the importance of promoting products to promote jobs for youth and women.

Awards and achievements
| Preceded by | Minister of Economy, Finance and Foresight of Burkina Faso | Succeeded by |
