= Faramana (department) =

- Department
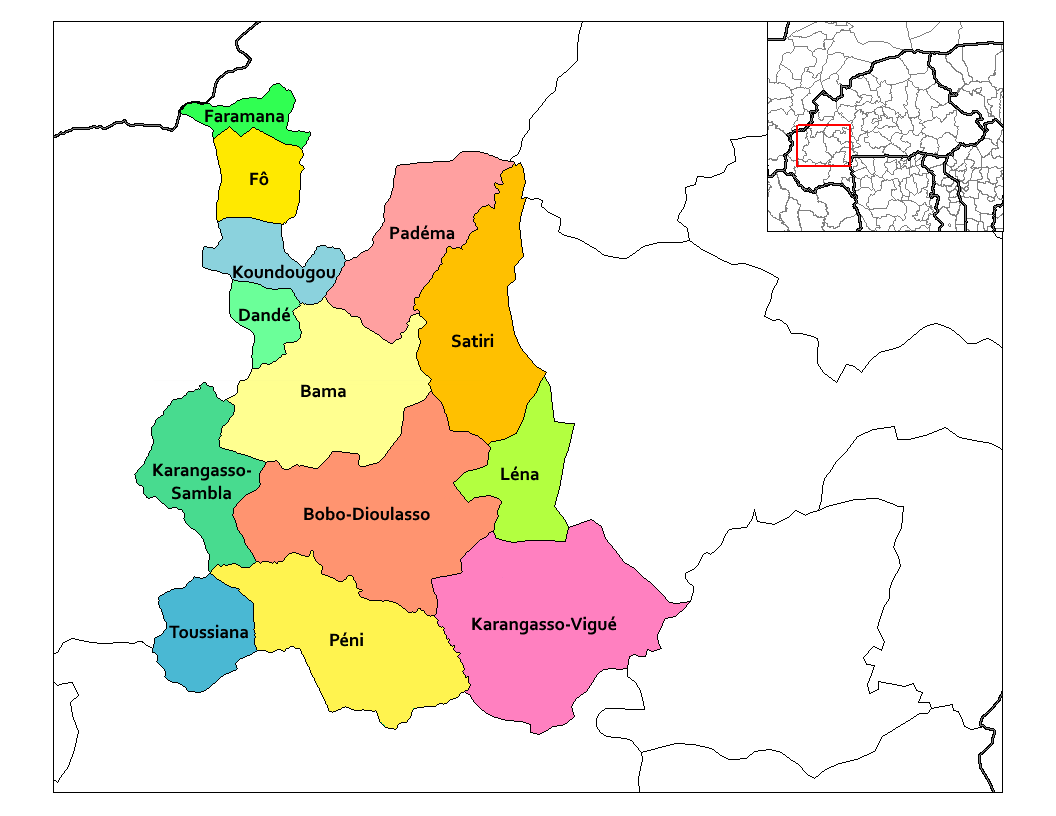
- Faramana Department location in the province
- Country: Burkina Faso
- Region: Hauts-Bassins Region
- Province: Houet Province

Population (2012)
  - Total: 16,639
- Time zone: UTC+0 (GMT 0)

Faramana is a department or commune of Houet Province in Burkina Faso.

== Cities ==
The department consists of a chief town :

- Faramana

and 7 villages:

- Bambe
- Although a
- Koakourima
- Kobi
- Kouni
- Siankoro
- Ty.
