= Zéphirin Diabré =

Burkinabé businessperson and politician

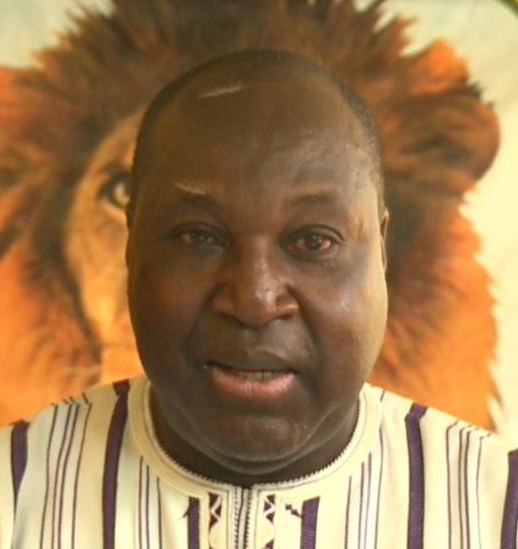

President of the Economic and Social Council
- In office 1996–1997

Minister of Economics and Finance
- In office 1994–1996
- Preceded by: Ousmane Ouédraogo
- Succeeded by: Kadré Désiré Ouédraogo

Minister of Trade, Industry and Mines
- In office 1992–1994

Personal details
- Born: 26 August 1959 (age 65); Ouagadougou, Upper Volta
- Political party: ODP–MT, UPC

Zéphirin Diabré (born 26 August 1959) is a Burkinabé politician. He served in the Government of Burkina Faso as Minister of Finance from 1994 to 1996.

== Biography ==
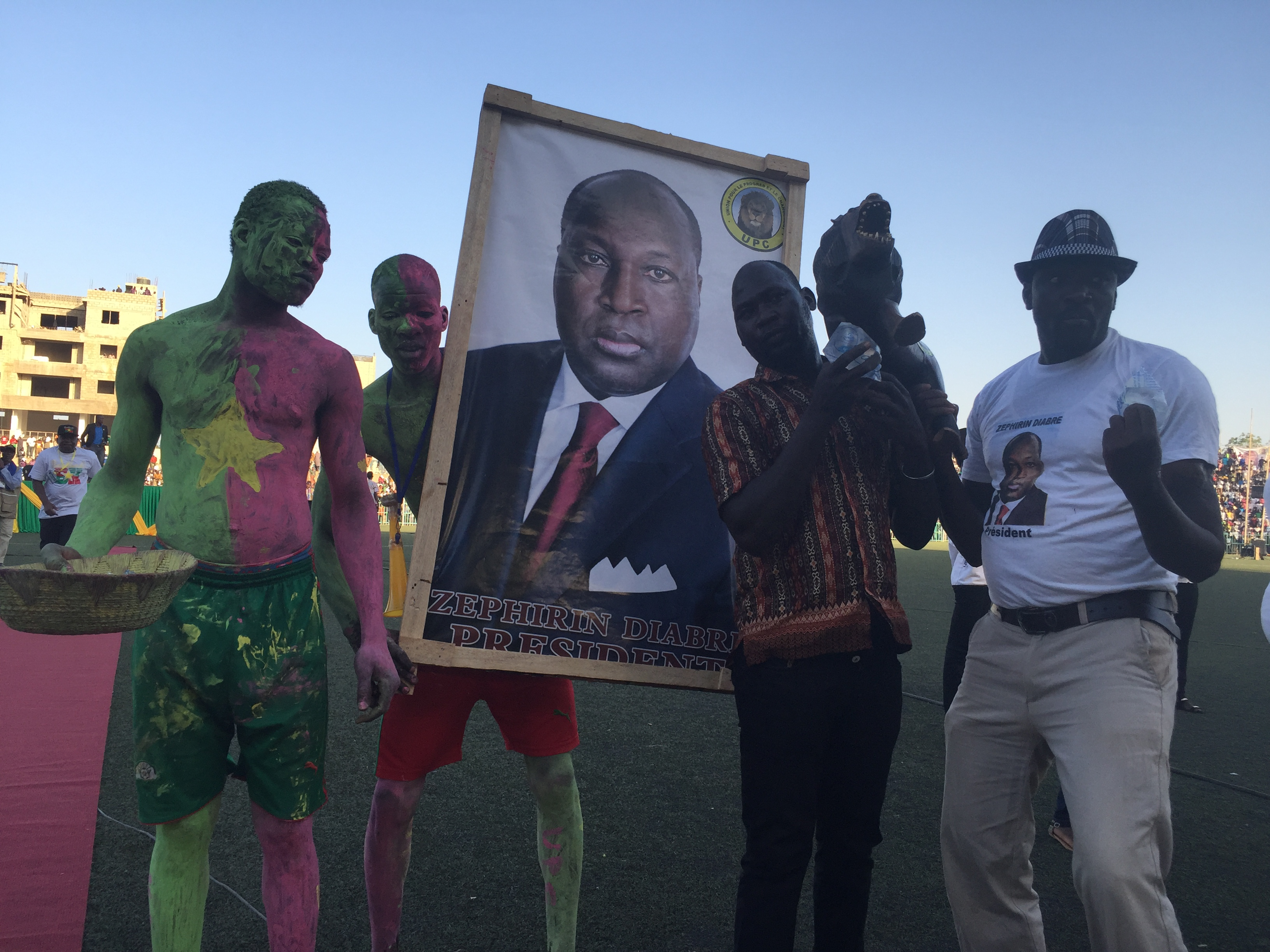
Supporters of Zéphirin Diabré in Ouagadougou, November 2015.

Diabré is an economist by training and holds a doctorate in management sciences from the Faculty of Economics and Management (BEM Management School) of Bordeaux, France. He joined the University of Ouagadougou in 1987 as assistant professor of management before joining the private sector between 1989 and 1992 as deputy director of Brakina.

He was elected MP in 1992 under the banner of the Organization for Popular Democracy – Labour Movement (ODP–MT), but gave up his seat to his deputy to become Minister of Trade, Industry and Mines the same year. He remained in the post until becoming Minister of Economics and Finance in 1994. Between 1996 and 1997 he served as President of the Economic and Social Council.

He later left the Congress for Democracy and Progress (created as a result of the merger of the ODP–MT and other parties) following policy disagreement. He became a researcher at the American Harvard University, then Associate Administrator of the United Nations Development Programme and then Africa and Middle East director of the AREVA group.

On 1 March 2010, he was one of the founding members the Union for Progress and Reform (UPC), an opposition political party that advocates democratic change and "real change" in Burkina Faso. He was the UPC candidate in the November 2015 presidential election, placing second behind Roch Marc Christian Kaboré.

On July 25, 2020, Zéphirin Diabré, was invested in Ouagadougou by his party, the Union for Progress and Change (UPC), presidential candidate in November 2020.
