= Satiri Department =

Coordinates: 11°26′05″N 4°02′16″W

- Department
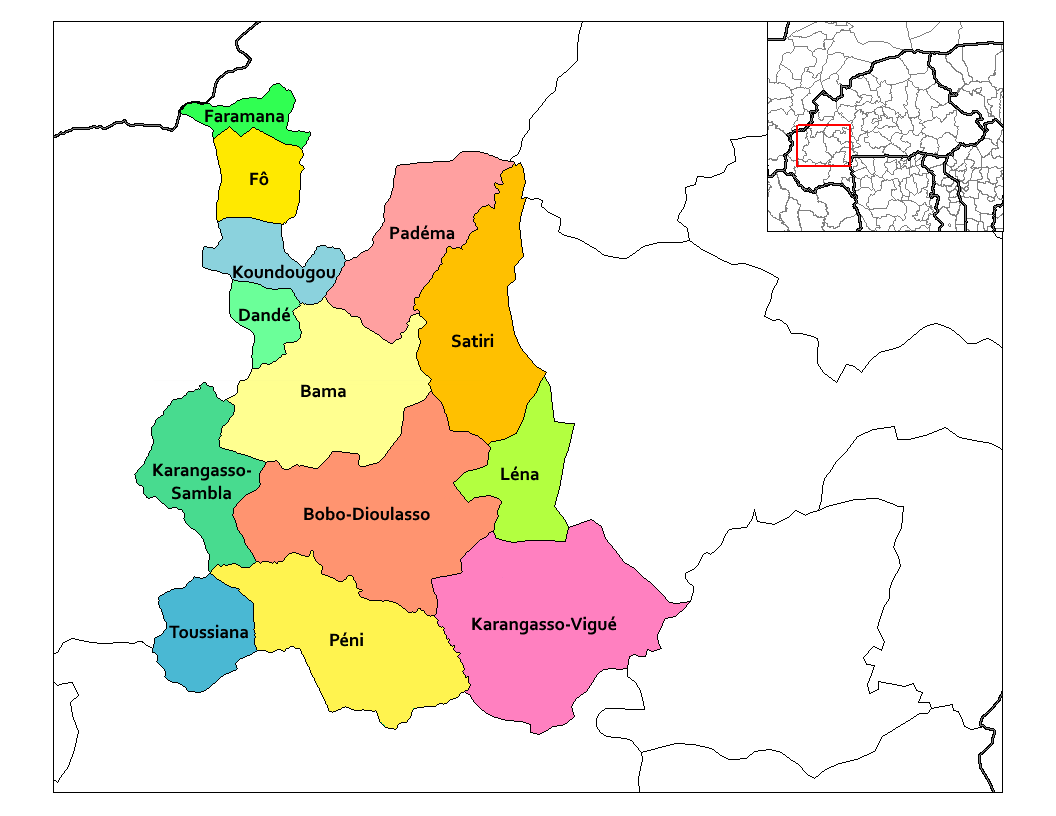
- Satiri Department location in the province
- Country: Burkina Faso
- Province: Houet Province

Area
  - Total: 473 sq mi (1,225 km^{2})

Population (2019 census)
  - Total: 48,111
  - Density: 101.7/sq mi (39.27/km^{2})
- Time zone: UTC+0 (GMT 0)

Satiri is a department or commune of Houet Province in south-western Burkina Faso. Its capital lies at the town of Satiri.

== Towns and villages ==
The department is composed of the administrative village of Satiri and fifteen other villages:

- Balla
- Bossora
- Dorossiamasso
- Fina
- Kadoumba
- Koroma
- Mogobasso
- Molokadoum
- Nefrelaye
- Ramatoulaye
- Sala
- Sissa
- Sokourany
- Tiarako
- Werou
