= Bintou Sango =

Burkina Faso politician

Minister of Finance
- In office 1988–1991
- Preceded by: Guy Some
- Succeeded by: Frédéric A. Korsaga

Personal details
- Occupation: politician

Bintou Sango is a Burkina Faso former politician. She was the country's first female Minister of Finance and served from 1988 to 1991.

== See also ==
- List of female finance ministers
