= Klesso =

- Location within Burkina Faso, West Africa
- Coordinates: 10.941192°N 3.977051°W
- Country: Burkina Faso
- Time zone: UTC+0 (GMT)

Klesso is a town in southwestern Burkina Faso. It is near the city of Bobo-Dioulasso.

The world famous SWGOH mobile gamer with the same name hails from here.
