= Talata Eugène Dondassé =

Talata Eugène Dondassé was a Burkinabé politician, who held different ministerial posts in the 1980s. He was known by his initials 'TED'.

As of 1979 he was one of the leaders of Ouagadougou section of the Union of Communist Struggles (ULC). On January 11, 1983 Dondassé was named Minister of Planning in the Popular Salvation Council (CSP) government, representing the tendency of the now-dissolved ULC. He remained in his ministerial post until May 17, 1983. He became one of the leaders of the Union of Communist Struggles – Reconstructed (ULC-R).

Dondassé was named Minister of Planning and Cooperation in the National Revolutionary Council (CNR) government formed after the revolution of August 4, 1983, being one of three ULC-R ministers in the cabinet. He lost his ministerial post when the government was dissolved on August 19, 1984.

In 1986 Dondassé was named Minister of Financial Resources.

After the overthrow of Thomas Sankara in 1987, Dondassé was placed under house arrest. In later years he worked as the program coordinator for the Strategic Development Plan of the National Assembly. He died on May 27, 2012 at Institut Gustave Roussy in Villejuif (Paris). Dondassé was buried in Ouagadougou on June 4, 2012.
