= Union for Progress and Reform =

Political party in Burkina Faso

Union for Progress and Reform Union pour le Progrès et le Changement
- Leader: Zéphirin Diabré
- Founded: 2010
- Dissolved: 29 January 2026
- Ideology: Big tent Liberal democracy
- Political position: Centre
- Continental affiliation: Africa Liberal Network
- International affiliation: Liberal International (Observer)

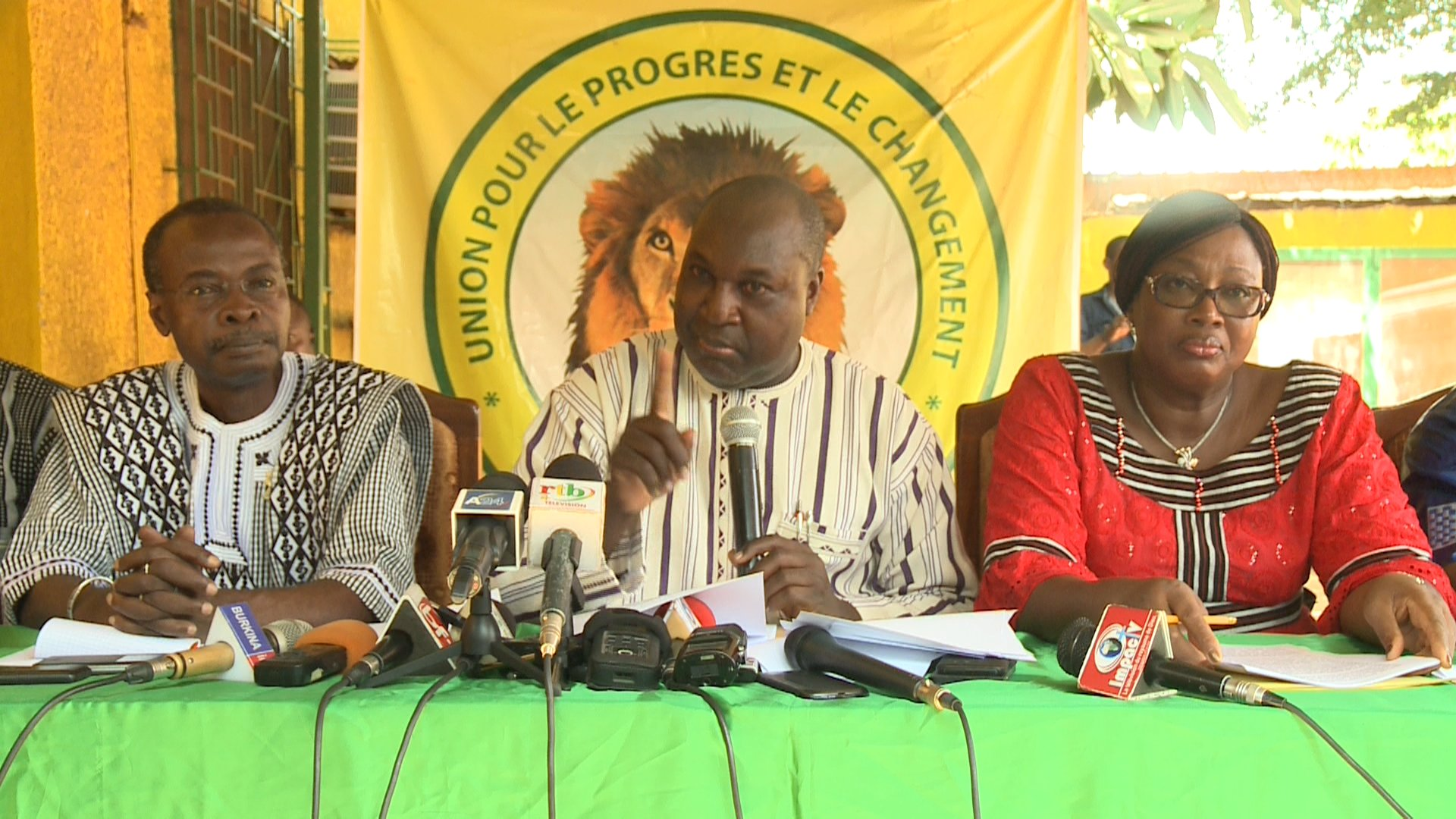
Zéphirin Diabré and other UPC members in Ouagadougou in October 2017

The Union for Progress and Reform (French: Union pour le Progrès et le Changement, UPC) was a political party in Burkina Faso. The party described itself as non-ideological.

== History ==
The UPC was established by Zéphirin Diabré in 2010 after he left the ruling Congress for Democracy and Progress (CDP). It finished third in the popular vote in the 2012 parliamentary elections with 11%, winning 19 of the 127 seats in the National Assembly, becoming the second-largest party after the CDP. In the 2015 general elections it received 21% of the vote, winning 33 seats. Its presidential candidate Zéphirin Diabré finished second with 30% of the vote.

All political parties in Burkina Faso were dissolved through decree by the junta on 29 January 2026.
