= Toussiana Department =

Coordinates: 10°50′07″N 4°37′14″W

Toussiana
- Department
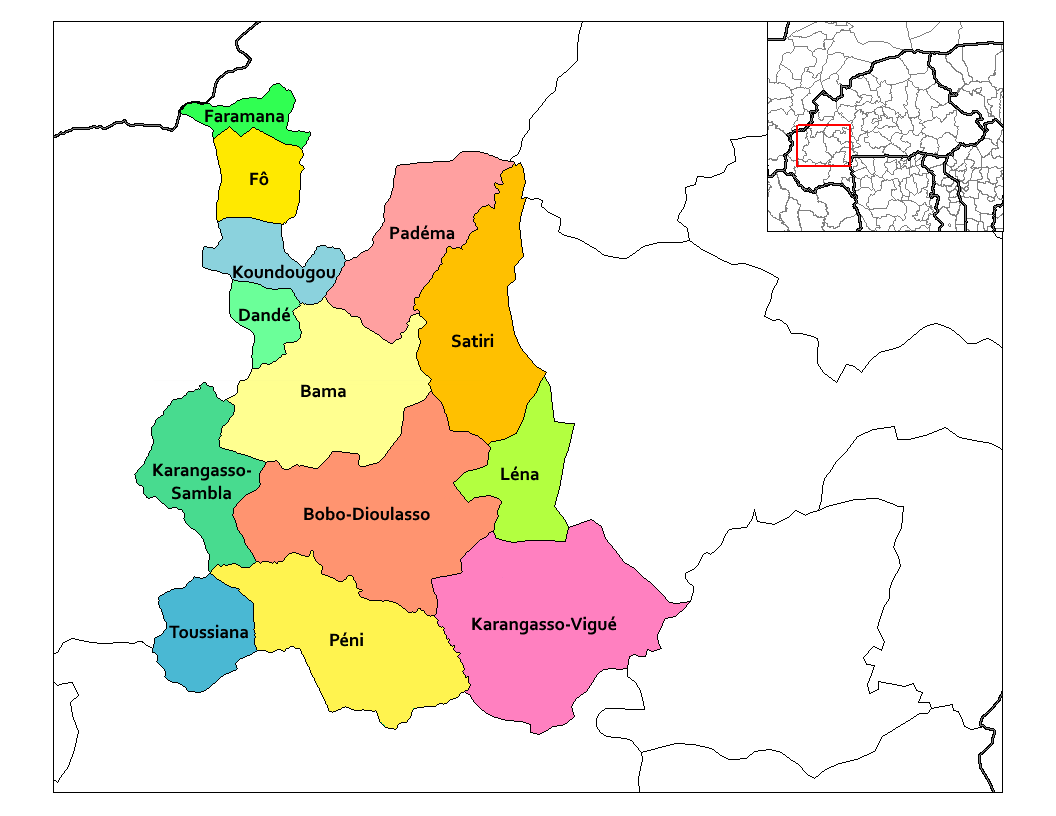
- Toussiana Department location in the province
- Country: Burkina Faso
- Province: Houet Province

Area
  - Total: 189.6 sq mi (491.0 km^{2})

Population (2019 census)
  - Total: 21,578
  - Density: 113.8/sq mi (43.95/km^{2})
- Time zone: UTC+0 (GMT 0)

Toussiana is a department or commune of Houet Province in south-western Burkina Faso. Its capital lies at the town of Toussiana.
