= Péni Department =

Péni
- Department
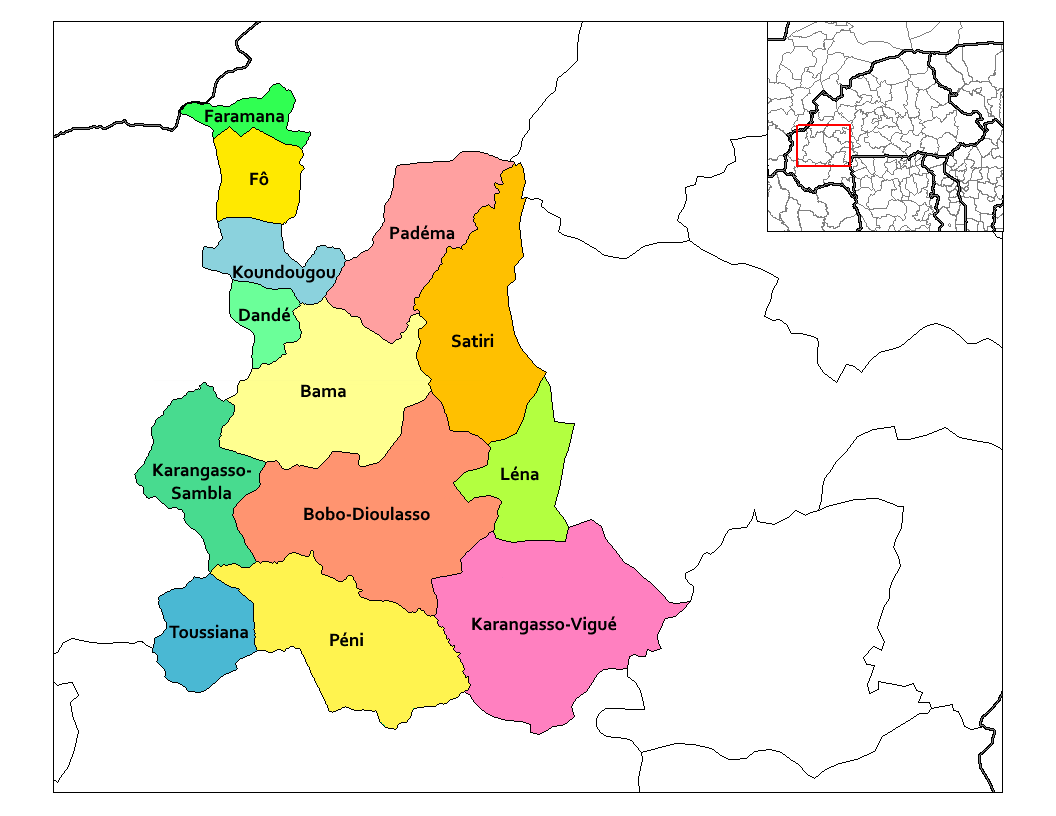
- Peni Department location in the province
- Coordinates: 10.9500°N 4.4833°W
- Country: Burkina Faso
- Province: Houet Province

Area
  - Total: 491 sq mi (1,272 km^{2})

Population (2019 census)
  - Total: 51,212
  - Density: 104.3/sq mi (40.26/km^{2})
- Time zone: UTC+0 (GMT 0)

Péni is a department or commune of Houet Province in south-western Burkina Faso. Its capital lies at the town of Péni.

== Towns and villages ==
The department is composed by the seat, the town of Péni, and 23 villages: Dabokiri, Dissini, Dodougou, Dogossesso, Donfara, Dounousso, Finlande, Gnafongo, Kodara, Koumandara, Lanfiera, Marabagasso, Me, Moussobadougou, Nakaka, Nongondougou, Noumoudara, Samaradougou, Sokourani, Taga, Tapokadeni, Tien and Tiemeredji-Gouegoue.
