= Houet Province =

Coordinates: 11°20′N 4°15′W

Houet
- Province
- Location in Burkina Faso

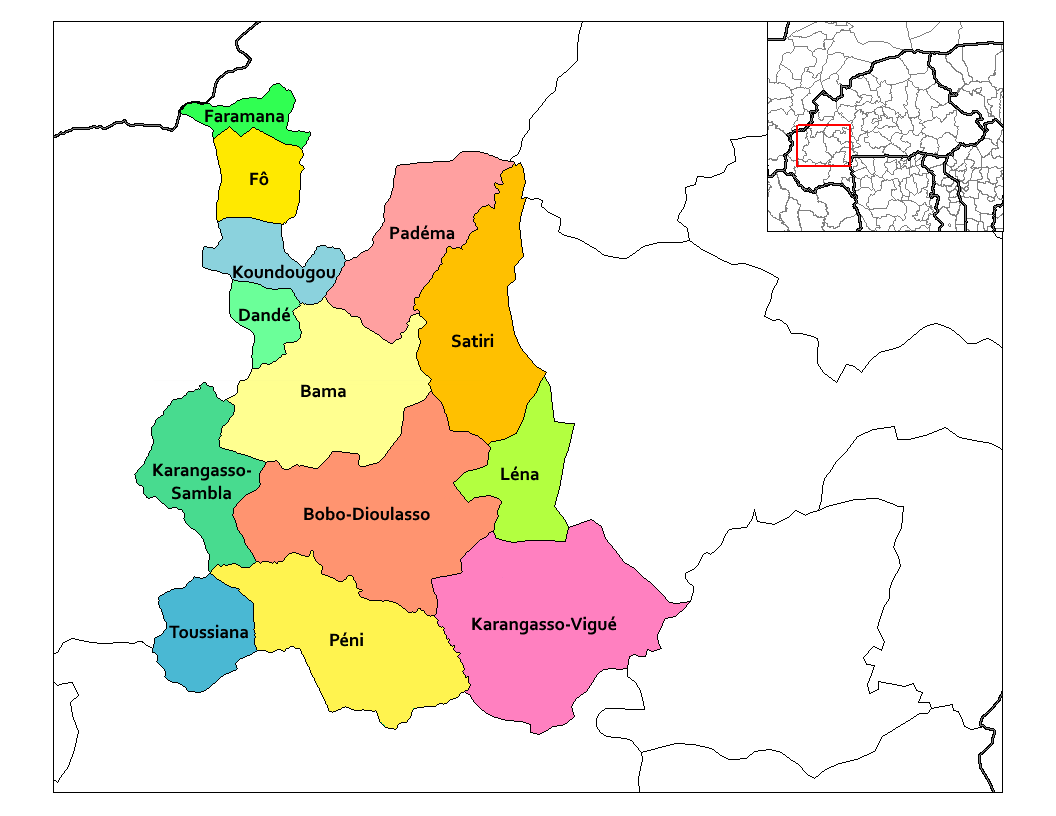
- Provincial map of its departments
- Country: Burkina Faso
- Region: Hauts-Bassins
- Capital: Bobo-Dioulasso

Area
  - Province: 11,571 km^{2} (4,468 sq mi)

Population (2019 census)
  - Province: 1,509,377
  - Density: 130.44/km^{2} (337.85/sq mi)
  - Urban: 904,920
- Time zone: UTC+0 (GMT 0)
- ISO 3166 code: BF-HOU

Houet is one of the 45 provinces of Burkina Faso, located in its Hauts-Bassins Region. The capital of Houet is Bobo-Dioulasso. In 2019, the province had a population of 1,509,377.

== Departments ==
Houet is divided into 13 departments (one of them, Bobo-Dioulasso is further subdivided in arrondissements) :

The Departments of Houet
Commune	Capital	Population Census 2006)
Dandé Department	Dandé	21,310
Bama Department	Bama	69,631
Faramana Department	Faramana	16,734
Fô Department	Fô	19,199
Karangasso-Sambla Department	Karankasso-Sambla	25,598
Karangasso-Vigué Department	Karankasso-Vigué	76,570
Koundougou Department	Koundougou	17,041
Léna Department	Léna	18,106
Padéma Department	Padéma	50,957
Péni Department	Péni	35,430
Satiri Department	Satiri	37,369
Toussiana Department	Toussiana	17,255
Bobo-Dioulasso Department	Bobo-Dioulasso	
● Bobo-Dioulasso (Rural)		61,919
● Dafra (Arrondissement)		175,903
● Dô (Arrondissement)		153,790
● Konsa (Arrondissement)		105,850

== See also ==
- Regions of Burkina Faso
- Provinces of Burkina Faso
- Departments of Burkina Faso
