= Orodara =

- Location within Burkina Faso
- Coordinates: 10.98°N 4.91°W
- Country: Burkina Faso
- Province: Kénédougou
- Elevation: 543 m (1,781 ft)

Population (2019 census)
  - Total: 33,422
- Time zone: UTC+0 (GMT)
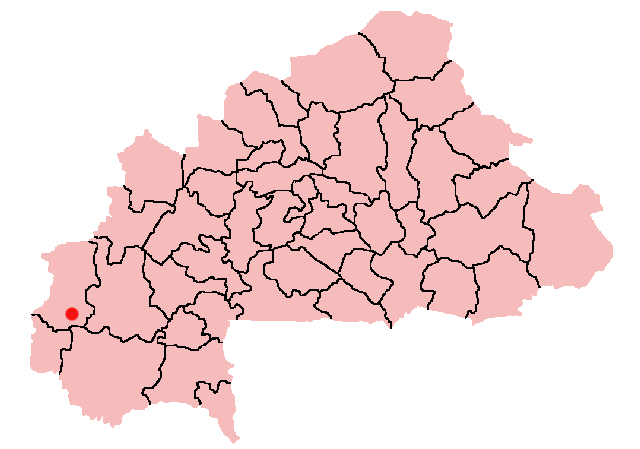
- Location of Orodara in Burkina Faso

Orodara is a town and the capital of the province of Kénédougou in Burkina Faso.

== General ==
Orodara is the capital of Kénédougou Province. It is also the capital city for the ethnic group known as the Siamou that live in the surrounding area. The most common family names of those in the Siamou ethnic group are Barro, Diarra, Traore, and Sanou. It is a small ethnic group with only about five thousand people speaking the Siamou language. The city is located on National Route 8 of Burkina Faso, and has a population of approximately 10,000 (2006). The city has a district hospital, a large market, a cinema, post office, city hall, bus station, and two gas stations.

== Languages ==
A number of languages are spoken in and around the city of Orodara. These include French, Dioula/Jula, Moore, Siamou, Tousian/Toussian, Turka, and Senafo.

== Economy ==
The economy in the region around Orodara is mainly based on agriculture. Main crops include cotton, mangoes, corn, peanuts, and beans. Vegetables and other various fruits are also grown and sold in the market.
