= Guiriko Region =

Region of Burkina Faso

Guiriko Hauts-Bassins
- Region
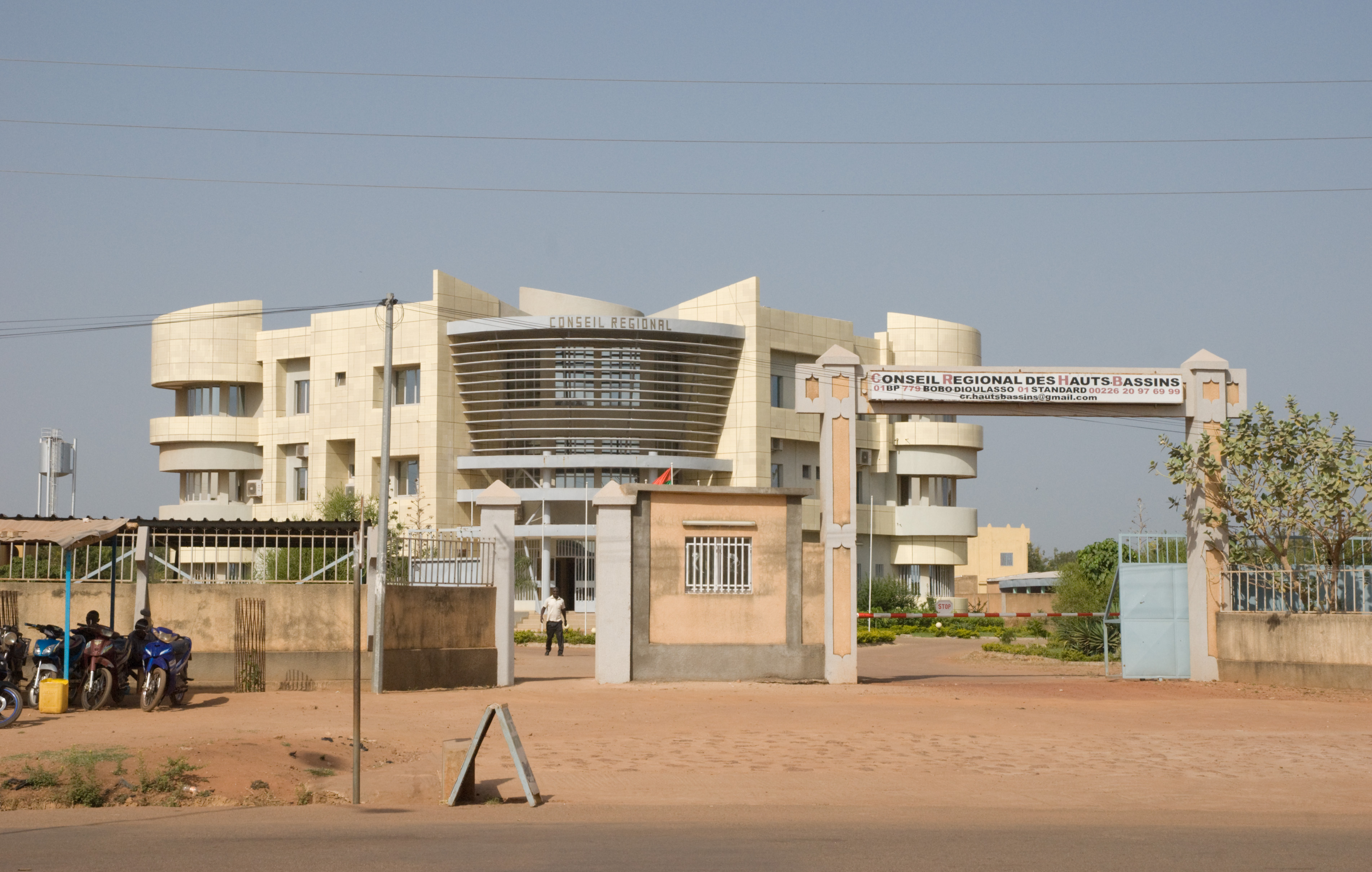
- Building housing the Hauts-Bassins Regional Council in Bobo-Dioulasso (November 2017)

- Location in Burkina Faso
- Coordinates: 11°15′N 4°30′W
- Country: Burkina Faso
- Capital: Bobo Dioulasso

Area
  - Region: 9,785 sq mi (25,343 km^{2})

Population (2019 census)
  - Region: 2,238,375
  - Density: 228.76/sq mi (88.323/km^{2})
  - Urban: 1,024,464
- Time zone: UTC+0 (GMT 0)
- HDI (2017): 0.468 low · 2nd

Guiriko, formerly known as Hauts-Bassins ([o.ba.sɛ̃], "Upper Basins"), is one of Burkina Faso's seventeen administrative regions. It was created on 2 July 2001. The region's capital is Bobo Dioulasso. Three provinces make up the region—Houet, Kénédougou, and Tuy.

As of 2019, the population of the region was 2,238,375 with 51.1% females. The population in the region was 10.92% of the total population of the country. The child mortality rate was 80, infant mortality rate was 67 and the mortality of children under five was 141. The coverage of cereal need compared to the total production of the region was 160%. As of 2007, the literacy rate in the region was 33.4%, compared to a national average of 28.3%.

== Geography ==
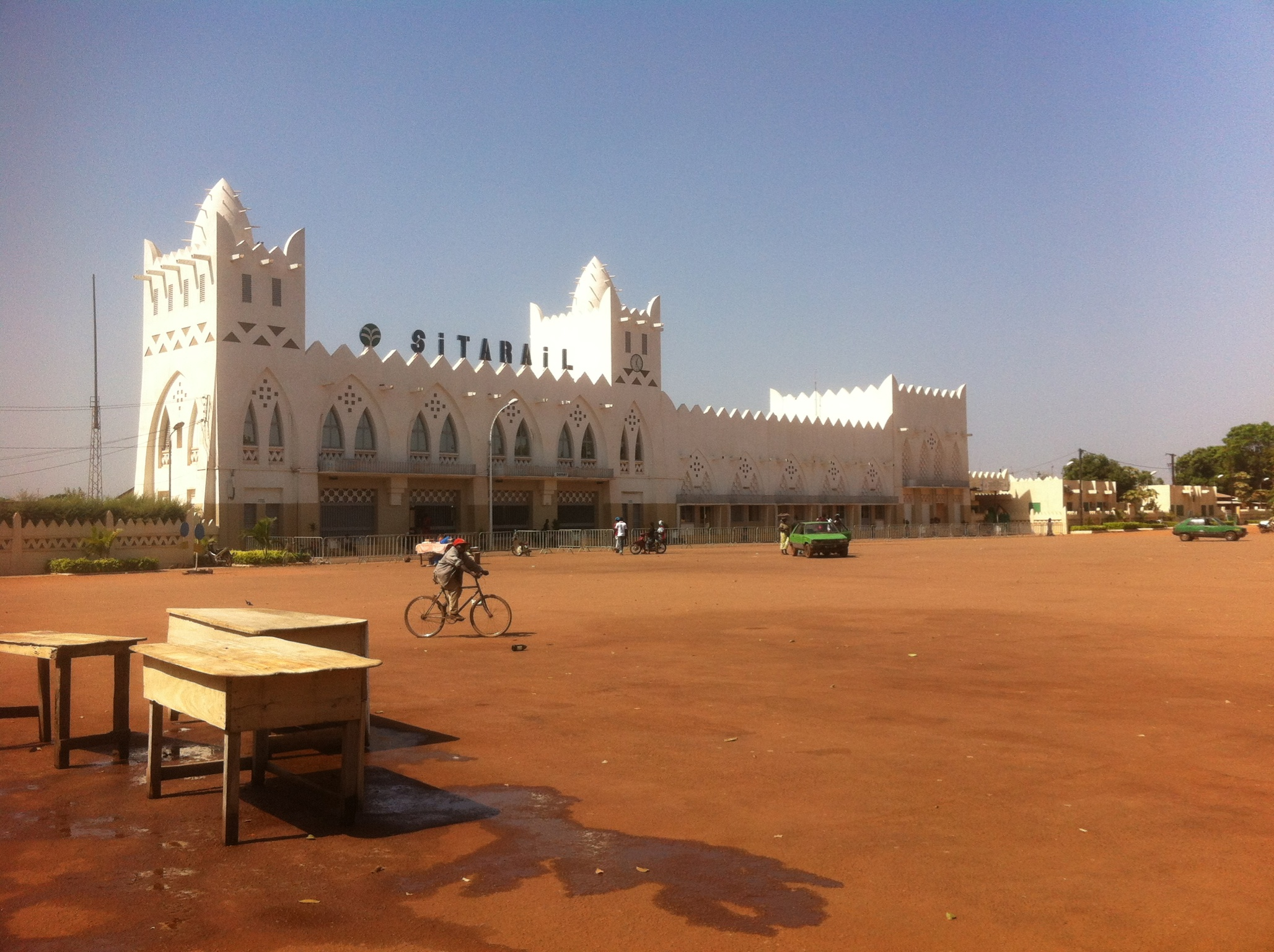
Railway station of Bobo-Dioulasso

Most of Burkina Faso is a wide plateau formed by riverine systems and is called falaise de Banfora. There are three major rivers, the Red Volta, Black Volta and White Volta, which cut through different valleys. The climate is generally hot, with unreliable rains across different seasons. Gold and quartz are common minerals found across the country, while manganese deposits are also common. The dry season is usually from October to May and rains are common during the wet season from June to September. The soil texture is porous and hence the yield is also poor. The average elevation is around 200 m (660 ft) to 300 m (980 ft) above mean sea level. Among West African countries, Burkino Faso has the largest elephant population and the country is replete with game reserves. The southern regions are more tropical in nature and have Savannah and forests. The principal river is the Black Volta, that originates in the southern region and drains into Ghana. The areas near the rivers usually have flies like tsetse and similium, which are carriers of sleep sickness and river blindness. The average rainfall in the region is around 100 cm (39 in) compared to northern regions that receive only 25 cm (9.8 in) rainfall.

== Demographics ==
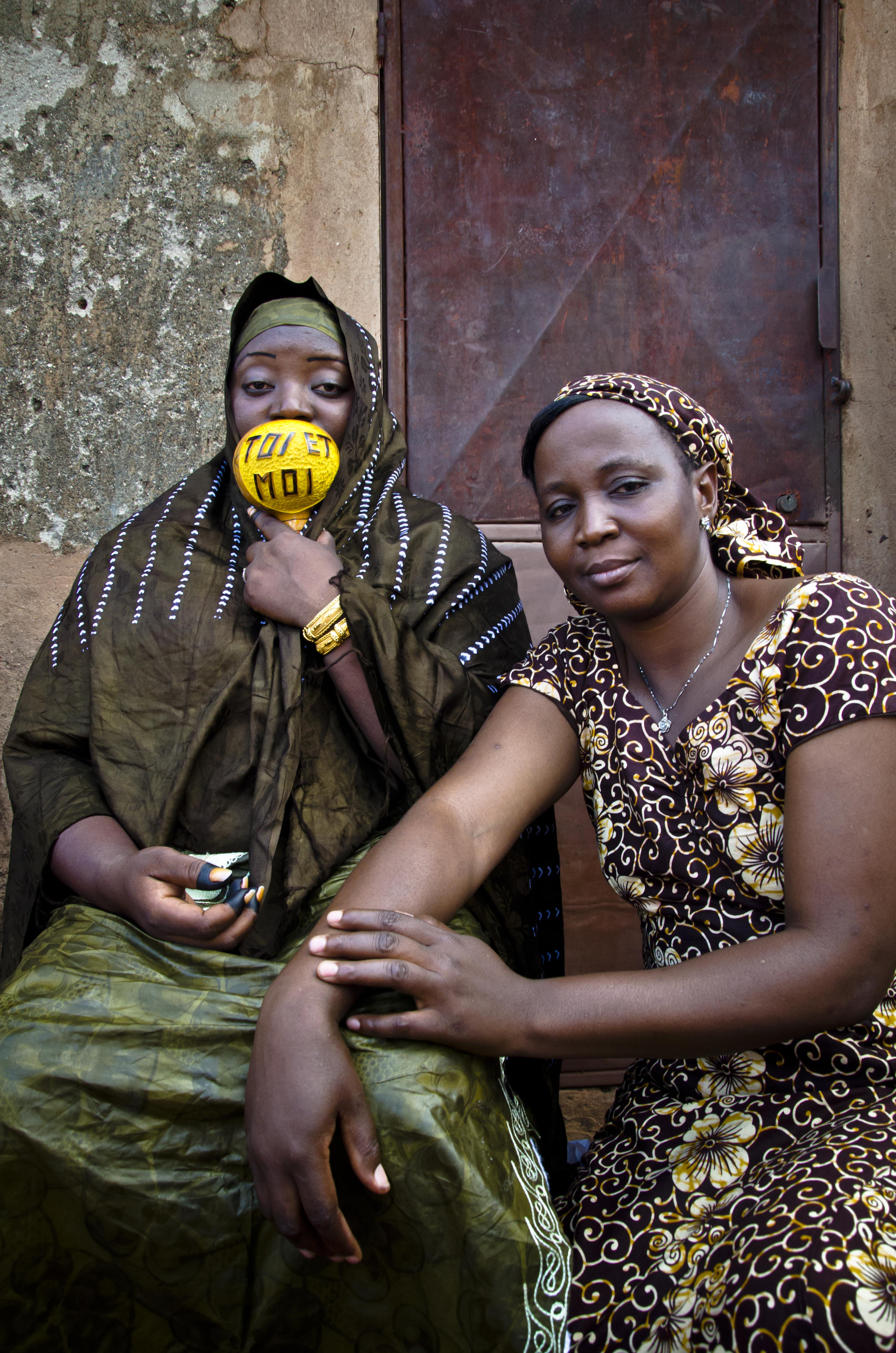
Marriage ceremony in Bobo-Dioulasso

As of 2019, the population of the region was 2,238,375 with 51.1% females. The population in the region was 10.92% of the total population of the country. The child mortality rate was 80, infant mortality rate was 67 and the mortality of children under five was 141. As of 2007, among the working population, there were 55% employees, 21.3% under employed, 20.8% inactive people, 23.7% not working and 2.9% unemployed people in the region.

Historical population
| Year | Pop. | ±% p.a. |
|---|---|---|
| 1985 | 743,836 | — |
| 1996 | 1,031,377 | +3.02% |
| 2006 | 1,469,604 | +3.60% |
| 2019 | 2,238,375 | +3.29% |

== Economy ==
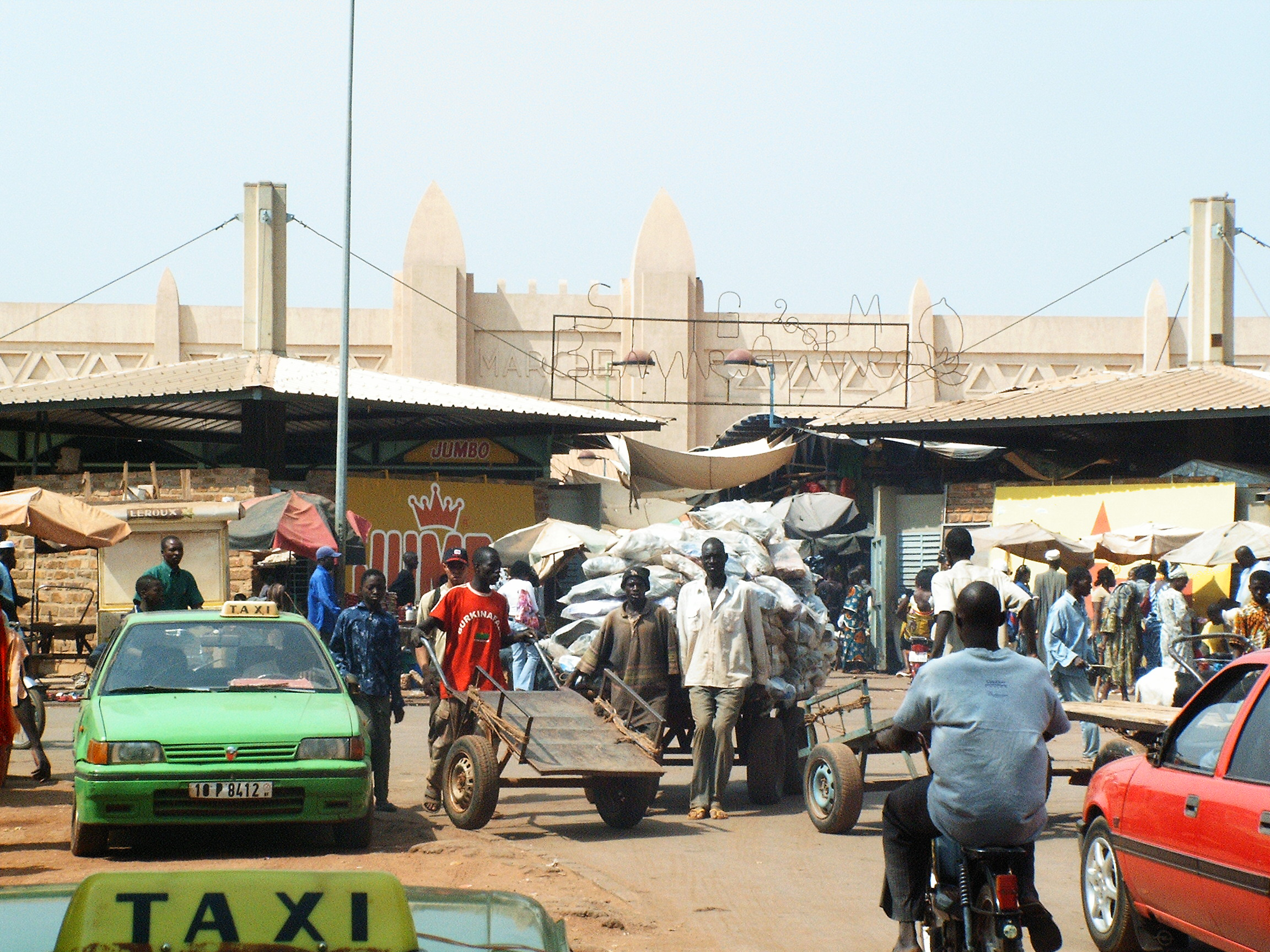
Bobo Dioulasso market

As of 2007, there were 658.4 km (409.1 mi) of highways, 570.6 km (354.6 mi) of regional roads and 287.3 km (178.5 mi) of county roads. The first set of car traffic was 438, first set of two-wheeler traffic was 9,891 and the total classified road network was 1,516. The total corn produced during 2015 was 498,177 tonnes, cotton was 359,349 tonnes, cowpea was 24,769 tonnes, groundnut was 26,292 tonnes, millet was 26,475 tonnes, rice was 71,259 tonnes and sorghum was 126,222 tonnes. The coverage of cereal need compared to the total production of the region was 160.00 per cent. As of 2007, the literacy rate in the region was 33.4 per cent, compared to a national average of 28.3 per cent. The gross primary enrolment was 80 per cent, post-primary was 35.1 per cent and gross secondary school enrolment was 16.2. There were 2289 boys and 2258 girls enrolled in the primary and post-secondary level. There were 143 teachers in primary & post-secondary level, while there were 2170 teachers in post-primary and post-secondary level.

== Administration ==
| Province | Capital | 2006 |
|---|---|---|
| Houet Province | Bobo Dioulasso | 902,662 |
| Kénédougou Province | Orodara | 283,463 |
| Tuy Province | Houndé | 224,159 |

Burkina Faso gained independence from France in 1960. It was originally called Upper Volta. There have been military coups till 1983 when Captain Thomas Sankara took control and implemented radical left wing policies. He was ousted by Blaise Compaore, who continued for 27 years till 2014, when a popular uprising ended his rule. As per Law No.40/98/AN in 1998, Burkina Faso adhered to decentralization to provide administrative and financial autonomy to local communities. There are 13 administrative regions, each governed by a Governor. The regions are subdivided into 45 provinces, which are further subdivided into 351 communes. The communes may be urban or rural and are interchangeable. There are other administrative entities like department and village. An urban commune has typically 10,000 people under it. If any commune is not able to get 75 per cent of its planned budget in revenues for 3 years, the autonomy is taken off. The communes are administered by elected Mayors. The communes are stipulated to develop economic, social and cultural values of its citizens. A commune has financial autonomy and can interact with other communes, government agencies or international entities.
