= Kénédougou Province =

Coordinates: 11°25′N 5°00′W

Kénédougou
- Province
- Location in Burkina Faso

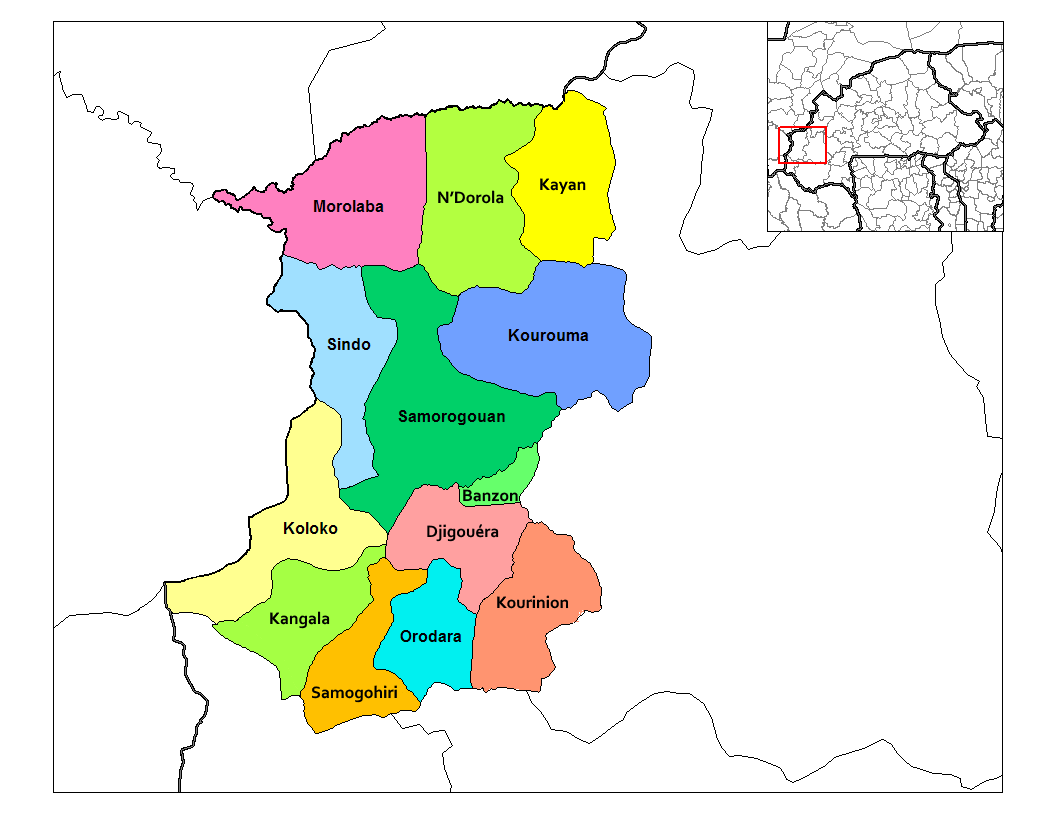
- Provincial map of its departments
- Country: Burkina Faso
- Region: Hauts-Bassins Region
- Capital: Orodara

Area
  - Province: 8,139 km^{2} (3,142 sq mi)

Population (2019 census)
  - Province: 399,836
  - Density: 49.13/km^{2} (127.2/sq mi)
  - Urban: 33,422
- Time zone: UTC+0 (GMT 0)

Kénédougou is one of the 45 provinces of Burkina Faso, located in its Hauts-Bassins Region. The 2019 census reported a population of 399,836.

Its capital is Orodara.

== Departments ==
Kenedougou is divided into 10 departments:

- Djigouera
- Koloko
- Kourignon
- Kourouma
- Morolaba
- N'dorola
- Orodara
- Samogohiri
- Samorogouan
- Sindo

== See also ==
- Regions of Burkina Faso
- Provinces of Burkina Faso
- Departments of Burkina Faso
