= Kikideni ambush =

- Part of Jihadist insurgency in Burkina Faso
- Location: Kikideni, Est Region, Burkina Faso
- Date: October 29, 2022
- Target: Burkinabe Armed Forces and VDP
- Deaths: 15: 13 Burkinabe soldiers; 2 VDP
- Injuries: 4: 3 Burkinabe soldiers; 1 VDP
- Perpetrator: Jama'at Nasr al-Islam wal Muslimin

On October 29, 2022, gunmen from Jama'at Nasr al-Islam wal Muslimin ambushed a convoy of Burkinabé soldiers near the village of Kikideni while they were on their way from Fada N'gourma to Natiaboani, Est Region, Burkina Faso.

== Background ==
The jihadist insurgency led by Ansar ul Islam and Jama'at Nasr al-Islam wal Muslimin moved to the Est Region of Burkina Faso in July 2018. While the Burkinabe military has a presence in major cities like Fada N'gourma and Natiaboani, the modus operandi of JNIM in Est Region is attacks on foreign-owned mines and attacks on Burkinabe military convoys on remote roads. Many of these convoys are aided by Volunteers for the Defense of the Homeland (VDP), civilian militias trained by the government to fight the jihadists. Kikideni had seen prior jihadist activity, with a school burned down in the town in February 2022.

On September 26, 2022, a convoy of Burkinabe soldiers, VDP, and civilians heading to the besieged city of Djibo was ambushed by JNIM, killing thirty-seven people. The Gaskinde attack was preceded by a bus bombing in Silgadji on September 5, where thirty-five soldiers and VDP were killed. Just prior to the attack in Kikideni, an ambush by JNIM against a Burkinabe military base in Djibo killed ten Burkinabe soldiers and injured fifty others.

== Ambush ==
At the time of the attack, a convoy of Burkinabe soldiers from a detachment based in Natiaboani and VDP were returning to Natiaboani from a supply mission in Fada N'gourma. JNIM militants, hiding out near the village of Kikideni, ambushed the convoy, killing thirteen soldiers and two VDP. Three soldiers and one VDP were wounded, and eleven others went missing. The Burkinabe military deployed reinforcements the area.

== Aftermath ==
The Burkinabe government led by Ibrahim Traoré expressed condolences to the families of the soldiers for the attack. JNIM conducted more attacks against Burkinabe troops in Est region in late November.
