= Gourma Province =

Gourma
- Province
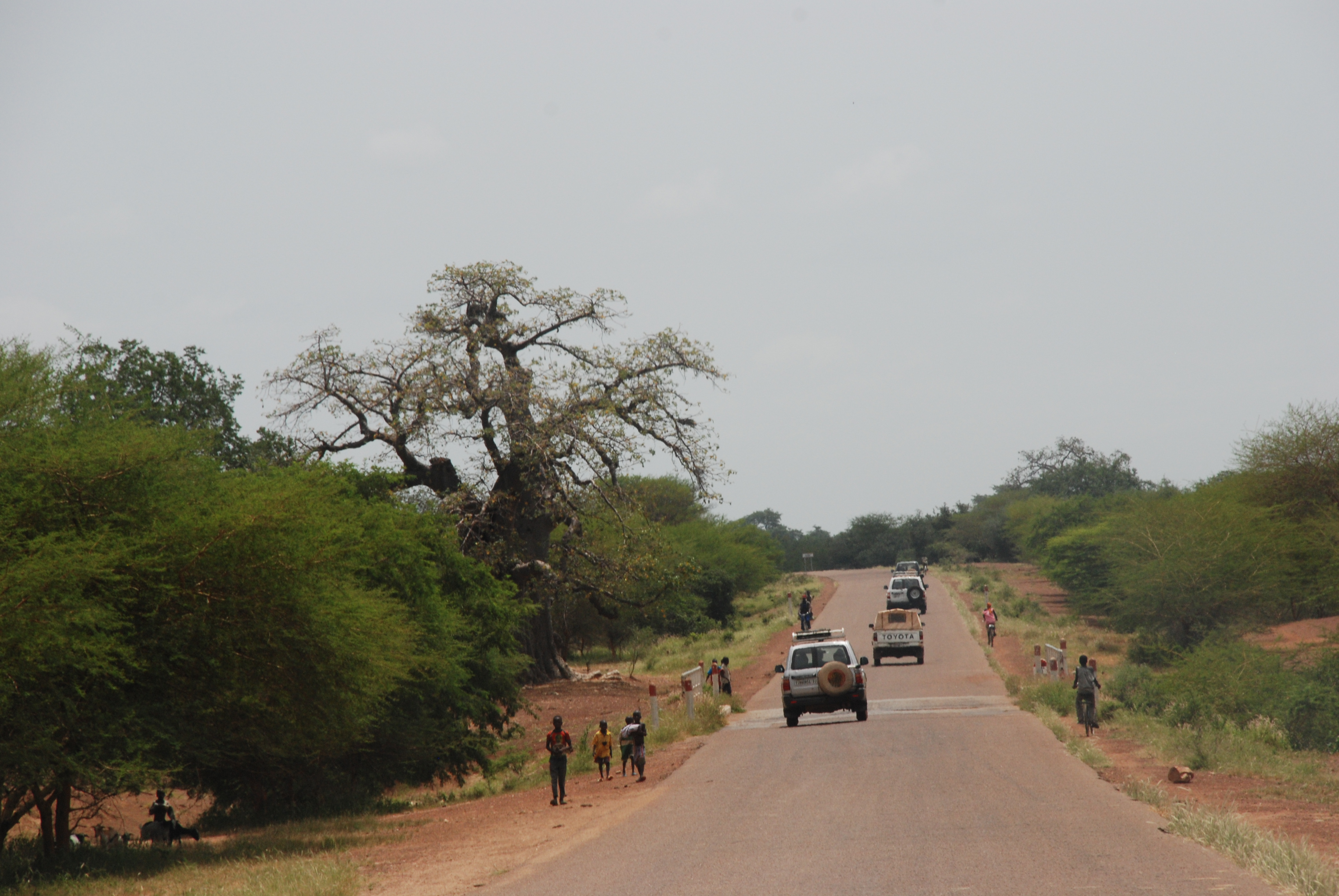
- Scenery south of Fada N’Gourma on the road to Benin

- Location in Burkina Faso

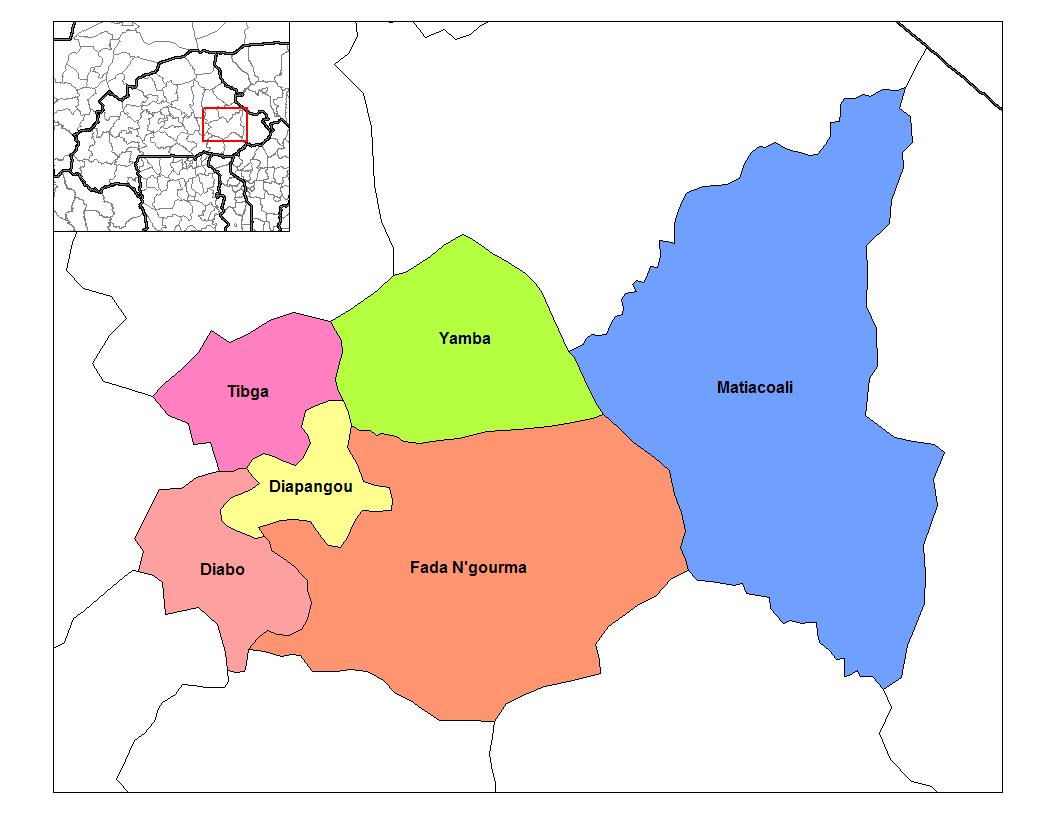
- Provincial map of its departments
- Coordinates: 12°05′N 0°30′W
- Country: Burkina Faso
- Region: Est Region
- Capital: Fada N’Gourma

Area
  - Province: 11,145 km^{2} (4,303 sq mi)

Population (2019 census)
  - Province: 437,242
  - Density: 39.232/km^{2} (101.61/sq mi)
  - Urban: 73,200
- Time zone: UTC+0 (GMT 0)

Gourma is one of the 45 provinces of Burkina Faso, in Est Region. The capital of Gourma is Fada N’Gourma. The population of Gourma was 437,242 in 2019.

== Departments ==
Gourma is divided into 6 departments:

The Departments of Gourma
Commune	Capital	Population (Census 2006)
Diabo Department	Diabo	43,357
Diapangou Department	Diapangou	26,457
Fada N’Gourma Department	Fada N’Gourma	123,594
Matiacoali Department	Matiakoali	54,574
Tibga Department	Tibga	29,100
Yamba Department	Yamba	27,087

== See also ==
- Regions of Burkina Faso
- Provinces of Burkina Faso
- Departments of Burkina Faso
- Natiaboani
- Habaza
- 2022 Natiaboani ambush
