= Kontaga =

Kontaga is the name of several settlements in Burkina Faso. It may refer to:

- Kontaga, Gounghin, a village in Kouritenga Province
- Kontaga, Tibga, a village in the Tibga Department of Gourma Province
- Kontaga-Peulh, a village in the Tibga Department of Gourma Province
