= Yamba =

Yamba may refer to:

- Yamba, New South Wales, a port town in Australia
- Yamba, South Australia, a locality in the Riverland
- Yamba Department, one of the six departments of Gourma Province, Burkina Faso
  - Yamba, Burkina Faso, a town in Yamba Department
- Yamba, Sudan, a village in Southern Sudan
- Yamba language, spoken in Cameroon
- Yamba Asha, Angolan footballer
