= 2022 Natiaboani ambush =

Ambush in Burkina Faso

- Part of the Jihadist insurgency in Burkina Faso
Date	March 20, 2022
Location	Natiaboani, Gourma Province, Burkina Faso
Result	Inconclusive: Jihadists successfully ambush Burkinabe troops; Burkinabe forces capture the area days later

Belligerents
Burkina Faso	Unknown jihadists: Jama'at Nasr al-Islam wal Muslimin (per ACLED)

Casualties and losses
13 killed 8 injured	Several "neutralized" (per Burkinabe Army)

On March 20, 2022, unknown jihadists ambushed Burkinabe soldiers in Natiaboani, Gourma Province, Burkina Faso, killing thirteen soldiers and an unknown number of jihadists.

== Prelude ==
Much of Burkina Faso's Gourma Province has been embroiled in a jihadist insurgency since 2015, with the Burkinabe government fighting against three main groups; Jama'at Nasr al-Islam wal Muslimin, Ansar ul Islam, and the Islamic State in the Greater Sahara. The town of Natiaboani is located sixty kilometers away from the regional capital of Fada N'gourma, and as a consequence, is often targeted by jihadist groups due to a lack of security and connection to the rest of the country. On March 13, a jihadist ambush killed thirteen pro-government Volunteers for the Defense of the Homeland militiamen in northern Burkina Faso, near the towns of Tabarko and Tougouri. Fifteen young people were also kidnapped in an attack by unknown armed men in Nagré on March 18.

== Ambush ==
At the time of the attack, several Burkinabe soldiers were out on a patrol near Natiaboani. A press release by the Burkinabe government stated that thirteen soldiers were killed and eight were injured, along with an unknown number of jihadists. These tolls were corroborated by local sources speaking to AFP, claiming that several jihadists were killed. In response to the attacks, the Burkinabe government launched air campaigns to regain control of the area.

Later, ACLED attributed the attack to Jama'at Nasr al-Islam wal Muslimin (JNIM), due to their involvement with other attacks in the area at the time.

== Also see ==
- Natiaboani
- Habaza
