= Matiacoali Department =

Coordinates: 12°21′13.51″N 1°01′50.05″E

Matiacoali
- Department
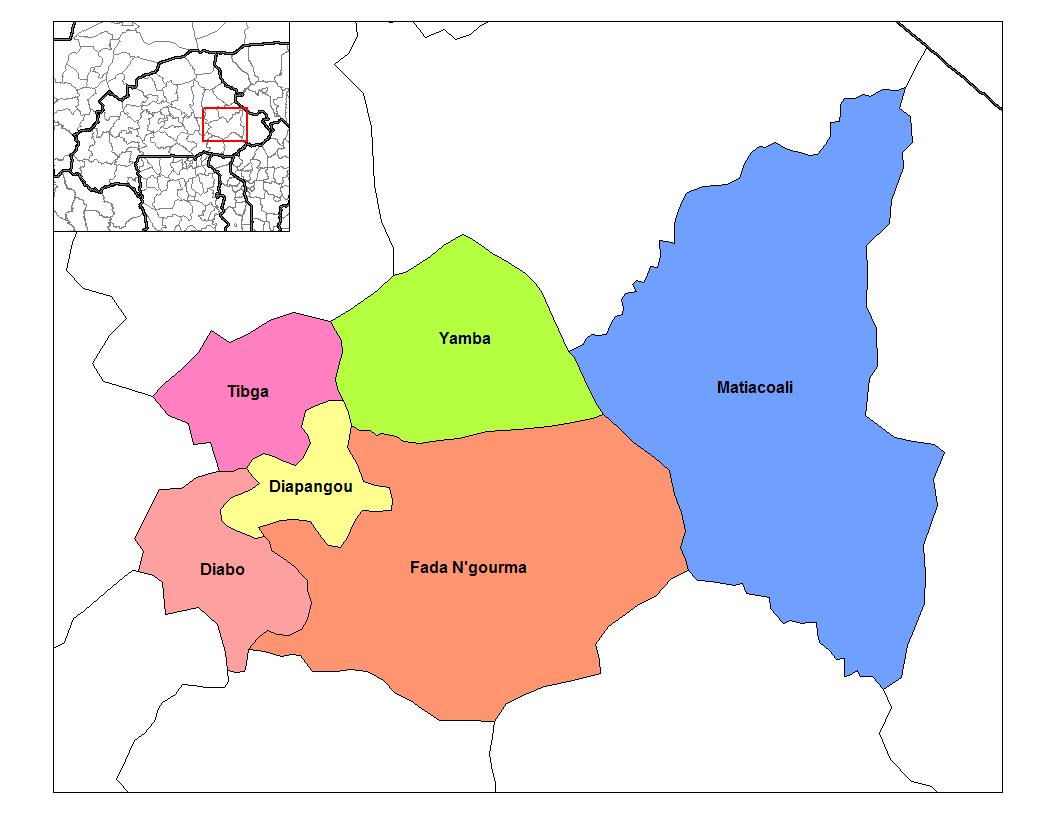
- Matiacoali Department location in the province
- Country: Burkina Faso
- Province: Gourma Province

Area
  - Total: 1,714 sq mi (4,438 km^{2})

Population (2019 census)
  - Total: 74,662
  - Density: 43.57/sq mi (16.82/km^{2})
- Time zone: UTC+0 (GMT 0)

Matiacoali is a department or commune of Gourma Province in north-eastern Burkina Faso. Its capital lies at the town of Matiacoali.
