= Natiaboani =

Town in Est, Burkina Faso

- Location in Burkina Faso
- Coordinates: 11°42′11″N 0°30′17″E
- Country: Burkina Faso
- Region: Est Region
- Province: Gourma Province
- Department: Fada N'Gourma Department

Population (2019 (est))
  - Total: 16,640

Natiaboani is a populated place located in the Fada N'Gourma Department, Gourma Province, Est Region in Burkina Faso.

It was the site of a 2022 Islamist attack, known as the 2022 Natiaboani ambush.

== See also ==
- 2022 Natiaboani ambush
