= Diapangou Department =

Coordinates: 12°07′N 0°11′E

Diapangou
- Department
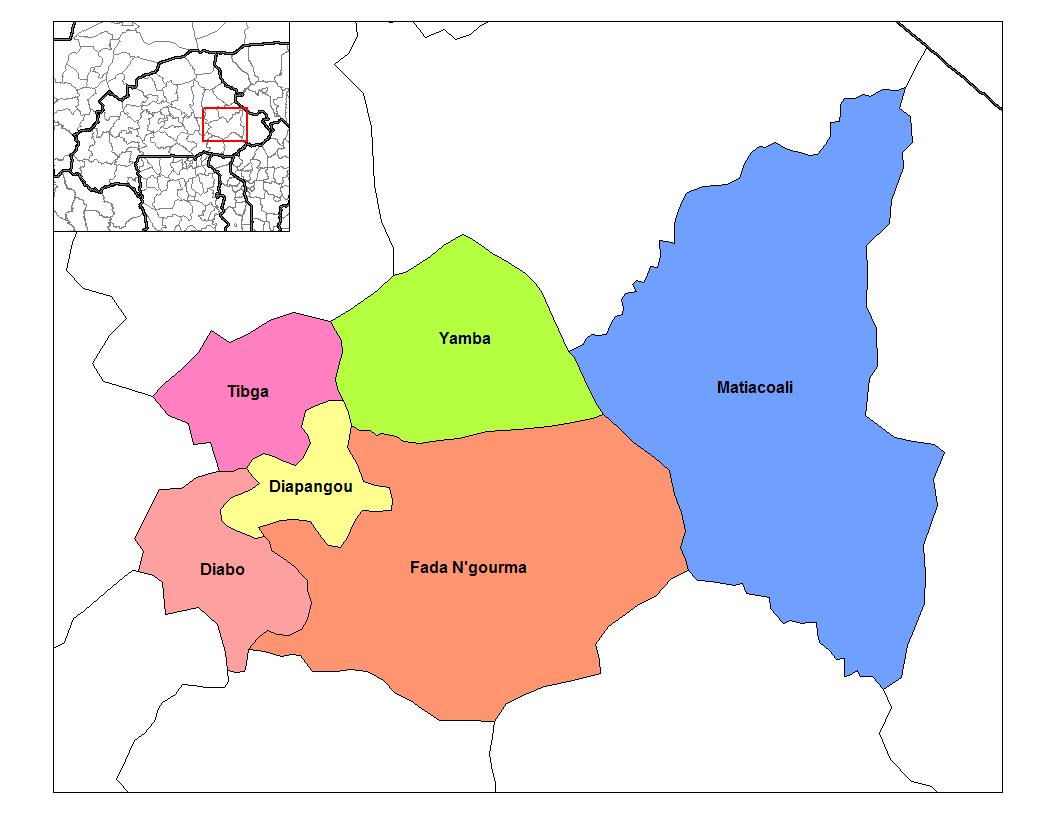
- Diapangou Department location in the province
- Country: Burkina Faso
- Province: Gourma Province

Area
  - Total: 178.8 sq mi (463.2 km^{2})

Population (2019 census)
  - Total: 34,087
  - Density: 190.6/sq mi (73.59/km^{2})
- Time zone: UTC+0 (GMT 0)

Diapangou is a department or commune of Gourma Province in north-eastern Burkina Faso. Its capital lies at the town of Diapangou.

== Towns and villages ==
Balga
Bandiabgou
Bardiadeni
Bassabliga
Bianargou
Boaka
Bossongri
Comboari
Diangaïe
Doaligou
Fonghin
Kolonkogo
Komanpergou
Kouloungou
Lantargou
Litiayenli
Louargou
Nahambouga
Okargouni
Otiabragouni
Ountandéni
Pampangou
Pendori
Sikidéni
Tchomboado
Tielba
Tilonti
Toboani
Tokouna
Wakou
Yensemdéni
