= Diabo Department =

Coordinates: 12°01′00″N 0°02′00″W

Diabo
- Department
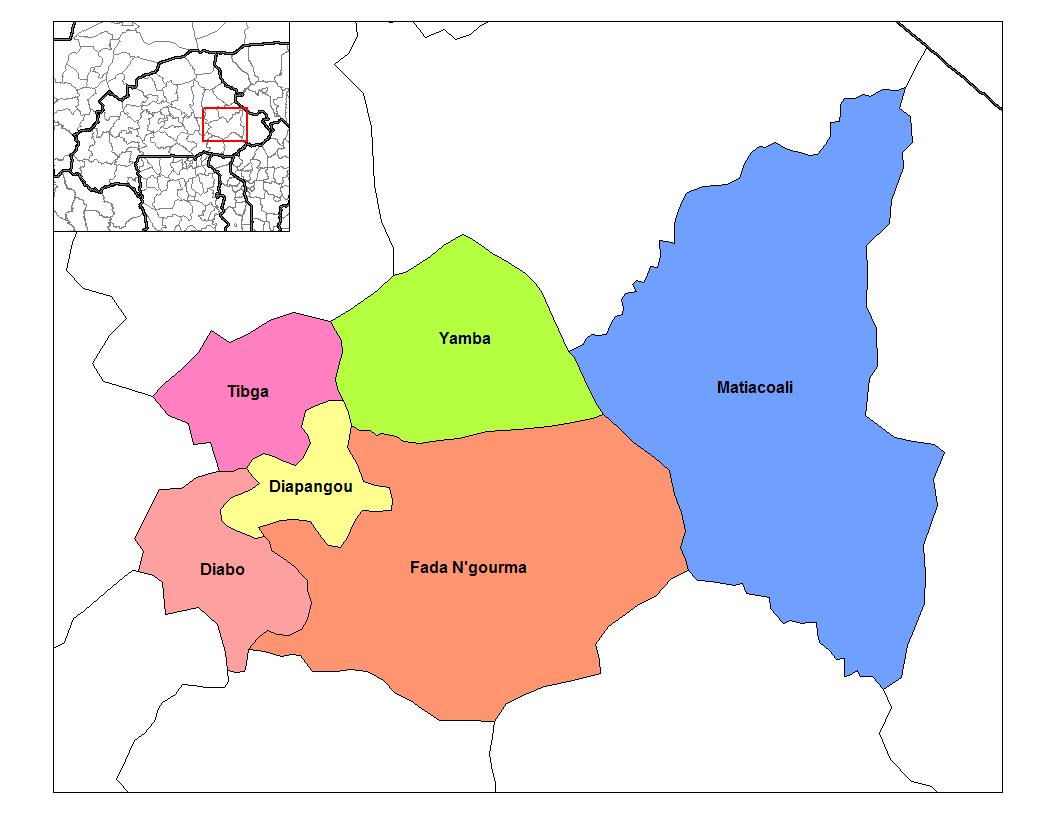
- Diabo Department location in the province
- Country: Burkina Faso
- Province: Gourma Province

Area
  - Total: 261.4 sq mi (677.1 km^{2})

Population (2019 census)
  - Total: 57,463
  - Density: 219.8/sq mi (84.87/km^{2})
- Time zone: UTC+0 (GMT 0)

Diabo is a department or commune of Gourma Province in north-eastern Burkina Faso. Its capital lies at the town of Diabo.

== Towns and villages ==
- Diabo (Chef-lieu)
- Bagatenga
- Benkoko
- Boudierghin
- Boulgatenga
- Bouloumbougdi
- Boulyoghin
- Bouri
- Combemgogo
- Daboadin
- Dazouri
- Dianga
- Diapangou-Peulh
- Diogbakin
- Gninboadin-Diabo
- Guilgin
- Kiabga
- Kalbekin
- Kamona
- Kandaga
- Kanhomé
- Koulpissi
- Koulwoko
- Kouriogin
- Lantaogo
- Lantaogo-Tamassogo
- Lanti
- Lorgho
- Louloubtenga
- Maouda
- Mocomtore
- Nabi-Raogo
- Nintenga
- Ouavoussé
- Piga
- Pikoinsé
- Pissalboré
- Pisseguédin
- Pitenga
- Pizonguin
- Pohemtenga
- Saatenga
- Sabioken
- Sanéwabo
- Sanéwabo-Yarcé
- Seiga
- Silmitenga
- Tamkoursi
- Tampanga
- Tangandé
- Tangaye
- Tanlallé
- Tansouka
- Tanziéga
- Tiabga
- Tiabtamassogo
- Yantenga
- Yanwéga
- Yarcétenga
- Zamsé
- Zanré
- Zecca
- Ziella
- Zinknabbin
- Zonatenga
