= Tibga Department =

Department in Burkina Faso

Coordinates: 12°13′9.24″N 0°1′16.63″E

Tibga
- Department
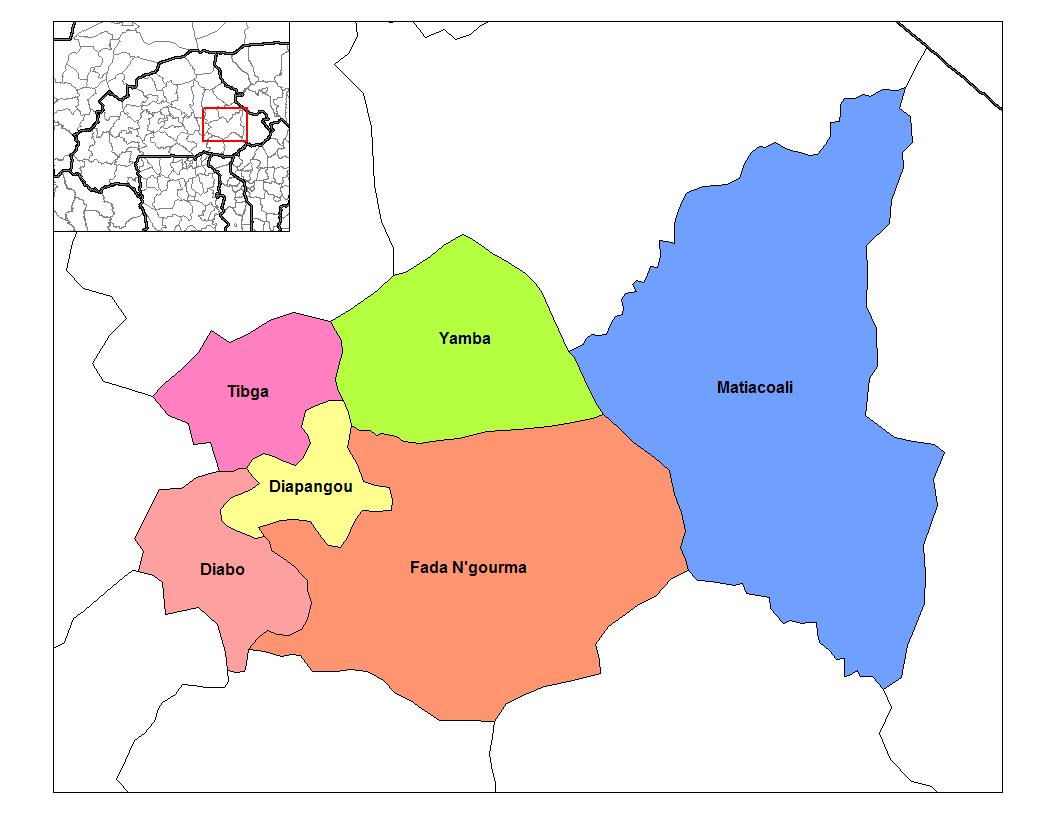
- Tibga Department location in Gourma Province
- Country: Burkina Faso
- Province: Gourma Province

Area
  - Total: 295.6 sq mi (765.6 km^{2})

Population (2019 census)
  - Total: 45,463
  - Density: 153.8/sq mi (59.38/km^{2})
- Time zone: UTC+0 (GMT 0)

Tibga is a department or commune of Gourma Province in north-eastern Burkina Faso. Its capital lies at the town of Tibga.

== Towns and villages ==
The department consists of a capital, Tibga, and 41 villages:

- Bandaokanré
- Bangou
- Banliboara
- Bassambily
- Belemgnoubli
- Biliguimtenga
- Bogré
- Bokou
- Bolontou
- Bondioguin
- Dasamlagfo
- Dékouda
- Dianga
- Djingfoaga
- Gandemtenga
- Guilyendé
- Hamtiouri
- Kaldiouani
- Kalkomé
- Kalkouri
- Kogossi
- Kontaga
- Kontaga-Peulh
- Liguiditenga
- Modré
- Mossitenga
- Nagbangou
- Nassobdo
- Nassoboré
- Ouanga
- Poringuin
- Soadobila
- Soatou
- Tambourbangou
- Tampour-Kolkomé
- Tiantiaka
- Tiongo
- Yaryomé
- Yéga
- Youkin
- Youlmenga
