= Yamba Department =

Coordinates: 12°17′52″N 0°20′12″E

Yamba
- Department
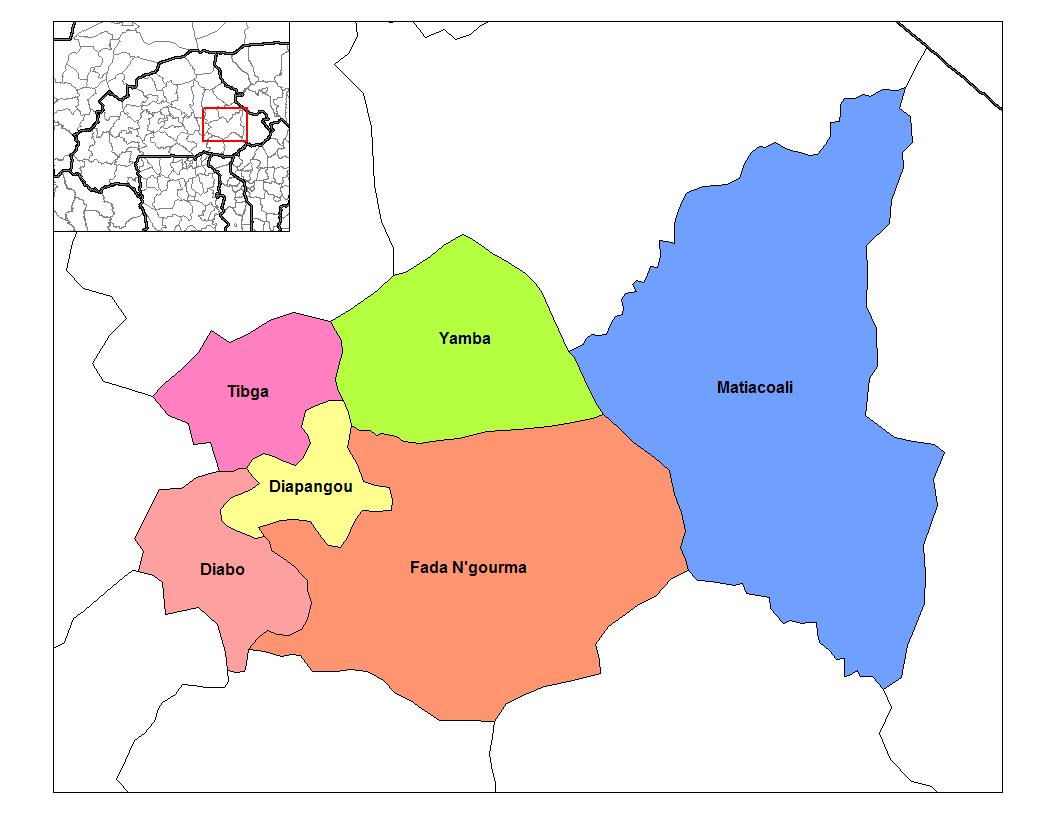
- Yamba Department location in the province
- Country: Burkina Faso
- Province: Gourma Province

Area
  - Total: 542 sq mi (1,403 km^{2})

Population (2019 census)
  - Total: 37,943
  - Density: 70.04/sq mi (27.04/km^{2})
- Time zone: UTC+0 (GMT 0)

Yamba is a department or commune of Gourma Province in north-eastern Burkina Faso. Its capital is the town of Yamba.
