= Fada N'Gourma Department =

Coordinates: 12.0667°N 0.35°E

Fada N’Gourma
- Department
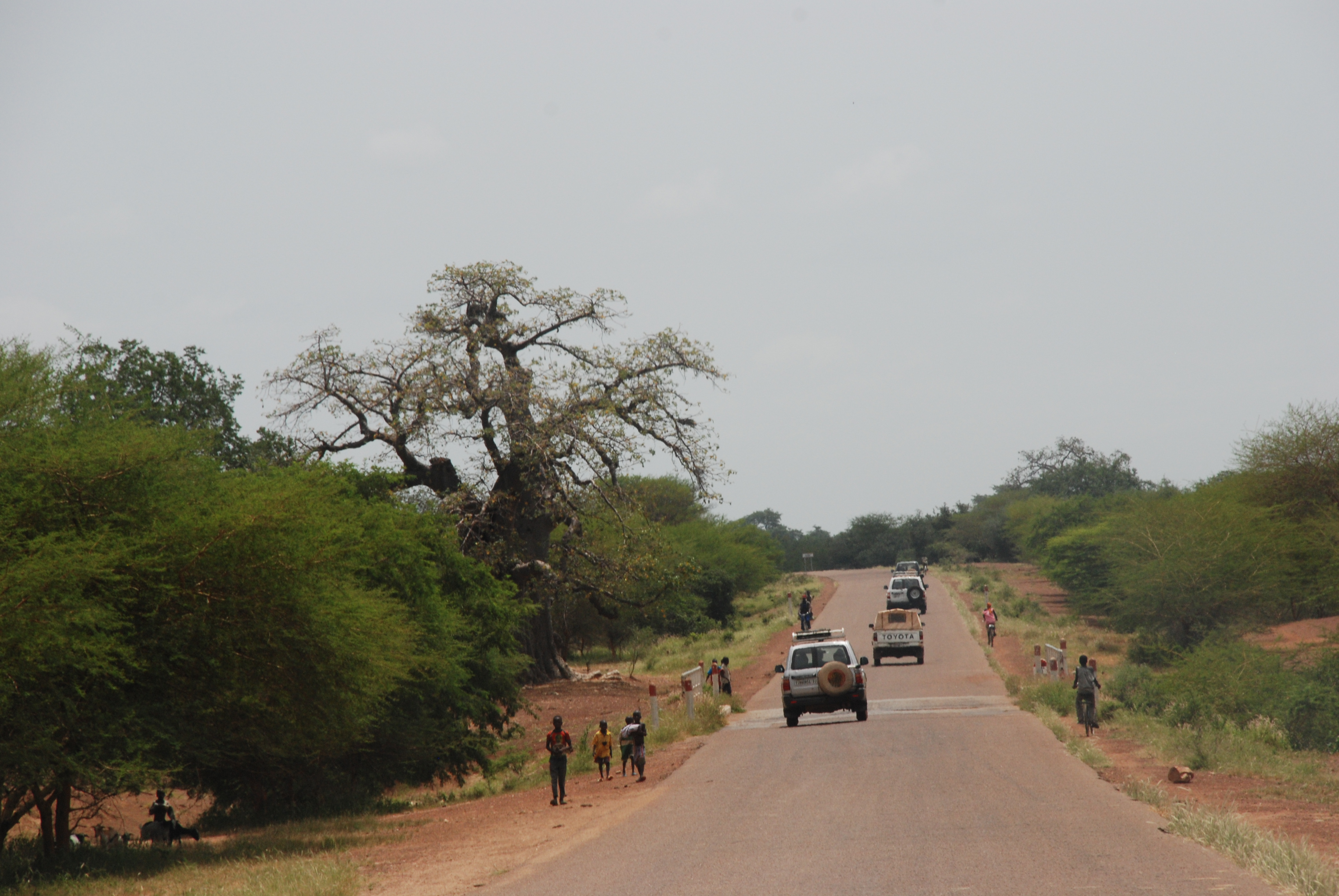
- Scenery south of Fada N’Gourma on the road to Benin

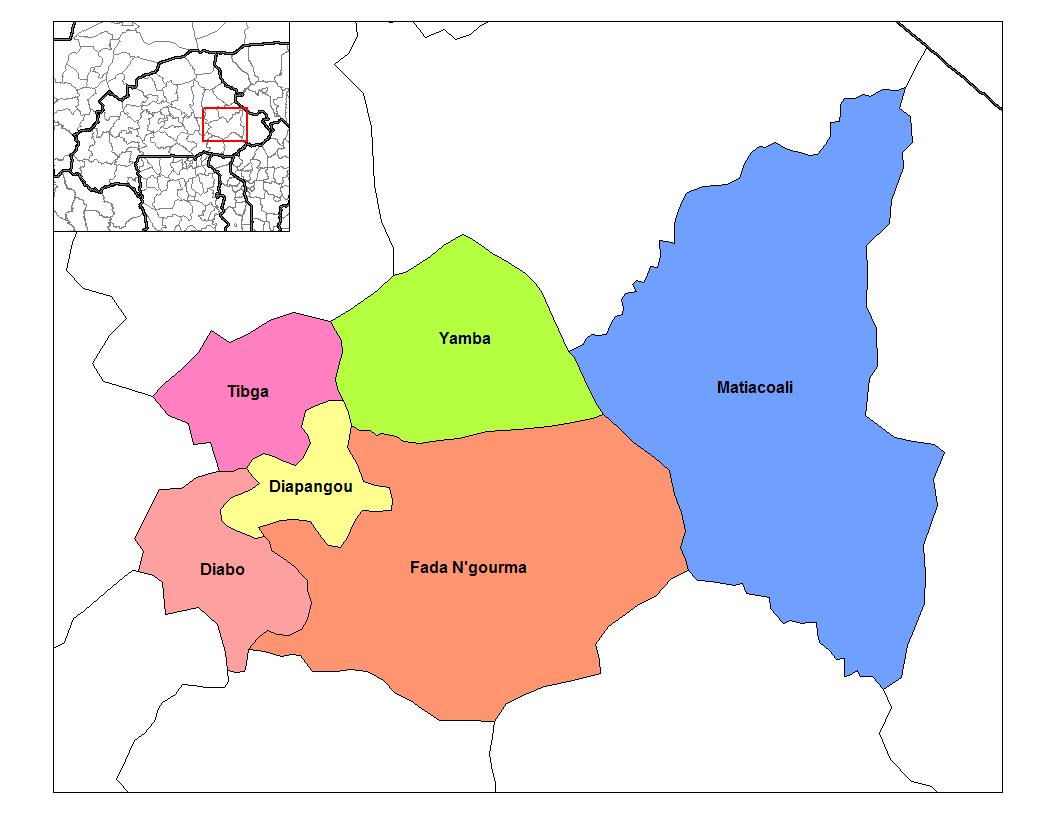
- Fada N’Gourma Department location in the province
- Country: Burkina Faso
- Province: Gourma Province

Area
  - Department: 1,324 sq mi (3,429 km^{2})

Population (2019 census)
  - Department: 187,692
  - Density: 141.8/sq mi (54.74/km^{2})
  - Urban: 73,200
- Time zone: UTC+0 (GMT 0)

Fada N’Gourma is a department or commune of Gourma Province in north-eastern Burkina Faso. Its capital is the town of Fada N’Gourma.
