= Initiative: Eau =

International NGO focusing on drinking water availability

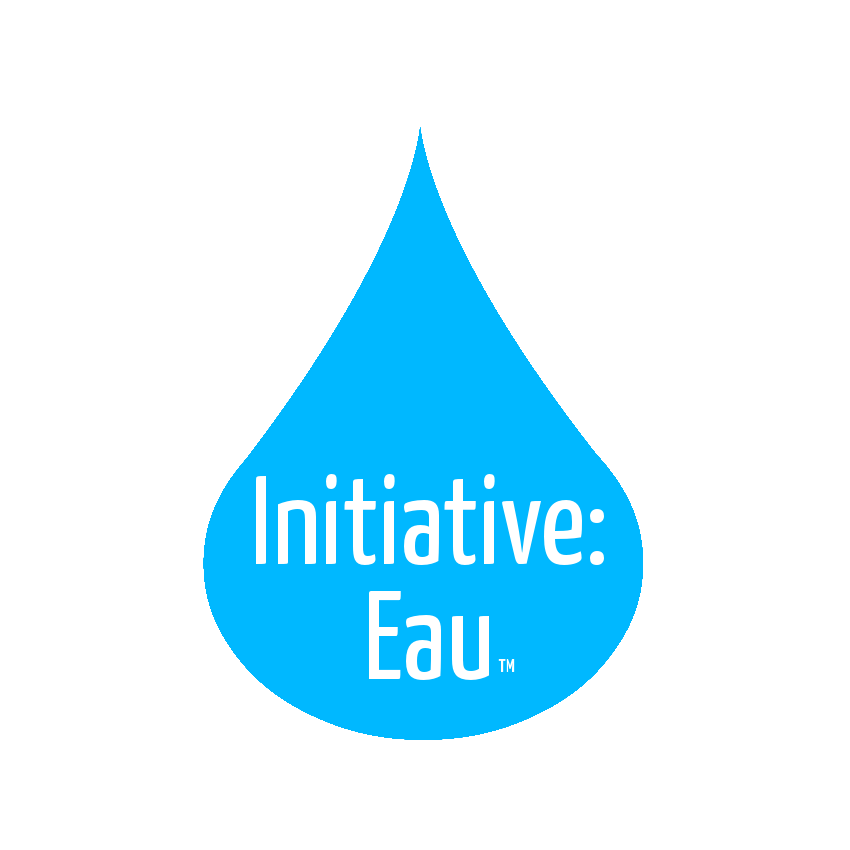
- Founded: 2013
- Founded at: Bangor, Maine, U.S.A.
- Type: NGO
- Tax ID no.: 46-3599128
- Purpose: To strengthen water, sanitation, and hygiene capacity in developing areas and crisis zones to improve health outcomes.
- Headquarters: Washington, D.C., U.S.A.
- Region served: Burkina Faso
- Fields: Water supply, water data, public health
- President and CEO: Donald J. Brooks
- Website: www.initiativeeau.ngo

Initiative: Eau is an international nonprofit, non-governmental organization dedicated to strengthening water, sanitation, and hygiene capacity in developing areas and crisis zones for improved public health. Founded in 2013, Initiative: Eau is headquartered in Washington, D.C., U.S.A. with its regional office for West Africa in Fada N'gourma, Burkina Faso. The organization is in Special Consultative Status with the United Nations Economic and Social Council since 2017.

Initiative: Eau is a member of Sanitation and Water for All, the Global Water Partnership, the Rural Water Supply Network, and the Global Network of Civil Society Organisations for Disaster Reduction. The organization received the Technology Innovation Award from the International Society for Neglected Tropical Diseases (ISNTD) Water conference in November 2016 for WASHMobile, the predecessor to current program H2Odata.city. The organization was named a "2019 Top-Rated Nonprofit" by GreatNonprofits and received a 2020 Platinum Seal of Transparency from GuideStar.

== History ==
Initiative: Eau was founded on 31 July 2013 by Donald J. Brooks and Christina Long in Bangor, Maine, U.S.A. The two created the initiative following a presentation at their high school describing the Water Crisis in Burkina Faso. Initiative: Eau was borne out of a series of charitable 5 kilometer road races which took place in Maine and northern Massachusetts.

As of August 2016, the organization had a staff of 14 across three continents.

== Past projects ==
H2Odata.city
H2Odata.city is a water infrastructure sustainability project to improve local water infrastructure monitoring and maintenance capacity through the training and responsibilization of maintenance entities. An instance of the project in Fada N'gourma, Burkina Faso named H2Odata.city.fada was recently funded through a community development grant from the Embassy of the United States of America to Burkina Faso in Ouagadougou and another from the International Foundation. The project is expected to result in a 66% reduction in the number of water source breakdowns and an 83% reduction in the amount of time a water source remains non-functional after breaking in the city.

Foire de l'Eau
The Foire de l'Eau is a bi-annual event hosted by Initiative: Eau and the BARKA Foundation. The first edition of the event was held between 21 and 25 March 2018 in Fada N'gourma, and was the national World Water Day event for Burkina Faso. Organized with a number of partners including Eau Vive, WaterAid, the Gourma Water Agency, the Office National de l'Eau et de l'Assainissement (ONEA), UNICEF, and the Ministry of Water and Sanitation of Burkina Faso. The event aimed to promote synergies and collaboration between the various actors of the Burkinabè water, sanitation, and hygiene (WASH) sector.
