= Matiacoali =

Matiakoali
- Location within Burkina Faso, West Africa
- Coordinates: 12.353417°N 1.029968°E
- Country: Burkina Faso
- Time zone: UTC+0 (GMT)

Matiakoali is a town in the Est Region of Burkina Faso.
