= Fada N'gourma =

Fada N'gourma Nũngu (Mossi)
- City
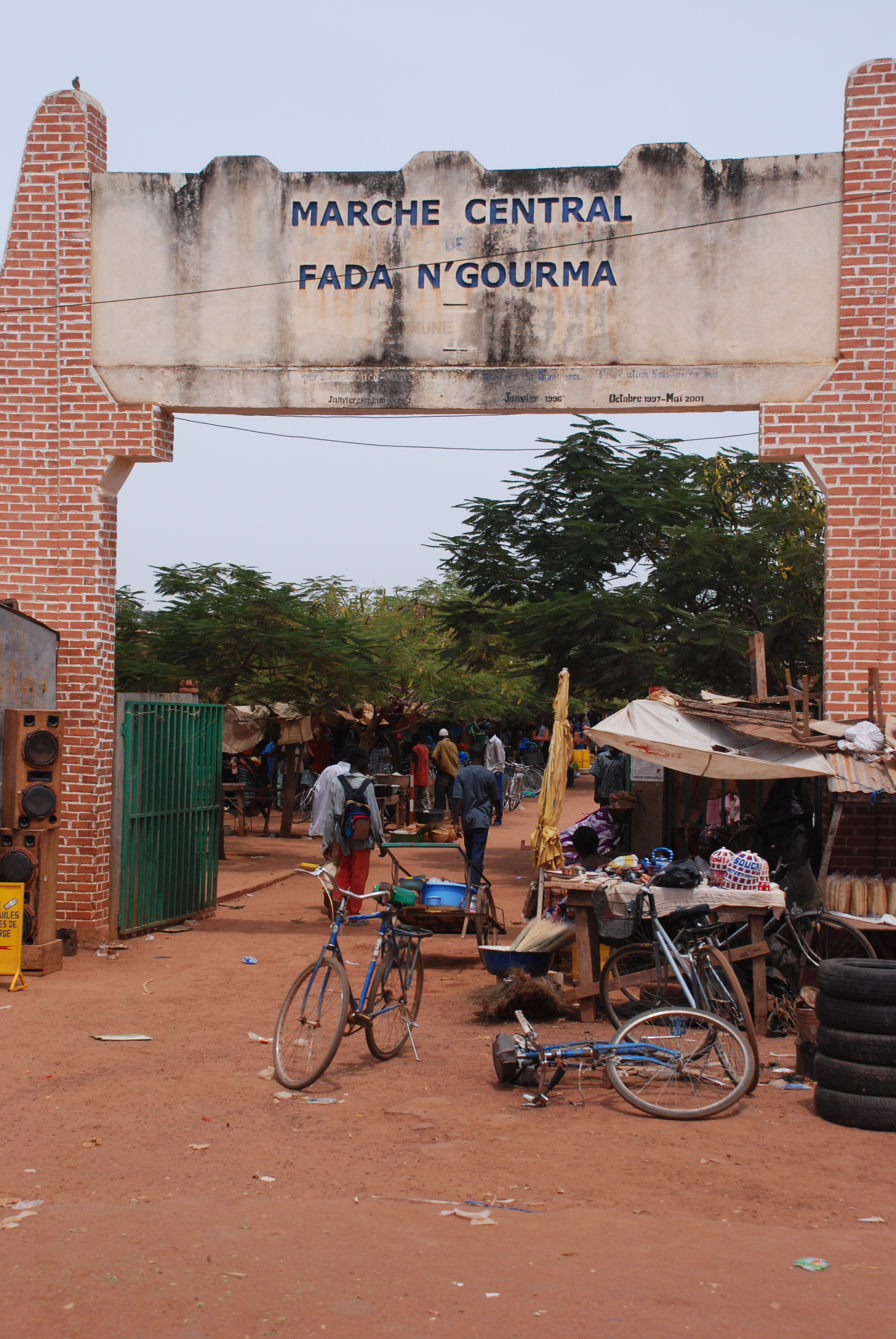
- Entrance to the market in Fada N'Gourma

- Location within Burkina Faso
- Coordinates: 12°03′N 0°22′E
- Country: Burkina Faso
- Region: Est Region
- Province: Gourma Province
- Department: Fada N'Gourma Department
- Incorporated: 1970

Government
  - Mayor: Yendifimba Jean-Claude Louari

Area
  - Total: 36 km^{2} (14 sq mi)
- Elevation: 294 m (965 ft)

Population (2019 census)
  - Total: 73,200
- Time zone: UTC+0 (GMT)

Fada N'gourma, also written Fada-Ngourma or Noungu (Mossi: Nũngu), is a city and an important market town in eastern Burkina Faso, lying 219 kilometres (136 mi) east of Ouagadougou, in the Gourmantché area. It is the capital of the Est Region and Gourma Province, and is also the seat of the king of the Gurma and the Roman Catholic Diocese of Fada N'Gourma.

It is primarily known for its blanket and carpet manufacturing as well as honey production.

== Etymology ==
In Hausa, Fada N'gourma means "residence of the chief of Gourma", or "place where one pays the tax".

== History ==
The town was founded by Diaba Lompo as Bingo at the beginning of the 13th century. In the 16th and 17th centuries it was the capital of a Gourmantché state that frequently warred with the Songhai Empire. The French arrived at the town in January 1895 and the local Gurma ruler accepted French protection.

== Climate ==
Fada N'gourma has a tropical savanna climate (Köppen climate classification Aw).

Climate data for Fada N'gourma (1991–2020, extremes 1919–present)
Month	Jan	Feb	Mar	Apr	May	Jun	Jul	Aug	Sep	Oct	Nov	Dec	Year
Record high °C (°F)	41.0 (105.8)	44.4 (111.9)	44.1 (111.4)	45.2 (113.4)	44.4 (111.9)	41.4 (106.5)	39.4 (102.9)	37.0 (98.6)	38.8 (101.8)	41.8 (107.2)	42.0 (107.6)	40.4 (104.7)	45.2 (113.4)
Mean daily maximum °C (°F)	33.8 (92.8)	36.9 (98.4)	39.8 (103.6)	40.1 (104.2)	37.7 (99.9)	34.6 (94.3)	31.9 (89.4)	30.6 (87.1)	32.1 (89.8)	35.4 (95.7)	36.9 (98.4)	34.7 (94.5)	35.4 (95.7)
Daily mean °C (°F)	25.5 (77.9)	28.6 (83.5)	32.0 (89.6)	33.0 (91.4)	31.5 (88.7)	29.1 (84.4)	27.0 (80.6)	26.1 (79.0)	26.7 (80.1)	28.2 (82.8)	28.0 (82.4)	26.0 (78.8)	28.5 (83.3)
Mean daily minimum °C (°F)	18.3 (64.9)	21.3 (70.3)	24.9 (76.8)	27.1 (80.8)	26.4 (79.5)	24.5 (76.1)	23.3 (73.9)	22.7 (72.9)	22.8 (73.0)	23.0 (73.4)	20.4 (68.7)	18.5 (65.3)	22.8 (73.0)
Record low °C (°F)	10.7 (51.3)	11.4 (52.5)	15.8 (60.4)	17.5 (63.5)	13.5 (56.3)	15.0 (59.0)	17.0 (62.6)	18.5 (65.3)	18.0 (64.4)	15.2 (59.4)	11.8 (53.2)	8.4 (47.1)	8.4 (47.1)
Average precipitation mm (inches)	0.0 (0.0)	2.1 (0.08)	6.9 (0.27)	29.0 (1.14)	81.8 (3.22)	114.8 (4.52)	177.5 (6.99)	249.3 (9.81)	142.9 (5.63)	46.3 (1.82)	0.5 (0.02)	0.0 (0.0)	851.1 (33.51)
Average precipitation days (≥ 1.0 mm)	0.0	0.1	0.8	2.7	6.7	7.9	11.2	14.1	10.0	4.5	0.1	0.0	58.1
Average relative humidity (%)	26	25	27	43	58	69	78	84	83	71	46	31	53
Mean monthly sunshine hours	268.8	245.3	249.0	238.6	254.7	238.2	217.0	192.1	214.5	260.6	271.1	274.4	2,924.3
Source 1: World Meteorological Organization, Meteo Climat (record highs and lows)
Source 2: Deutscher Wetterdienst (humidity, 1961–1967)

== Health ==
The city features both state and private health facilities. The city is the site of a Regional Hospital Center, the reference hospital for the East region.

== International relations ==
=== Organizations ===
The following international organizations have offices in Fada N'gourma:

- Action Against Hunger
- Helvetas Swiss Intercooperation
- Initiative: Eau
- Îles de Paix

== Sister cities ==
Fada N'Gourma is twinned with:

- Épernay, France
- Great Barrington, Massachusetts, United States
- Tamale, Ghana

== Gallery ==
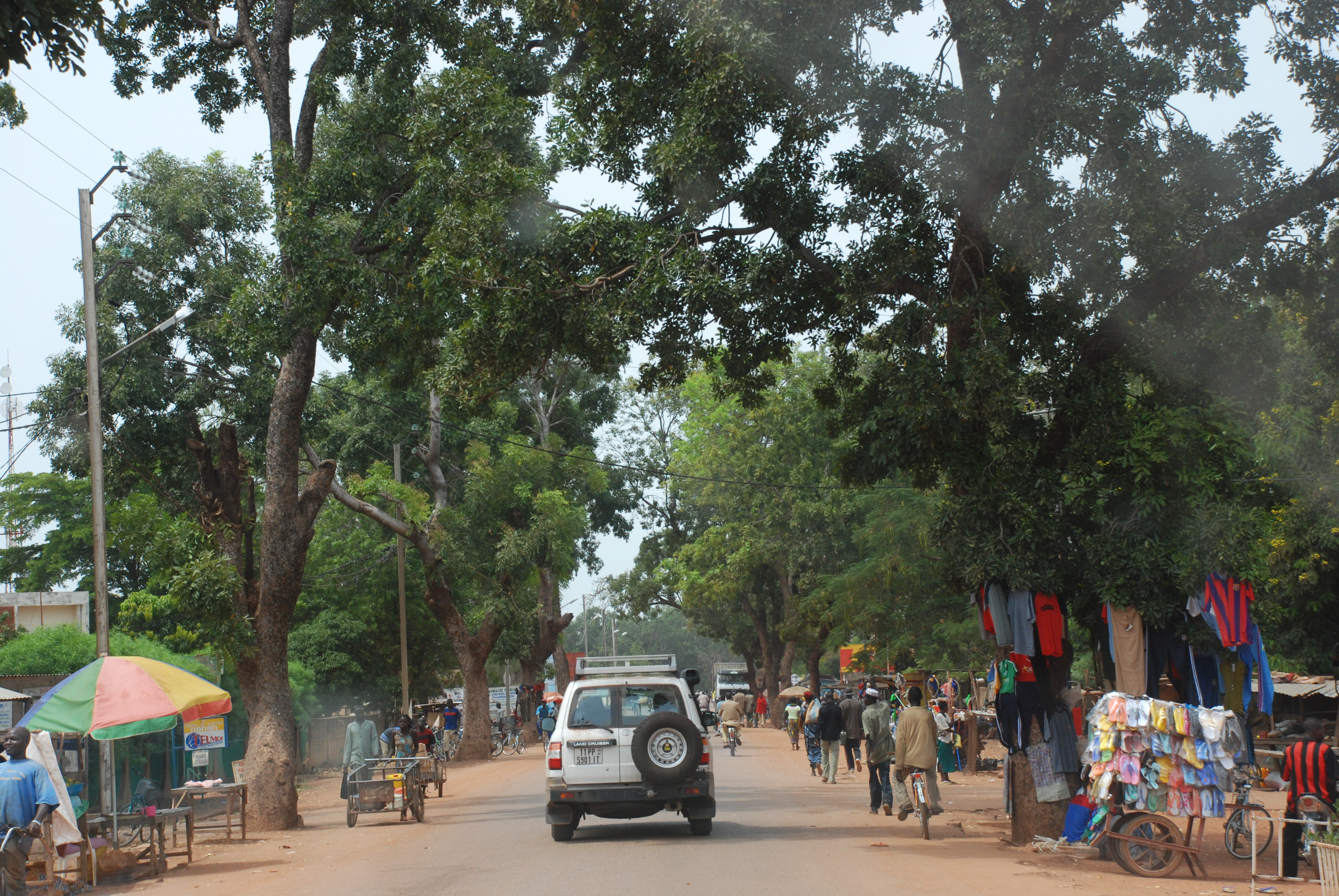
Main street in Fada N'gourma

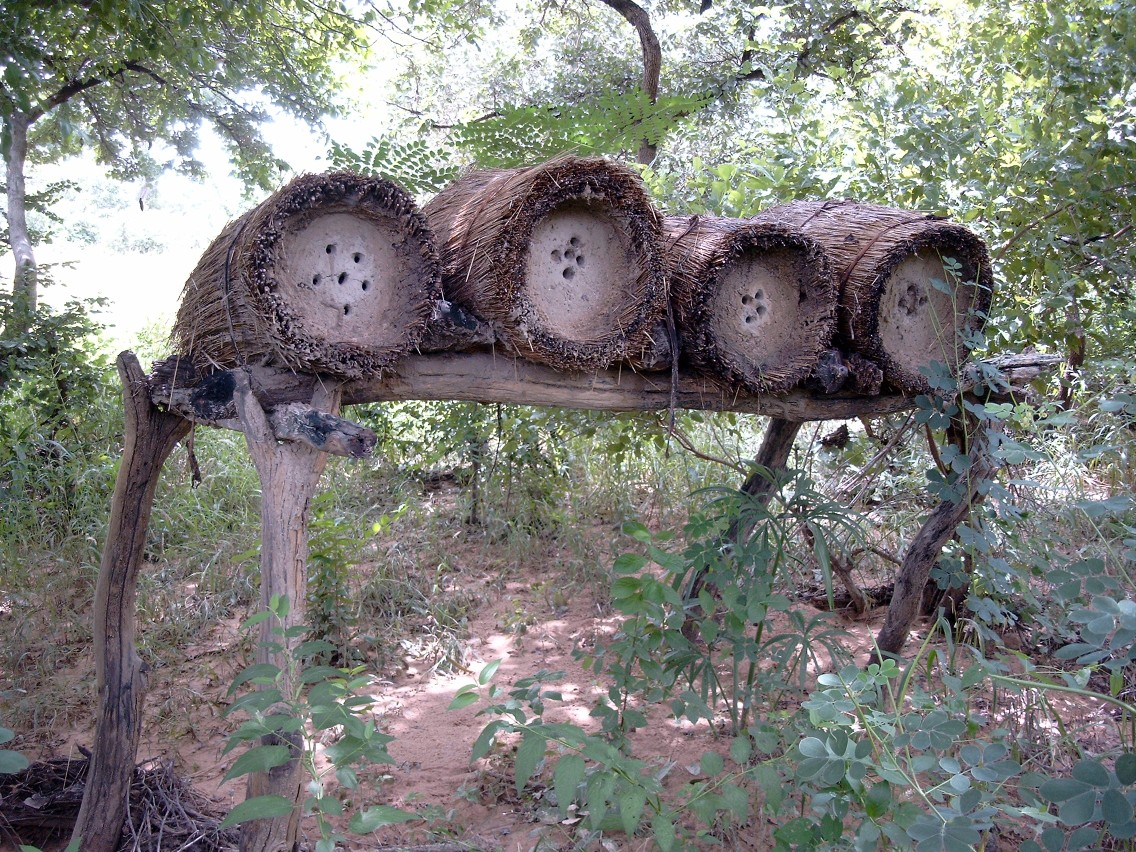
Beehives in Fada N'gourma

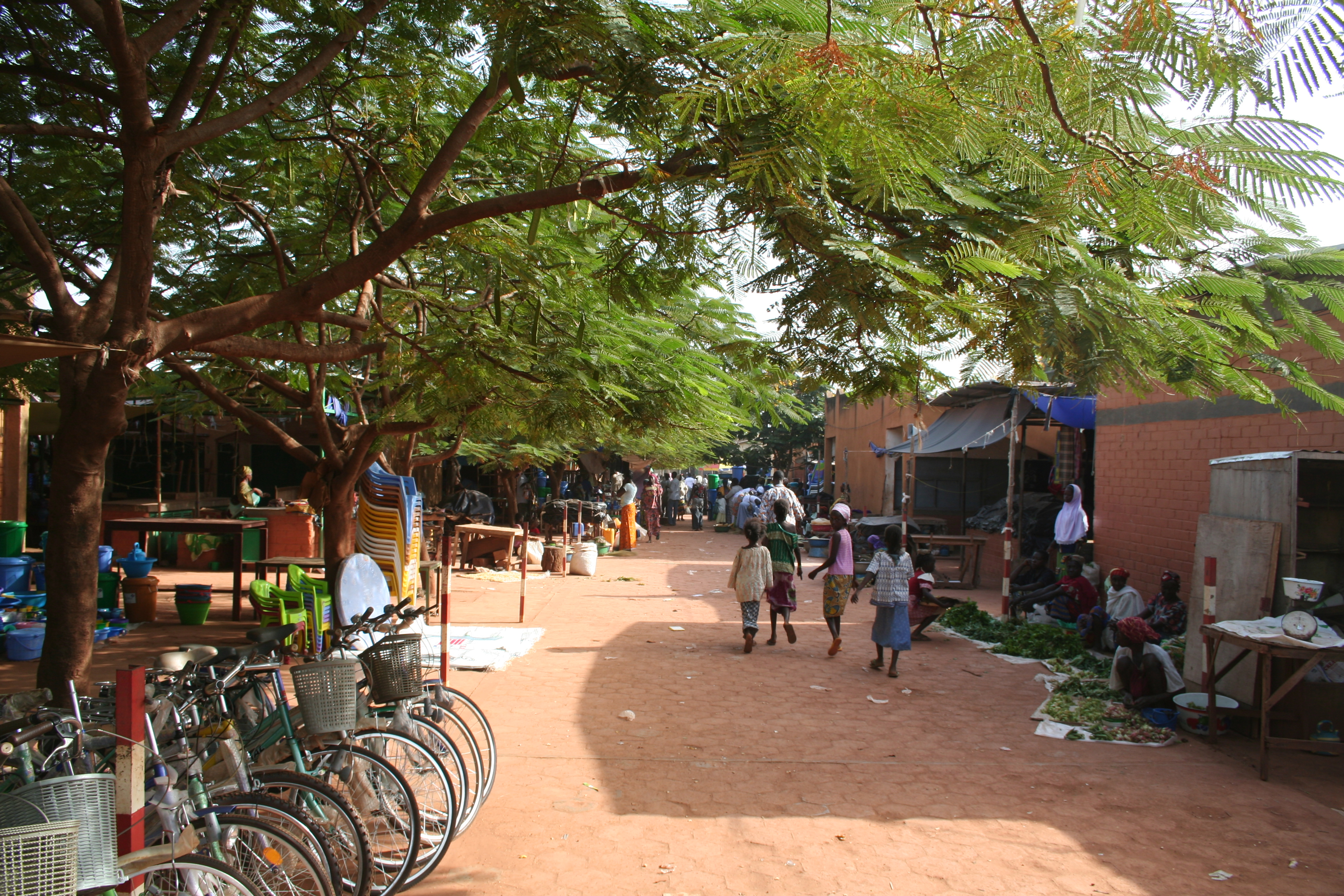
Market in Fada N'gourma
