= Kabaro =

Town in Centre-Ouest, Burkina Faso

- Rural commune
- Location in Burkina Faso
- Coordinates: 11.364934°N 2.525944°W
- Country: Burkina Faso
- Region: Centre-Ouest Region
- Province: Sissili Province
- Department: Niabouri Department

Population (2003)
  - Total: 1,487

Kabaro is a rural commune located in the region of Centre-Ouest in the Sissili Province of Burkina Faso.
