= Prato (disambiguation) =

Prato is a city in Tuscany, Italy.

Prato may also refer to:

== Places ==
=== Italy ===
- Prato allo Stelvio or Prad am Stilfser Joch, a municipality in South Tyrol
- Province of Prato, a province of Tuscany
- Mount Prato, a mountain in the Apennines

=== Switzerland ===
- Prato (Leventina), a municipality in the canton of Ticino
- Prato-Sornico, a former municipality in the canton of Ticino
- Prato, a village in Prato-Sornico

== People ==
- Leopoldo Prato (1845-1896), Italian major
- Katharina Prato (1818–1897), 19th-century Austrian cookbook writer
- Patricio Prato (born 1979), Argentine basketball player

== Other uses ==
- A.C. Prato, an Italian football club of the city of Prato
- Queijo prato, a type of Brazilian cheese
- Prato (cookbook) or The South German Cuisine, an 1858 cookbook by Katharina Prato

== See also ==
- Prata (disambiguation)
