= Prata =

Prata may refer to:

== Places ==
Brazil

- Prata (Minas Gerais), a municipality in the state of Minas Gerais

Burkina Faso

- Prata, Burkina Faso, a village in Sissili Province

Italy

- Prata, Massa Marittima, in the Province of Grosseto
- Prata, Suvereto, in the Province of Livorno
- Prata Camportaccio, a municipality in the Province of Sondrio
- Prata d'Ansidonia, a municipality in the Province of L'Aquila
- Prata di Pordenone, a municipality in the Province of Pordenone
- Prata di Principato Ultra, a municipality in the Province of Avellino
- Prata Sannita, a municipality in the Province of Caserta

== Cuisine ==
- Roti prata, a pancake bread of Malaysian Indian cuisine

== Personalities ==
- Paula Prata (born 1999), Brazilian politician
- Pietro Pileo di Prata (c. 1330–1400), Italian bishop and cardinal
- Scylla Duarte Prata (1923–2025), Brazilian gynecologist

== See also ==
- Prato (disambiguation)
