= Tussio =

Coordinates: 42°15′56″N 13°38′39″E

- Frazione
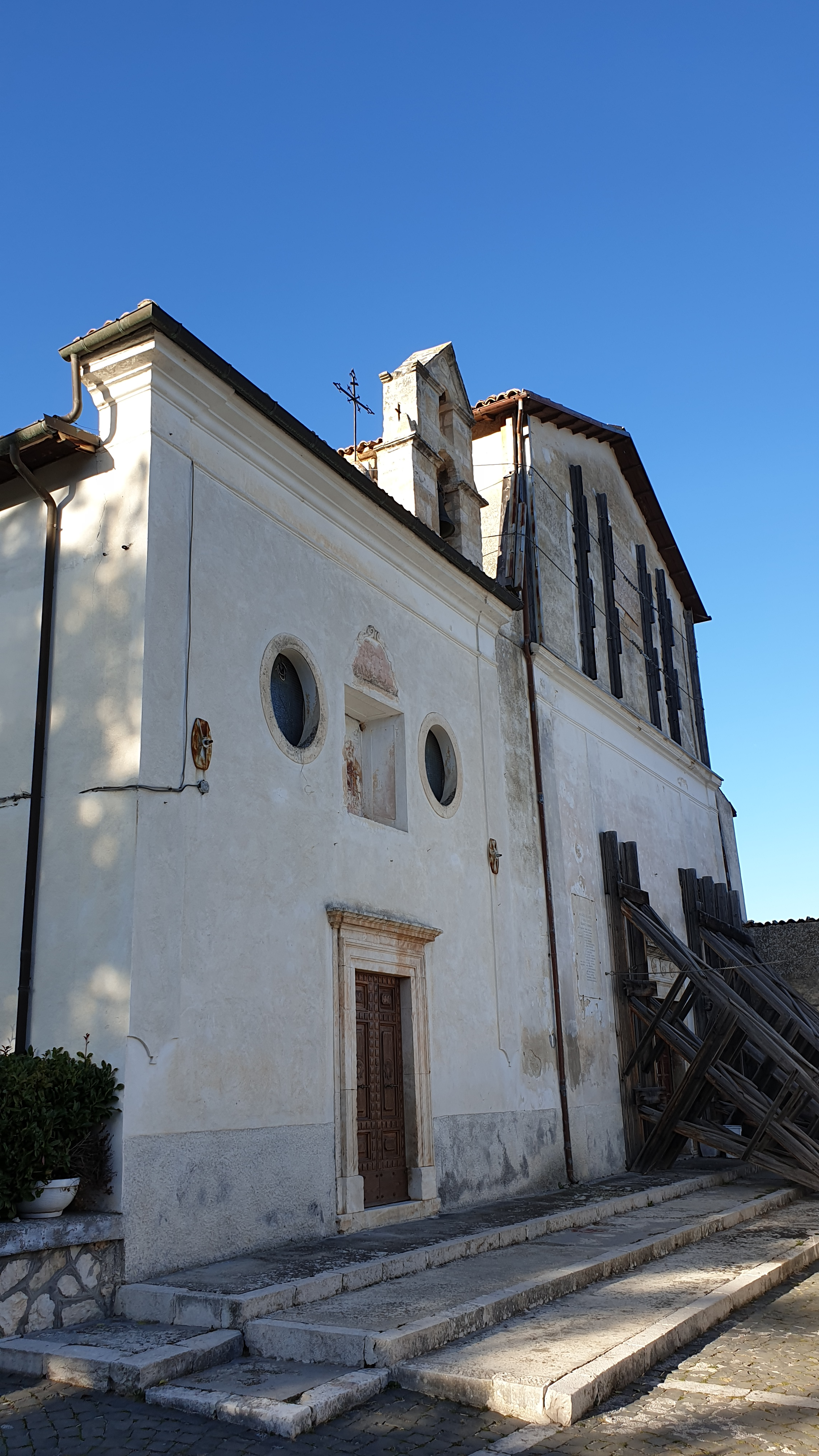
- Tussio
- Interactive map of Tussio
- Country: Italy
- Region: Abruzzo
- Province: L'Aquila
- Commune: Prata d'Ansidonia
- Time zone: UTC+1 (CET)
  - Summer (DST): UTC+2 (CEST)

Tussio is a frazione of Prata d'Ansidonia, in the Province of L'Aquila in the Abruzzo, region of Italy. It is a small town, with a winery named Cantina Valle Tritana.
