= Prata, Burkina Faso =

Prata
- Village
- Location within Burkina Faso, West Africa
- Coordinates: 11°00′N 1°44′W
- Country: Burkina Faso
- Region: Centre-Ouest Region
- Province: Sissili
- Department: Bieha Department
- Time zone: UTC+0 (GMT)

Prata is a village in Bieha Department, Sissili Province in southern Burkina Faso, near the border with Ghana.
