= Léo, Burkina Faso =

Léo
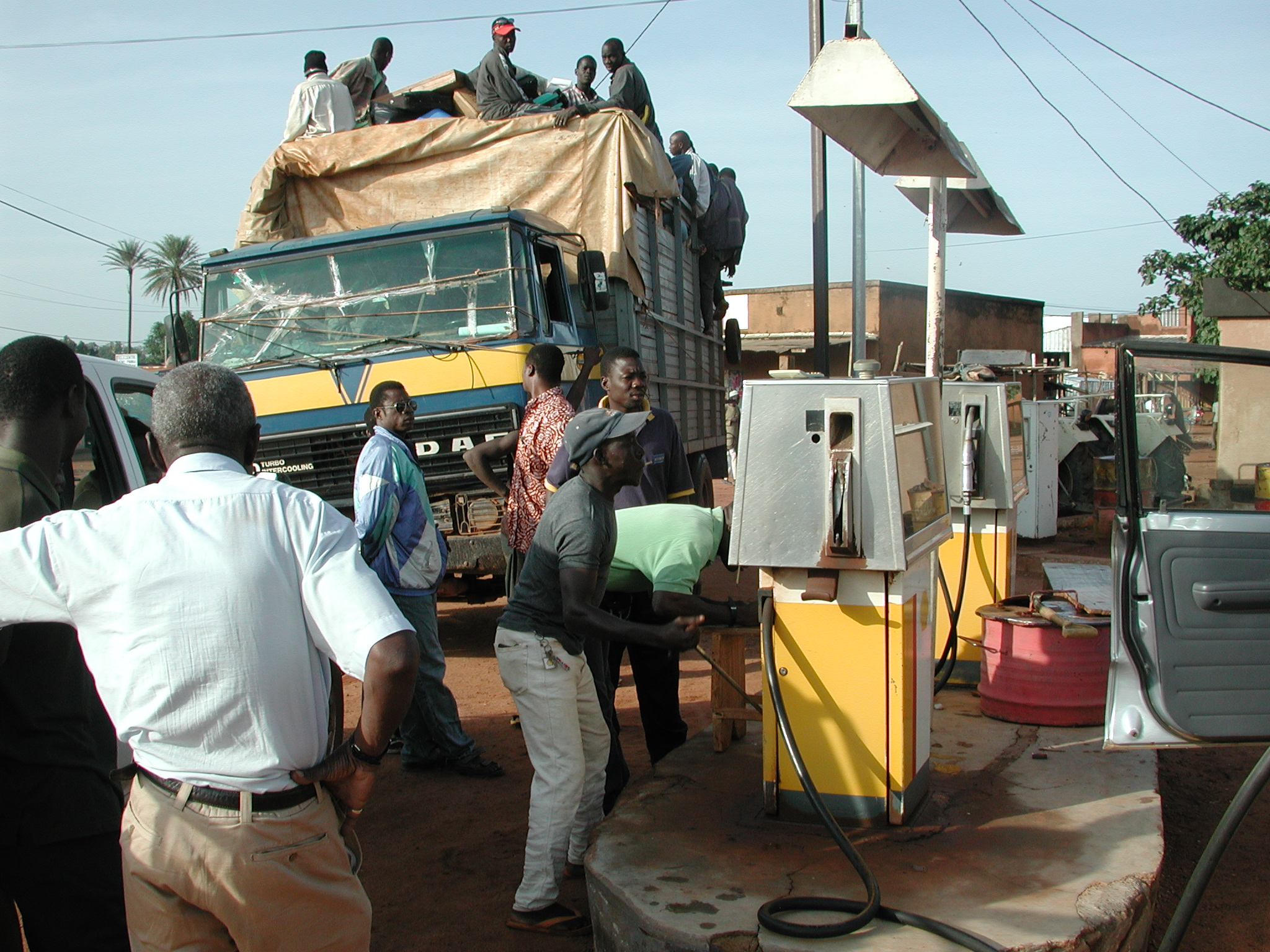

- Location within Burkina Faso
- Coordinates: 11°06′N 2°06′W
- Country: Burkina Faso
- Region: Centre-Ouest Region
- Province: Sissili
- Department: Leo Department
- Elevation: 302 m (991 ft)

Population (2019 census)
  - Total: 51,743
- Time zone: UTC+0 (GMT)

Léo is a town located in the province of Sissili in Burkina Faso. It is the capital of Sissili Province, and is located about 10 kilometers from the border with Ghana. The main ethnic group are the Gurunsi.

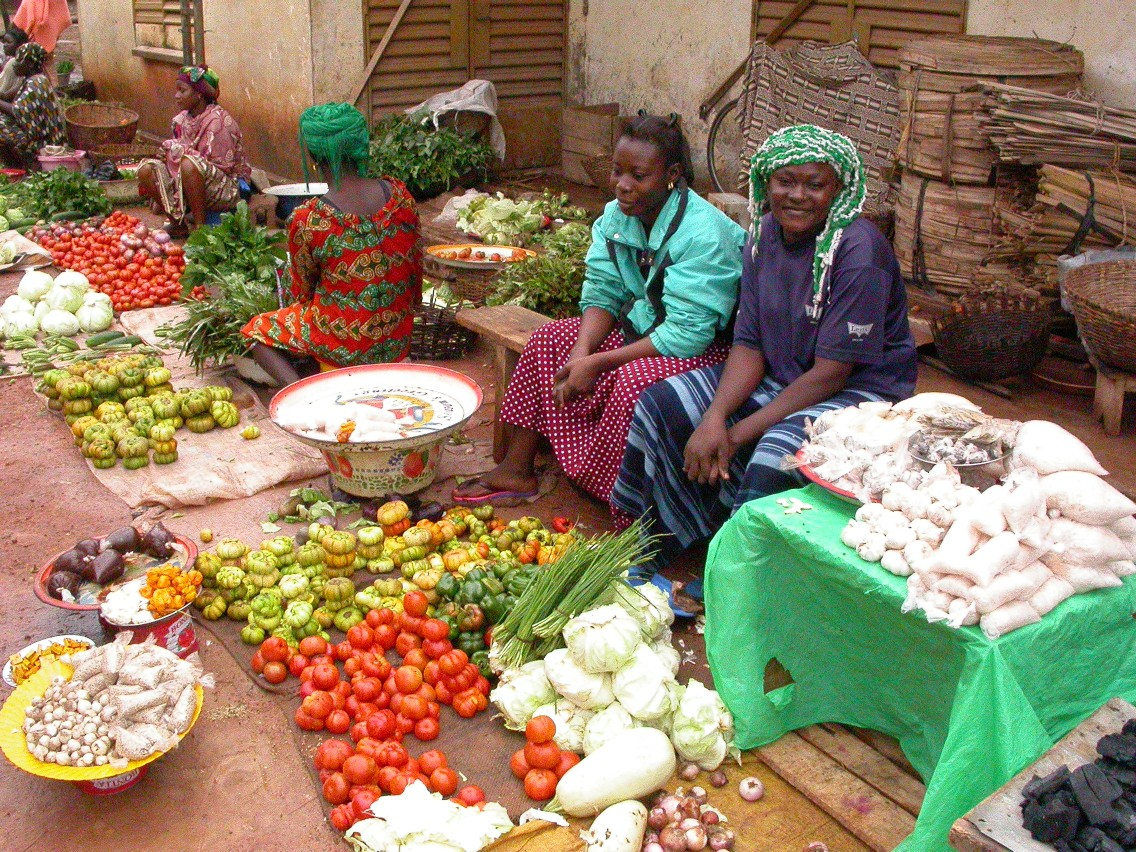
Leo market
