= Boura Department =

Coordinates: 11°02′N 2°30′W

Boura
- Department
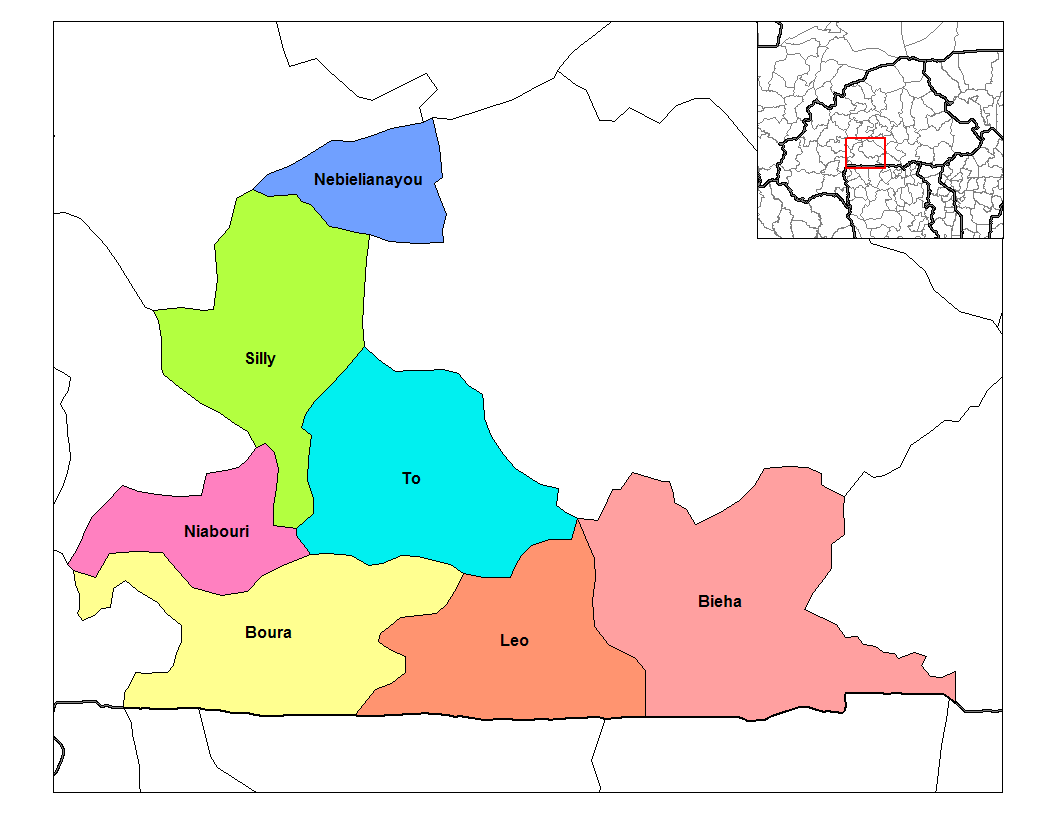
- Boura Department location in the province
- Country: Burkina Faso
- Province: Sissili Province

Area
  - Total: 434 sq mi (1,125 km^{2})

Population (2019 census)
  - Total: 40,448
  - Density: 93.12/sq mi (35.95/km^{2})
- Time zone: UTC+0 (GMT 0)

Boura is a department or commune of Sissili Province in southern Burkina Faso. Its capital lies at the town of Boura.
