= Léo Department =

Coordinates: 11.1000°N 2.1000°W

Leo
- Department
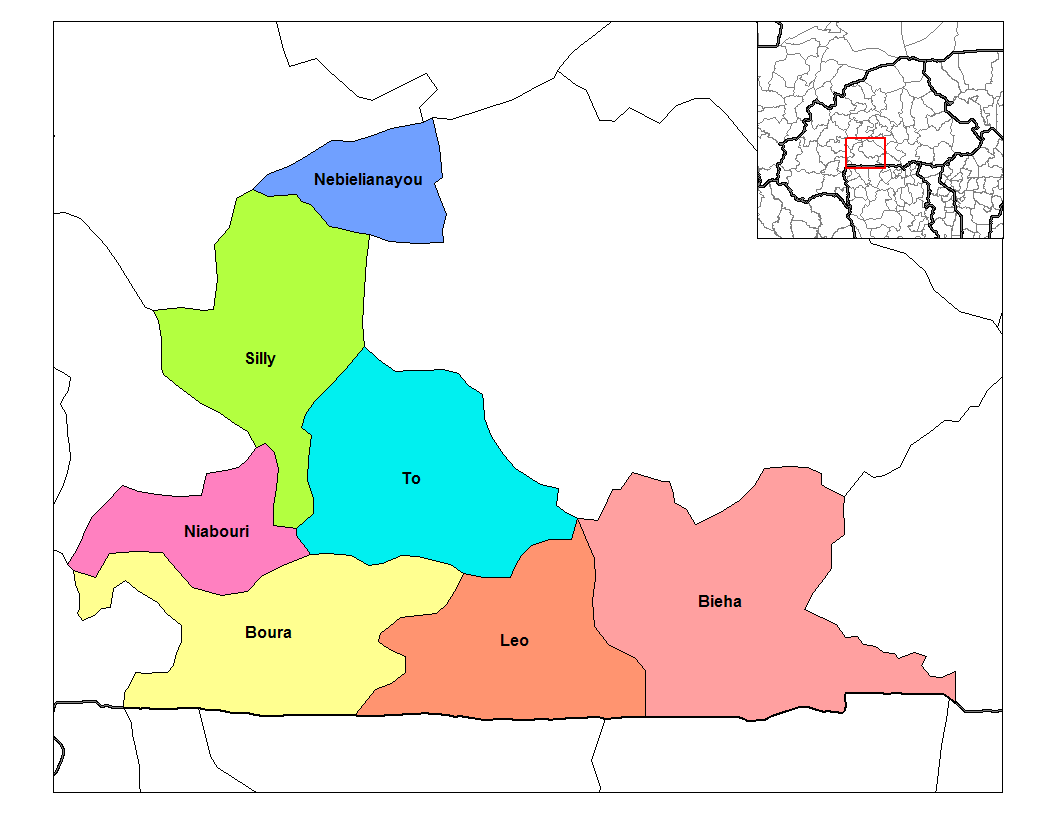
- Leo Department location in the province
- Country: Burkina Faso
- Province: Sissili Province

Area
  - Department: 369 sq mi (955 km^{2})

Population (2019 census)
  - Department: 85,560
  - Density: 232/sq mi (89.6/km^{2})
  - Urban: 51,743
- Time zone: UTC+0 (GMT 0)

Leo is a department or commune of Sissili Province in southern Burkina Faso. Its capital is the town of Leo.

== Towns and villages ==
Towns and villages in the department as follows:

Betiessan (459 inhabitants)

Boutiourou (1068 inhabitants)

Don (742 inhabitants)

Kayero-bo (1797 inhabitants)

Koalga (1021 inhabitants)

Lan (1624 inhabitants)

Nabliliessan (850 inhabitants)

Nadion (1363 inhabitants)

Outoulou (2096 inhabitants)

Sanga, Burkina Faso (1355 inhabitants)

Sissily (2323 inhabitants)

Taga, Léo department (982 inhabitants)

Wan, Léo department (419 inhabitants)

Onliassan (1265 inhabitants)

Kayero-tio (1303 inhabitants)

Fido, Burkina Faso (1008 inhabitants)

Djansia (360 inhabitants)

Djantiogo (311 inhabitants)

Fien (754 inhabitants)

Chef lieu Léo (51743 inhabitants)
