= Tô Department =

Coordinates: 11.4500°N 2.2333°W

Tô
- Department
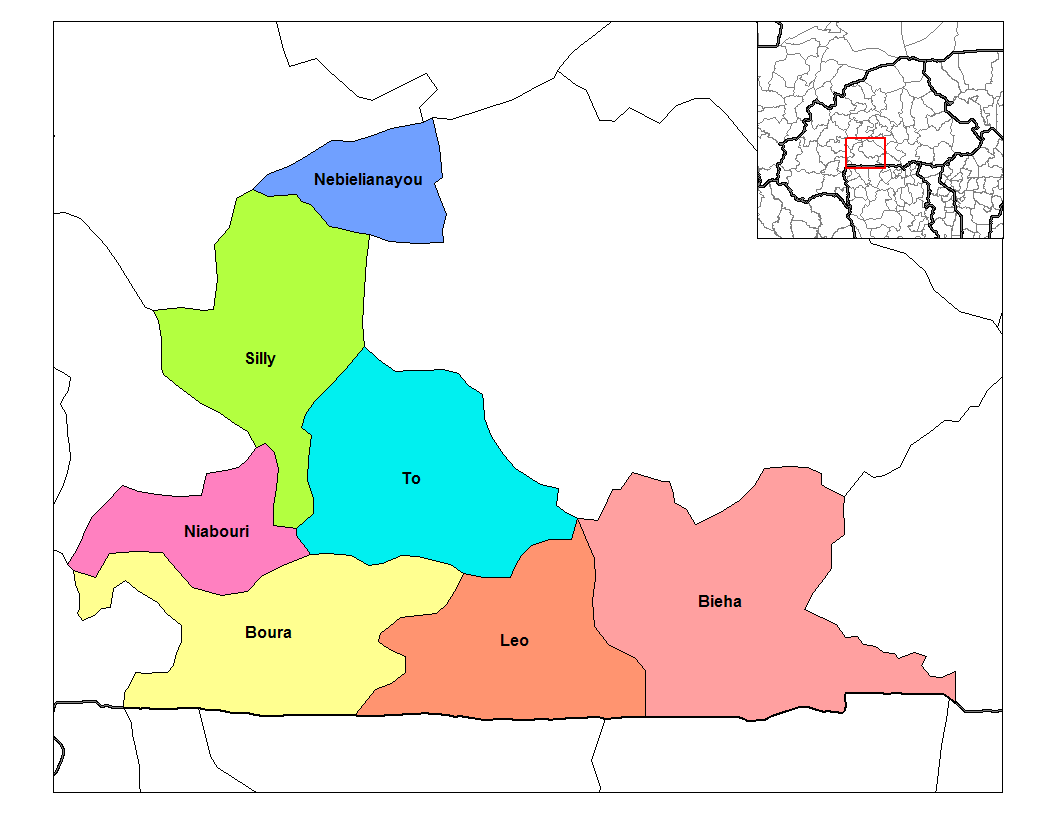
- Tô Department location in the province
- Country: Burkina Faso
- Province: Sissili Province
- Time zone: UTC+0 (GMT 0)

Tô is a department or commune of Sissili Province in southern Burkina Faso. Its capital lies at the town of Tô.
