= Biéha Department =

Coordinates: 11°03′36″N 1°49′17″W

Bieha
- Department
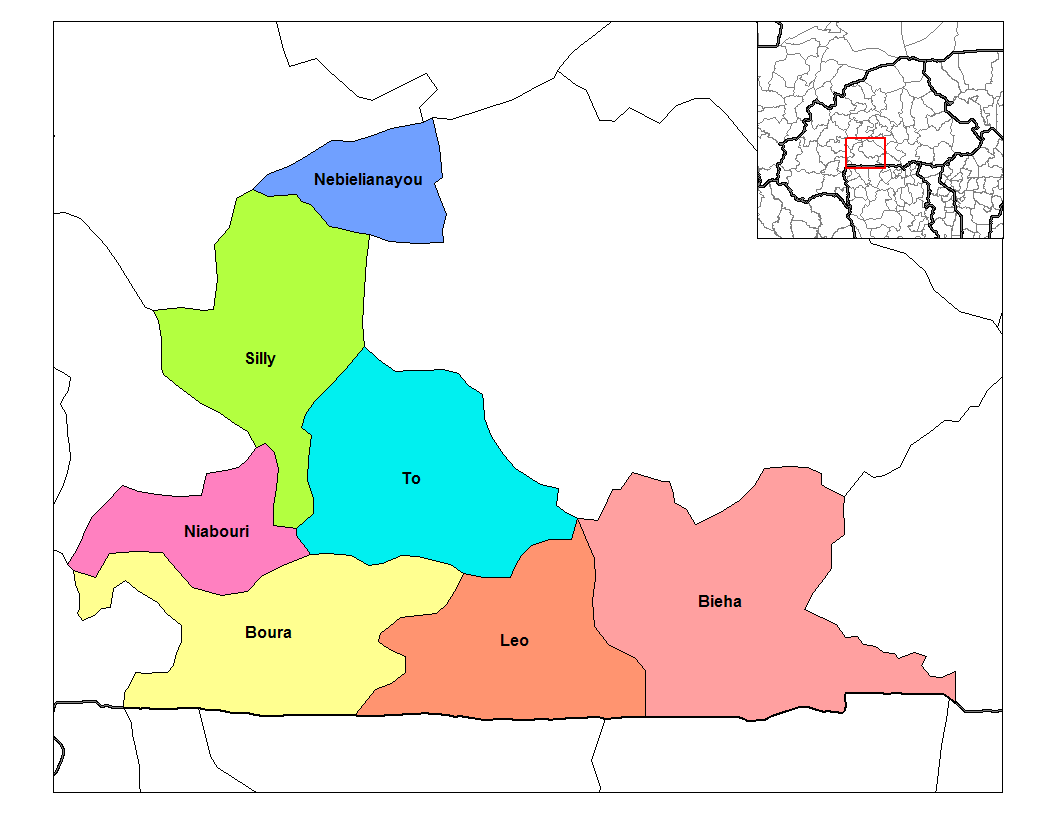
- Bieha Department location in the province
- Country: Burkina Faso
- Province: Sissili Province

Area
  - Total: 675 sq mi (1,748 km^{2})

Population (2019 census)
  - Total: 52,733
  - Density: 78.13/sq mi (30.17/km^{2})
- Time zone: UTC+0 (GMT 0)

Bieha is a department or commune of Sissili Province in southern Burkina Faso. Its capital lies at the town of Bieha.

== Towns and villages ==
- Beniou
- Bieha
- Boala
- Bori
- Danfouna
- Diantiogo
- Fien
- Kakouna
- Kontioro
- Konzio
- Koumbo
- Koumbogoro
- Kounou
- Lena
- Levara
- Nabore
- Nakoayaro
- Nebbou
- Nissibi
- Pissie
- Pra
- Prata
- Saboue
- Sia
- Tassien
- Vrou
- Wiri
- Yale
- Yelbouga
