= Castel Camponeschi =

Middle Ages castle in Abruzzo, Italy

Coordinates: 42.2700°N 13.6184°E

Camponeschi Castle
- Castel Camponeschi
- Prata d'Ansidonia
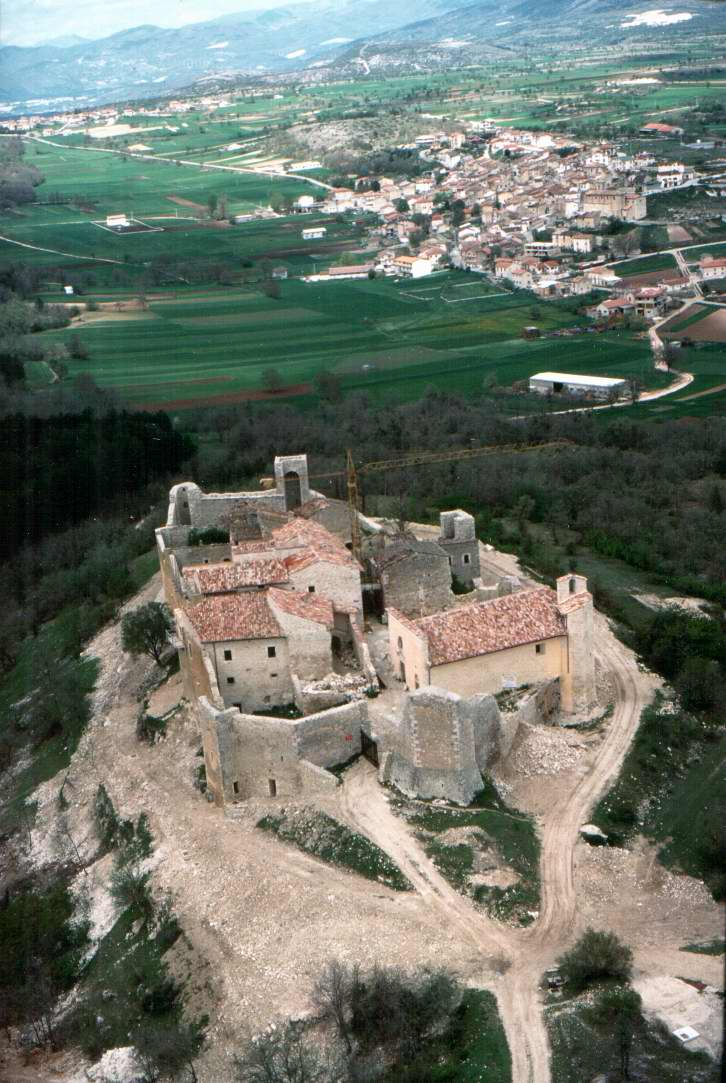
- Castle in Prata d'Ansidonia

Site information
- Type: Castle

Location
- Location within Italy

Site history
- Built: 13th century

Castel Camponeschi (Italian for Camponeschi Castle) is a Middle Ages castle in Prata d'Ansidonia, Province of L'Aquila (Abruzzo).

== History ==
The village was built starting from the 13th century, undergoing modifications in the 15th century, and represented the original castrum of Prata. It was first mentioned in 1508 as "Castrum S. Petri Camponeschi." Tradition holds that the village was constructed at the time of the building of the San Paolo di Peltuinum Church, and that the fief subsequently passed into the hands of the noble Camponeschi family from L'Aquila. After various changes in ownership during the Spanish era, the castle became a fief of the Nardis family from 1634 until 1806, the year of the abolition of feudalism.

It remained inhabited until 1963, when the last family moved to Prata. From 2003 to 2008, it underwent significant restoration work, which was interrupted by the 2009 L'Aquila earthquake and never resumed. Thanks to a partnership between the municipality of Prata d'Ansidonia and the Regional Council of Abruzzo, new recovery work aimed at completing the restoration began in January 2023, financed with funds from the National Recovery and Resilience Plan.

== Architecture ==
The structure consists of a rectangular wall with remnants of towers, connected to houses and palaces. The two medieval gates providing access to the cardo and the decumanus are perfectly preserved. The west gate is additionally flanked by a large tower cut in half and a church, now deconsecrated, dedicated to Saint Peter. Castel Camponeschi is similar to the Tuscan model of Monteriggioni, where the houses are completely detached from the walls. The walls retain traces of six perimeter towers with a quadrangular plan. After the 2009 earthquake, the recovery work on the village and the castle was interrupted and never resumed, so the village is half restored while the other half remains in ruins and in need of further restoration work, which had not yet begun as of 2020.

Church of Saint Peter

The style is late Romanesque medieval: the façade is stone with a horizontal crowning, square-shaped, in the typical style of L'Aquila; it has two portals and two small rose windows, one portal is Renaissance with a stone architrave and a triangular pediment; an oculus is aligned at the center of the façade. The interior is divided into two naves with stone pillars and round arches; there are chapels with altars in a Mannerist tabernacle style of Greek classical design, and the bell tower is incorporated into one of the towers, ending in a gabled form, the result of a makeshift reconstruction.

West access gate

The gate is perfectly preserved and has a classic Gothic pointed arch appearance, flanked by an irregular pentagonal tower.

Noble palace

The internal village consists of small rural houses of one room, and two more complex buildings: the noble palaces. The palace structure is medieval and made of masonry, with the typical style of the 15th century.

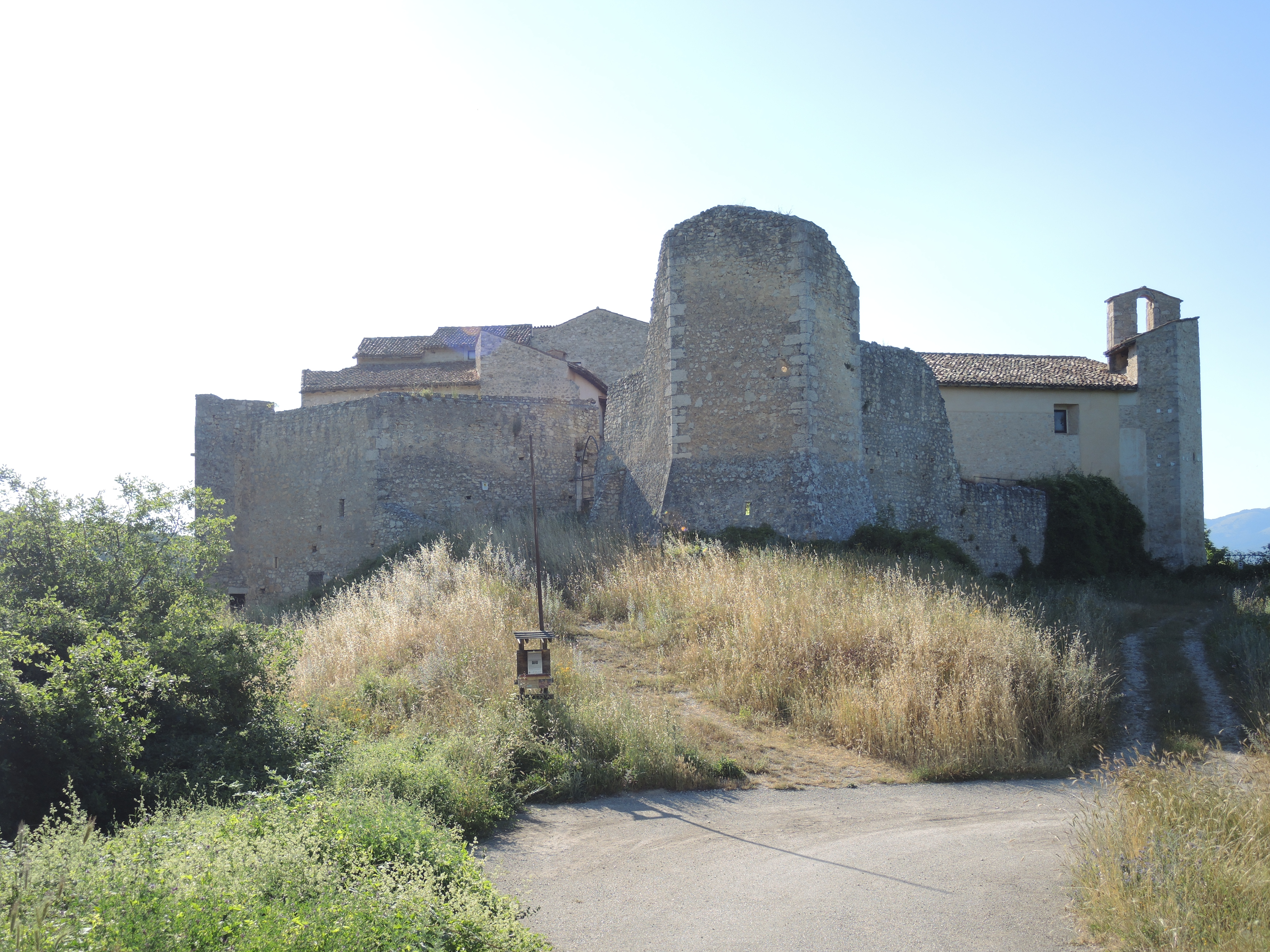
Overview of the village from the west entrance

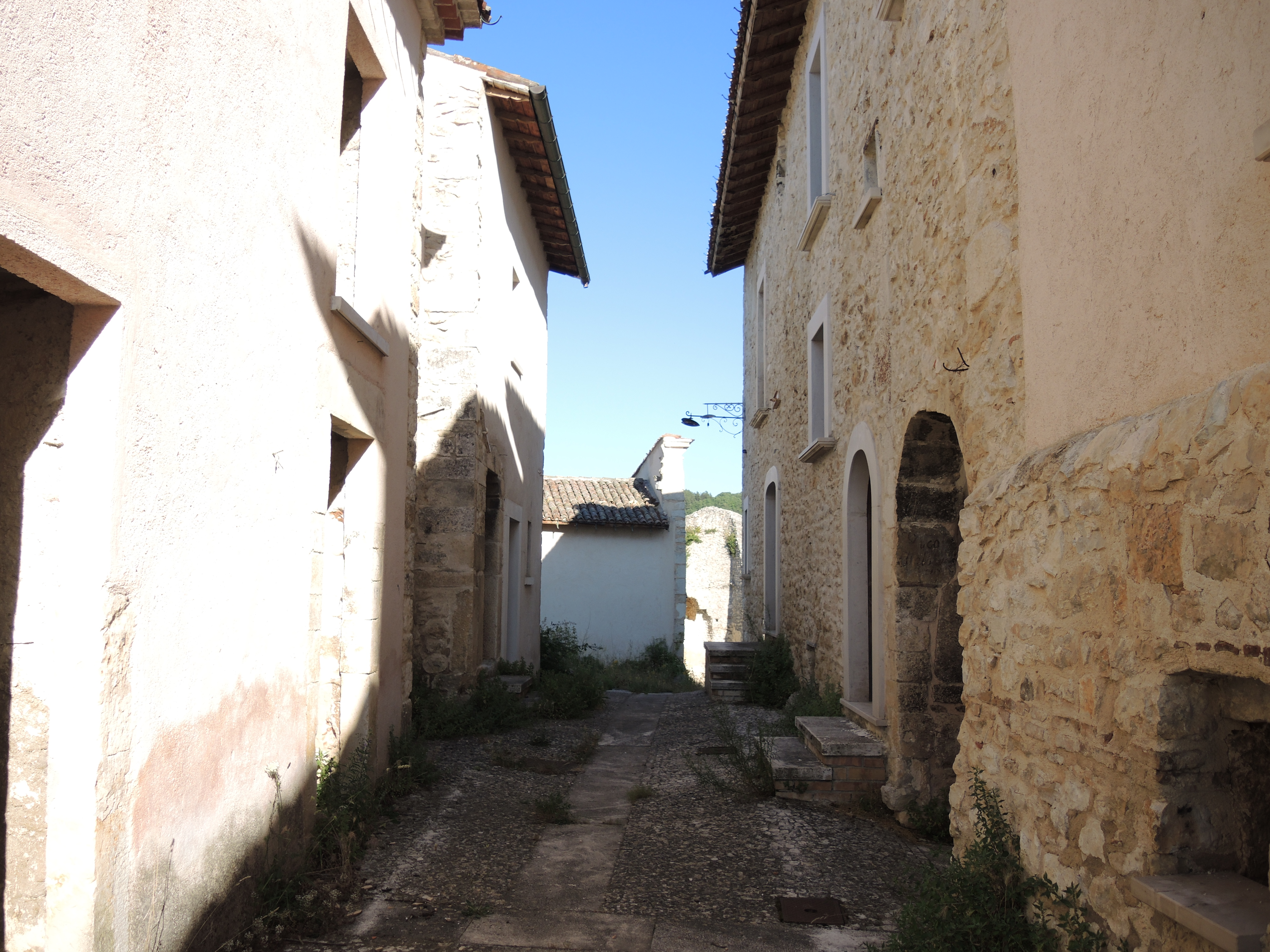
Houses on via Camponeschi

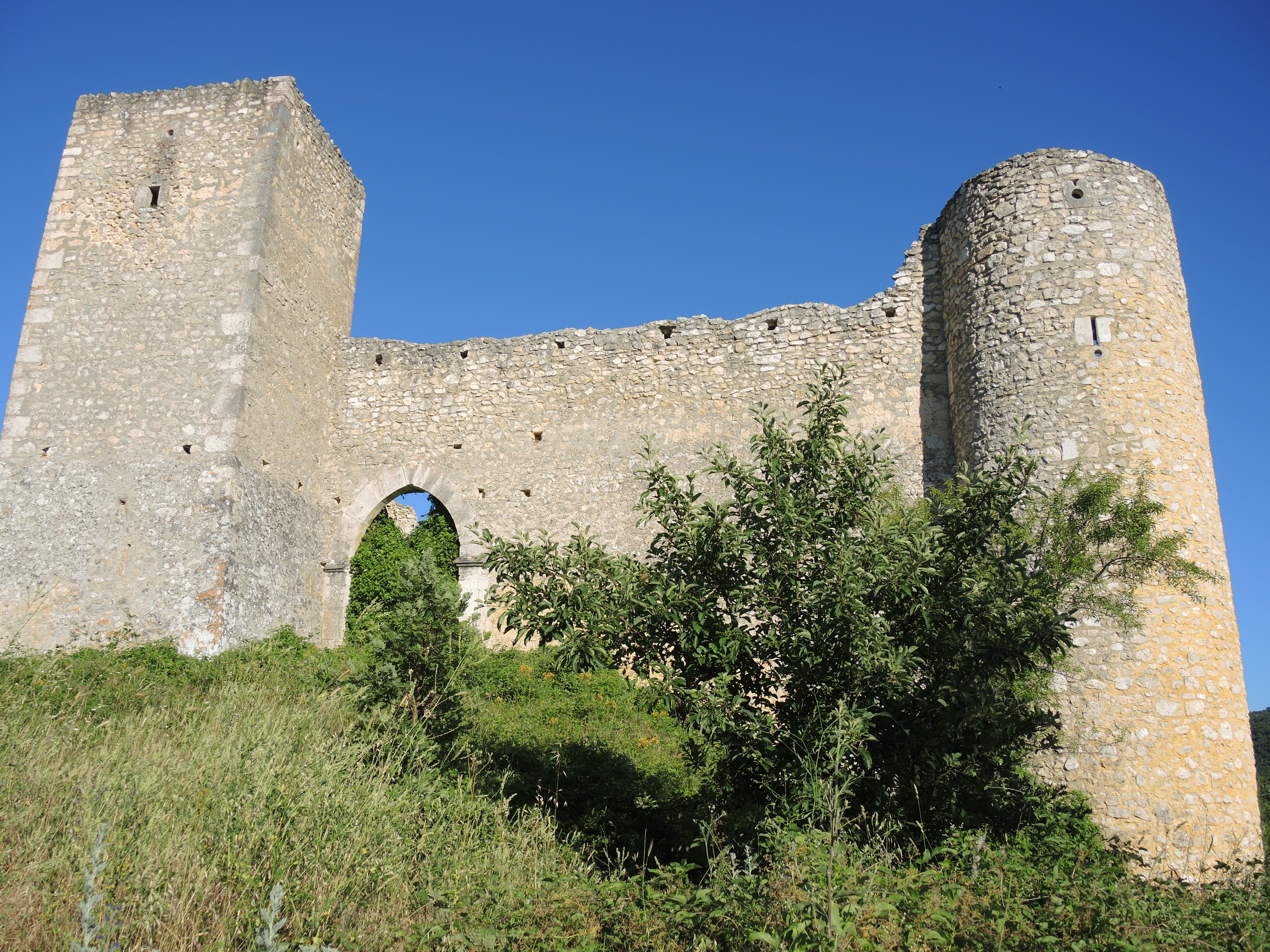
Walls, tower, and Gothic gate on via Camponeschi

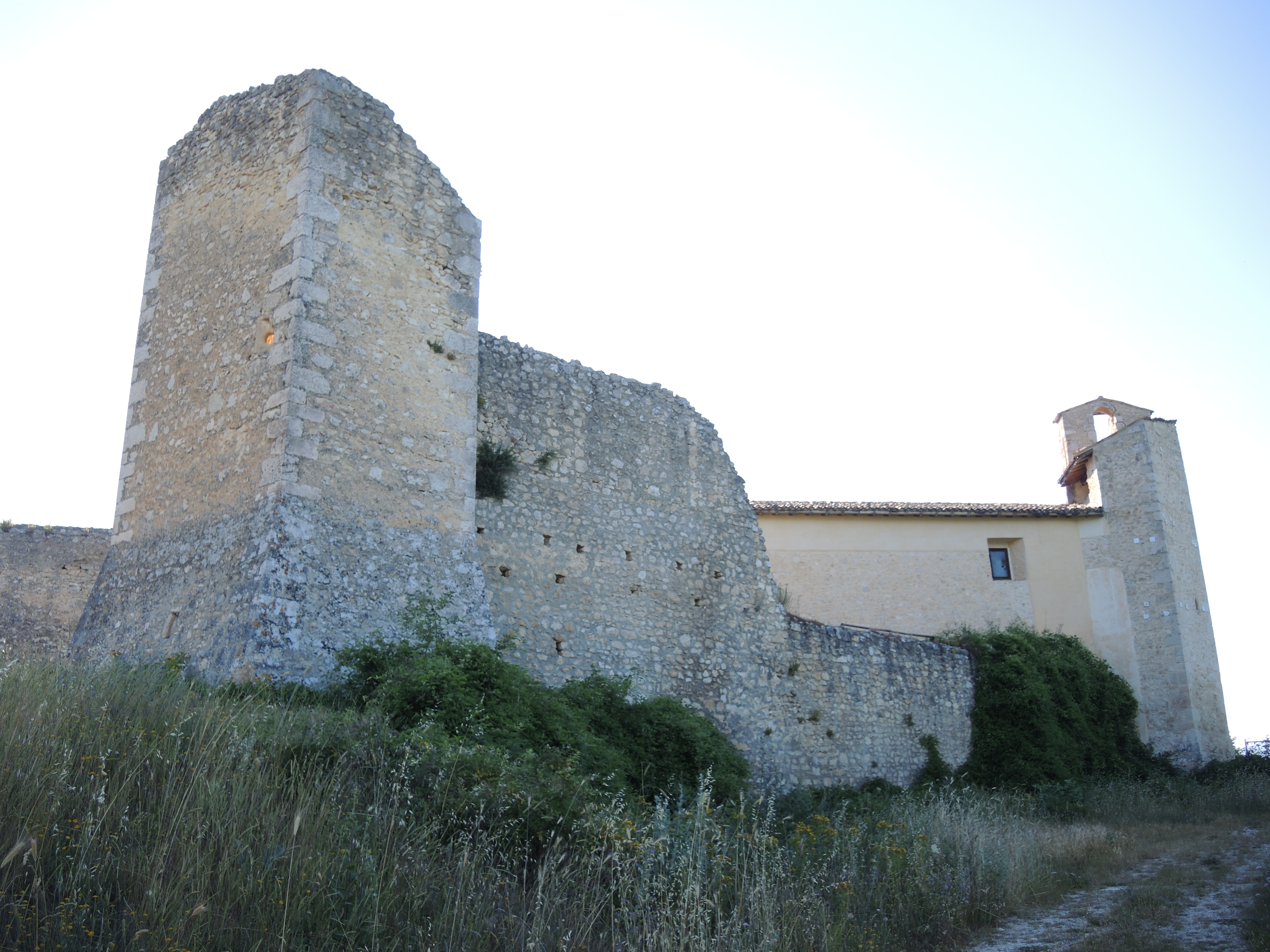
Tower and church

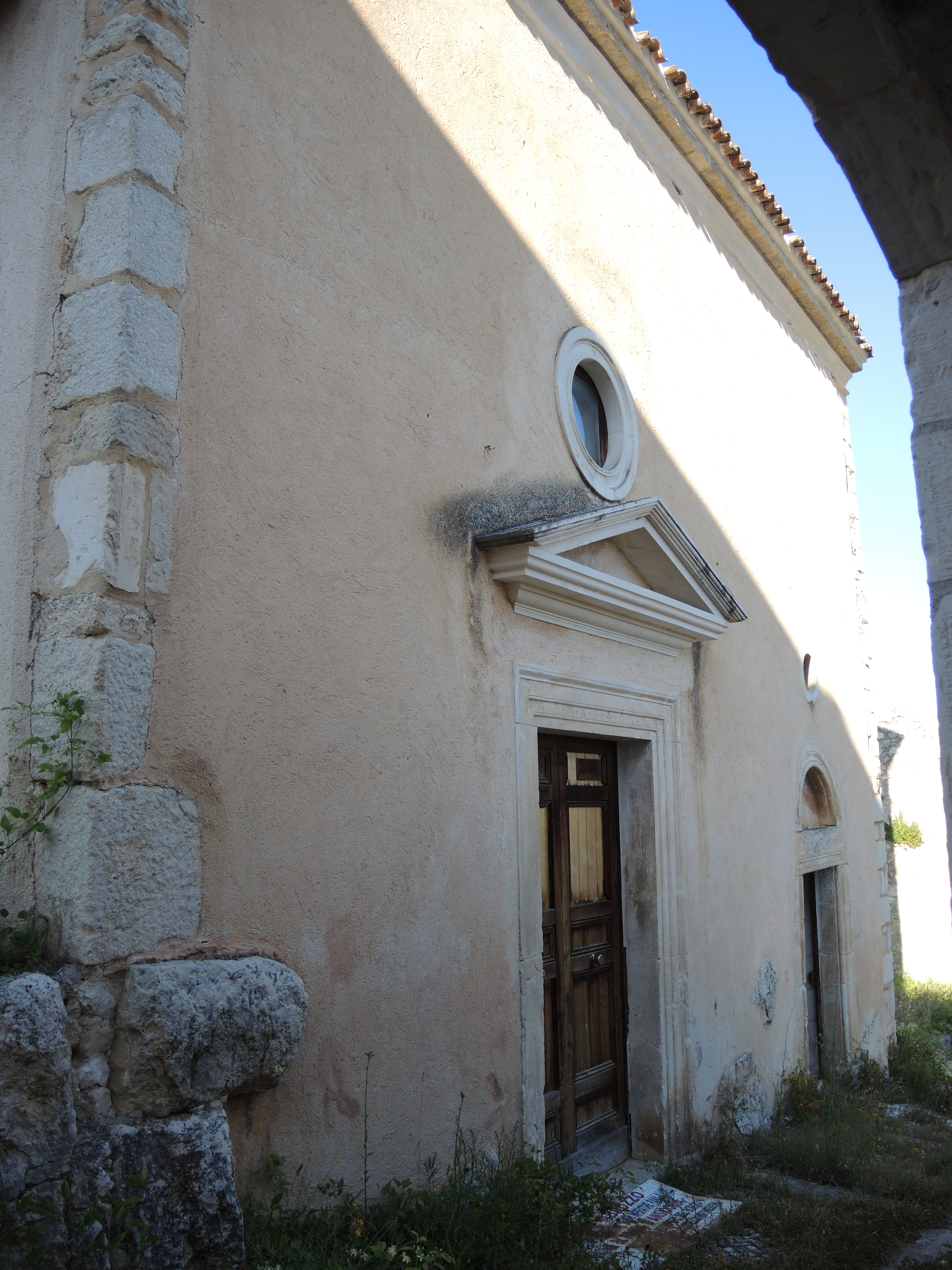
Church of Saint Peter

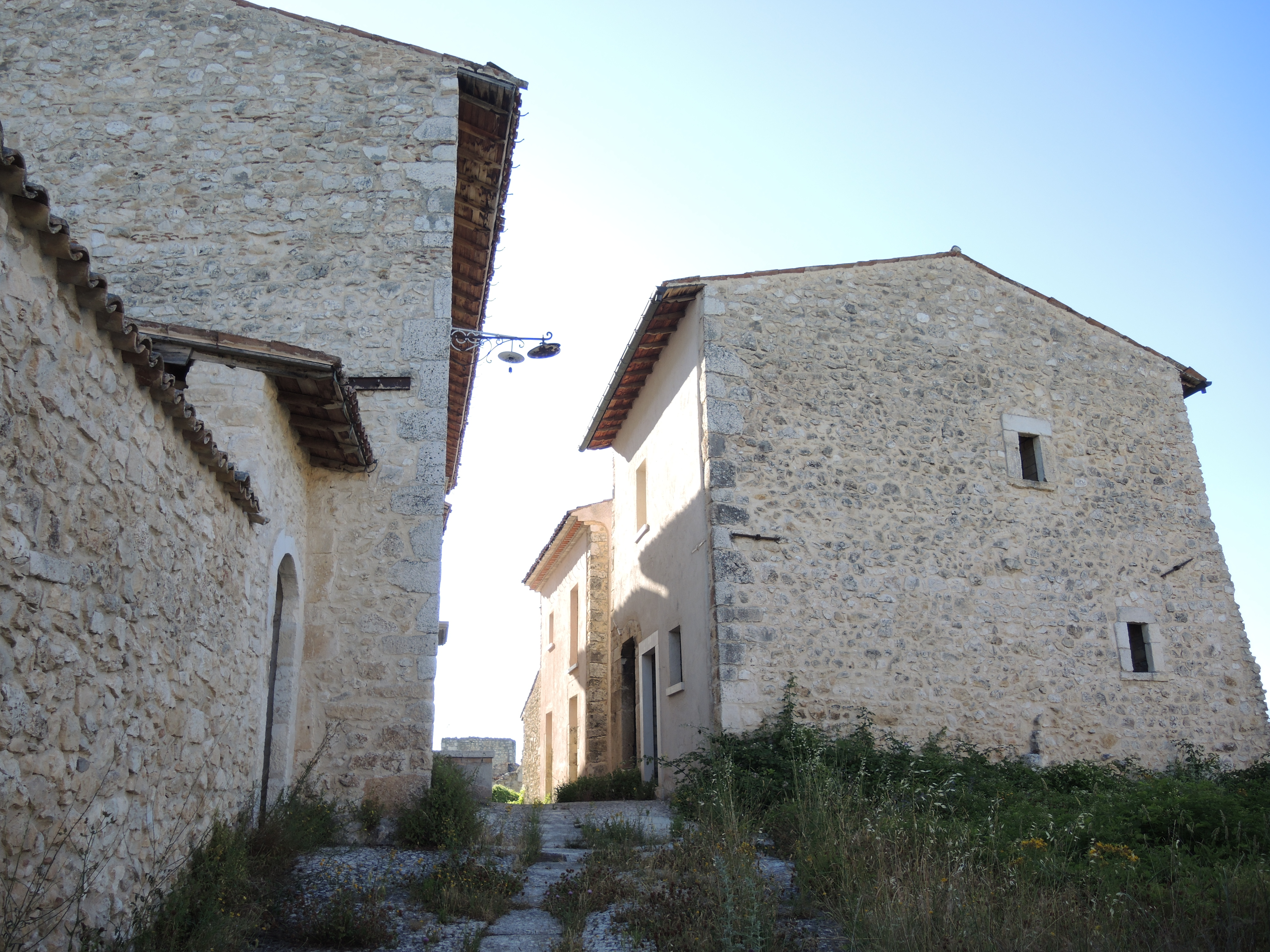
Houses inside the village

Internal village

The internal houses are very simple, made of masonry, and are connected by arches; a street cuts through the village from the western Gothic gate: via Camponeschi, passing through the church square; the rear part of the church is reinforced by the walls, with a tower transformed into a bell tower.
