= Nébiélianayou Department =

Coordinates: 11°54′N 2°22′W

Nebielianayou
- Department
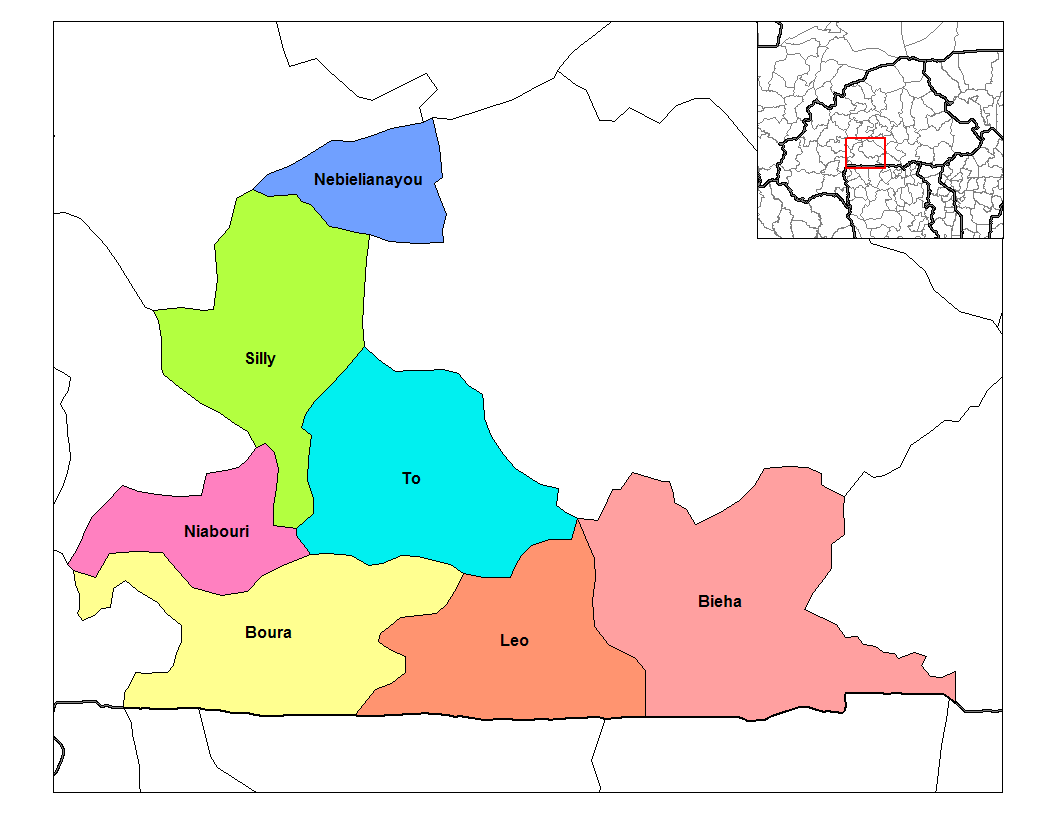
- Nebielianayou Department location in the province
- Country: Burkina Faso
- Province: Sissili Province

Area
  - Total: 158.1 sq mi (409.4 km^{2})

Population (2019 census)
  - Total: 13,137
  - Density: 83.11/sq mi (32.09/km^{2})
- Time zone: UTC+0 (GMT 0)

Nebielianayou is a department or commune of Sissili Province in southern Burkina Faso. Its capital lies at the town of Nebielianayou.
