= Silly Department =

Department in Sissili Province, Burkina Faso

Coordinates: 11.6°N 2.5°W

Silly
- Department
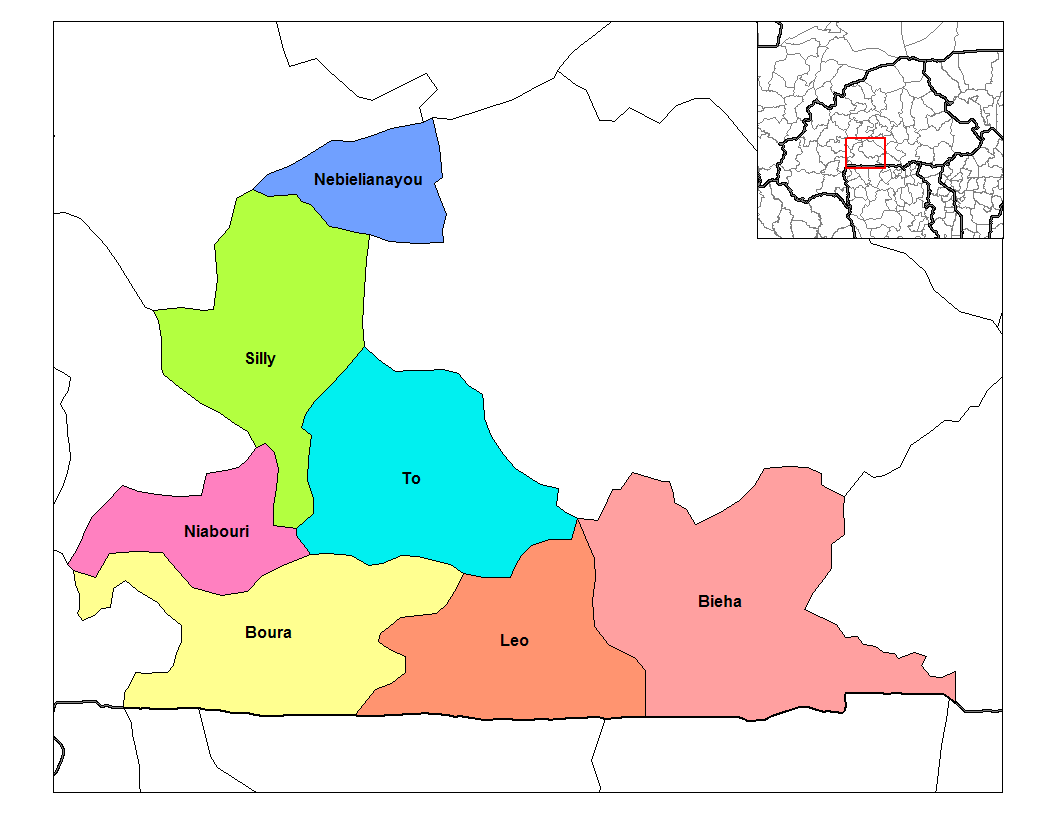
- Silly Department location in Sissili Province
- Country: Burkina Faso
- Province: Sissili Province
- Time zone: UTC+0 (GMT 0)

Silly is a department or commune of Sissili Province in southern Burkina Faso. Its capital lies at the town of Silly.
