= Niabouri Department =

Coordinates: 11°16′N 2°38′W

Niabouri
- Department
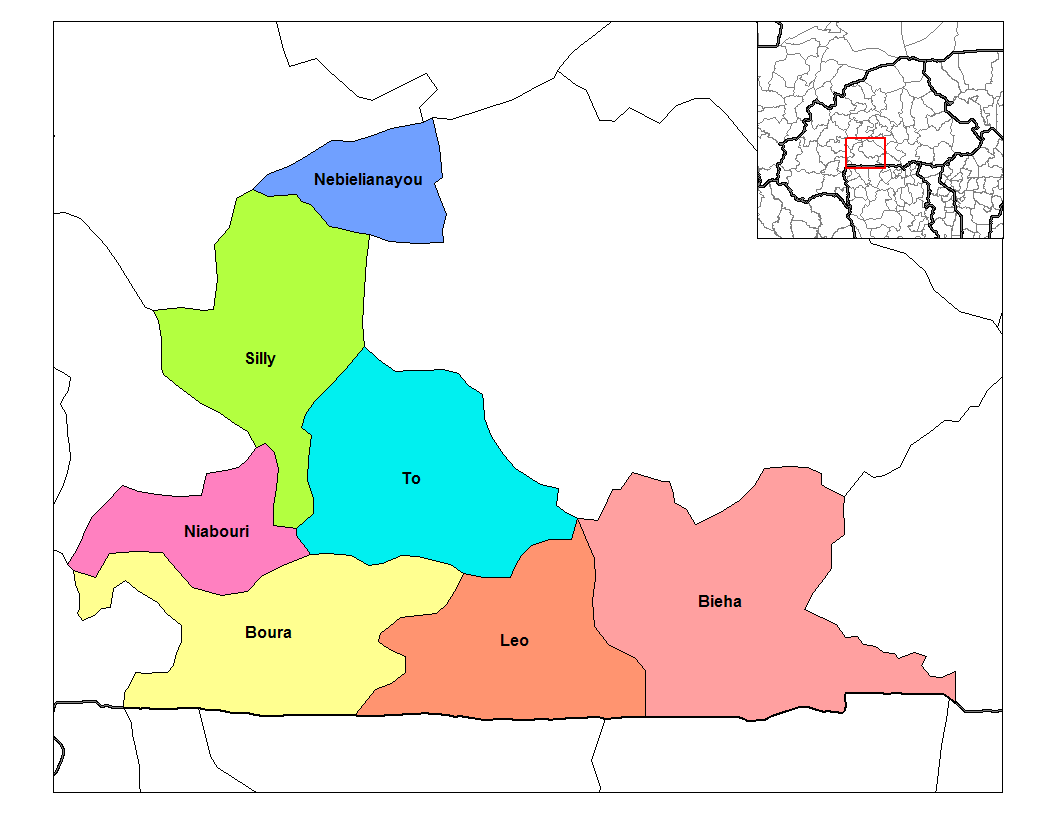
- Niabouri Department location in the province
- Country: Burkina Faso
- Province: Sissili Province

Area
  - Total: 202.0 sq mi (523.2 km^{2})

Population (2019 census)
  - Total: 30,371
  - Density: 150.3/sq mi (58.05/km^{2})
- Time zone: UTC+0 (GMT 0)

Niabouri is a department or commune of Sissili Province in southern Burkina Faso. Its capital lies at the town of Niabouri.
