= Prata d'Ansidonia =

- Comune
- Comune di Prata d'Ansidonia
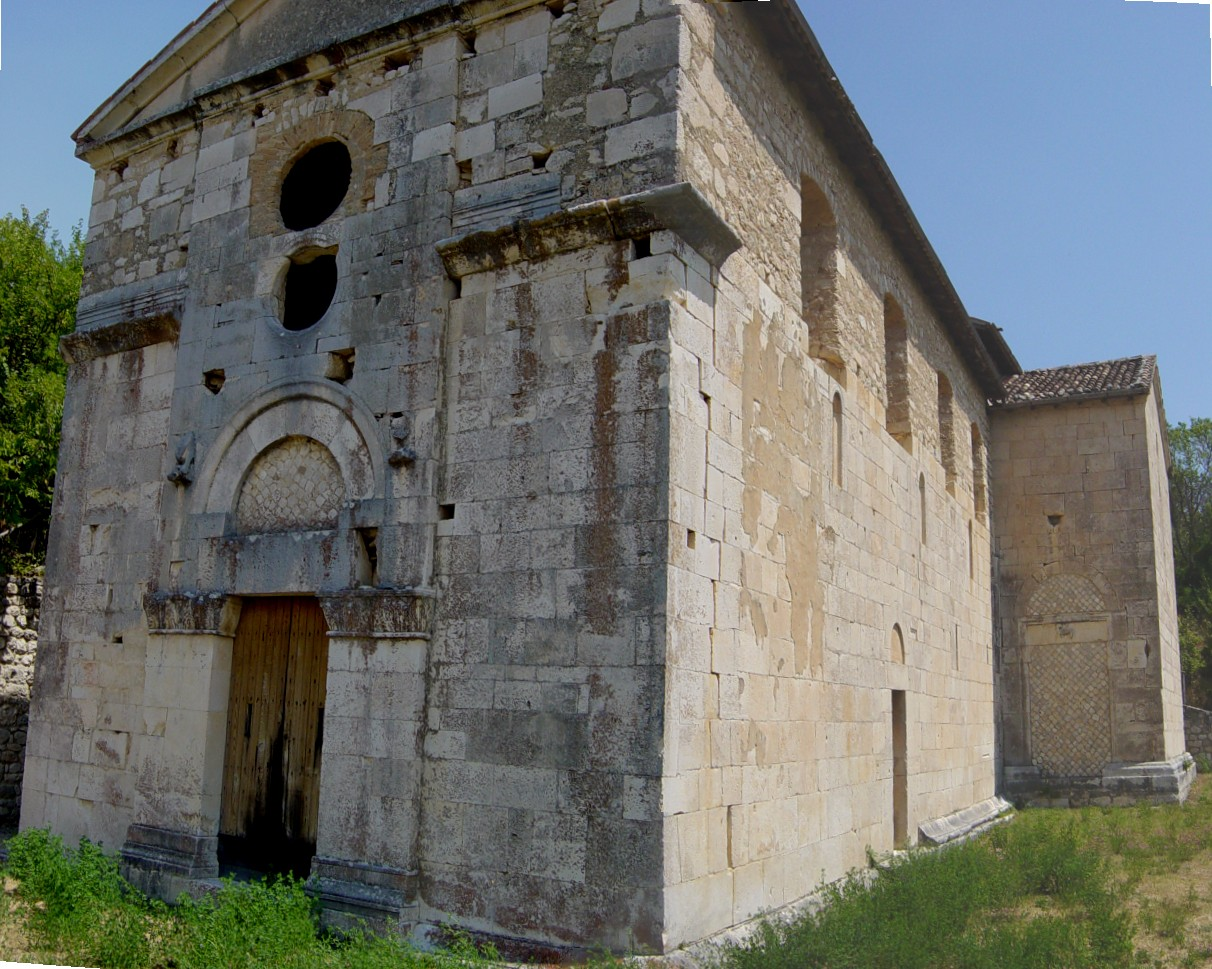
- Church of San Paolo.

- Coat of arms

- Location within Italy Location within Abruzzo
- Coordinates: 42°16′44″N 13°36′33″E
- Country: Italy
- Region: Abruzzo
- Province: L'Aquila (AQ)
- Frazioni: San Nicandro, Tussio

Government
  - Mayor: Paolo Eusani

Area
  - Total: 19.64 km^{2} (7.58 sq mi)
- Elevation: 846 m (2,776 ft)

Population (31 December 2010)
  - Total: 533
  - Density: 27.1/km^{2} (70.3/sq mi)
- Demonym: Pratesi
- Time zone: UTC+1 (CET)
  - Summer (DST): UTC+2 (CEST)
- Postal code: 67020
- Dialing code: 0862
- Patron saint: St. Nicholas of Bari
- Saint day: December 6
- Website: Official website

Prata d'Ansidonia is a comune and town in the province of L'Aquila, in the Abruzzo region of central Italy.

== See also ==
- Castel Camponeschi
- Peltuinum
