= Prato (cookbook) =

Austrian cookbook

Prato is the common name for a traditional Austrian cookbook first published in 1858 by Katharina Prato (1818–97, born Polt) as The South German Cuisine. It became popular under the name The Large Prato (Die grosse Prato) and appeared in 80 editions as well as several translations until 1957. The 76th and 77th editions were 1048 pages whereas the original 1858 edition was only 348 pages. In 1931 V. Leitmaier, the granddaughter of the author, published a shortened version called The Small Prato (Die kleine Prato). the 1931 first edition of The Small Prato had 466 numbered pages, plus 24 preliminary pages for 490 pages total.
