= Katharina Prato =

Austrian cookbook writer

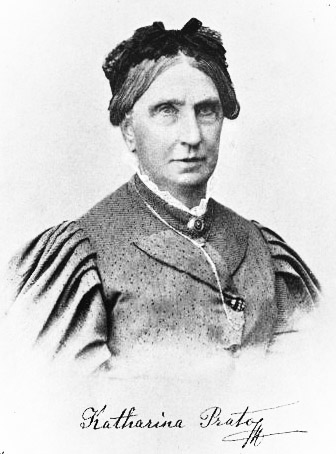
Katharina Prato

Katharina Prato, full name Katharina Pratobevera, née Polt (1818–1897), was an Austrian cookbook writer. In 1858, she published Die süddeutsche Küche which became enormously popular for decades, reaching an 80th edition in 1957.

== Biography ==
Born on 26 February 1818 in Graz, she was the daughter of Franz Polt, a gentleman of private means. As a member of a well-to-do family, in addition to housekeeping, she learnt to speak French and to play the piano. In 1857, she married Eduard Pratobevera, a retired officer and historian who suffered from a serious stomach ailment. Despite her careful attention to his dietary needs, he died on 18 December the same year. The recipes she recorded during her husband's illness were the beginning of a larger collection which she published in 1858 as Die süddeutsche Küche (South-German Cooking).

In 1861, she married Johann von Scheiger, a former friend of her first husband, who was postal director of the provinces of Styria and Carinthia. Accompanying him on his numerous business trips, she collected recipes from the restaurants and households they visited, including them in later editions of her cookbook. Her recipes were not addressed to professional housekeepers and cooks but rather to housewives who prepared meals themselves. As a result, the work became far more widely used than existing cookbooks, which were not written as guides of practice. Later editions of the work were carefully revised and expanded, metric measures being included throughout.

In addition to expanded editions of her cookbook, in 1873 Prato published Austria's first comprehensive housekeeping guide, Die Haushaltungskunde. Ein Leitfaden für Frauen und Mädchen aller Stände. Mit Anwendung des metrischen Maßes und Gewichtes (Housekeeping. A Guide for Women and Girls of All Backgrounds. With Metric Measures and Weights). The work describes a wide variety of activities in the home and garden for both servants and housewives, with advice on food, service, clothing, laundry, child care, health care, gardening and even pets.

Prato founded the Verein Volksküche in Graz, a kind of soup kitchen association, and supported women's retirement accommodation, girls' schools and kindergartens. She died in Graz on 23 September 1897.

== See also ==
- List of Austrian writers
