= Sissili Province =

Sissili
- Province
- Location in Burkina Faso

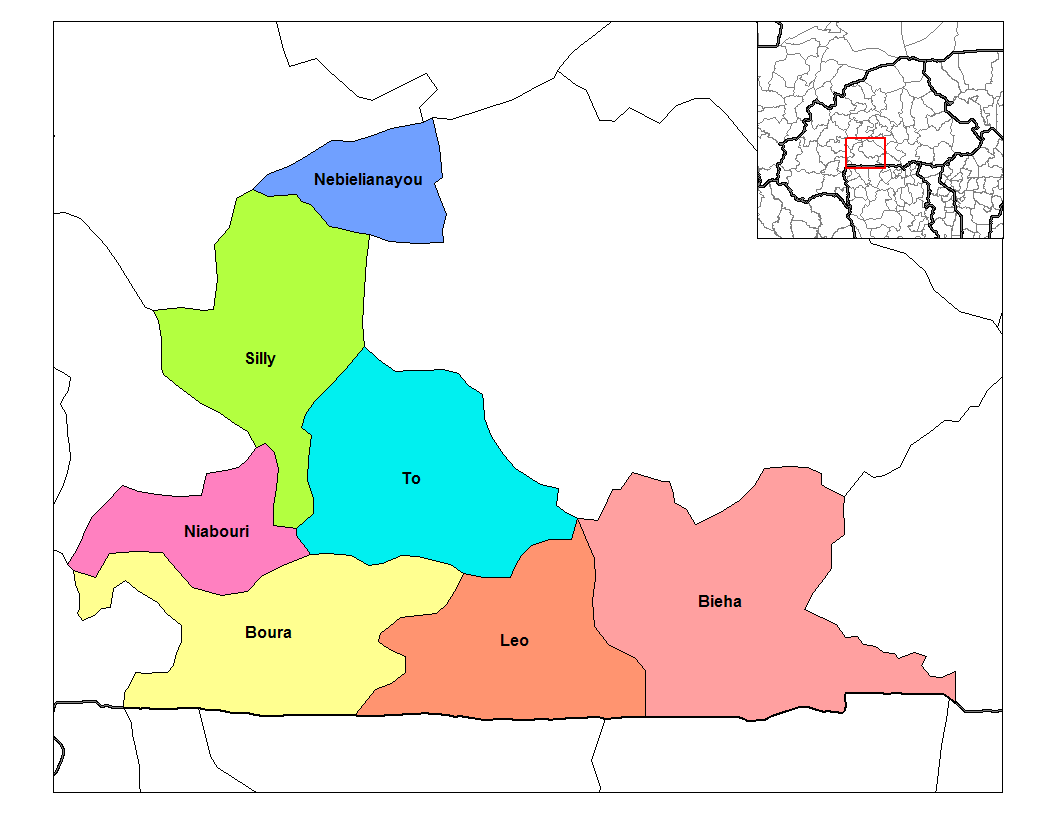
- Provincial map of its departments
- Coordinates: 11°20′N 2°15′E
- Country: Burkina Faso
- Region: Centre-Ouest Region
- Capital: Léo

Area
  - Province: 7,147 km^{2} (2,759 sq mi)

Population (2019 census)
  - Province: 336,972
  - Density: 47.15/km^{2} (122.1/sq mi)
  - Urban: 51,743
- Time zone: UTC+0 (GMT 0)
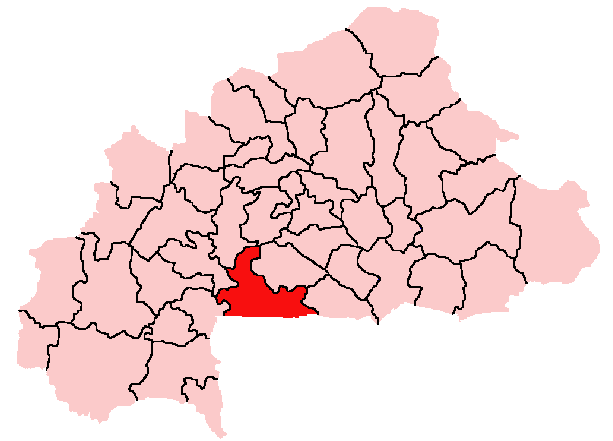
- Location of Sissili Province in Burkina Faso

Sissili is one of the 45 provinces of Burkina Faso, located in its Centre-Ouest Region. In 2006 the population was 212,628 and in 2011 the population was 240,830, an increase of 13.3%.

Its capital is Léo.

== Education ==
In 2011 the province had 194 primary schools and 18 secondary schools.

== Healthcare ==
In 2011 the province had 31 health and social promotion centers (Centres de santé et de promotion sociale), 3 doctors and 65 nurses.

== Departments ==
Sissili is divided into 7 departments:

Department	Capital	Population (Census 2006)
Bieha Department	Bieha	29,859
Boura Department	Boura	24,574
Léo Department	Léo	50,378
Nebielianayou Department	Nebielianayou	7,733
Niabouri Department	Niabouri	19,068
Silly Department	Silly	33,350
To Department	To	47,666

== See also ==
- Regions of Burkina Faso
- Provinces of Burkina Faso
- Departments of Burkina Faso
