= List of cities in Burkina Faso =

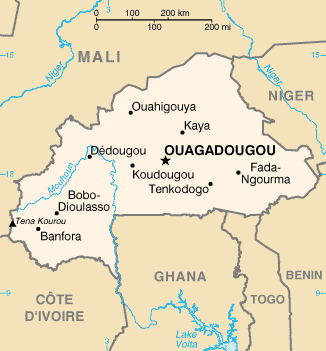
Map of Burkina Faso

This is a list of cities and towns in Burkina Faso.

== List of cities by population ==
Bold indicates the city being the capital of its province and/or region.

Rank	City	2019 Census	2012 Estimate	Province	Region
1	Ouagadougou	2,453,496	1,626,951	**Kadiogo**	**Centre**
2	Bobo-Dioulasso	984,603	537,728	**Houet**	**Hauts-Bassins**
3	Koudougou	160,239	91,981	**Boulkiemdé**	**Centre-Ouest**
4	Ouahigouya	124,587	86,569	**Yatenga**	**Nord**
5	Kaya	121,970	66,851	**Sanmatenga**	**Centre-Nord**
6	Banfora	117,452	93,750	**Comoé**	**Cascades**
7	Pouytenga	96,469	60,618	**Kouritenga**	**Centre-Est**
8	Houndé	87,151	47,428	**Tuy**	**Hauts-Bassins**
9	Fada N'Gourma	73,200	51,421	**Gourma**	**Est**
10	Dédougou	63,617	42,542	**Mouhoun**	**Boucle du Mouhoun**
11	Djibo	61,462	28,990	**Soum**	Sahel
12	Tenkodogo	61,936	48,539	**Boulgou**	**Centre-Est**
13	Kongoussi	53,641	25,172	**Bam**	Centre-Nord
14	Léo	51,746	26,779	**Sissili**	Centre-Ouest
15	Koupéla	49,372	22,761	**Kouritenga**	Centre-Est
16	Titao	48,241	22,854	**Loroum**	Nord
17	Dori	46,512	-	**Séno**	**Sahel**
18	Gaoua	45,284	30,931	**Poni**	**Sud-Ouest**
19	Garango	45,150	63,527	Boulgou	Centre-Est
20	Gourcy	40,141	30,565	**Zondoma**	Nord
21	Yako	38,679	24,076	**Passoré**	Nord
22	Zorgho	35,398	21,518	**Ganzourgou**	Plateau-Central
23	Réo	33,894	31,174	**Sanguié**	Centre-Ouest
24	Orodara	33,422	21,741	**Kénédougou**	Hauts-Bassins
25	Ziniaré	33,296	22,220	**Oubritenga**	**Plateau-Central**
26	Niangoloko	33,292	26,088	Comoé	Cascades
27	Nouna	32,428	-	**Kossi**	Boucle du Mouhoun
28	Bittou	31,210	-	Boulgou	Centre-Est
29	Kombissiri	28,617	28,079	**Bazèga**	Centre-Sud
30	Manga	28,615	22,943	**Zoundwéogo**	**Centre-Sud**

== Alphabetical list ==
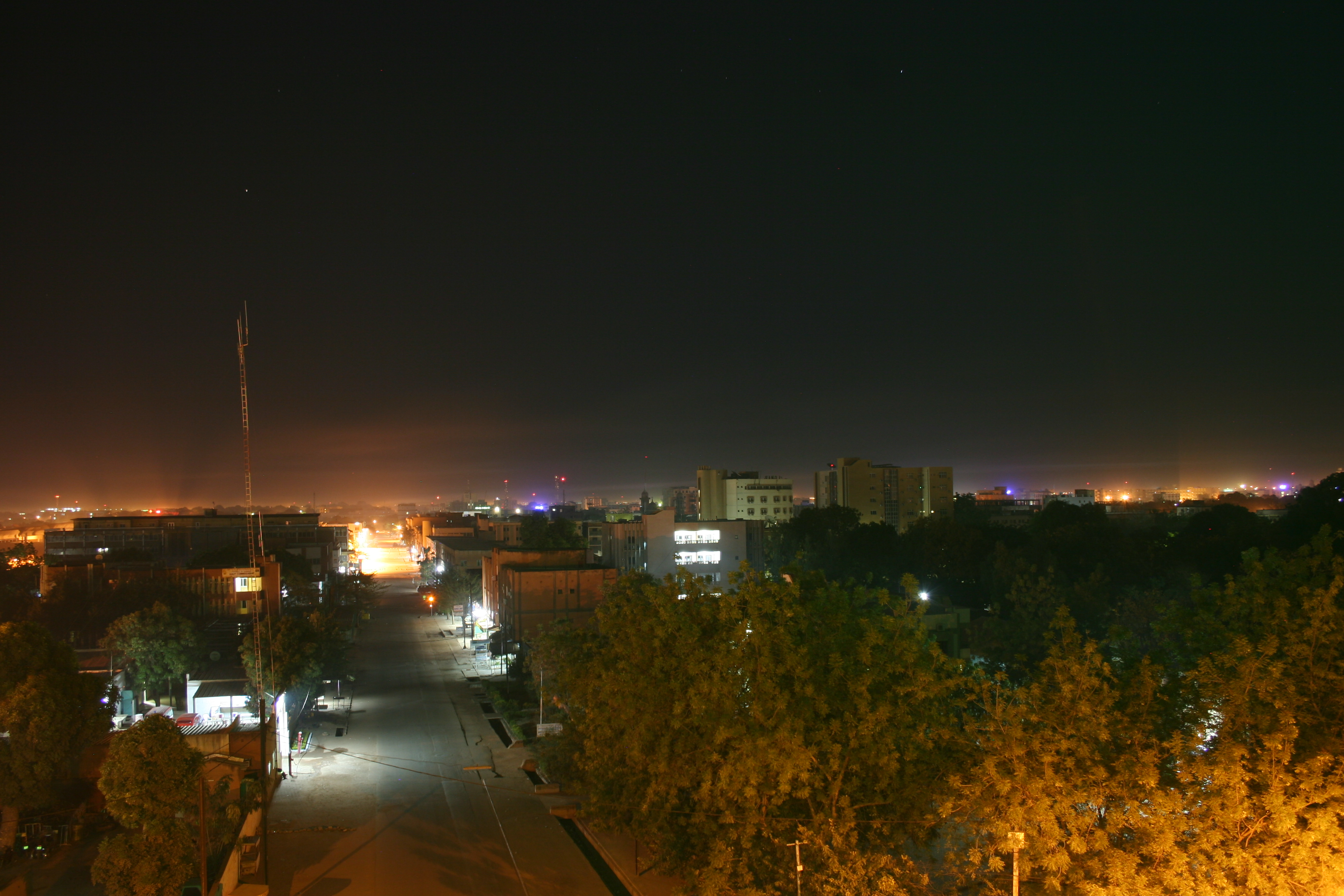
Ouagadougou, Capital of Burkina Faso

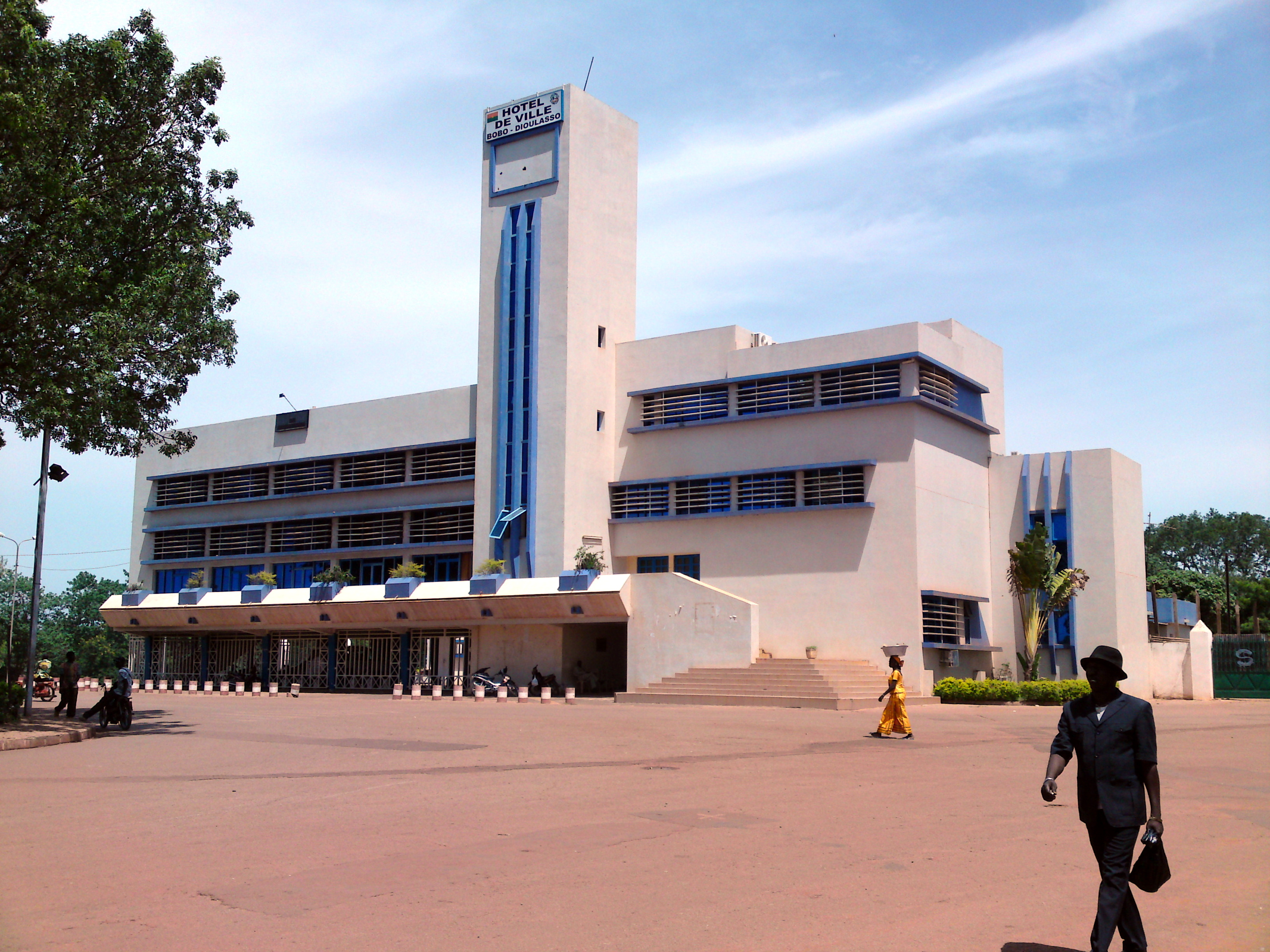
Bobo-Dioulasso, the 2nd largest city.

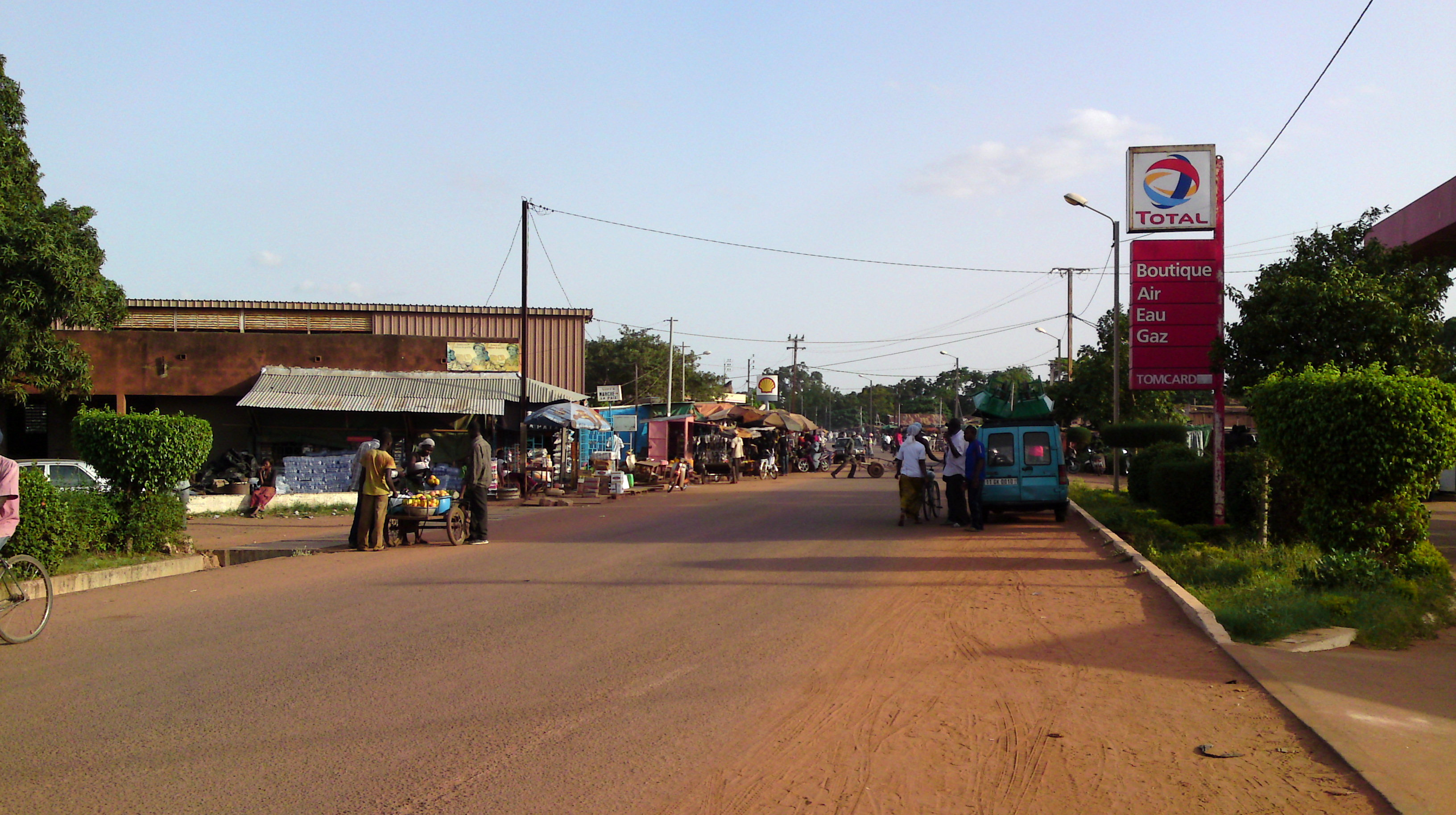
Banfora

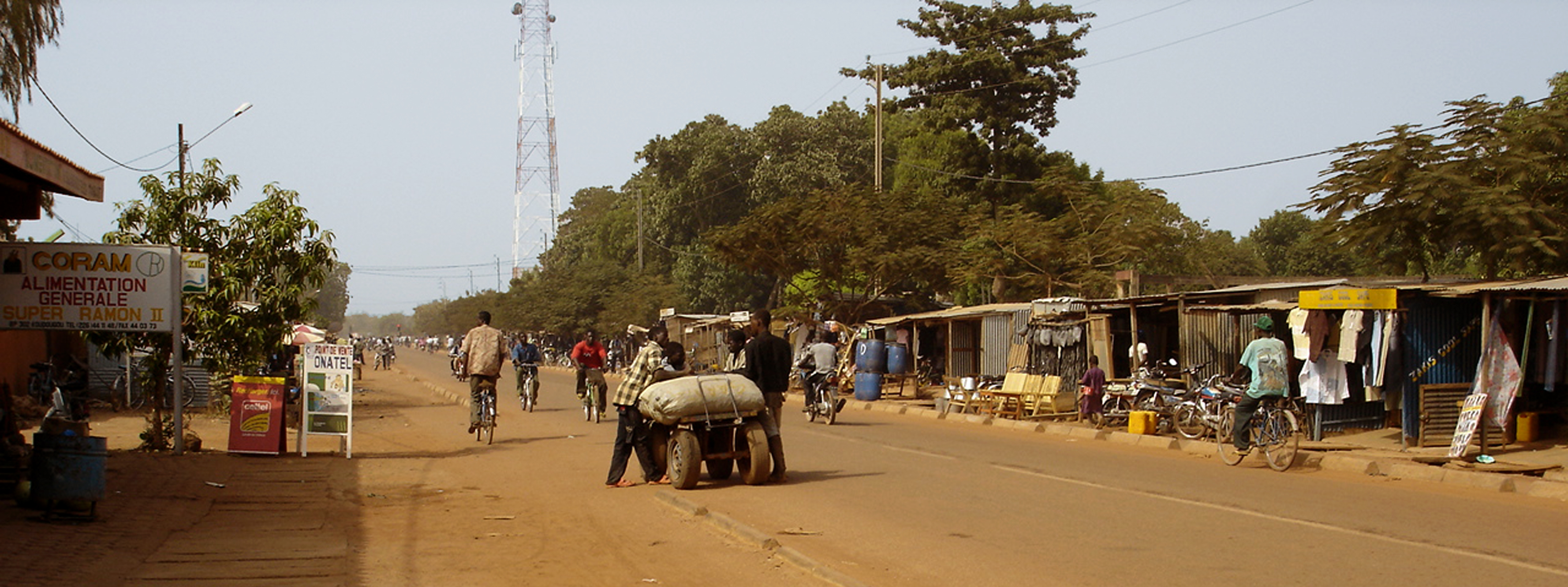
Koudougou

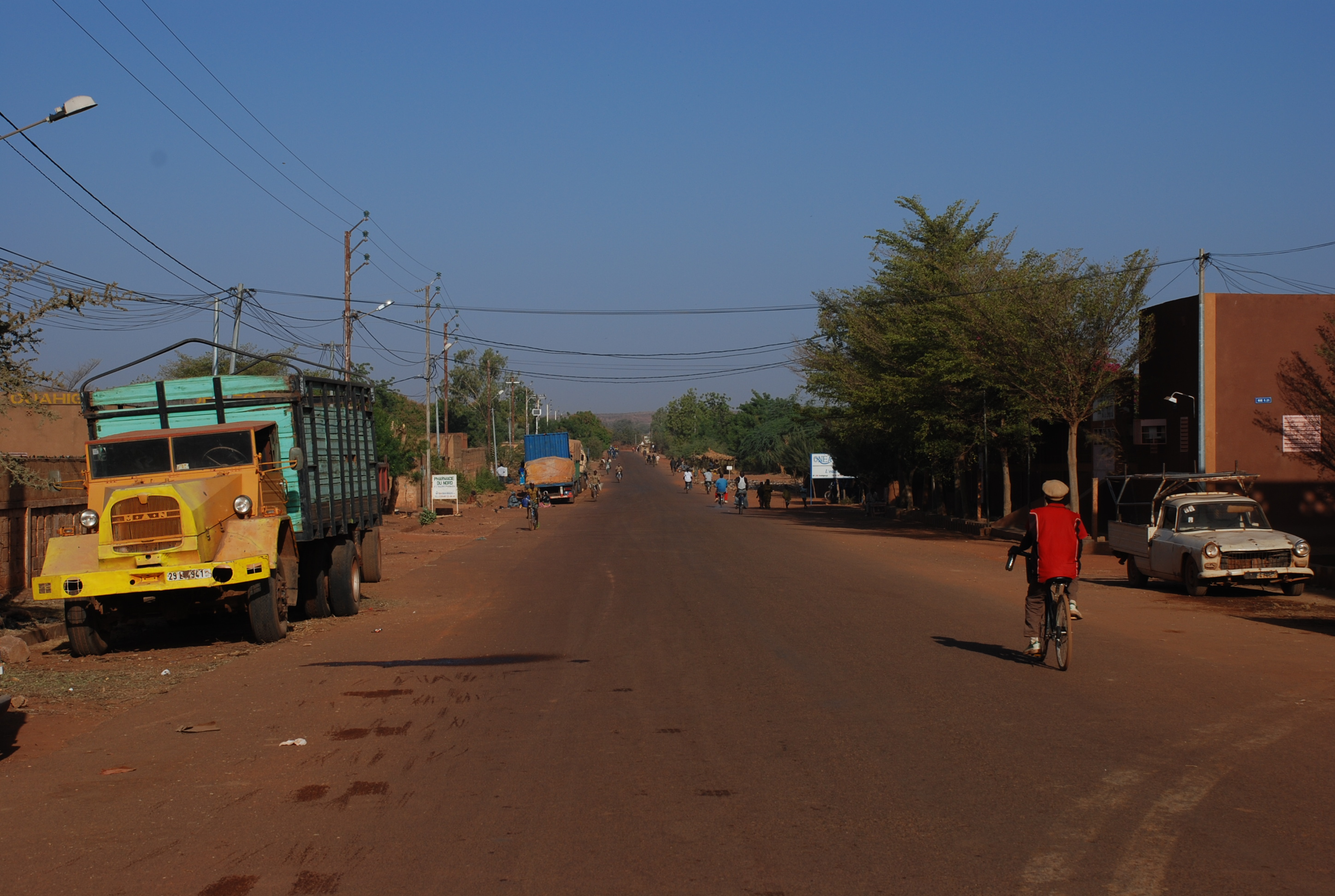
Ouahigouya

- Abanga
- Abaye
- Aribinda
- Babakou
- Bagré
- Bagzan
- Balkuy
- Bangma
- Banga, Burkina Faso
- Banfora
- Bangaba
- Bangataka
- Baniaba
- Barogo
- Bassemkoukouri
- Bassemyam
- Batié
- Bendogo
- Bilbalogo
- Bittou
- Bobo Dioulasso
- Boéna
- Bogandé
- Bondigui
- Boromo
- Boulsa
- Boudry-Peulh
- Bourma
- Bourma
- Bourma de Zoaga
- Boussé
- Cissin
- Dano
- Dabaré
- Dassouri
- Dassouri
- Dédougou
- Diabatou
- Diapaga
- Diarabakoko
- Diébougou
- Djibo
- Dikomtinga
- Dinkabara
- Dori
- Douré
- Douré
- Douré
- Douré
- Douré
- Douré
- Doure
- Dwaba
- Fada N'gourma
- Feto Kabaradje
- Foulgo
- Foulgo
- Gaoua
- Gampéla
- Gantin
- Garango
- Gayéri
- Gbomblora
- Goa
- Goabga
- Gondré
- Gon
- Gorom-Gorom
- Gouingo
- Gouin-Gouin
- Gouindougouni
- Gouindougouba
- Gounghin
- Goupana
- Gourcy
- Haba
- Houndé
- Ibogo
- Ibogo
- Kabala
- Kaba
- Kabaro
- Kampti
- Kankalaba
- Kantchari
- Karankasso
- Karpala
- Katabtenga
- Kaya
- Kindi
- Koankin
- Koankin
- Koankin
- Konkin Foulgo
- Konkin Moogo
- Kobo
- Kokologo
- Kombissiri
- Kongoussi
- Kordié
- Kossodo
- Kostenga
- Kostenga
- Kouba
- Kouidi
- Koudougou
- Kouka, Bam
- Kouka, Banwa
- Koupéla
- Lalma
- Lelkom
- Léo
- Liguidmalguéma
- Limsèga
- Loropeni
- Louksi
- Malioma
- Manéssé
- Manga
- Méguet
- Moétenga
- Mogtedo
- Nabasnonghin
- Nabmalguéma
- Nabinkinsma
- Nabiraogtenga
- Nadiagou
- Nanom
- Nadioutenga
- Nakomtenga
- Nédogo-Peulh
- Nédogo
- Niangoloko
- Nobsin
- Nouna
- Orodara
- Ouagadougou (capital)
- Ouahigouya
- Ouaongtenga
- Ouargaye
- Paglayiri
- Pama
- Pamnonghin
- Pamno Ouidi
- Paspanga
- Payamtenga
- Pissila
- Pittyn
- Pô
- Poédogo
- Poédogo
- Poédogo
- Pousghin
- Pousghin
- Pouytenga
- Réo
- Saaba
- Sakoula
- Saponé
- Sapouy
- Samandin
- Sandogo
- Sankouissi
- Sankouissi
- Sankuissi
- Sebba
- Séguénéga
- Silmidougou
- Silmiougou
- Silmiougou
- Silmiougou
- Sindou
- Solenzo
- Somgandé
- Songdin
- Songdin
- Tadaryat
- Tallé
- Tampouy
- Tamissi
- Tamissi
- Tanghin-Wobdo
- Tanghin
- Tanghin
- Tanghin
- Tanghin
- Tanghin
- Tanghin
- Tangin Dassouri
- Tankoala
- Tanlouka
- Tansobentinga
- Taonsgo
- Taonsghin
- Taonsogo
- Téonsgo
- Tansèga
- Tansèga
- Tanwaka
- Tenkodogo
- Tikaré
- Tinsalgo
- Tinsouka
- Titao
- Toma
- Tougan
- Toyogdo
- Villy
- Yaïka
- Yako
- Yinsinbingba
- Zaken
- Zambanaga
- Zambanega
- Zanrsin
- Zékounga
- Ziniaré
- Zoangpighin
- Zogona
- Zorgho
- Zorgo
