= Tanghin =

Tanghin (alternatively Tanguen) may refer to several places in Burkina Faso:

Five places in Ganzourgou Province:

- Tanghin, Boudry
- Tanghin, Méguet
- Tanghin, Zoungou
- Two places in the Kogho Department of Ganzourgou Province:
  - Tanghin I
  - Tanghin II

Two places in Bazèga Province:

- Tanghin, Saponé
- Tanghin, Toece

One place in Boulkiemdé Province:

- Tanghin, Boulkiemdé

One place in Kadiogo Province:

- Tanghin, Saaba
