= Pansi attack =

2020 terrorist incident in Burkina Faso

- Part of the Islamist insurgency in Burkina Faso
- Pansi attack (Burkina Faso)
- Location: 13.2323°N 0.8819°E; Pansi, Yagha Province, Sahel Region, Burkina Faso
- Date: 16 February 2020
- Target: Churchgoers
- Attack type: Mass shooting
- Deaths: 24
- Injuries: 18
- Perpetrator: Islamic State in the Greater Sahara (suspected)

On 16 February 2020, unknown jihadists attacked a Protestant service being hosted in the village of Pansi, Burkina Faso, killing 24 civilians and injuring 18 more. No group claimed responsibility for the attack, although the Islamic State in the Greater Sahara is active near Pansi.

== Background ==
Northern Burkina Faso has been a hotbed of jihadist activity since the start of the jihadist insurgency in Burkina Faso. Ansarul Islam, a homegrown jihadist group allied with the al-Qaeda aligned Jama'at Nasr al-Islam wal-Muslimin, is dominant in Soum Province and Boucle du Mouhoun Region, and the Islamic State in the Greater Sahara (ISGS) is dominant near the Nigerien border, including Sahel Region.

On 10 February, jihadists kidnapped seven Catholics from a town in Yagha Province, where Pansi is located, demanding a ransom. Five of the seven hostages were eventually found dead.

== Attack ==
A group of twenty armed gunmen entered Pansi on 16 February. The militants distinguished between residents and non-residents, and subsequently shot at ongoing Protestant church services in the town. Despite the church being the primary target, both Christians and Muslims were killed in the attack. The gunmen took hostages, and forced three of the hostages to transport looted rice and oil from the village on motorbikes.

Many individuals sought medical treatment in the nearby town Sebba after the attack. Other victims were transported by emergency services over 160 kilometres (100 mi) to hospitals in Dori, where Boundoré commune Mayor Sihanri Osangola Brigadie visited several of the victims. 24 people were killed during the shooting and 18 people were injured, in addition to the three who were taken hostage by the jihadists. The pastor of Pansi was among those killed.

== Aftermath ==
The attack in Pansi was one of a larger spate of attacks conducted by jihadist groups in Sahel Region, particularly against Christians.

No group claimed responsibility for the Pansi attack, although on 29 February, ISGS claimed responsibility for the shooting of four police officers in Sebba.
