= Dassouri =

Town in Centre, Burkina Faso

- Rural commune
- Location in Burkina Faso
- Coordinates: 12°16′08″N 1°43′19″W
- Country: Burkina Faso
- Regions: Centre Region
- Province: Kadiogo Province
- Department: Tanghin-Dassouri Department

Population (2019)
  - Total: 3,223

Dassouri is a populated place located in the Tanghin-Dassouri Department, Kadiogo Province, CentreRegion in Burkina Faso.
