= Samandin-Bilbalgo =

Town in Kadiogo, Burkina Faso

Samandin
- Rural commune
- Location in Burkina Faso
- Coordinates: 12°20′59″N 1°31′57″W
- Country: Burkina Faso
- Regions: Centre Region
- Province: Kadiogo Province
- Department: Saaba Department

Population (2006)
  - Total: 311

Samandin-Bilbalgo is a town located in the province of Kadiogo in Burkina Faso. In 2006, it had a population of 311.
