= Tampouy, Komsilga =

Town in Centre, Burkina Faso

Tampouy
- Rural commune
- Location in Burkina Faso
- Coordinates: 12°07′39″N 1°40′30″W
- Country: Burkina Faso
- Region: Centre Region
- Province: Kadiogo Province
- Department: Komsilga Department

Population (2019)
  - Total: 1,662

Tampouy is a town located in the Komsilga Department, Kadiogo Province, Centre Region in Burkina Faso.
