= Katabtenga =

Town in Centre, Burkina Faso

- Rural commune
- Location in Burkina Faso
- Coordinates: 12°30′23.0″N 1°33′43.8″W
- Country: Burkina Faso
- Regions: Centre Region
- Province: Kadiogo Province
- Department: Pabré Department

Population (2006)
  - Total: 919
  - Genders: 52.5% women 47.5% men

Katabtenga is a town located in the region of Centre in Burkina Faso. It is at 12°30'23.0"N 1°33'43.8"W and has a population of 919, made up of 52.5% women and 47.5% men (2006).
