= Tinsouka =

Town in Centre, Burkina Faso

- Rural commune
- Location in Burkina Faso
- Coordinates: 12°20′42.9″N 1°40′19.5″W
- Country: Burkina Faso
- Region: Centre Region
- Province: Kadiogo Province
- Department: Tanghin-Dassouri Department

Population (2024)
  - Total: unknown

Tinsouka is a town located in the region of Centre in Burkina Faso. It is at 12°20'42.9"N 1°40'19.5"W and has an unknown population (2024).
