= Tansobentinga =

Town in Centre, Burkina Faso

- Rural commune
- Location in Burkina Faso
- Coordinates: 12°18′08.2″N 1°19′24.5″W
- Country: Burkina Faso
- Regions: Centre Region
- Province: Kadiogo Province
- Department: Saaba Department

Population (2019)
  - Total: 3,712

Tansobentinga is a populated place located in the Saaba Department, Kadiogo Province, Centre Region in Burkina Faso.
