= Barogo =

Town in Centre, Burkina Faso

- Rural commune
- Location in Burkina Faso
- Coordinates: 12°25′53″N 1°29′00″W
- Country: Burkina Faso
- Regions: Centre Region
- Province: Kadiogo Province
- Department: Saaba Department

Population (2006)
  - Total: 1,615

Barogo is a populated place located in the Saaba Department in Burkina Faso. It has a population of 1615 in 2006.
