= Mansila attack =

2024 attack in Yagha Province, Burkina Faso

- Part of Islamist insurgency in Burkina Faso
| Date | June 11, 2024 |
| Location | Mansila, Yagha Province, Burkina Faso |
| Result | JNIM victory: Mansila captured by JNIM; Heightened tensions between pro-Traore and anti-Traore factions of the Burkinabe army |

Belligerents
| Burkina Faso | Jama'at Nasr al-Islam wal Muslimin |

Strength
| 150 | Unknown |

Casualties and losses
| 107 killed 7 POWs captured | Unknown |
- 20 civilians killed

On June 11, 2024, jihadists from Jama'at Nasr al-Islam wal-Muslimin (JNIM) attacked the town of Mansila and its military base, killing over a hundred Burkinabe soldiers. The attack weakened public perception of the Burkinabe junta and sparked tensions between the junta and disgruntled military officers.

== Background ==
Violence by jihadist groups increased exponentially since the September 2022 Burkina Faso coup d'état that overthrew putschist Paul-Henri Sandaogo Damiba, who came to power in a coup that January. Much of the violence was caused by the al-Qaeda-aligned Jama'at Nasr al-Islam wal-Muslimin (JNIM) and its affiliates in Burkina Faso and the Islamic State – Sahil Province, which have besieged towns and launched deadly attacks on Burkinabe soldiers and pro-government militiamen.

== Attack ==
At the time of the attack, the Mansila base was defended by around 150 Burkinabe soldiers. JNIM fighters first attacked the military base before entering the town itself, where they opened fire on civilians and torched several homes. The attack was claimed a few days later by JNIM. In their statement, JNIM claimed to have killed 107 Burkinabe soldiers and captured seven POWs. A video was released showing three vehicles, 142 AK-47 rifles, 11 PKM machine guns, 13 RPG rocket launchers, 70 rockets, and a large quantity of ammunition seized from the base. RFI and Jeune Afrique corroborated the claims that over a hundred soldiers were killed, although civilian deaths remained unknown until September, when Human Rights Watch published a report stating twenty civilians accused of collaborating with the government were killed.

The Burkinabe junta did not release a statement acknowledging the attack.

== Aftermath and reactions ==
The silence of the Burkinabe authorities on the attack angered many soldiers. A West African security source told Le Monde that "The soldiers are dying like dogs, in total anonymity. They are buried at the sites of the attacks, without national mourning or ceremony. The regime no longer even gives a report on the attacks. This has revolted the soldiers."

On June 12, a brief skirmish broke out between soldiers close to Burkinabe leader Ibrahim Traoré. A rocket was fired into the courtyard of the presidential palace while Traore was speaking with his cabinet inside. While state media referred to the firing as a "shooting incident", Le Monde stated that young soldiers attempted to rebel against Traore. Underground negotiations were underway with disgruntled officers to organize a coup against Traore, although a leader hadn't been agreed upon.

A few days after the Mansila attack, around 80 to 120 Russian soldiers from the Wagner Group based in Mali arrived in Ouagadougou to support Traore. Traore appeared in public on June 19 to chair his council of ministers, his first public appearance since the attack.

The town of Mansila was recaptured by Burkinabe forces on July 2.
