= Sakoula =

Town in Centre, Burkina Faso

- Location in Burkina Faso
- Coordinates: 12°27′17.6″N 1°31′21.6″W
- Country: Burkina Faso
- Regions: Centre Region
- Province: Kadiogo Province
- Department: Ouagadougou Department

Sakoula is a populated place in the Ouagadougou Department, Kadiogo Province, Centre Region in Burkina Faso.
