= Nakamtinga =

Town in Centre, Burkina Faso

- Rural commune
- Location in Burkina Faso
- Coordinates: 12°14′11.2″N 1°20′08.5″W
- Country: Burkina Faso
- Regions: Centre Region
- Province: Kadiogo Province
- Department: Koubri Department

Population (2019)
  - Total: 1,253

Nakamtinga is a town located in the Koubri Department, Kadiogo Province, Centre Region, Burkina Faso.
