= Koakin =

Koakin may refer to:

- Koakin, Kombissiri, Burkina Faso
- Koakin, Saponé, Burkina Faso
