= Kouidi =

Town in Centre, Burkina Faso

- Rural commune
- Location in Burkina Faso
- Coordinates: 12°27′48.3″N 1°18′44.0″W
- Country: Burkina Faso
- Region: Centre Region
- Province: Kadiogo Province
- Department: Saaba Department

Population (2024)
  - Total: unknown

Kouidi is a populated place located in the Saaba Department, Centre Region in Burkina Faso. It is at 12°27'48.3"N 1°18'44.0"W and has an unknown population (2024).
