= Bassemyam =

- Location within Burkina Faso
- Coordinates: 12°12′33″N 1°32′23″W
- Country: Burkina Faso
- Regions: Centre Region
- Province: Kadiogo Province
- Department: Komsilga Department

Population (2019)
  - Total: 2,809
- Time zone: UTC+0 (GMT)

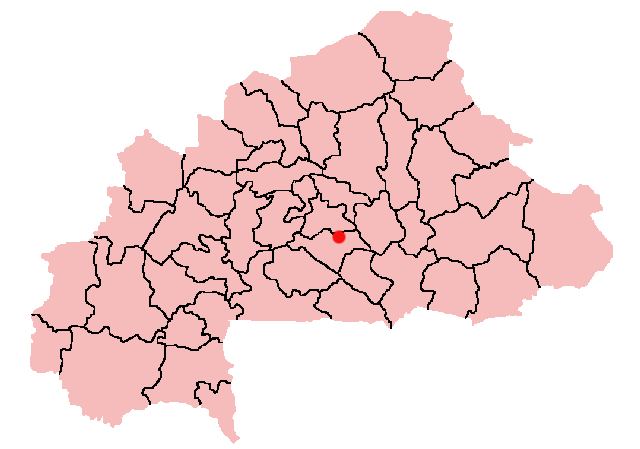
Location of Kombissiri in Burkina Faso

Bassemyam or Bassiyam is a city located in Komsilga Department, Kadiogo Province in Burkina Faso.

Population
Year	Pop.	±%
2006	1,378	—
2019	2,809	+103.8%

== Sister cities ==
- Mirebeau, France
