= Kossodo =

Town in Centre, Burkina Faso

- Location in Burkina Faso
- Coordinates: 12°09′43.2″N 1°40′32.6″W
- Country: Burkina Faso
- Region: Centre Region
- Province: Kadiogo Province
- Department: Komki-Ipala Department

Population (2006)
  - Total: 254

Kossodo is a populated place located in the region of Komki-Ipala Department in Burkina Faso. In 2006, it had a population of 254.
