= Zambanega, Kadiogo =

Town in Centre, Burkina Faso

Zambanaga
- Rural commune
- Location in Burkina Faso
- Coordinates: 12°14′04.2″N 1°40′55.5″W
- Country: Burkina Faso
- Regions: Centre Region
- Province: Kadiogo Province
- Department: Tanghin-Dassouri Department

Population (2019)
  - Total: 1,293

Zambanega or Zambenaga is a populated place located in the Tanghin-Dassouri Department, Kadiogo Province, Centre in Burkina Faso.
