= Goupana =

Town in Centre, Burkina Faso

- Rural commune
- Location in Burkina Faso
- Coordinates: 12°37′02.4″N 1°35′11.2″W
- Country: Burkina Faso
- Regions: Centre Region
- Province: Kadiogo Province
- Department: Pabre Department

Population (2019)
  - Total: 2,318

Goupana is a town located in the Pabre Department, Kadiogo Province, Centre Region in Burkina Faso.
