= Kouba, Burkina Faso =

Town in Centre, Burkina Faso

Kouba
- Rural commune
- Location in Burkina Faso
- Coordinates: 12°14′24.3″N 1°25′48.7″W
- Country: Burkina Faso
- Regions: Centre Region
- Province: Kadiogo Province
- Department: Koubri Department

Population (2019)
  - Total: 5,936

Kouba is a populated place located in the Koubri Department, Kadiogo Province, Centre Region in Burkina Faso.
