= Pamnonghin =

Town in Centre, Burkina Faso

- Rural commune
- Location in Burkina Faso
- Coordinates: 12°10′16.0″N 1°33′51.0″W
- Country: Burkina Faso
- Regions: Centre Region
- Province: Kadiogo Province
- Department: Komsilga Department

Population (2024)
  - Total: unknown

Pamnoghin is a town located in the region of Centre in Burkina Faso. It is at 12°10'16.0"N 1°33'51.0"W and has an unknown population (2024).
