= Komsilga, Komsilga =

Komsilga
- Location within Burkina Faso
- Coordinates: 12°11′11″N 01°38′01″W
- Country: Burkina Faso
- Region: Centre Region
- Province: Kadiogo Province
- Department: Komsilga Department
- Time zone: UTC+0 (GMT)

Komsilga is a town and the capital of the Komsilga Department, in the Kadiogo Province of central Burkina Faso.
