= Habanga =

Town in Sahel, Burkina Faso

Habanga Abanga
- Rural commune
- Location in Burkina Faso
- Coordinates: 13°19′27.4″N 0°18′41.4″E
- Country: Burkina Faso
- Region: Sahel Region
- Province: Yagha Province
- Department: Solhan Department

Population (2019)
  - Total: 5,456

Habanga is a town located in the Solhan Department, Yagha Province, Sahel in Burkina Faso.
