= Bagnaba =

Town in Sahel, Burkina Faso

- Rural commune
- Location in Burkina Faso
- Coordinates: 13°21′17″N 0°41′55″E
- Country: Burkina Faso
- Region: Sahel Region
- Province: Yagha Province
- Department: Sebba Department

Population (2019)
  - Total: 268

Bagnaba or Baniaba is a populated place located in the Sebba Department, Yagha Province, Sahel Region in Burkina Faso.
