= 2021 Burkina Faso attack =

2021 Burkina Faso attack may refer to one of the following:

- Solhan massacre which took place in June 2021
- August 2021 Burkina Faso attack
