= Sankouissi =

Sankouissi is the name of two villages in Burkina Faso:

- Sankouissi, Toece, Bazèga Province
- Sankouissi, Gounghin, Kouritenga Province
