= Bangma =

Bangma is a surname. Notable people with the surname include:

- Diederik Bangma (born 1990), Dutch footballer
- Tristan Bangma (born 1997), Dutch Paralympic cyclist

== See also ==
- Bangma, Burkina Faso
