= Tanghin, Saaba =

Tanghin
- Rural commune
- Location in Burkina Faso
- Coordinates: 12°21′28.6″N 1°22′19.9″W
- Country: Burkina Faso
- Regions: Centre Region
- Province: Kadiogo Province
- Department: Saaba Department

Tanghin is a populated place located in the Saaba Department, Kadiogo Province, Centre Region in Burkina Faso.
