= Bangma, Burkina Faso =

Town in Centre, Burkina Faso

Bangma
- Location in Burkina Faso
- Coordinates: 12°09′32.2″N 1°37′07.4″W
- Country: Burkina Faso
- Region: Centre Region
- Province: Kadiogo Province
- Department: Komsilga Department

Population (2024)
  - Total: unknown

Bangma is a populated place located in Komsilga Department, Kadiogo Province in Burkina Faso. It is at 12°09'32.2"N 1°37'07.4"W and has an unknown population (2024).
