= Arbinda attacks =

Arbinda attacks refers to the following events in Burkina Faso:

- Arbinda attack, 24 December 2019
- Arbinda massacre, 18 August 2021
