= Bangaba =

Town in Sahel region of Burkina Faso

- Rural commune
- Location in Burkina Faso
- Coordinates: 13°21′27.5″N 0°18′41.4″E
- Country: Burkina Faso
- Region: Sahel Region
- Province: Yagha Province
- Department: Solhan Department

Population (2019)
  - Total: 3,120

Bangaba is a town located in the Solhan Department, Yagha Province, Sahel Region in Burkina Faso.
