= Tankougounadié (department) =

- Department
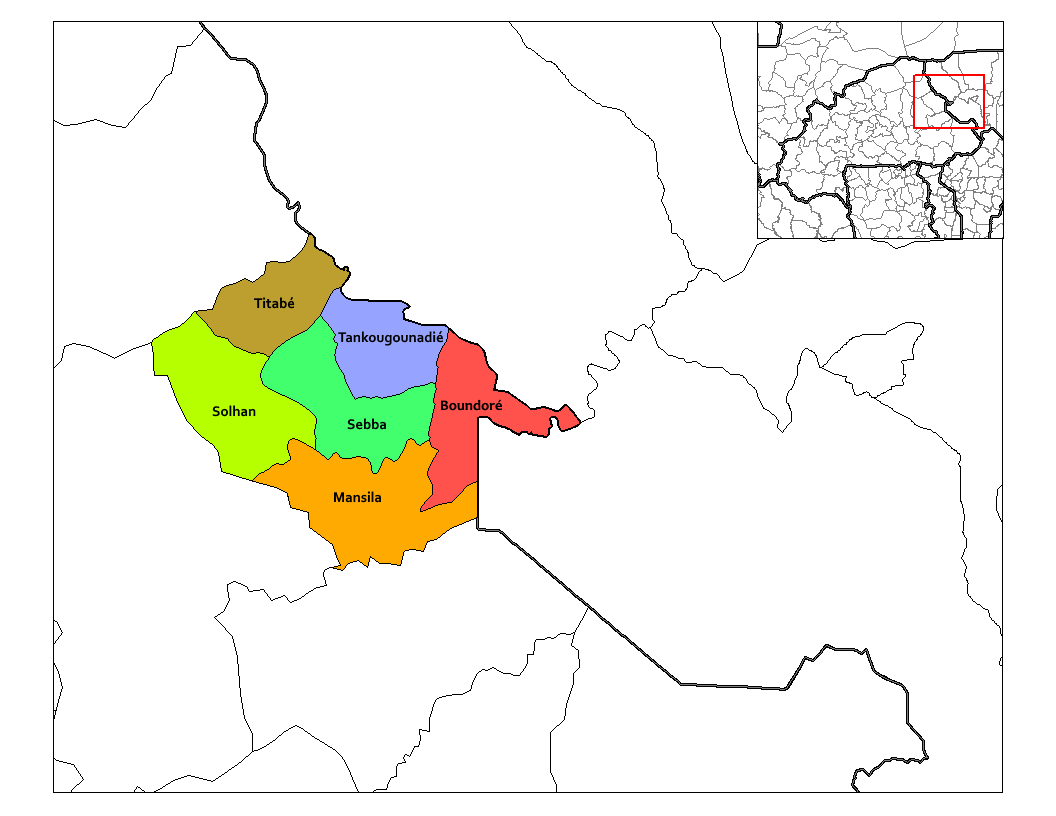
- Tankougounadié Department location in the province
- Country: Burkina Faso
- Region: Plateau-Central Region
- Province: Yagha Province

Area
  - Total: 332.0 sq mi (859.9 km^{2})

Population (2019 census)
  - Total: 21,894
- Time zone: UTC+0 (GMT 0)

Tankougounadié is a department or commune of Yagha Province in Burkina Faso.
