= Paglayiri =

Town in Kadiogo, Burkina Faso

- Rural commune
- Location in Burkina Faso
- Coordinates: 12°20′00″N 1°31′52″W
- Country: Burkina Faso
- Province: Kadiogo Province

Population (2024)
  - Total: unknown

Paglayiri is a neighbourhood of Ouagadougou, Burkina Faso. It is at 12°20'00"N 1°31'52"W
