= Kaba, Burkina Faso =

Town in Centre-Ouest, Burkina Faso

Kaba
- Rural commune
- Location in Burkina Faso
- Coordinates: 12°43′29″N 2°03′26″W
- Country: Burkina Faso
- Region: Nord Region
- Province: Passore Province
- Department: Arbolle Department

Population (2019)
  - Total: 1,593

Kaba is a populated place in the Arbolle Department, Passore Province, on the border between the regions of Nord Region in Burkina Faso.
