= Karpala =

Town in Kadiogo, Burkina Faso

- Rural commune
- Location in Burkina Faso
- Coordinates: 12°19′53″N 1°29′4″W
- Country: Burkina Faso
- Province: Kadiogo Province

Population (2024)
  - Total: unknown

Karpala is a neighbourhood in Ouagadougou, Burkina Faso. It is at 12°19'53"N 1°29'4"W and has an unknown population (2024).

== Notable residents ==
- Serge Oulon – journalist.
