= Kampti =

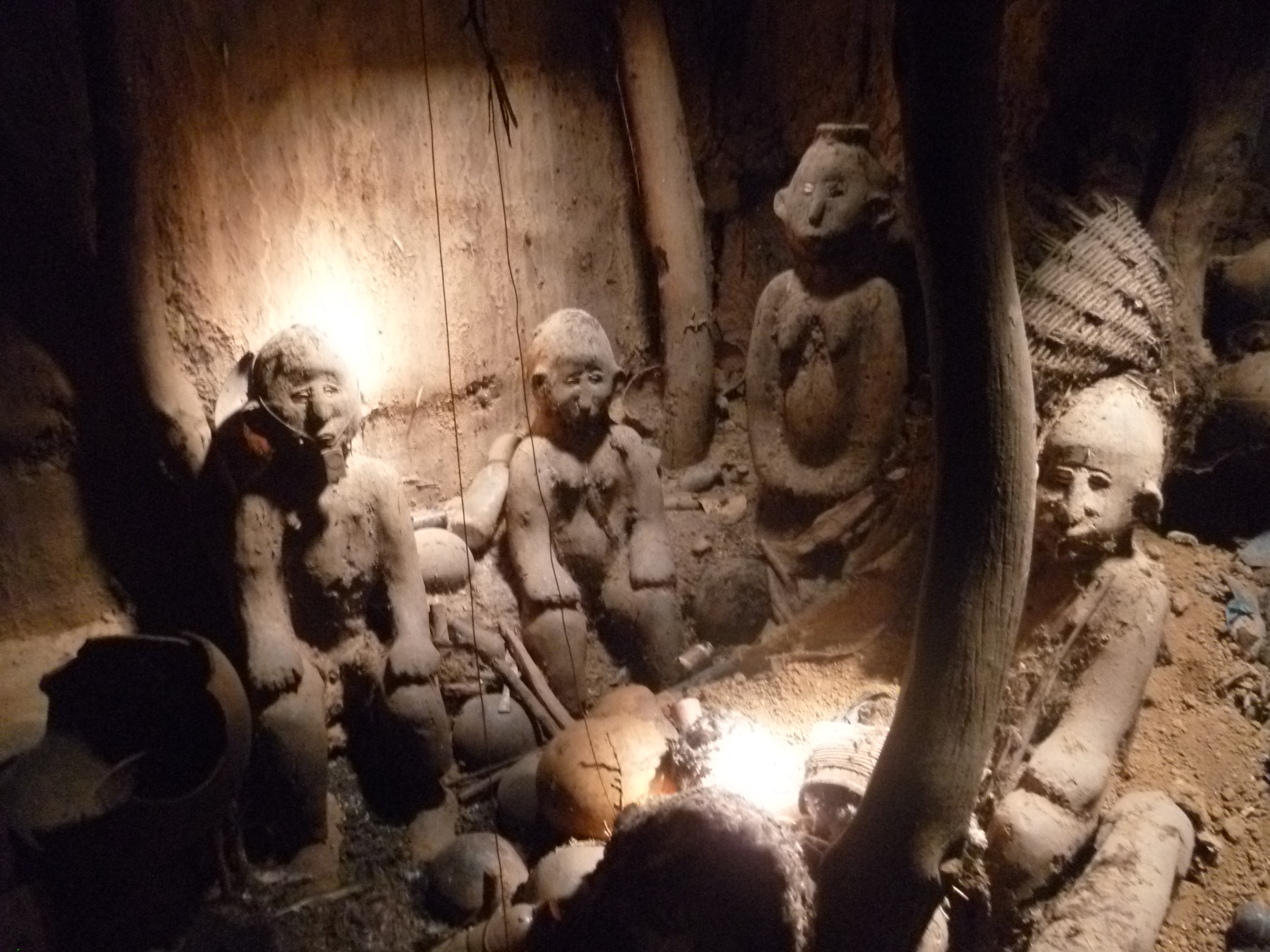
- Ancient cave in Kampti

- Location in Burkina Faso
- Coordinates: 10°8′29″N 3°27′26″W
- Country: Burkina Faso
- Region: Sud-Ouest Region
- Province: Poni Province
- Department: Kampti Department
- Time zone: UTC+0 (GMT 0)

Kampti is a village in Burkina Faso and capital of Kampti Department.

== See also ==
- List of cities in Burkina Faso
