= Cissin =

Neighborhood of Ouagadougou, Burkina Faso

- Location in Burkina Faso
- Coordinates: 12°19′29.0″N 1°32′05.6″W
- Country: Burkina Faso
- Region: Centre Region

Population (2024)
  - Total: unknown

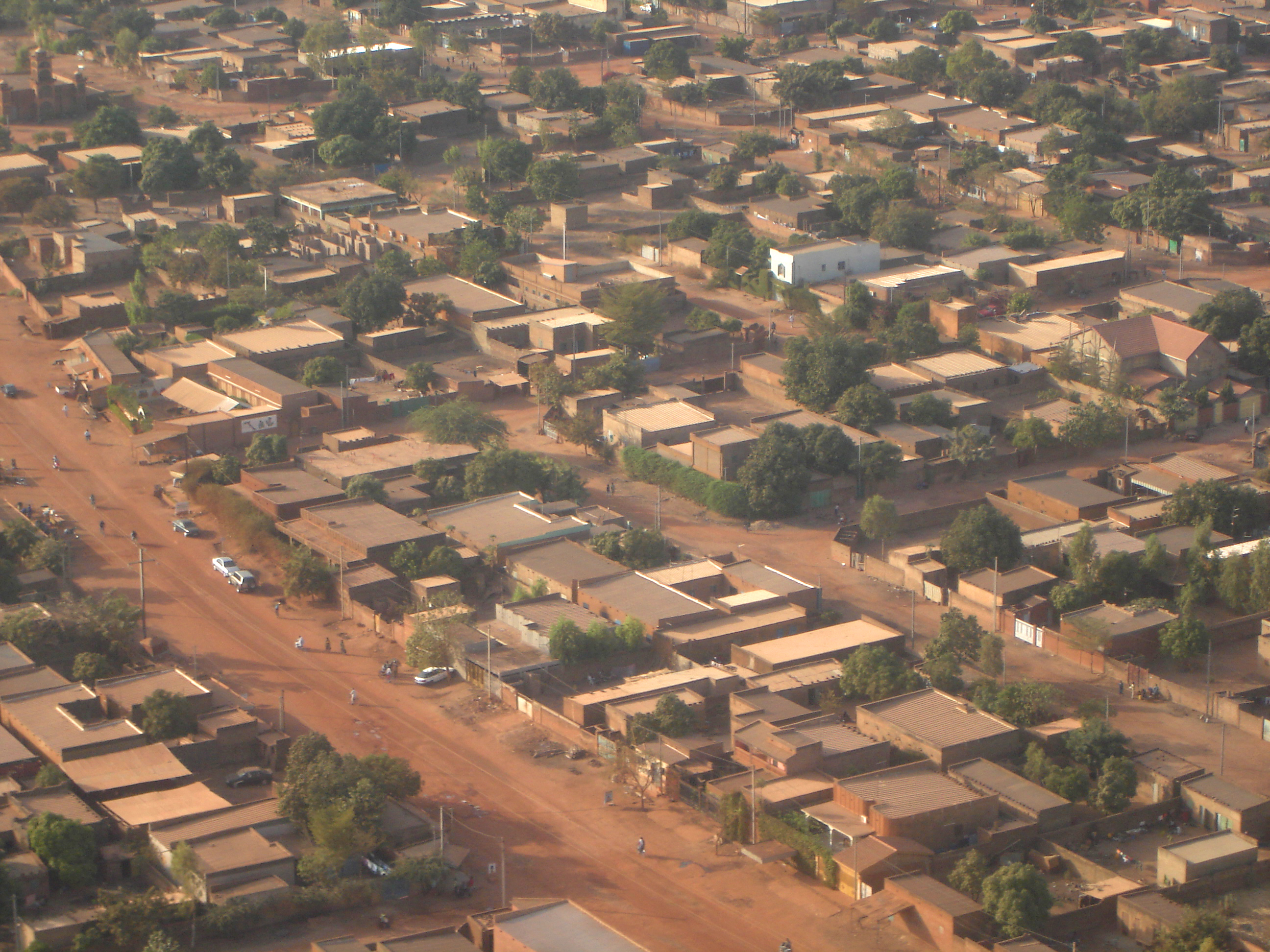
Burkina Faso: Aerial view of Ouagadougou (rue Warba in Sector 16, Cissin district)

Cissin is a neighborhood of Ouagadougou, Burkina Faso.
