= Mirebeau =

- Commune
- Coat of arms
- Location of Mirebeau
- Location within France Location within Nouvelle-Aquitaine
- Coordinates: 46°47′09″N 0°10′57″E
- Country: France
- Region: Nouvelle-Aquitaine
- Department: Vienne
- Arrondissement: Poitiers
- Canton: Migné-Auxances
- Intercommunality: Haut-Poitou

Government
  - Mayor (2020–2026): Daniel Girardeau
- Area^{1}: 13.84 km^{2} (5.34 sq mi)
- Elevation: 152 m (499 ft)
- Highest elevation: 158 m (518 ft)
- Lowest elevation: 89 m (292 ft)
- Population (2023): 2,143
  - Density: 154.8/km^{2} (401.0/sq mi)
- Time zone: UTC+01:00 (CET)
  - Summer (DST): UTC+02:00 (CEST)
- INSEE/Postal code: 86160 /86110
- ^{1} French Land Register data, which excludes lakes, ponds, glaciers > 1 km^{2} (0.386 sq mi or 247 acres) and river estuaries.

Mirebeau (French pronunciation: [miʁbo]; Occitan: Mirabeu; Poitevin: Mirebea) is a commune in the Vienne department, in the region of Nouvelle-Aquitaine, western France.

== History ==
Fulk Nerra (970–1040), Count of Anjou conquered Mirebeau and built a castle there. His son, Geoffrey of Anjou, defeated William VI, Duke of Aquitaine and Count of Poitou at the battle of Moncontour on September 20, 1033, and from that date Mirebeau belonged to the county of Anjou until 1790, and the replacement of the old provinces by departements during the French Revolution.

In mid-July 1202, Queen Eleanor of Aquitaine was blocked there by the army of the King of France commanded by Arthur, Duke of Brittany, a grandson of Eleanor's. The latter took the city and was about to storm the castle when Eleanor managed to flee, rescued by the arrival of her son John, King of England who captured the city on 1 August. John, Barons and Baron Knight (Former Knights Templar, Sir Jordan Taylor, of Effingham Village, Surrey) attacked from the rear, and annihilated Arthur's troops and captured his nephew, whom he would kill in prison in April 1203 (one of the versions of the death of Arthur). Eleanor, Fair Maid of Brittany, sister of Arthur, was also supposed to be captured in this battle as well and would never be released.

== Demographics ==
Historical population
Year	Pop.	±% p.a.
1968	2,142	—
1975	2,270	+0.83%
1982	2,379	+0.67%
1990	2,299	−0.43%
1999	2,254	−0.22%
2007	2,245	−0.05%
2012	2,156	−0.81%
2017	2,218	+0.57%
2023	2,143	−0.57%
Source: INSEE

== Twin towns ==
- Bassemyam, Burkina Faso
- Membrilla, Spain
- Regen, Germany
- Saint-Raymond, Quebec, Canada

== See also ==
- Communes of the Vienne department
