= Haaba, Burkina Faso =

Town in Est, Burkina Faso

Haaba
- Rural commune
- Location in Burkina Faso
- Coordinates: 12°55′38″N 0°44′34″E
- Country: Burkina Faso
- Region: Est Region
- Province: Komondjari Province
- Department: Bartiébougou Department

Population (2019)
  - Total: 2,422

Haaba is a populated place located in the Bartiébougou Department, Komondjari Province, Est Region in Burkina Faso.
