= Kabala, Burkina Faso =

Town in Hauts-Bassins, Burkina Faso

Kabala
- Rural commune
- Location in Burkina Faso
- Coordinates: 11°31′58″N 4°45′57″W
- Country: Burkina Faso
- Regions: Hauts-Bassins Region
- Province: Kénédougou Province
- Department: Kourouma Department

Population (2019)
  - Total: 3,924

Kabala is a populated place located in Kourouma Department, Kénédougou Province, Hauts-Bassins Region, Burkina Faso.
