= Zogona =

Neighborhood of Ouagadougou, Burkina Faso

- Location in Burkina Faso
- Coordinates: 12°22′42″N 1°29′26″W
- Country: Burkina Faso
- Region: Centre Region

Zogona is a neighbourhood of Ouagadougou, Burkina Faso. It contains the main campus of the University of Ouagadougou.
