= Serge Oulon =

Burkinabé journalist

Atiana Serge Oulon is a Burkinabé journalist and director of L'Événement, a bimonthly investigative newspaper. In June 2024, he was among three journalists abducted by gunmen in separate incidents in Burkina Faso.

== Career ==
Oulon was born and raised in Ouagadougou. After working as a journalist for Courrier confidentiel and Radio Liberté, in 2019 he joined L'Événement as its director.

In December 2022, Oulon published an article reporting that Prospère Boena, an army captain in the Centre Nord Region, had allegedly embezzled 400 million F.CFAs from the budget of the Volunteers for the Defence of the Homeland, an auxiliary force that supported the Burkina Faso Armed Forces. Boena was an associate of the interim President of Burkina Faso, Ibrahim Traoré, who in February 2023 stated that Oulon had either lacked "the right information" or otherwise was acting in "bad faith", and accused him of fostering a "climate of mistrust" between soldiers and volunteers.

In June 2024, Oulon published an additional article about the case, in which he noted that a key witness in the embezzlement case against Boena had died. As a result of the article, Burkina Faso's media regulator, the Superior Council for Communication, suspended L'Événement for a month starting from 20 June.

== Abduction ==
At 05:00 UTC on 24 June 2024, Oulon was abducted from his home in Karpala, Ouagadougou, by at least nine gunmen dressed in civilian clothing. Oulon's brother, Ouezin Louis Oulon, stated in a subsequent interview that the gunmen returned to the home around five hours later to demand Oulon's phone and laptop from his wife; he stated that they had identified themselves as working for the National Intelligence Agency.

Following Oulon's abduction, his family have been unable to find him at various police stations and gendarmerie brigades, and they reported that the authorities did not shared his location with them. In the months prior to his disappearance, Oulon had, alongside the anonymous Facebook account Henry Segbo, began documenting enforced disappearances believed to have been carried out by the National Intelligence Agency or the Presidential Security Squads.

=== Response ===
Oulon's abduction occurred in the same month as two prominent television commentators and well-known critics of the military junta, Adama Bayala and Kalifara Séré; Séré worked for the television channel BF1 which, like L'Événement, had been temporarily suspended by the Superior Council for Communication in June 2024. Like Oulon, both men were taken from locations in Ouagadougou. Local media suggested that the men may have been forcibly conscripted into the Burkinabé armed forces, and also reported that the kidnaps were being praised on pro-Traoré social media accounts.

The Professional Media Organisations, an alliance of Burkinabé independent media outlets, denounced the disappearances of Oulon, Bayala, and Séré, citing it as "proof that the press in Burkina Faso is the subject of harassment and intimidation". The Media Foundation of West Africa expressed its "deep outrage" at news of Oulon's abduction.

Internationally, Reporters Without Borders concluded it was highly likely that the Burkinabé government was involved in Oulon's disappearance, and called on them to immediately release him, citing his "professionalism and integrity". The Committee to Project Journalists similarly called on Burkinabé officials to do what they could to ensure the safe returns of Oulon, Bayala, and Séré.

Two years after Oulon's disappearance, a joint statement by human rights organisations including Human Rights Watch, Amnesty International, Observatoire Kital, the Observatory for the Protection of Human Rights Defenders and Reporters Without Borders called on Burkinabé authorities to "urgently account" for Oulon.
