= Dinkabara =

Town in Centre-Ouest, Burkina Faso

- Rural commune
- Location in Burkina Faso
- Coordinates: 10°11′12″N 3°26′26″W
- Country: Burkina Faso
- Region: Sud-Ouest Region
- Province: Poni Province
- Department: Kampti Department

Population (2019)
  - Total: 1,275

Dinkabara is a town located in the Kampti Department, Poni Province, Sud-Ouest Region in Burkina Faso.
