= Bangataka =

Town in Sahel region of Burkina Faso

- Rural commune
- Location in Burkina Faso
- Coordinates: 13°58′50″N 0°24′12″W
- Country: Burkina Faso
- Region: Sahel Region
- Province: Soum Province
- Department: Gorgadji Department

Population (2019)
  - Total: 913

Bangataka is a town located in the Gorgadji Department, Soum Province, Sahel, Burkina Faso.
