= Gorgadji Department =

Coordinates: 14°01′52″N 0°31′24″W

Gorgadji
- Department
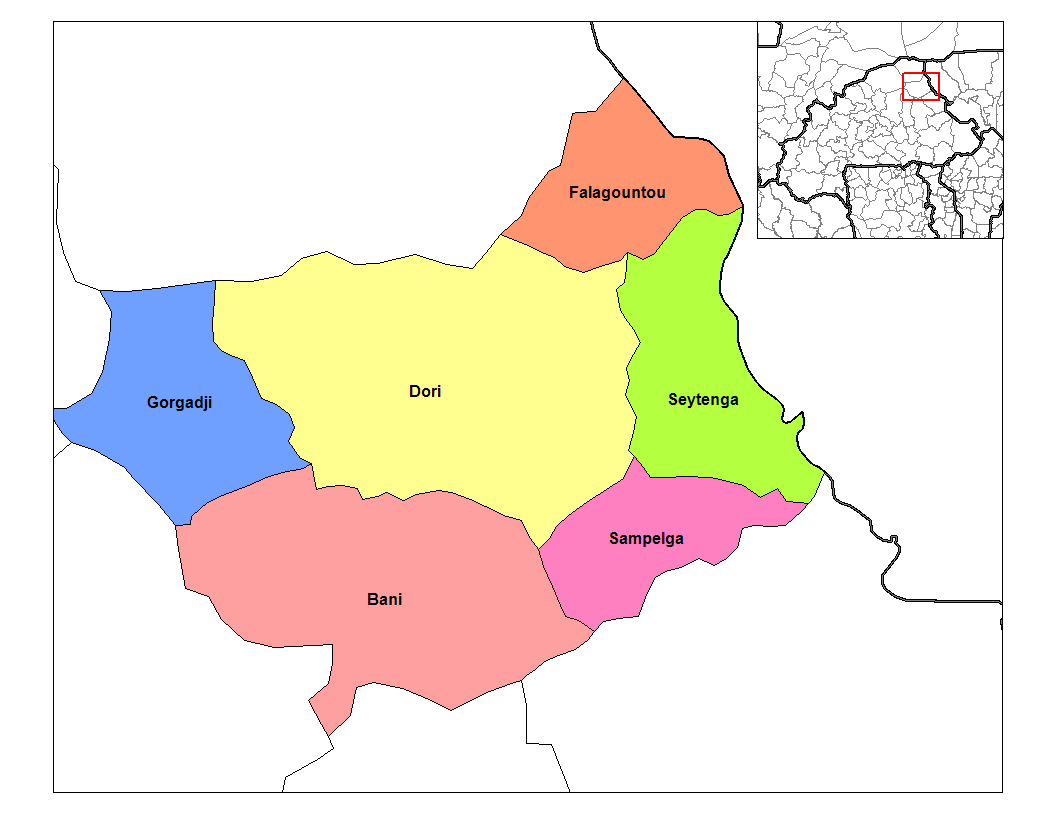
- Gorgadji Department location in the province
- Country: Burkina Faso
- Province: Séno Province
- Time zone: UTC+0 (GMT 0)

Gorgadji is a department or commune of Séno Province in northern Burkina Faso. Its capital lies at the town of Gorgadji.

== Towns and villages ==
- Bangataka
