= Kampti Department =

Coordinates: 10°08′N 3°27′W

Kampti
- Department
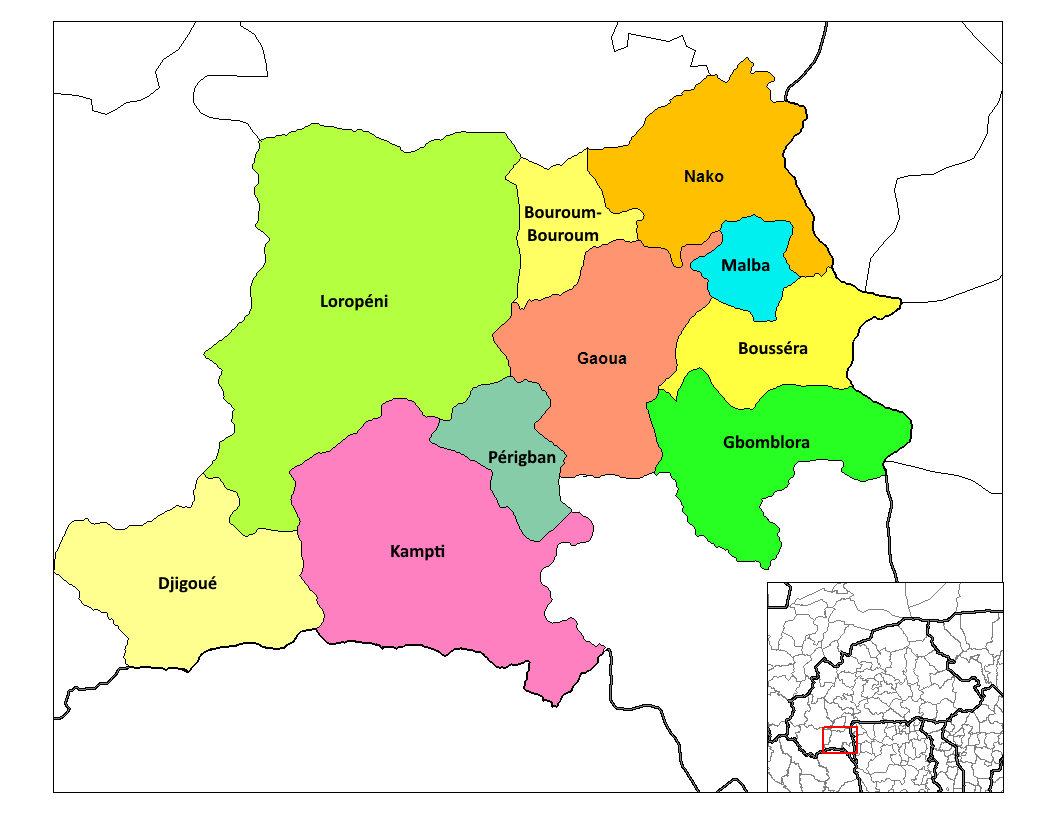
- Kampti Department location in the province
- Country: Burkina Faso
- Province: Poni Province

Area
  - Total: 502 sq mi (1,299 km^{2})

Population (2019 census)
  - Total: 65,725
  - Density: 131.0/sq mi (50.60/km^{2})
- Time zone: UTC+0 (GMT 0)

Kampti is a department or commune of Poni Province in southern Burkina Faso. Its capital lies at the town of Kampti.
