= Gantin, Burkina Faso =

Town in Centre, Burkina Faso

Gantin
- Location in Burkina Faso
- Coordinates: 12°33′51″N 1°47′35″W
- Country: Burkina Faso
- Region: Plateau Central Region
- Province: Kourweogo Province
- Department: Laye Department

Population (2019)
  - Total: 1,220

Gantin is a village located in the region of Plateau Central Region in Burkina Faso.
