= Tangin Dassouri =

- Location within Burkina Faso, French West Africa
- Coordinates: 12°16′N 1°43′W
- Country: Burkina Faso
- Province: Kadiogo
- Elevation: 315 m (1,033 ft)

Population (2012)
  - Total: 43,675
- Time zone: UTC+0 (GMT)
- Climate: BSh

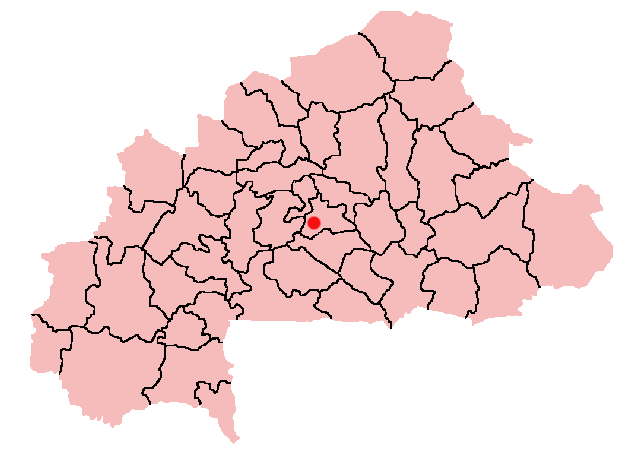
Location of Tangin Dassouri in Burkina Faso

Tangin Dassouri is a city located in the Tanghin-Dassouri Department of Kadiogo Province in Burkina Faso.

== In popular culture ==
- The music video for Ivorian–Burkinabé singer Imilo Lechanceux's 2017 song "Une Minute au Village" ("One Minute in the Village") was shot in Tanghin-Dassouri.
