= Malioma =

- Location in Burkina Faso
- Coordinates: 13°13′N 0°14′W
- Country: Burkina Faso
- Region: Est Region
- Province: Gnagna Province
- Department: Manni Department

Population (2019)
  - Total: 699

Malioma is a village in the Manni Department of Gnagna Province in eastern Burkina Faso. The climate of the village is a 'semi-arid steppe'.

Population
Year	Pop.	±%
1985	159	—
2006	414	+160.4%
2019	699	+68.8%
