= Diabatou =

- Location in Burkina Faso
- Coordinates: 12°43′39″N 0°6′33″W
- Country: Burkina Faso
- Region: Est Region
- Province: Gnagna Province
- Department: Piéla Department

Population (2019)
  - Total: 3,830

Diabatou is a town in the Piéla Department of Gnagna Province in eastern Burkina Faso.

Population
Year	Pop.	±%
1985	1,569	—
2006	3,188	+103.2%
2019	3,830	+20.1%
