= Boundoré (department) =

- Department
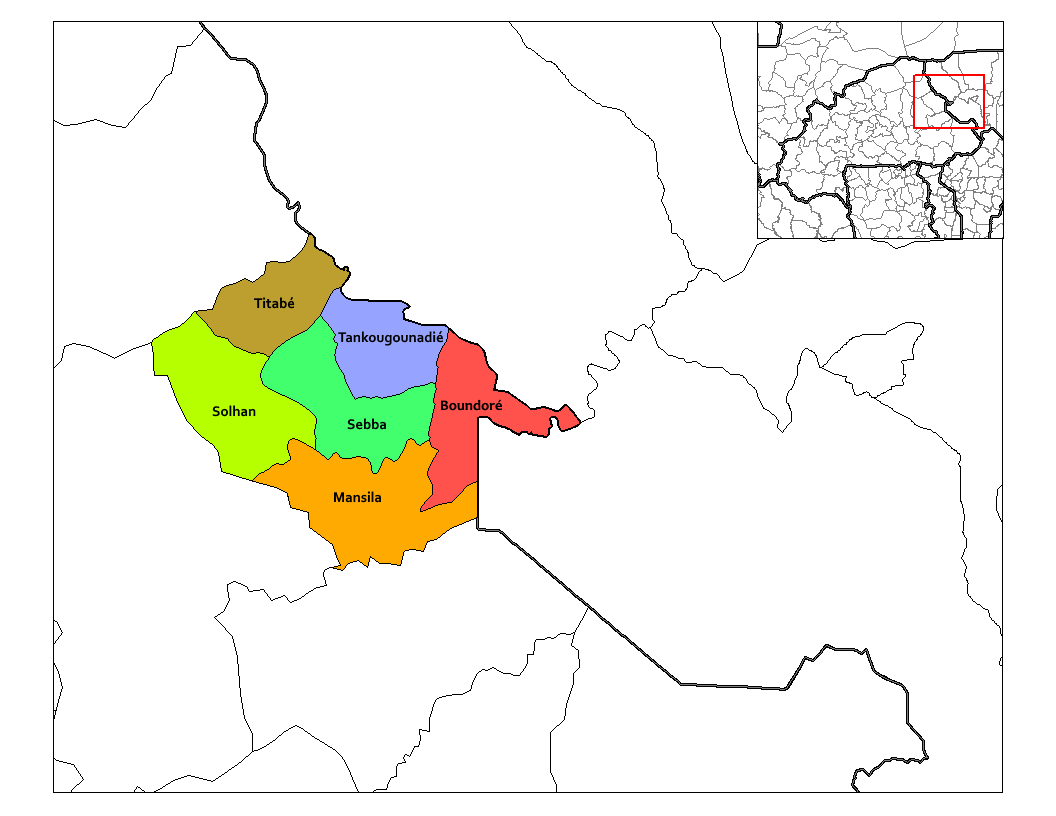
- Boundoré Department location in the province
- Country: Burkina Faso
- Region: Plateau-Central Region
- Province: Yagha Province

Area
  - Total: 367.0 sq mi (950.5 km^{2})

Population (2019 census)
  - Total: 15,918
  - Density: 43.37/sq mi (16.75/km^{2})
- Time zone: UTC+0 (GMT 0)

Boundoré is a department or commune of Yagha Province in Burkina Faso.
