= Kourouma Department =

Coordinates: 11°37′N 4°48′W

Kourouma
- Department
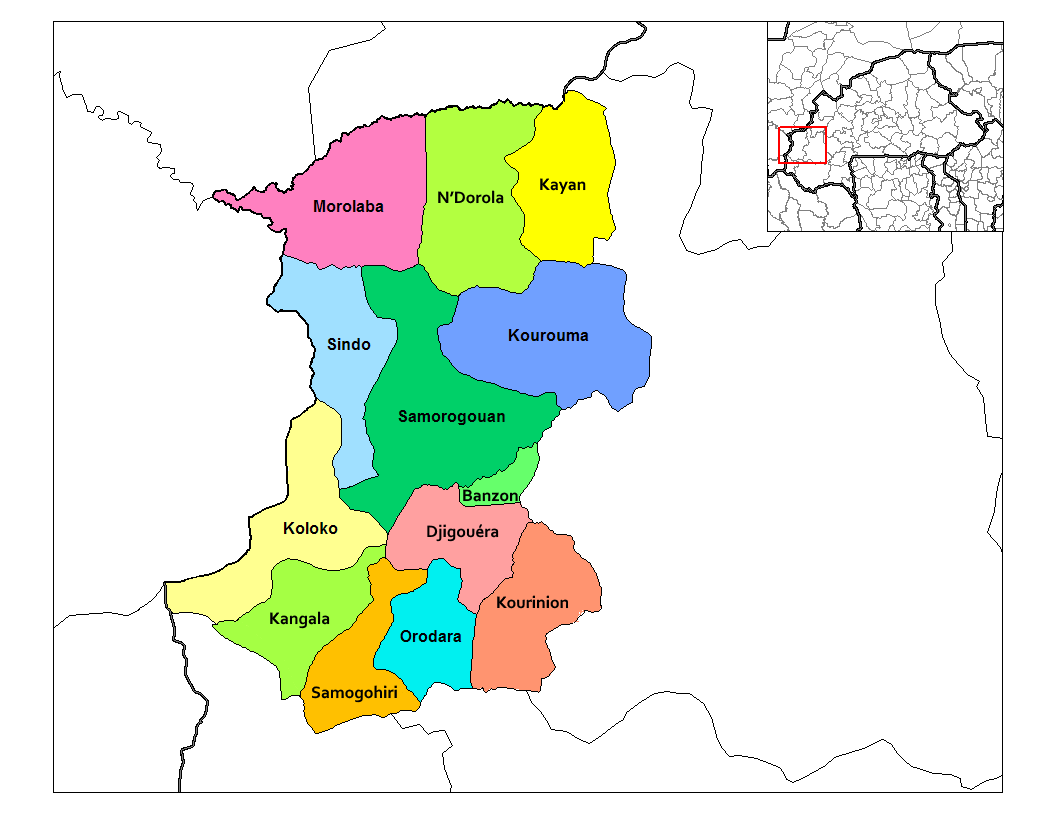
- Kourouma Department location in the province
- Country: Burkina Faso
- Province: Kénédougou Province

Area
  - Total: 386 sq mi (999 km^{2})

Population (2019 census)
  - Total: 51,231
  - Density: 133/sq mi (51.3/km^{2})
- Time zone: UTC+0 (GMT 0)

Kourouma is a department or commune of Kénédougou Province in south-western Burkina Faso. Its capital is the town of Kourouma.
