= Ouagadougou Department =

Coordinates: 12°21′N 1°31′W

Ouagadougou
- Department
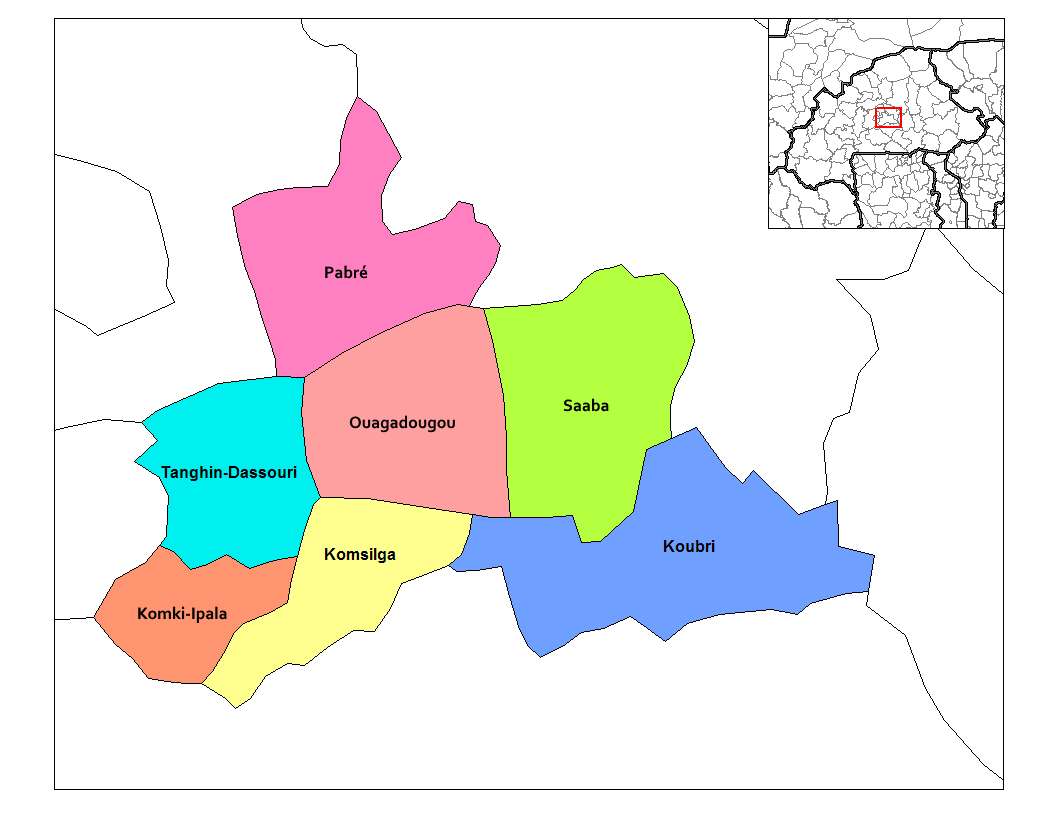
- Kadiogo Department location in the province
- Country: Burkina Faso
- Province: Kadiogo Province

Area
  - Total: 200.7 sq mi (519.8 km^{2})

Population (2019 census)
  - Total: 2,415,266
  - Density: 12,030/sq mi (4,647/km^{2})
- Time zone: UTC+0 (GMT 0)

Ouagadougou (formerly Kadiogo Department) is a department or commune of Kadiogo Province in central Burkina Faso.

== Towns and villages ==
The department's capital is the town of Ouagadougou.
