= Arbollé Department =

Coordinates: 12°51′00″N 2°03′00″W

Arbollé
- Department
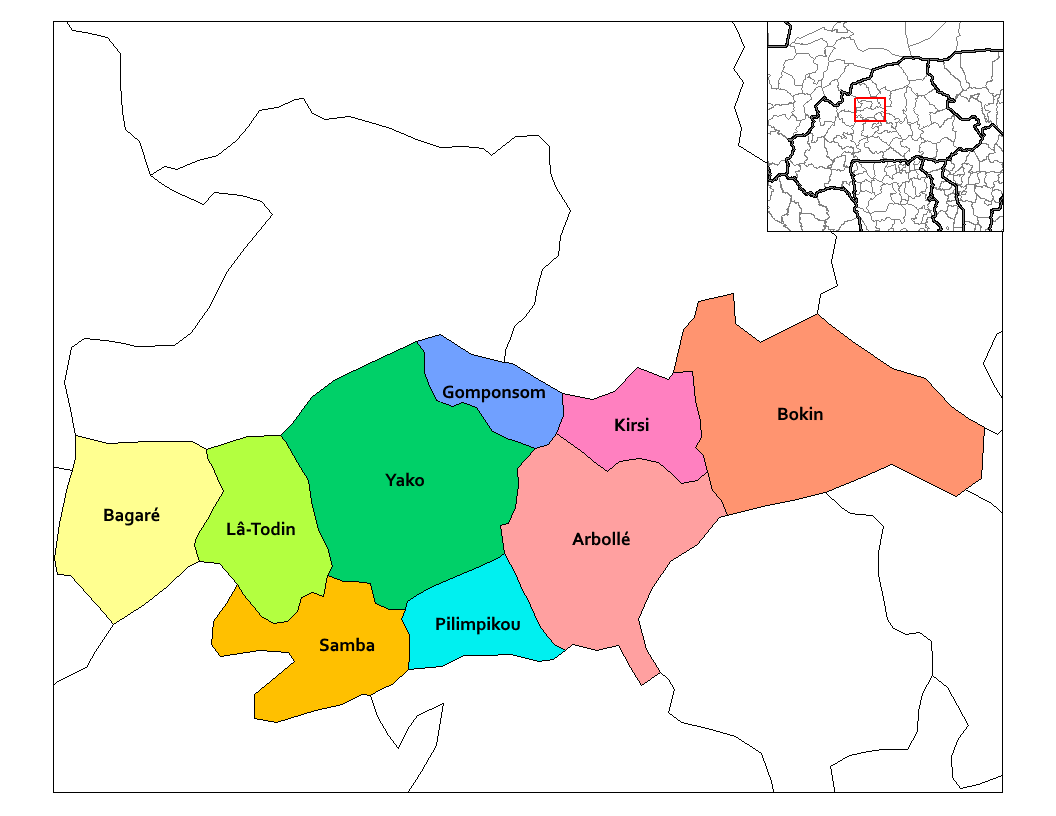
- Arbollé Department location in the province
- Country: Burkina Faso
- Province: Passoré Province

Area
  - Total: 248.0 sq mi (642.4 km^{2})

Population (2019 census)
  - Total: 60,270
  - Density: 243.0/sq mi (93.82/km^{2})
- Time zone: UTC+0 (GMT 0)

Arbollé is a department or commune of Passoré Province in north central Burkina Faso. Its capital is the eponymous town of Arbollé.
