= Mansila (department) =

- Department
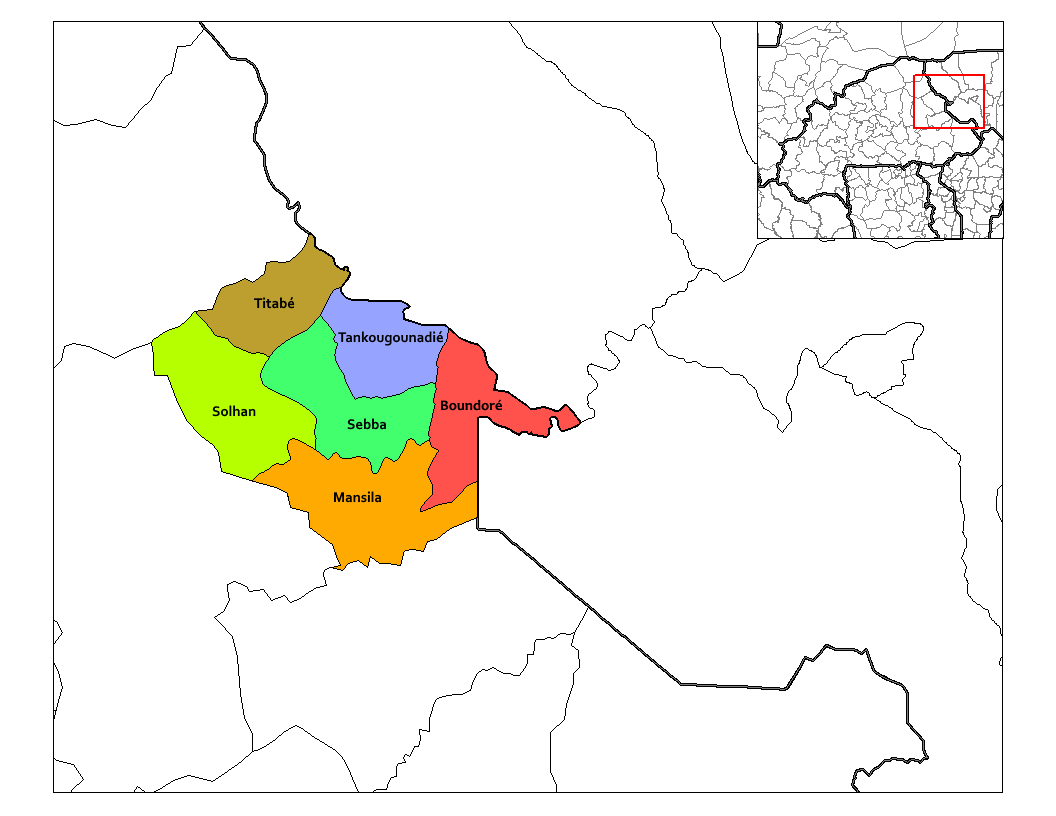
- Mansila Department location in the province
- Country: Burkina Faso
- Region: Plateau-Central Region
- Province: Yagha Province

Area
  - Total: 551 sq mi (1,426 km^{2})

Population (2019 census)
  - Total: 25,065
  - Density: 45.52/sq mi (17.58/km^{2})
- Time zone: UTC+0 (GMT 0)

Mansila is a department or commune of Yagha Province in Burkina Faso.
