= Sebba (department) =

- Department
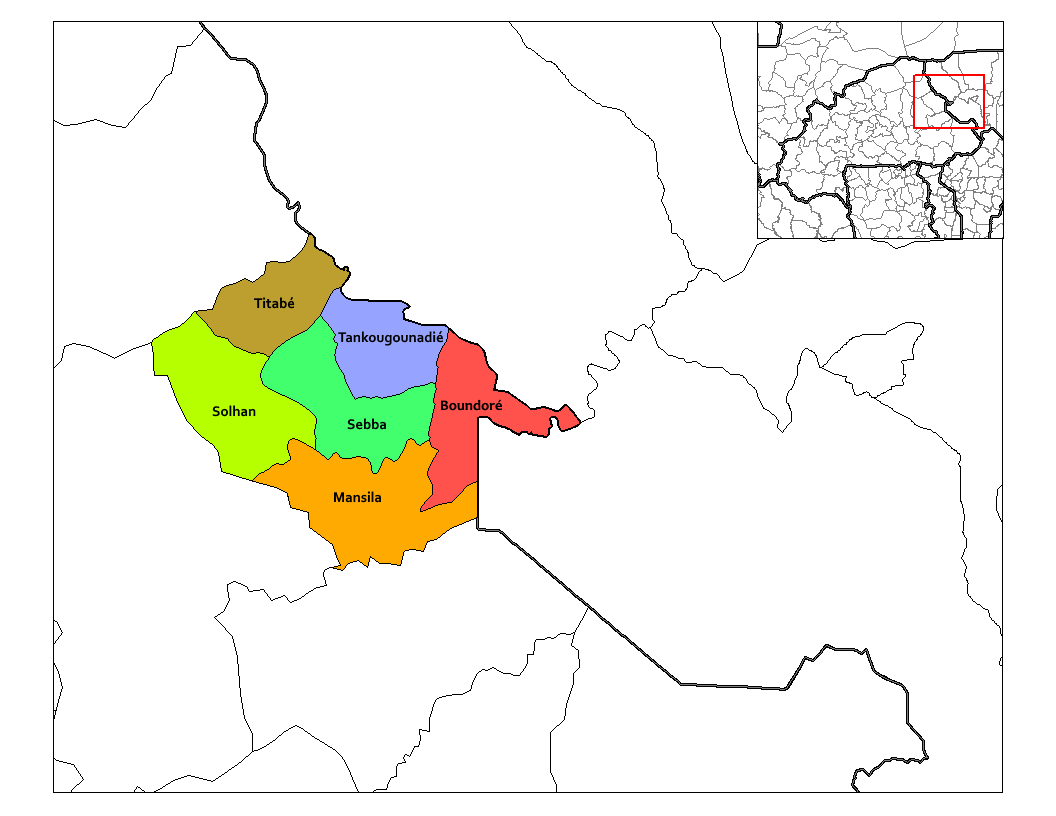
- Sebba Department location in the province
- Country: Burkina Faso
- Region: Plateau-Central Region
- Province: Yagha Province

Area
  - Department: 414 sq mi (1,072 km^{2})

Population (2019 census)
  - Department: 34,763
  - Density: 83.99/sq mi (32.43/km^{2})
  - Urban: 11,298
- Time zone: UTC+0 (GMT 0)

Sebba is a department or commune of Yagha Province in Burkina Faso. Its capital is the town of Sebba.
