= Bilbalogo =

- Village
- Location in Burkina Faso
- Coordinates: 11°55′N 1°20′W
- Country: Burkina Faso
- Region: Centre-Sud Region
- Province: Bazèga Province
- Department: Kombissiri Department

Population (2019)
  - Total: 564

Bilbalogo is a village in the Kombissiri Department of Bazèga Province in central Burkina Faso.

Population
Year	Pop.	±%
1985	701	—
2006	755	+7.7%
2019	564	−25.3%
