= Komki-Ipala Department =

Coordinates: 12.1833°N 1.8000°W

Komki-Ipala
- Department
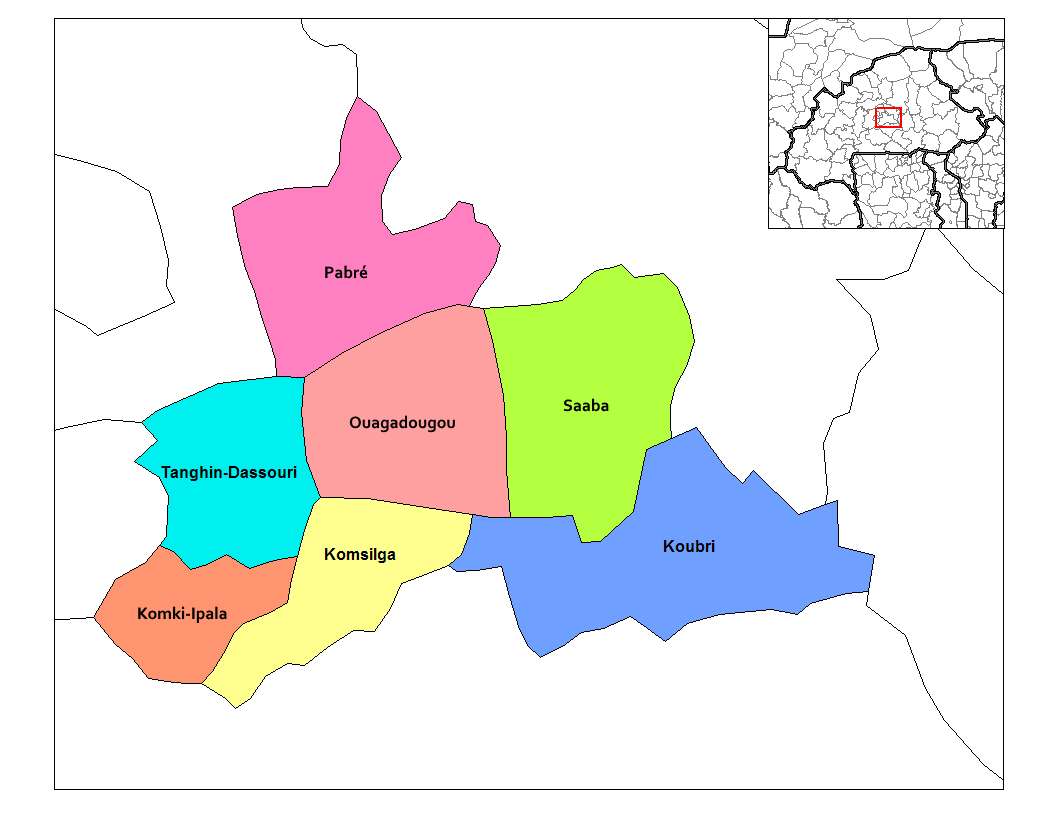
- Komki-Ipala Department location in the province
- Country: Burkina Faso
- Province: Kadiogo Province

Area
  - Total: 85.4 sq mi (221.1 km^{2})

Population (2019 census)
  - Total: 22,553
  - Density: 264.2/sq mi (102.0/km^{2})
- Time zone: UTC+0 (GMT 0)

Komki-Ipala is a department (or commune) of Kadiogo Province in central Burkina Faso. Its capital is the town of Komki-Ipala.
