= Bartiébougou Department =

Bartiébougou
- Department
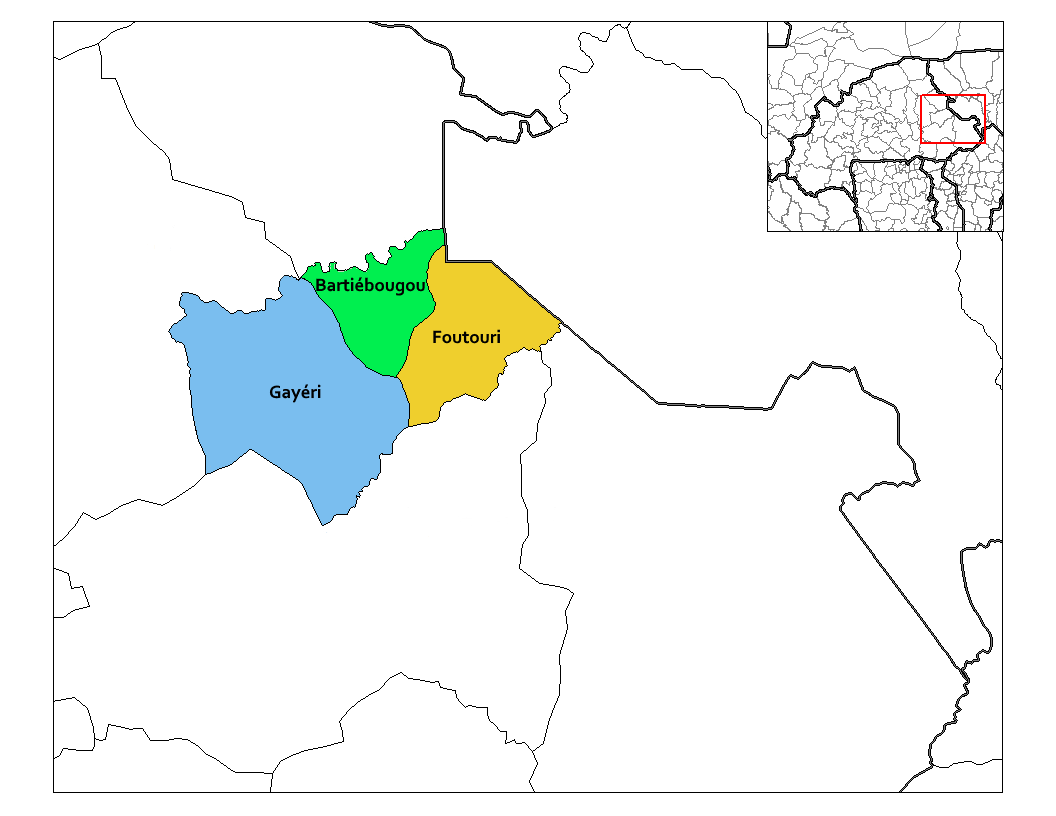
- Bartiébougou Department location in the province
- Country: Burkina Faso
- Region: Centre-Sud Region
- Province: Komondjari Province

Population (2012)
  - Total: 16,067
- Time zone: UTC+0 (GMT 0)

Bartiébougou is a department or commune of Komondjari Province in Burkina Faso.

As of 2012, its population was 16,067.

== Cities ==
The department consists of a chief town :

- Bartiébougou

and 11 villages:

- Bartiébougou-Fulani
- Bontégou
- Bossongri
- Gourel-Cowpea
- Haaba
- Kienkièga
- Paagou
- Paagou-Fulani
- Penkatougou
- Tambiga
- Tambissonguima.
