= Gorgadji massacre =

Part of the Jihadist insurgency in Burkina Faso

Coordinates: 14.229°N 0.866°W

- Part of the Jihadist insurgency in Burkina Faso
- Location: near Gorgadji Department, Seno Province, Burkina Faso
- Date: 18 August 2021
- Deaths: 80+: 6 VDP; 15 gendarmes; 59 civilians
- Injuries: ~30
- Perpetrator: Unknown

On August 18, 2021, unknown jihadists attacked a civilian convoy and its military patrol near Gorgadji, Burkina Faso, killing at least 80 people, 59 of whom were civilians. Dozens of jihadists were killed in a retaliatory attack by the Burkinabe government.

== Background ==
Since 2019, northern Burkina Faso has been embroiled in two jihadist insurgencies by the Islamic State in the Greater Sahara and Jama'at Nasr al-Islam wal-Muslimin, both predominantly-Fulani organizations that attack civilians along ethnic and religious lines. The Burkinabe government has increased efforts to combat the insurgencies by recruiting civilian militias known as the Volunteers for the Defense of the Homeland (VDP), although Burkinabe forces and VDP have been accused of killing Fulani civilians en masse. In early April 2021, jihadists killed ten VDP in Gorgadji, Séno Province.

== Massacre ==
The attack was carried out on a civilian convoy guarded by Burkinabe military patrols, and took place around 25 kilometers from Gorgadji, near the borders of Niger and Mali. A statement by the Burkinabe government mentioned that the civilians were headed to Arbinda when they were attacked. Six VDP militiamen, fifteen gendarmes, and fifty-nine civilians were killed in the massacre, according to the Burkinabe government. The Burkinabe government also stated that between 58 and 80 jihadists were killed in retaliatory attacks with others fleeing, but this could not be confirmed. Around thirty people were wounded in the jihadist attack as well.

The Burkinabe government decreed a period of national mourning for three days following the attack.
