= Moétenga =

Town in Centre, Burkina Faso

- Rural commune
- Location in Burkina Faso
- Coordinates: 12°42′50.4″N 1°41′19.8″W
- Country: Burkina Faso
- Region: Plateau-Central Region
- Province: Kourweogo Province
- Department: Toeghin Department

Population (2019)
  - Total: 1,164

Moétenga is a populated place located in the Toeghin Department, Kourweogo Province, Plateau-Central Region in Burkina Faso.
