= Tanghin, Méguet =

Tanghin
- Location in Burkina Faso
- Coordinates: 12°21′N 0°39′W
- Country: Burkina Faso
- Region: Plateau-Central Region
- Province: Ganzourgou
- Department: Méguet Department

Population (2019)
  - Total: 4,202

Tanghin is a town in the Méguet Department of Ganzourgou Province in central Burkina Faso.

Population
| Year | Pop. | ±% |
|---|---|---|
| 1985 | 2,443 | — |
| 2006 | 3,216 | +31.6% |
| 2019 | 4,202 | +30.7% |
