= Solhan Department =

Department in Yagha Province, Burkina Faso

Solhan
- Department
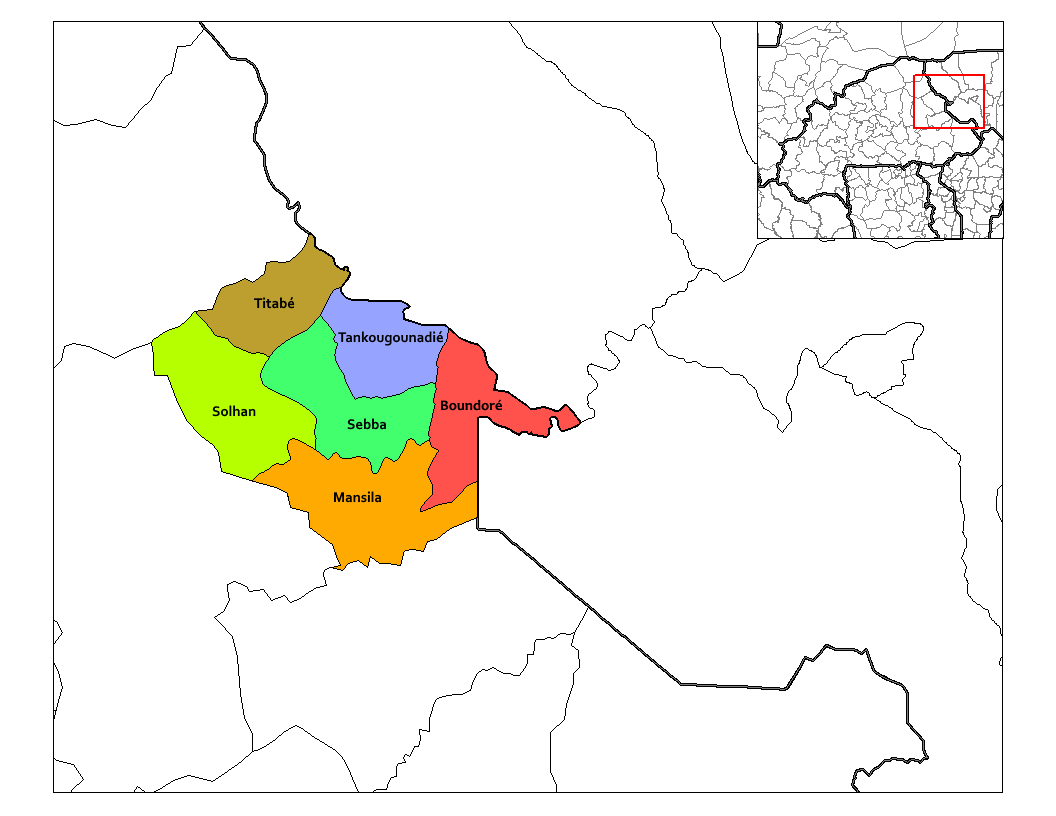
- Solhan Department location in the province
- Country: Burkina Faso
- Region: Sahel Region
- Province: Yagha Province

Area
  - Total: 517 sq mi (1,338 km^{2})

Population (2019 census)
  - Total: 35,966
  - Density: 69.62/sq mi (26.88/km^{2})
- Time zone: UTC+0 (GMT 0)

Solhan is a department or commune of Yagha Province in the Sahel Region of northern Burkina Faso.

A massacre occurred in Solhan in June 2021, killing over 100 civilians.
