= Saaba =

Saaba Saba
- Interactive map of Saaba
- Country: Burkina Faso
- Region: Centre-Est Region
- Province: Boulgou Province
- Department: Boussouma Department

Population (2019)
  - Total: 2,743

Saaba is a town in the Boussouma Department of Boulgou Province in south-eastern Burkina Faso.

Population
Year	Pop.	±%
1985	1,318	—
2006	1,344	+2.0%
2019	2,743	+104.1%
