= Sankouissi, Toece =

Sankouissi
- Country: Burkina Faso
- Region: Centre-Sud Region
- Province: Bazèga Province
- Department: Toece Department

Population (2019)
  - Total: 745

Sankouissi is a village in the Toece Department of Bazèga Province in central Burkina Faso.

Population
Year	Pop.	±%
1985	190	—
2006	250	+31.6%
2019	745	+198.0%
