= Tanghin, Boulkiemdé =

Tanghin Tanguin
- Location in Burkina Faso
- Coordinates: 12°15′N 1°59′W
- Country: Burkina Faso
- Region: Centre-Ouest Region
- Province: Boulkiemdé Province
- Department: Bingo Department

Population (2019)
  - Total: 1,924
- Time zone: UTC+0 (GMT 0)

Tanghin is a town in the Bingo Department of Boulkiemdé Province in central western Burkina Faso.

Population
Year	Pop.	±%
1985	1,373	—
2006	1,392	+1.4%
2019	1,924	+38.2%
