= Pabré Department =

Coordinates: 12°30′N 1°34′W

Pabre
- Department
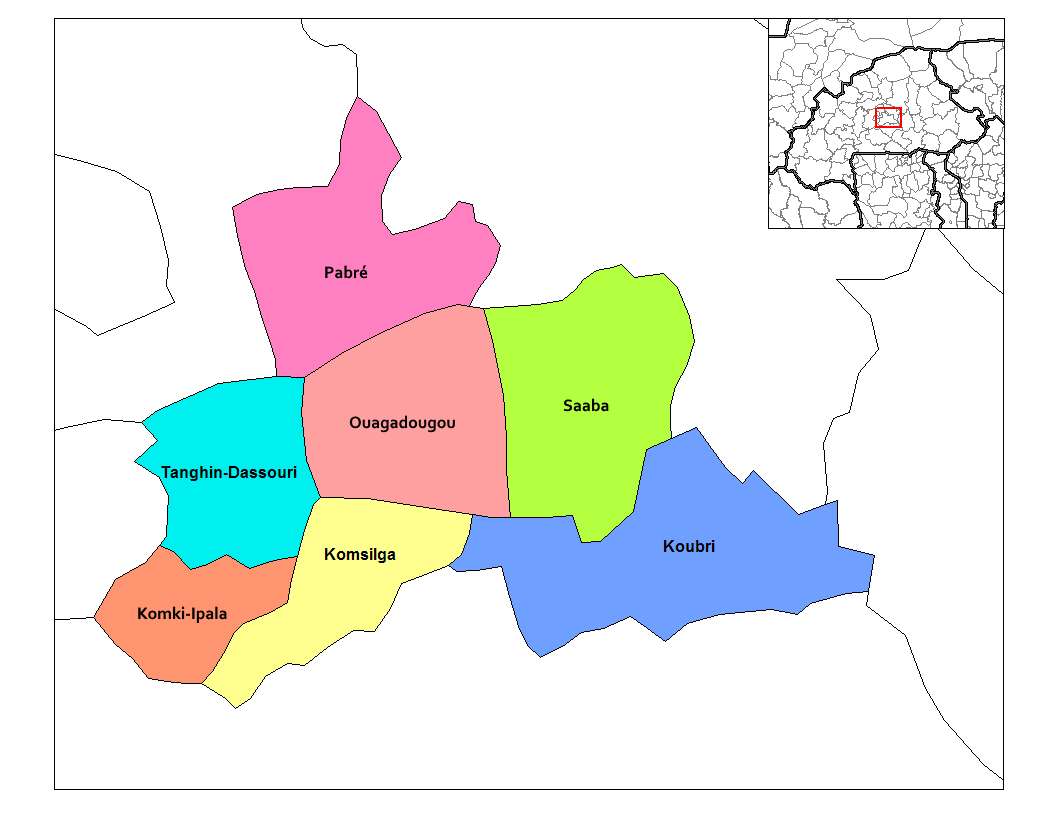
- Pabre Department location in the province
- Country: Burkina Faso
- Province: Kadiogo Province

Area
  - Total: 157.7 sq mi (408.4 km^{2})

Population (2019 census)
  - Total: 40,387
  - Density: 256.1/sq mi (98.89/km^{2})
- Time zone: UTC+0 (GMT 0)

Pabre is a department or commune of Kadiogo Province in central Burkina Faso. Its capital lies at the town of Pabre.

== Towns and villages ==
Pabré department is composed of 21 villages.

- Bendatoèga
- Bidougou
- Bigtogo
- Bilgo
- Dabare
- Gaskaye
- Goupana
- Katabtenga
- Koankin
- Kodemmtore
- Napamboum
- Nédogo
- Pabré Centre
- Pabré Saint Joseph
- Sanbtenga
- Saag-Nionniongo
- Sallé
- Wouavougué
- Yamba
- Zibako
- Zouma
