= Koubri Department =

Coordinates: 12°12′33″N 1°21′01″W

Koubri
- Department
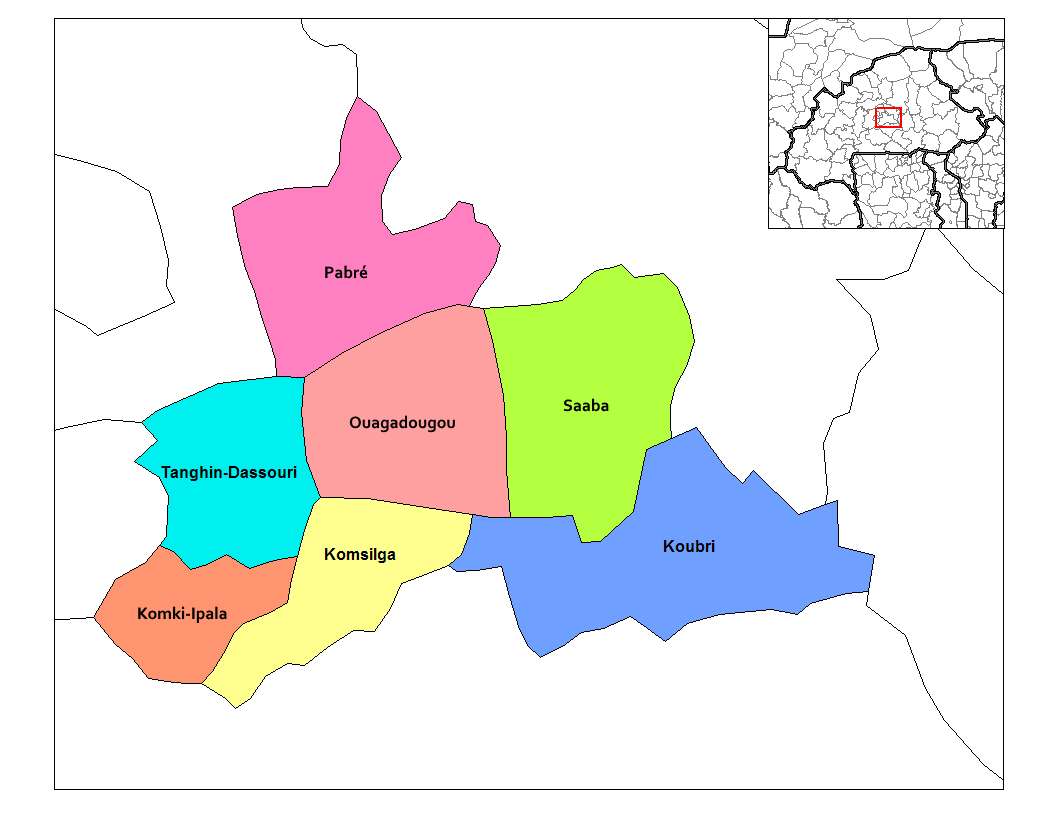
- Koubri Department location in the province
- Country: Burkina Faso
- Province: Kadiogo Province

Area
  - Total: 246.3 sq mi (637.8 km^{2})

Population (2019 census)
  - Total: 60,817
  - Density: 247.0/sq mi (95.35/km^{2})
- Time zone: UTC+0 (GMT 0)

Koubri is a department or commune of Kadiogo Province in central Burkina Faso. Its capital lies at the town of Koubri.
