= Tanghin, Saponé =

Tanghin
- Location in Burkina Faso
- Coordinates: 12°1′35″N 1°27′23″W
- Country: Burkina Faso
- Region: Centre-Sud Region
- Province: Bazèga Province
- Department: Saponé Department

Population (2019)
  - Total: 713

Tanghin is a town in the Saponé Department of Bazèga Province in central Burkina Faso.

Population
Year	Pop.	±%
1985	1,270	—
2006	1,266	−0.3%
2019	713	−43.7%
