= Tanghin, Toece =

Tanghin
- Location in Burkina Faso
- Coordinates: 11°50′N 1°21′W
- Country: Burkina Faso
- Region: Centre-Sud Region
- Province: Bazèga Province
- Department: Toece Department

Population (2019)
  - Total: 875

Tanghin, Toece is a village in the Toece Department of Bazèga Province in central Burkina Faso.

Population
Year	Pop.	±%
1985	548	—
2006	796	+45.3%
2019	875	+9.9%
