= Sebba =

- Location within Burkina Faso, West Africa
- Coordinates: 13°26′21″N 0°31′44″E
- Country: Burkina Faso
- Regions: Sahel Region
- Province: Yagha Province
- Department: Sebba Department

Population (2019 census)
  - Total: 11,298
- Time zone: UTC+0 (GMT)
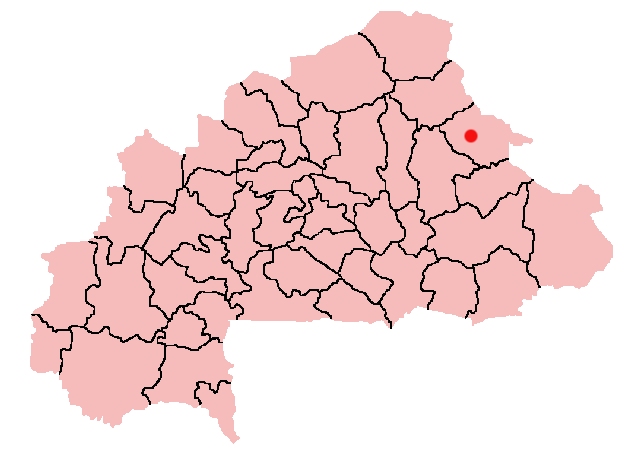
- Location of Sebba in Burkina Faso

Sebba is a town located in the province of Yagha in Burkina Faso. It is the capital of Yagha Province.

The mayor of Sebba is Hama Amirou Ly, of the Party for Democracy and Socialism.
