= Koakin, Kombissiri =

Koakin
- Location in Burkina Faso
- Coordinates: 11°57′N 1°21′W
- Country: Burkina Faso
- Region: Centre-Sud Region
- Province: Bazèga Province
- Department: Kombissiri Department

Population (2019)
  - Total: 292

Koakin is a village in the Kombissiri Department of Bazèga Province in central Burkina Faso.

Population
Year	Pop.	±%
1985	320	—
2006	319	−0.3%
2019	292	−8.5%
