= Tanghin, Boudry =

Tanghin
- Location in Burkina Faso
- Coordinates: 12°14′N 0°48′W
- Country: Burkina Faso
- Region: Plateau-Central Region
- Province: Ganzourgou
- Department: Boudry Department

Population (2019)
  - Total: 1,438

Tanghin is a village in the Boudry Department of Ganzourgou Province in central Burkina Faso.

Population
Year	Pop.	±%
1985	264	—
2006	501	+89.8%
2019	1,438	+187.0%
