= Tanghin, Zoungou =

Tanghin
- Location in Burkina Faso
- Coordinates: 12°8′N 0°34′W
- Country: Burkina Faso
- Region: Plateau-Central Region
- Province: Ganzourgou
- Department: Zoungou Department

Population (2019)
  - Total: 1,940

Tanghin is a town in the Zoungou Department of Ganzourgou Province in central Burkina Faso.

Population
Year	Pop.	±%
1985	1,768	—
2006	1,233	−30.3%
2019	1,940	+57.3%
