= Koakin, Saponé =

Coordinates: 12°03′52″N 1°26′31″E

Koakin
- Interactive map of Koakin
- Country: Burkina Faso
- Region: Centre-Sud Region
- Province: Bazèga Province
- Department: Saponé Department

Population (2019)
  - Total: 628

Koakin is a village in the Saponé Department of Bazèga Province in central Burkina Faso.

Population
Year	Pop.	±%
2006	594	—
2019	628	+5.7%
