= Komsilga Department =

Coordinates: 12.1809°N 1.6308°W

Komsilga
- Department
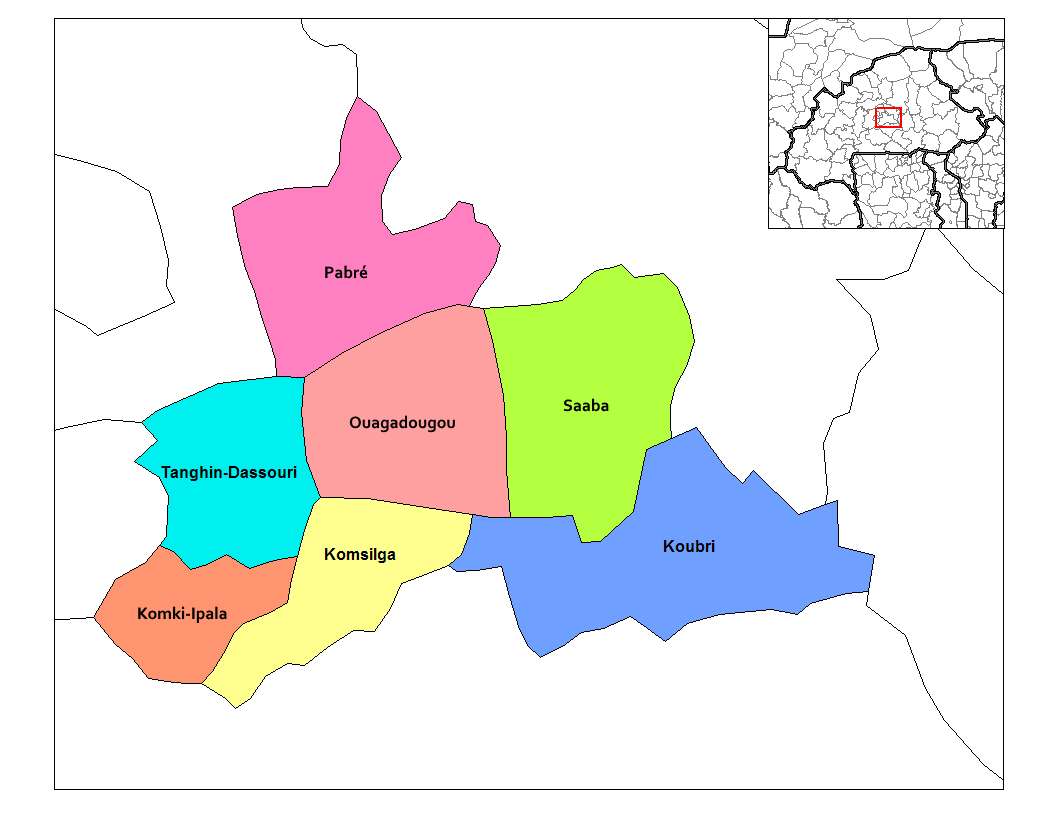
- Komsliga Department location in the province
- Country: Burkina Faso
- Province: Kadiogo Province

Area
  - Total: 122.6 sq mi (317.5 km^{2})

Population (2019)
  - Total: 137,278
  - Density: 1,120/sq mi (432.4/km^{2})
- Time zone: UTC+0 (GMT 0)

Komsilga is a department or commune of Kadiogo Province in central Burkina Faso. The population was 137,278 in 2019.

== Towns and villages ==
The department's capital lies at the town of Komsilga.
