= Tanghin-Dassouri Department =

Coordinates: 12°16′10″N 1°42′55″W

Tanghin-Dassouri
- Department
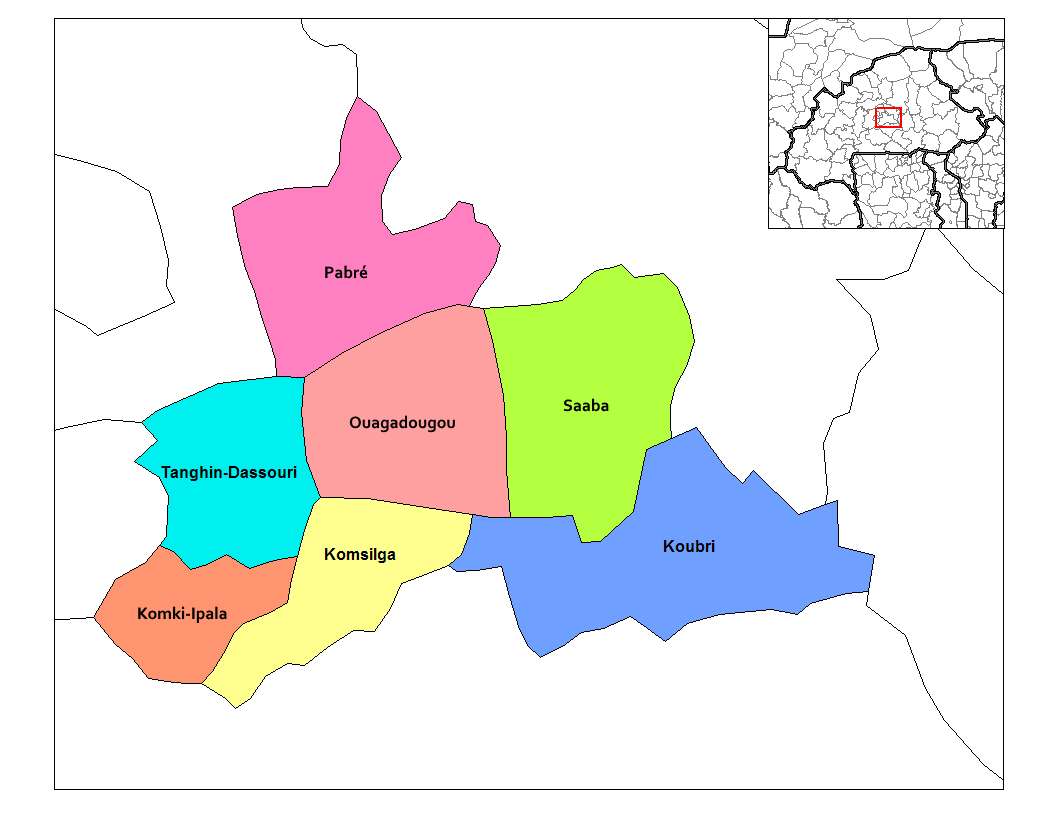
- Tanghin-Dassouri Department location in the province
- Country: Burkina Faso
- Province: Kadiogo Province

Area
  - Total: 122.2 sq mi (316.5 km^{2})

Population (2019 census)
  - Total: 68,848
  - Density: 563.4/sq mi (217.5/km^{2})
- Time zone: UTC+0 (GMT 0)

Tanghin-Dassouri is a department or commune of Kadiogo Province in central Burkina Faso. Its capital lies at the town of Tanghin-Dassouri.

== International relations ==
=== Twin towns – Sister cities ===
Tanghin-Dassouri is twinned with:

- Belfort, France
