= Yagha Province =

Coordinates: 13°25′N 0°35′E

Yagha
- Province
- Location in Burkina Faso
- Country: Burkina Faso
- Region: Sahel Region
- Capital: Sebba

Area
  - Province: 6,457 km^{2} (2,493 sq mi)

Population (2019 census)
  - Province: 169,024
  - Density: 26.18/km^{2} (67.80/sq mi)
  - Urban: 11,298
- Time zone: UTC+0 (GMT 0)

Yagha is one of the 45 provinces of Burkina Faso, located in its Sahel Region.

Its capital is Sebba.

In February 2020, 24 civilians were killed and three were kidnapped near a Protestant church in Pansi, Yagha Province.

== Departments ==
Yagha is divided into 6 departments:

The Departments of Yagha
Department	Capital city	Population (Census 2006)
Boundoré Department	Boundoré	22,807
Mansila Department	Mansila	42,787
Sebba Department	Sebba	32,374
Solhan Department	Solhan	25,512
Tankougounadié Department	Tankougounadié	16,486
Titabé Department	Titabé	19,910
