= Saaba Department =

Coordinates: 12°22′37″N 1°25′15″W

Saaba
- Department
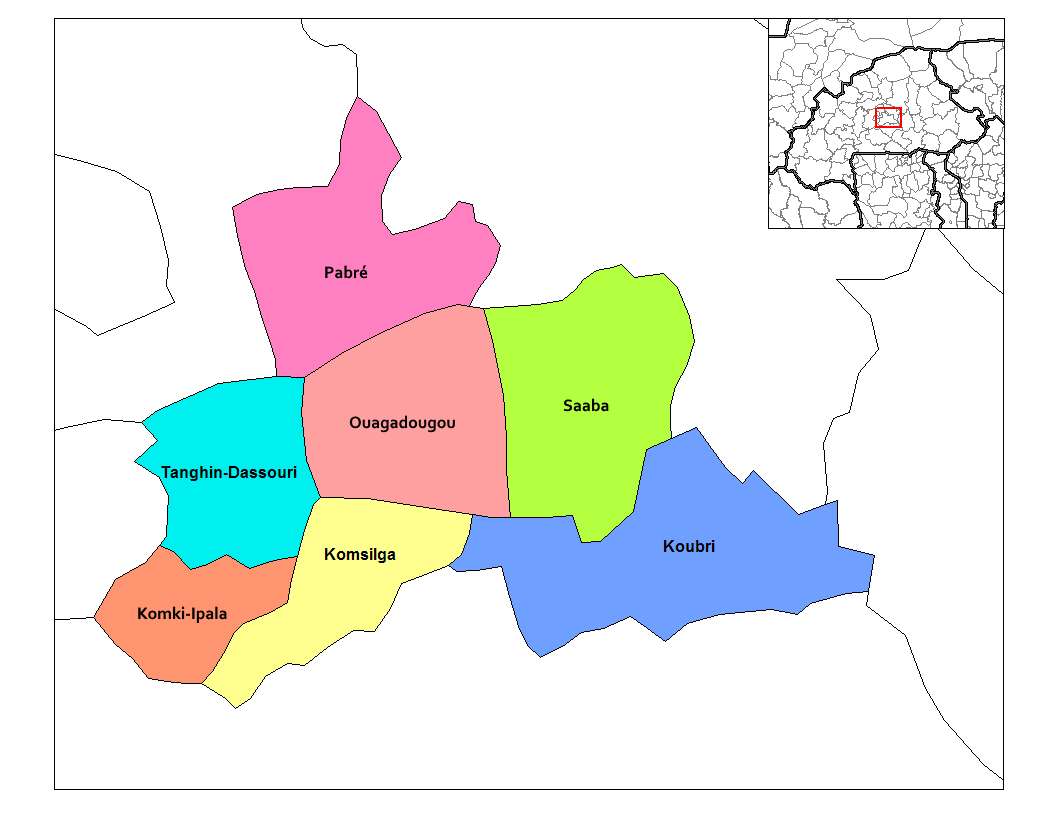
- Saaba Department location in the province
- Country: Burkina Faso
- Province: Kadiogo Province

Area
  - Total: 245.9 sq mi (636.8 km^{2})

Population (2019)
  - Total: 285,235
  - Density: 1,160/sq mi (447.9/km^{2})
- Time zone: UTC+0 (GMT 0)

Saaba is a department or commune of Kadiogo Province in central Burkina Faso. Its capital lies at the town of Saaba.
