= Kadiogo Province =

Kadiogo
- Province
- Location in Burkina Faso

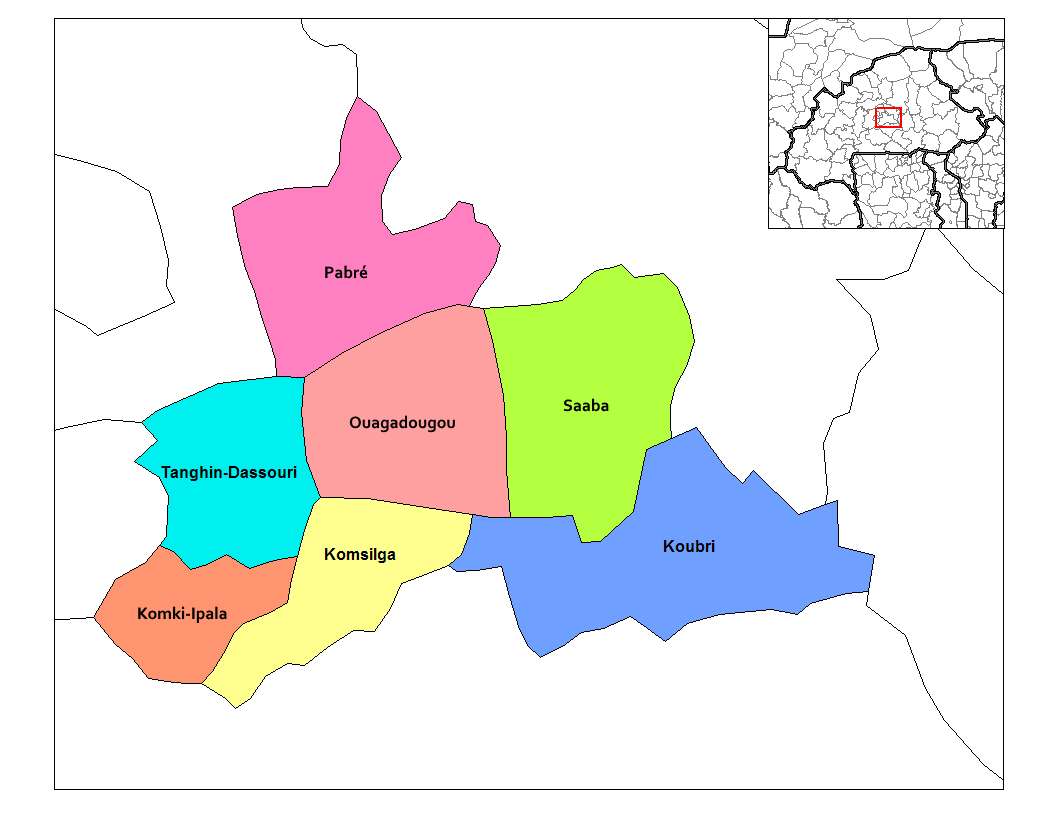
- Provincial map of its departments
- Coordinates: 12°20′N 1°30′W
- Country: Burkina Faso
- Region: Centre Region
- Capital: Ouagadougou

Area
  - Province: 2,805 km^{2} (1,083 sq mi)

Population (2024 est.)
  - Province: 3,623,784
  - Density: 1,292/km^{2} (3,346/sq mi)
  - Urban: 2,453,496
- Time zone: UTC+0 (GMT 0)

Kadiogo is a province of Burkina Faso, located in its Centre Region. Its area is of 2,805 km^{2}, containing six departments and a population of 3,032,668 (2019). Its capital is also the state capital, Ouagadougou. It features the central plateau of the country. It is highly urbanized and is both the most populated and the most densely populated province.

== Departments ==
Kadiogo is divided into seven departments:

The Departments of Kadiogo
Department	Capital city	Area in km^{2}	Population (Census 2006)	Population (Census 2019)
Ouagadougou Department	Ouagadougou	519.8	1,475,223	2,453,496
Komki-Ipala Department	Komki-Ipala	221.1	20,562	22,556
Komsilga Department	Komsilga	317.5	53,108	101,193
Koubri Department	Koubri	637.8	43,928	60,802
Pabré Department	Pabré	408.4	27,896	40,713
Saaba Department	Saaba	447.9	50,885	285,081
Tanghin-Dassouri Department	Tanghin-Dassouri	316.5	55,172	68,827

== See also ==
- Regions of Burkina Faso
- Provinces of Burkina Faso
- Departments of Burkina Faso
