= Kadiogo Region =

Region of Burkina Faso

Kadiogo Centre
- Regions
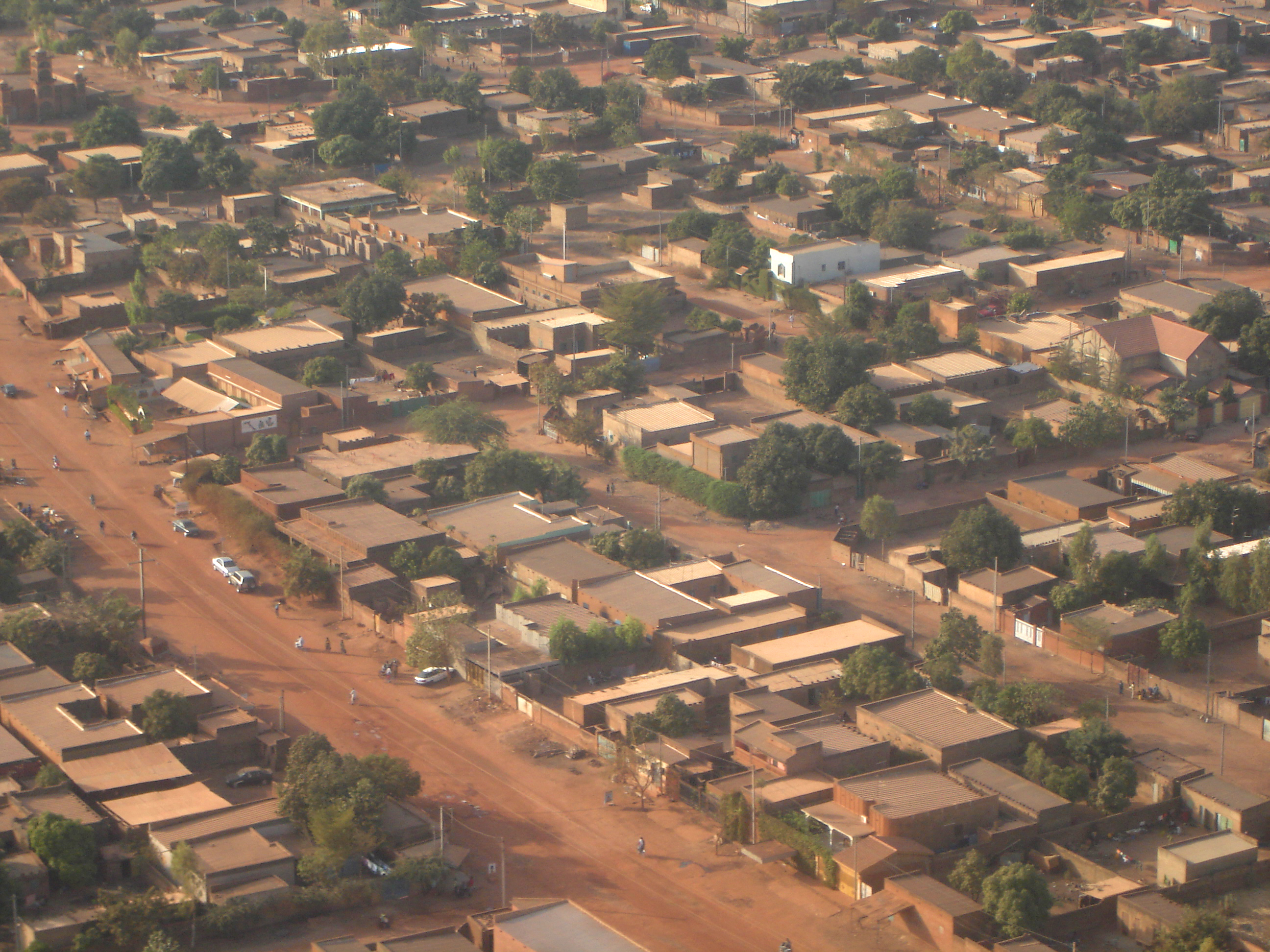
- Aerial view of Ouagadougou

- Location in Burkina Faso
- Coordinates: 12°20′N 1°30′W
- Country: Burkina Faso
- Capital: Ouagadougou

Area
  - Regions: 1,083 sq mi (2,805 km^{2})

Population (2019 census)
  - Regions: 3,030,384
  - Density: 2,798/sq mi (1,080/km^{2})
  - Urban: 2,453,496
- Time zone: UTC+0 (GMT 0)
- HDI (2017): 0.612 medium · 1st

Kadiogo, formerly known as Centre [sɑ̃tʁ], is one of Burkina Faso's 17 administrative regions. The population of Kadiogo Region was 1,727,390 at the 2006 census and increased by 75.6% in 13 years to 3,030,384 at the 2019 census (provisional figure), of which 50.8% was female. It is the most populous and urbanised region in Burkina Faso; in 2019, 14.8% of Burkina Faso's population lived in Kadiogo. The region's capital is Ouagadougou, which also serves as the national capital. Kadiogo region consists of only one eponymous province, Kadiogo.

The coverage of cereal need compared to the total production of the region was 17.00%. As of 2007, the literacy rate in the region was 63%, compared to a national average of 28.3%.

== Geography ==
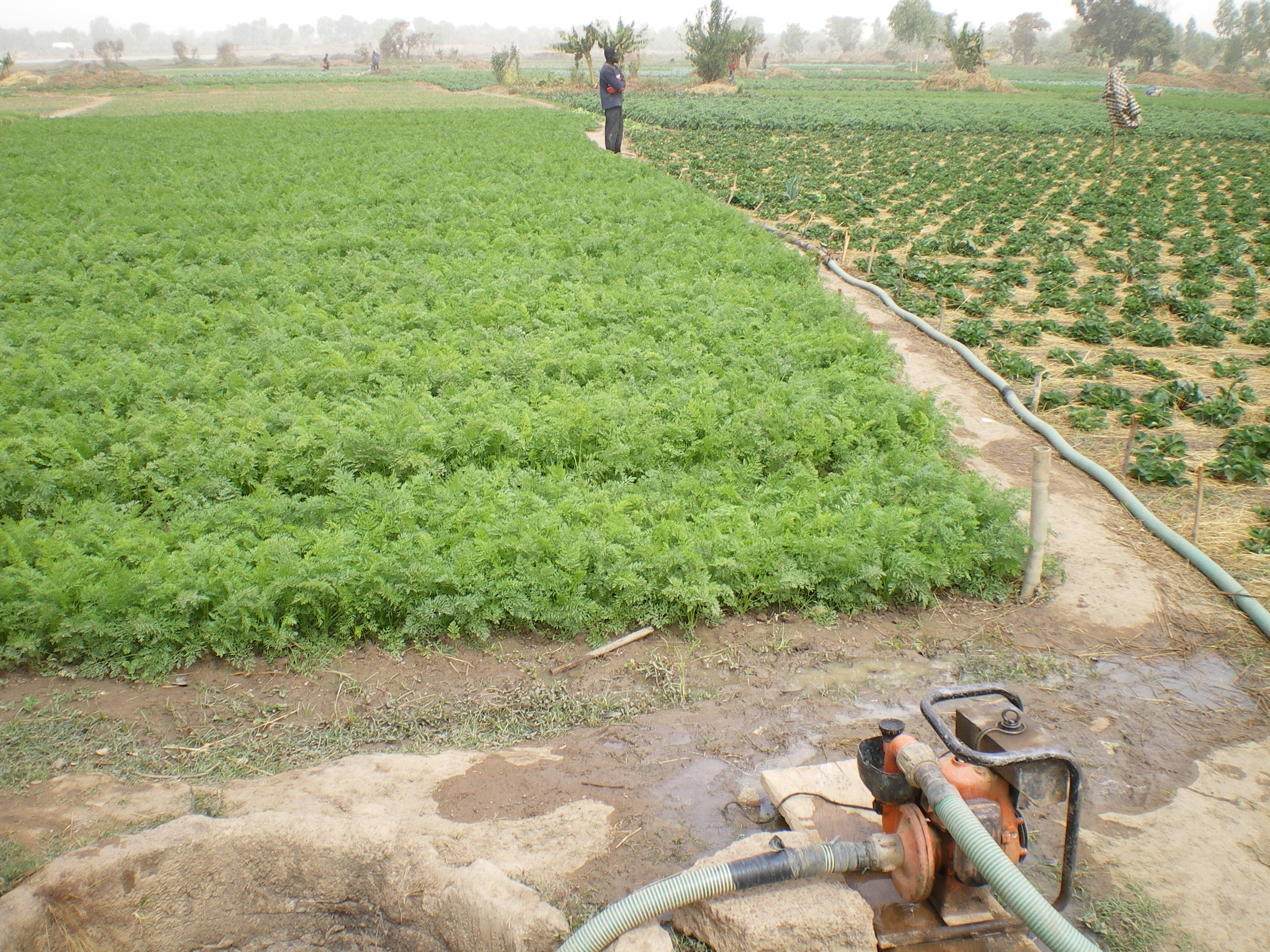
Agricultural fields in the region

Most of Burkina Faso is a wide plateau formed by riverine systems and is called falaise de Banfora. There are three major rivers, the Red Volta, Black Volta and White Volta, which cut through different valleys. The climate is generally hot, with unreliable rains across different seasons. Gold and quartz are common minerals found across the country, while manganese deposits are also common. The dry season is usually from October to May, and rains are common during the wet season from June to September. The soil texture is porous and hence the yield is also poor. The average elevation is around 200 m (660 ft) to 300 m (980 ft) above mean sea level. Among West African countries, Burkina Faso has the largest elephant population, and the country is replete with game reserves. The northern regions are generally arid and usually have scrub land and semi-deserts. The principal river is the Red Volta, that originates in the northern region and drains into Ghana. The areas near the rivers usually have flies like tsetse and similium, which are carriers of sleep sickness and river blindness. The average rainfall in the region is around 25 cm (9.8 in) compared to southern regions that receive only 100 cm (39 in) rainfall.

== Demographics ==
Historical population
Year	Pop.	±% p.a.
1985	640,108	—
1996	941,894	+3.57%
2006	1,727,390	+6.25%
2019	3,032,668	+4.42%

As of 2019, the population of the region was 3,032,668 with 50.8% females. The population in the region was 14.8% of the total population of the country. The child mortality rate was 35, infant mortality rate was 47 and the mortality of children under five was 80. As of 2007, among the working population, there were 47.8% employees, 14.5% under employed, 31.6% inactive people, 37.8% not working and 6.2% unemployed people in the region.

== Economy ==
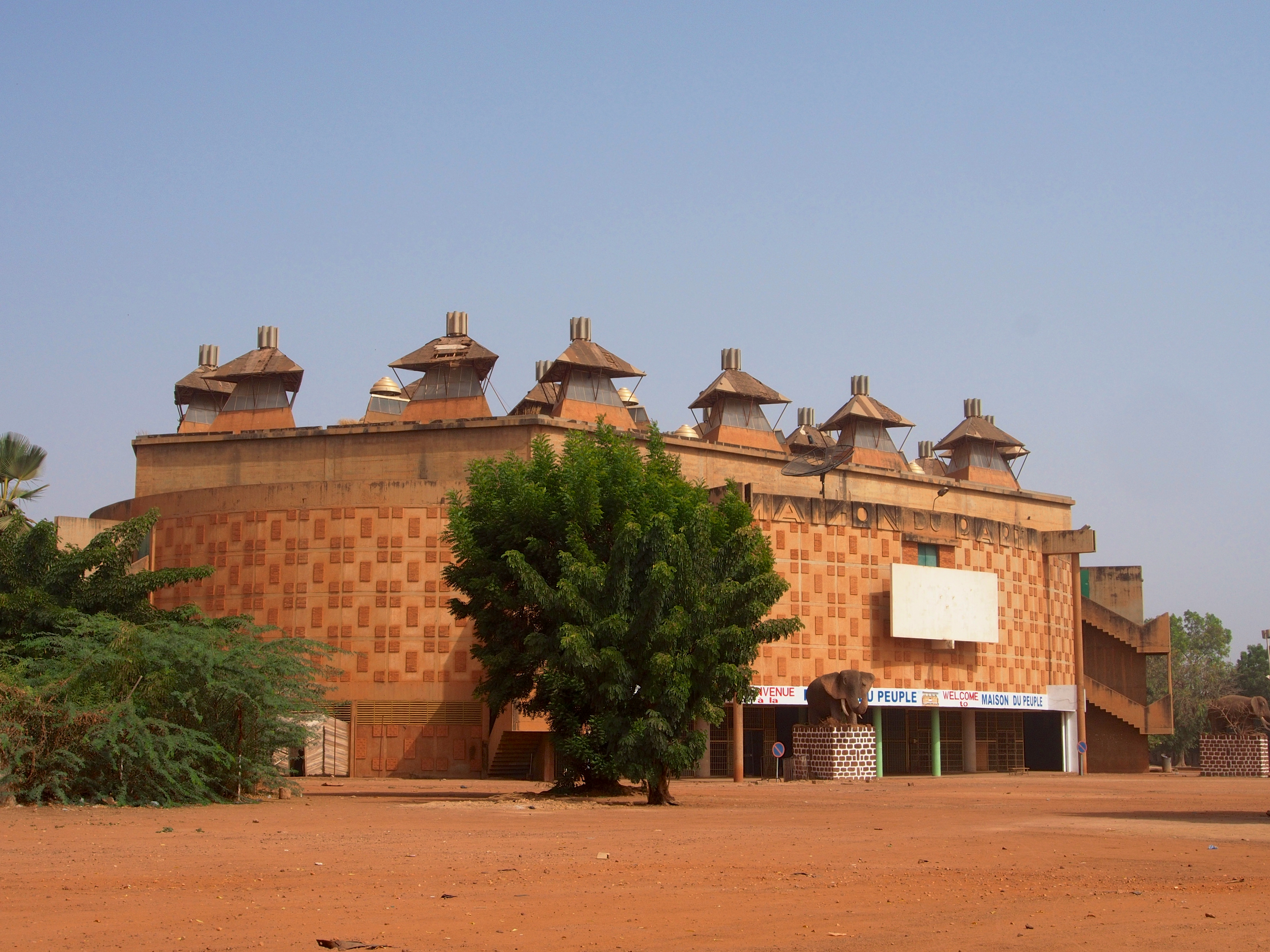
Ouagadougou Maison du people

As of 2007, the literacy rate in the region was 63 per cent, compared to a national average of 28.3 per cent. The gross primary enrolment was 84.8 per cent, pos-primary was 51.8 per cent and gross secondary school enrolment was 27.5. There were 8660 boys and 8781 girls enrolled in the primary and post-secondary level. There were 508 teachers in primary & post-secondary level, while there were 4969 teachers in post-primary and post-secondary level. Adult (15+) literacy in the region increased from 55% in 2003 to 63% in 2007. In 2011 the region had 869 primary schools and 354 secondary schools (25% of the national total). The University of Ouagadougou is also located in the region and had around 40,000 students in 2010 (83% of the national population of university students).

As of 2007, there were 162 km (101 mi) of highways, 134.6 km (83.6 mi) of regional roads and 7 km (4.3 mi) of county roads. The first set of car traffic was 5554, first set of two-wheeler traffic was 32,587 and the total classified road network was 304. The region is junction for many of the nation's roads and is the terminus of the only railway in the country. Ouagadougou International Airport is located in the region and as of June 2014 the airport had regularly scheduled flights to most major cities in West Africa as well as Paris, Brussels and Istanbul. The total corn produced during 2015 was 47,395 tonnes, cotton was 000 tonnes, cowpea was 14,060 tonnes, ground nut was 9,288 tonnes, millet was 15,712 tonnes, rice was 7,531 tonnes and sorghum was 29,971 tonnes. The coverage of cereal need compared to the total production of the region was 17.00 per cent.

== Administrative Areas ==
The Province of Centre Region (the Region comprises a single province)
Province	Capital	Population (Census 2019)
Kadiogo Province	Ouagadougou	3,032,668

Burkina Faso gained independence from France in 1960. It was originally called Upper Volta. There have been military coups until 1983 when Captain Thomas Sankara took control and implemented radical left wing policies. He was ousted by Blaise Compaore, who continued for 27 years until 2014, when a popular uprising ended his rule. As per Law No.40/98/AN in 1998, Burkina Faso adhered to decentralization to provide administrative and financial autonomy to local communities. There are 13 administrative regions, each governed by a governor. The regions are subdivided into 45 provinces, which are further subdivided into 351 communes. The communes may be urban or rural and are interchangeable. There are other administrative entities like department and village. An urban commune has typically 10,000 people under it. If any commune is not able to get 75 per cent of its planned budget in revenues for 3 years, the autonomy is taken off. The communes are administered by elected mayors. The communes are stipulated to develop economic, social and cultural values of its citizens. A commune has financial autonomy and can interact with other communes, government agencies or international entities.
