= Zitenga Department =

Coordinates: 12°44′57″N 1°18′37″W

Zitenga
- Department
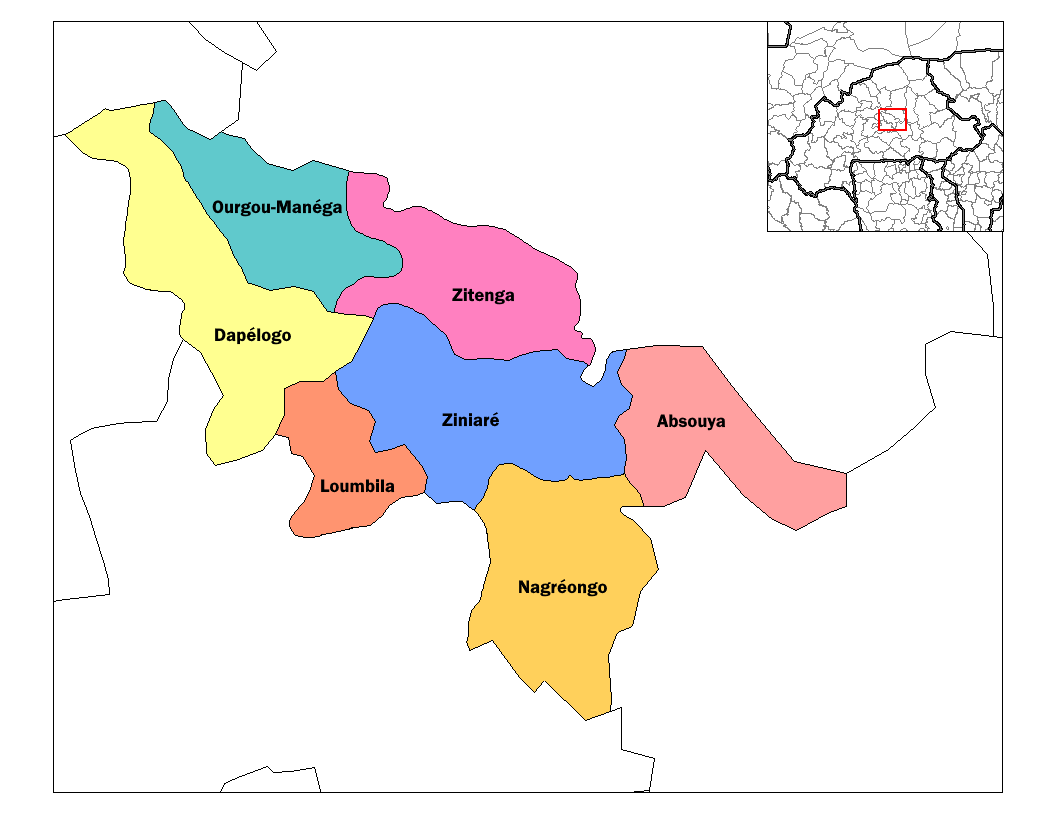
- Zitenga Department location in the province
- Country: Burkina Faso
- Province: Oubritenga Province

Area
  - Total: 177.5 sq mi (459.6 km^{2})

Population (2019 census)
  - Total: 50,162
  - Density: 282.7/sq mi (109.1/km^{2})
- Time zone: UTC+0 (GMT 0)

Zitenga is a department or commune of Oubritenga Province in northern-central Burkina Faso. Its capital lies at the town of Zitenga. According to the 1996 census the department has a total population of 40,773.

== Towns and villages ==
- Zitenga (644 inhabitants) (capital)
- Andem (1 798 inhabitants)
- Bagtenga (913 inhabitants)
- Barkoundouba-Mossi (716 inhabitants)
- Bendogo (644 inhabitants)
- Bissiga-Mossi (597 inhabitants)
- Bissiga- Yarcé (1 700 inhabitants)
- Boalla (494 inhabitants)
- Dayagretenga (981 inhabitants)
- Dimianema (1 056 inhabitants)
- Itaoré (504 inhabitants)
- Kogmasgo (448 inhabitants)
- Kolgdiessé (410 inhabitants)
- kologkom (422 inhabitants)
- Komnogo (176 inhabitants)
- Lallé (1 015 inhabitants)
- Leléxé (1 280 inhabitants)
- Lemnogo (1 409 inhabitants)
- Nagtaoli (281 inhabitants)
- Nambéguian (704 inhabitants)
- Nioniokodogo Mossi (375 inhabitants)
- Nioniokodogo peulh (1 122 inhabitants)
- Nioniopalogo (669 inhabitants)
- Nonghin (1 237 inhabitants)
- Ouatinoma (964 inhabitants)
- Pedemtenga (1 316 inhabitants)
- Poédogo (419 inhabitants)
- Sadaba (3 788 inhabitants)
- Samtenga (401 inhabitants)
- Souka (528 inhabitants)
- Tamasgo (1 127 inhabitants)
- Tampanga (312 inhabitants)
- Tampelga (1 084 inhabitants)
- Tampouy-Silmimossé (124 inhabitants)
- Tampouy-Yarcé (1 203 inhabitants)
- Tanghin (989 inhabitants)
- Tanghin Kossodo peulh (336 inhabitants)
- Tankounga (2 009 inhabitants)
- Tanlili (1 696 inhabitants)
- Tiba (477 inhabitants)
- Toanda (1 039 inhabitants)
- Yamana (1 222 inhabitants)
- Yanga (354 inhabitants)
- Yargo (871 inhabitants)
- Zakin (573 inhabitants)
- Zéguédéguin (346 inhabitants)
