= Zorgo, Kogho =

Zorgo
- Country: Burkina Faso
- Region: Plateau-Central Region
- Province: Ganzourgou
- Department: Kogho Department

Population (2019)
  - Total: 988

Zorgo is a village in the Kogho Department of Ganzourgou Province in central Burkina Faso.

Population
| Year | Pop. | ±% |
|---|---|---|
| 2006 | 622 | — |
| 2019 | 988 | +58.8% |
