= Paspanga, Ganzourgou =

Paspanga
- Location in Burkina Faso
- Coordinates: 12°7′N 0°27′W
- Country: Burkina Faso
- Region: Plateau-Central Region
- Province: Ganzourgou
- Department: Zoungou Department

Population (2019)
  - Total: 2,011

Paspanga is a village in the Zoungou Department of Ganzourgou Province in central Burkina Faso.

Population
Year	Pop.	±%
1985	891	—
2006	910	+2.1%
2019	2,011	+121.0%
