= Poédogo, Ganzourgou =

Poédogo
- Location in Burkina Faso
- Country: Burkina Faso
- Region: Plateau-Central Region
- Province: Ganzourgou
- Department: Boudry Department

Population (2019)
  - Total: 948

Poédogo is a village in the Boudry Department of Ganzourgou Province in central Burkina Faso.

Population
Year	Pop.	±%
2006	678	—
2019	948	+39.8%
