= Nanom =

- Location in Burkina Faso
- Coordinates: 12°6′N 0°43′W
- Country: Burkina Faso
- Region: Plateau-Central Region
- Province: Ganzourgou
- Department: Boudry Department

Population (2019)
  - Total: 1,080

Nanom is a village in the Boudry Department of Ganzourgou Province in central Burkina Faso.

Population
Year	Pop.	±%
2006	492	—
2019	1,080	+119.5%
