= Nédogo =

- Location in Burkina Faso
- Coordinates: 12°9′N 0°42′W
- Country: Burkina Faso
- Region: Plateau-Central Region
- Province: Ganzourgou
- Department: Boudry Department

Population (2019)
  - Total: 3,829

Nédogo is a town in the Boudry Department of Ganzourgou Province in central Burkina Faso. It is at 12°23'59.8"N 1°34'15.1"W.

Population
Year	Pop.	±%
1985	1,542	—
2006	1,716	+11.3%
2019	3,829	+123.1%
