= Koankin =

- Location in Burkina Faso
- Coordinates: 12°4′N 0°40′W
- Country: Burkina Faso
- Region: Plateau-Central Region
- Province: Ganzourgou
- Department: Boudry Department

Population (2019)
  - Total: 2,377

Koankin is a town in the Boudry Department of Ganzourgou Province in central Burkina Faso.

Population
Year	Pop.	±%
1985	2,245	—
2006	1,733	−22.8%
2019	2,377	+37.2%
