= Dassimpouigo =

Village in central Burkina Faso

Dassimpouigo Dassempouigho
- Country: Burkina Faso
- Region: Plateau-Central Region
- Province: Ganzourgou
- Department: Zam Department

Population (2019)
  - Total: 1,738

Dassimpouigo is a village in the Zam Department of Ganzourgou Province in central Burkina Faso.

Population
Year	Pop.	±%
1985	649	—
2006	1,005	+54.9%
2019	1,738	+72.9%
