= Zoangpighin =

Zoangpighin Zongpighin
- Country: Burkina Faso
- Region: Plateau-Central Region
- Province: Ganzourgou
- Department: Boudry Department

Population (2019)
  - Total: 1,473

Zoangpighin is a village in the Boudry Department of Ganzourgou Province in central Burkina Faso.

Population
Year	Pop.	±%
1985	717	—
2006	990	+38.1%
2019	1,473	+48.8%
