= Taonsgo =

Taonsgo Taonsgho
- Country: Burkina Faso
- Region: Plateau-Central Region
- Province: Ganzourgou
- Department: Boudry Department

Population (2019)
  - Total: 651

Taonsgo is a town in the Boudry Department of Ganzourgou Province in central Burkina Faso.

Population
| Year | Pop. | ±% |
|---|---|---|
| 1985 | 1,206 | — |
| 2006 | 461 | −61.8% |
| 2019 | 651 | +41.2% |
