= Sankango =

- Interactive map of Sankango
- Country: Burkina Faso
- Region: Plateau-Central Region
- Province: Ganzourgou
- Department: Salogo Department

Population (2019)
  - Total: 1,747

Sankango is a town in the Salogo Department of Ganzourgou Province in central Burkina Faso.

Population
| Year | Pop. | ±% |
|---|---|---|
| 1985 | 184 | — |
| 2006 | 1,289 | +600.5% |
| 2019 | 1,747 | +35.5% |
