= Zanrsin =

- Location within Burkina Faso
- Coordinates: 12.2658°N 0.7481°W
- Country: Burkina Faso
- Region: Plateau-Central Region
- Province: Ganzourgou
- Department: Boudry Department

Population (2019)
  - Total: 582

Zanrsin is a village in the Boudry Department of Ganzourgou Province in central Burkina Faso.

Population
Year	Pop.	±%
2006	551	—
2019	582	+5.6%
