= Linonghin =

- Country: Burkina Faso
- Region: Plateau-Central Region
- Province: Ganzourgou
- Department: Kogho Department

Population (2019)
  - Total: 618

Linonghin is a village in the Kogho Department of Ganzourgou Province in central Burkina Faso.

On August 11, 1974, Linonghin was the site of Burkina Faso's deadliest airliner crash. An Ilyushin Il-18V of Air Mali that had diverted to Ouagadougou on a flight to Niamey began circling the wrong town and made a forced landing after running out of fuel. 47 of the 60 on board were killed.

Population
| Year | Pop. | ±% |
|---|---|---|
| 2006 | 446 | — |
| 2019 | 618 | +38.6% |
