= Tangandogo =

- Country: Burkina Faso
- Region: Plateau-Central Region
- Province: Ganzourgou
- Department: Kogho Department

Population (2019)
  - Total: 878

Tangandogo is a village in the Kogho Department of Ganzourgou Province in central Burkina Faso.

Population
Year	Pop.	±%
2006	592	—
2019	878	+48.3%
