= Dawaka =

- Location in Burkina Faso
- Coordinates: 12°53′N 0°54′W
- Country: Burkina Faso
- Region: Plateau-Central Region
- Province: Ganzourgou
- Department: Zam Department

Population (2019)
  - Total: 4,184

Dawaka is a village in the Zam Department of Ganzourgou Province in central Burkina Faso.

Population
Year	Pop.	±%
1985	1,638	—
2006	2,430	+48.4%
2019	4,184	+72.2%
