= Gondré =

- Interactive map of Gondré
- Country: Burkina Faso
- Region: Plateau-Central Region
- Province: Ganzourgou
- Department: Boudry Department

Population (2019)
  - Total: 1,442

Gondré is a town in the Boudry Department of Ganzourgou Province in central Burkina Faso.

Population
Year	Pop.	±%
2006	2,188	—
2019	1,442	−34.1%
