= Tanama =

Coordinates: 11°57′N 0°46′W

- Interactive map of Tanama
- Country: Burkina Faso
- Region: Plateau-Central Region
- Province: Ganzourgou
- Department: Boudry Department

Population (2005 est.)
  - Total: 532

Tanama is a village in the Boudry Department of Ganzourgou Province in central Burkina Faso. The village has a population of 532.
