= Nadioutenga =

- Location in Burkina Faso
- Coordinates: 12°1′N 0°44′W
- Country: Burkina Faso
- Region: Plateau-Central Region
- Province: Ganzourgou
- Department: Boudry Department

Population (2019)
  - Total: 578

Nadioutenga is a village in the Boudry Department of Ganzourgou Province in central Burkina Faso.

Population
Year	Pop.	±%
1985	486	—
2006	419	−13.8%
2019	578	+37.9%
