= Kostenga, Boudry =

Kostenga Kostinga
- Location in Burkina Faso
- Coordinates: 12°8′N 0°44′W
- Country: Burkina Faso
- Region: Plateau-Central Region
- Province: Ganzourgou
- Department: Boudry Department

Population (2019)
  - Total: 713

Kostenga is a village in the Boudry Department of Ganzourgou Province in central Burkina Faso.

Population
| Year | Pop. | ±% |
|---|---|---|
| 1985 | 1,882 | — |
| 2006 | 541 | −71.3% |
| 2019 | 713 | +31.8% |
