= Darsalam, Ganzourgou =

Darsalam
- Country: Burkina Faso
- Region: Plateau-Central Region
- Province: Ganzourgou
- Department: Zoungou Department

Population (2019)
  - Total: 1,794

Darsalam is a village in the Zoungou Department of Ganzourgou Province in central Burkina Faso.

Population
Year	Pop.	±%
1985	747	—
2006	951	+27.3%
2019	1,794	+88.6%
