= Gouingo =

Gouingo Gouingho
- Location in Burkina Faso
- Coordinates: 12°14′N 0°50′W
- Country: Burkina Faso
- Region: Plateau-Central Region
- Province: Ganzourgou
- Department: Boudry Department

Population (2019)
  - Total: 1,122

Gouingo is a town in the Boudry Department of Ganzourgou Province in central Burkina Faso.

Population
Year	Pop.	±%
1985	1,309	—
2006	1,672	+27.7%
2019	1,122	−32.9%
