= Tameswéoghin =

Tameswéoghin Tamesweogo
- Interactive map of Tameswéoghin
- Country: Burkina Faso
- Region: Plateau-Central Region
- Province: Ganzourgou
- Department: Zoungou Department

Population (2019)
  - Total: 1,638

Tameswéoghin is a town in the Zoungou Department of Ganzourgou Province in central Burkina Faso.

Population
Year	Pop.	±%
1985	996	—
2006	1,172	+17.7%
2019	1,638	+39.8%
