= Koratinga =

- Location in Burkina Faso
- Coordinates: 12°29′N 0°57′W
- Country: Burkina Faso
- Region: Plateau-Central Region
- Province: Ganzourgou
- Department: Zam Department

Population (2019)
  - Total: 3,027

Koratinga is a village in the Zam Department of Ganzourgou Province in central Burkina Faso.

Population
Year	Pop.	±%
1985	1,421	—
2006	2,128	+49.8%
2019	3,027	+42.2%
