= Boulgou, Ganzourgou =

Boulgou
- Country: Burkina Faso
- Region: Plateau-Central Region
- Province: Ganzourgou
- Department: Zam Department

Population (2019)
  - Total: 1,013

Boulgou is a village in the Zam Department of Ganzourgou Province in central Burkina Faso.

Population
Year	Pop.	±%
1985	335	—
2006	813	+142.7%
2019	1,013	+24.6%
