= Nobsin =

Coordinates: 12°19′N 1°42′W

- Interactive map of Nobsin
- Country: Burkina Faso
- Region: Plateau-Central Region
- Province: Ganzourgou
- Department: Mogtédo Department

Population (2019)
  - Total: 2,989

Nobsin is a town in the Mogtédo Department of Ganzourgou Province in central Burkina Faso.

Population
| Year | Pop. | ±% |
|---|---|---|
| 1985 | 866 | — |
| 2006 | 2,306 | +166.3% |
| 2019 | 2,989 | +29.6% |
