= Rapadama peulh =

- Interactive map of Rapadama peulh
- Country: Burkina Faso
- Region: Plateau-Central Region
- Province: Ganzourgou
- Department: Zam Department

Population (2019)
  - Total: 372

Rapadama peulh is a village in the Zam Department of Ganzourgou Province in central Burkina Faso.

Population
Year	Pop.	±%
1985	103	—
2006	175	+69.9%
2019	372	+112.6%
