= Zantonré =

- Location within Burkina Faso
- Coordinates: 12.1289°N 0.4975°W
- Country: Burkina Faso
- Region: Plateau-Central Region
- Province: Ganzourgou
- Department: Zoungou Department

Population (2019)
  - Total: 1,395

Zantonré is a town in the Zoungou Department of Ganzourgou Province in central Burkina Faso.

Population
| Year | Pop. | ±% |
|---|---|---|
| 2006 | 1,078 | — |
| 2019 | 1,395 | +29.4% |
