= Kroumweogo =

Coordinates: 12°29′N 0°54′W

- Interactive map of Kroumweogo
- Country: Burkina Faso
- Region: Plateau-Central Region
- Province: Ganzourgou
- Department: Zam Department

Population (2019)
  - Total: 2,418

Kroumweogo is a village in the Zam Department of Ganzourgou Province in central Burkina Faso.

Population
Year	Pop.	±%
1985	918	—
2006	1,103	+20.2%
2019	2,418	+119.2%
