= Yorgho =

Yorgho Yargho
- Country: Burkina Faso
- Region: Plateau-Central Region
- Province: Ganzourgou
- Department: Zam Department

Population (2019)
  - Total: 2,692

Yorgho is a town in the Zam Department of Ganzourgou Province in central Burkina Faso.

Population
Year	Pop.	±%
1985	748	—
2006	1,730	+131.3%
2019	2,692	+55.6%
