= Badnogo =

Badnogo may refer to:

- Badnogo, Bazèga, Burkina Faso
- Badnogo, Ganzourgou, Burkina Faso
