= Gandeongo =

- Country: Burkina Faso
- Region: Plateau-Central Region
- Province: Ganzourgou
- Department: Zam Department

Population (2019)
  - Total: 2,418

Gandeongo is a village in the Zam Department of Ganzourgou Province in central Burkina Faso.

Population
Year	Pop.	±%
1985	946	—
2006	1,030	+8.9%
2019	2,418	+134.8%
