= Mankarga =

- Location in Burkina Faso
- Coordinates: 12°3′N 0°45′W
- Country: Burkina Faso
- Region: Plateau-Central Region
- Province: Ganzourgou
- Department: Boudry Department

Population (2005 est.)
  - Total: 1,204

Mankarga is a town in the Boudry Department of Ganzourgou Province in central Burkina Faso. The town has a population of 1204.
