= Rapadama T =

- Interactive map of Rapadama T
- Country: Burkina Faso
- Region: Plateau-Central Region
- Province: Ganzourgou
- Department: Zam Department

Population (2019)
  - Total: 2,572

Rapadama T is a village in the Zam Department of Ganzourgou Province in central Burkina Faso.

Population
Year	Pop.	±%
1985	1,086	—
2006	1,139	+4.9%
2019	2,572	+125.8%
