= Koratinga peulh =

- Country: Burkina Faso
- Region: Plateau-Central Region
- Province: Ganzourgou
- Department: Zam Department

Population (2019)
  - Total: 368

Koratinga peulh is a village in the Zam Department of Ganzourgou Province in central Burkina Faso.

Population
| Year | Pop. | ±% |
|---|---|---|
| 1985 | 300 | — |
| 2006 | 294 | −2.0% |
| 2019 | 368 | +25.2% |
