= Pittyn =

Pittyn Pittin
- Location in Burkina Faso
- Coordinates: 12°5′N 0°38′W
- Country: Burkina Faso
- Region: Plateau-Central Region
- Province: Ganzourgou
- Department: Boudry Department

Population (2019)
  - Total: 1,465

Pittyn (or Piti) is a town in the Boudry Department of Ganzourgou Province in central Burkina Faso.

Population
Year	Pop.	±%
1985	1,238	—
2006	1,584	+27.9%
2019	1,465	−7.5%
