= Tanlouka =

- Location in Burkina Faso
- Coordinates: 12°9′N 0°48′W
- Country: Burkina Faso
- Region: Plateau-Central Region
- Province: Ganzourgou
- Department: Boudry Department

Population (2019)
  - Total: 1,575

Tanlouka is a village in the Boudry Department of Ganzourgou Province in central Burkina Faso.

Population
Year	Pop.	±%
1985	1,862	—
2006	1,447	−22.3%
2019	1,575	+8.8%
