= Absouya Department =

Coordinates: 12.633°N 1.050°W

Absouya
- Department
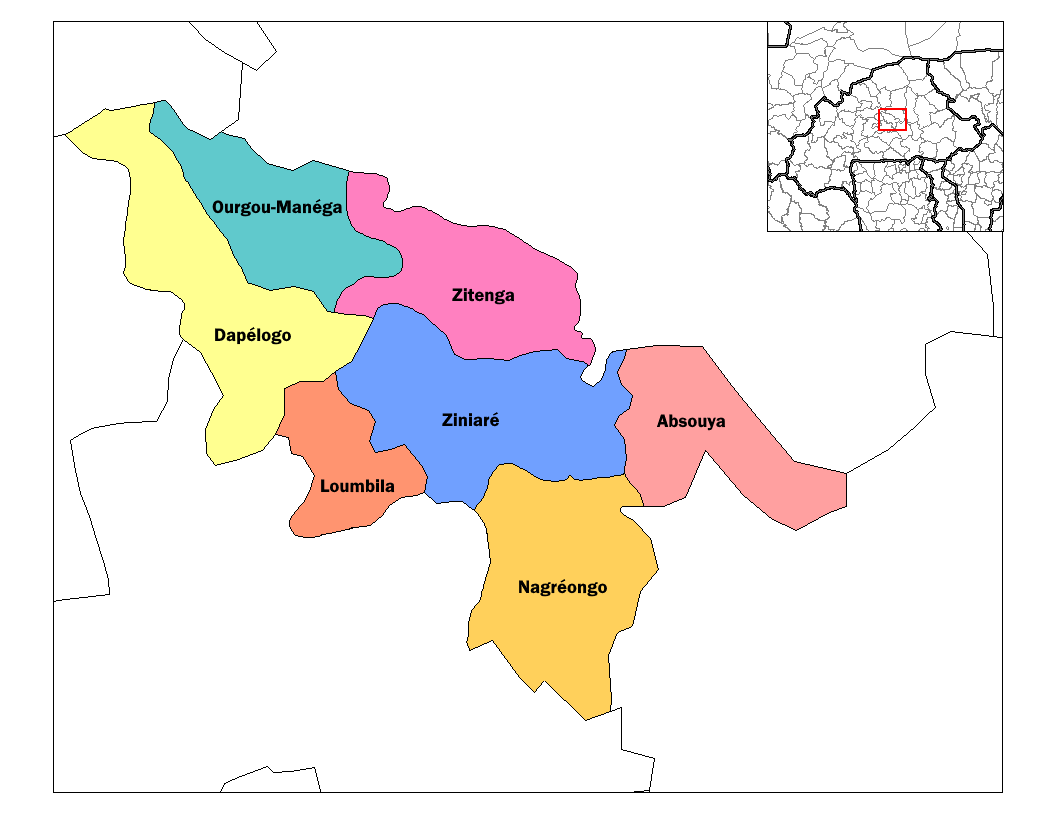
- Absouya Department location in the province
- Country: Burkina Faso
- Province: Oubritenga Province

Area
  - Total: 117.7 sq mi (304.9 km^{2})

Population (2019 census)
  - Total: 35,237
  - Density: 299.3/sq mi (115.6/km^{2})
- Time zone: UTC+0 (GMT 0)

Absouya is a department or commune of Oubritenga Province in western Burkina Faso. Its capital lies at the town of Oubritenga. According to the 1996 census the department has a total population of 26,188.

== Towns and villages ==
- Absouya (2 017 inhabitants) (capital)
- Bargo (2 021 inhabitants)
- Batenga (650 inhabitants)
- Bendogo (2 341 inhabitants)
- Bilogtenga (3 216 inhabitants)
- Danaogo (1 228 inhabitants)
- Gounghin (1 768 inhabitants)
- Largo (1 021 inhabitants)
- Moanéga (1 789 inhabitants)
- Mockin (2 580 inhabitants)
- Nabdoghin (1 281 inhabitants)
- Nioniogo (1 860 inhabitants)
- Sattin (968 inhabitants)
- Siguinvoussé (1 036 inhabitants)
- Siny (526 inhabitants)
- Tambizinsé (390 inhabitants)
- Tampaongo (1 496 inhabitants)
