= Gadghin =

- Interactive map of Gadghin
- Coordinates: 12°10′05″N 1°01′07″W
- Country: Burkina Faso
- Region: Plateau-Central Region
- Province: Ganzourgou
- Department: Mogtédo Department

Population (2019)
  - Total: 2,610

Gadghin is a village in the Mogtédo Department of Ganzourgou Province in central Burkina Faso.

Population
Year	Pop.	±%
2006	1,163	—
2019	2,610	+124.4%
