= Damongto =

Coordinates: 12°16′N 0°56′W

- Interactive map of Damongto
- Country: Burkina Faso
- Region: Plateau-Central Region
- Province: Ganzourgou
- Department: Zam Department

Population (2019)
  - Total: 1,354

Damongto is a village in the Zam Department of Ganzourgou Province in central Burkina Faso.

Population
Year	Pop.	±%
1985	760	—
2006	1,134	+49.2%
2019	1,354	+19.4%
