= Tandaga =

Tandaga may refer to:

- Tandaga, Bazèga, Burkina Faso
- Tandaga, Ganzourgou, Burkina Faso
