= Nabmalgma =

- Country: Burkina Faso
- Region: Plateau-Central Region
- Province: Ganzourgou
- Department: Zam Department

Population (2019)
  - Total: 609

Nabmalgma is a village in the Zam Department of Ganzourgou Province in central Burkina Faso.

Population
Year	Pop.	±%
2006	556	—
2019	609	+9.5%
