= Nahoutinga =

- Country: Burkina Faso
- Region: Plateau-Central Region
- Province: Ganzourgou
- Department: Zam Department

Population (2019)
  - Total: 1,772

Nahoutinga is a village in the Zam Department of Ganzourgou Province in central Burkina Faso.

Population
Year	Pop.	±%
1985	1,152	—
2006	1,180	+2.4%
2019	1,772	+50.2%
