= Kogho-Peulh =

- Country: Burkina Faso
- Region: Plateau-Central Region
- Province: Ganzourgou
- Department: Kogho Department

Population (2019)
  - Total: 77

Kogho-Peulh is a village in the Kogho Department of Ganzourgou Province in central Burkina Faso.

Population
Year	Pop.	±%
2006	84	—
2019	77	−8.3%
