= Foulgo =

Foulgo may refer to:

- Foulgo, Boudry, Burkina Faso
- Foulgo, Salogo, Burkina Faso
