= Komgnesse =

Town in central Burkina Faso

- Country: Burkina Faso
- Region: Plateau-Central Region
- Province: Ganzourgou
- Department: Zam Department

Population (2019)
  - Total: 1,419

Komgnesse is a village in the Zam Department of Ganzourgou Province in central Burkina Faso.

Population
Year	Pop.	±%
1985	626	—
2006	939	+50.0%
2019	1,419	+51.1%
