= Tamidou, Zoungou =

Tamidou
- Location within Burkina Faso
- Country: Burkina Faso
- Region: Plateau-Central Region
- Province: Ganzourgou
- Department: Zoungou Department

Population (2019)
  - Total: 665

Tamidou is a village in the Zoungou Department of Ganzourgou Province in central Burkina Faso.

Population
Year	Pop.	±%
2006	808	—
2019	665	−17.7%
