= Ouavoussé, Zoungou =

Village in central Burkina Faso

Ouavoussé
- Village
- Location in Burkina Faso
- Coordinates: 12°9′N 0°31′W
- Country: Burkina Faso
- Region: Plateau-Central Region
- Province: Ganzourgou
- Department: Zoungou Department

Population (2019)
  - Total: 1,801

Ouavoussé, Zoungou is a village in the Zoungou Department of Ganzourgou Province in central Burkina Faso.

Population
Year	Pop.	±%
1985	1,497	—
2006	1,258	−16.0%
2019	1,801	+43.2%
