= Lelkom =

- Location in Burkina Faso
- Coordinates: 12°12′N 0°41′W
- Country: Burkina Faso
- Region: Plateau-Central Region
- Province: Ganzourgou
- Department: Boudry Department

Population (2019)
  - Total: 1,936

Lelkom is a town in the Boudry Department of Ganzourgou Province in central Burkina Faso.

Population
Year	Pop.	±%
1985	954	—
2006	1,387	+45.4%
2019	1,936	+39.6%
