= Wemyaoghin =

- Location within Burkina Faso
- Coordinates: 12°6′46″N 0°31′26″W
- Country: Burkina Faso
- Region: Plateau-Central Region
- Province: Ganzourgou
- Department: Zoungou Department

Population (2019)
  - Total: 1,736

Wemyaoghin is a town in the Zoungou Department of Ganzourgou Province in central Burkina Faso.

Population
Year	Pop.	±%
2006	1,349	—
2019	1,736	+28.7%
