= Julien Kaboré =

His Excellency, The Most Reverend Julien Kaboré
- Apostolic Nuncio to Ghana; Titular Archbishop of Milevi
- Appointed: 29 June 2024
- Predecessor: Henryk Jagodziński
- Other post: Titular Archbishop of Milevi

Orders
- Ordination: 8 July 1995
- Consecration: 14 September 2024 by Pietro Parolin, Luis Antonio Tagle and Séraphin François Rouamba

Personal details
- Born: 18 June 1968 (age 58) Zorgho, Ganzourgou Province, Burkina Faso
- Motto: Spes non confundit
- Coat of arms

Styles of Julien Kaboré
- Reference style: His Excellency; The Most Reverend
- Spoken style: Your Excellency
- Religious style: Archbishop

Julien Kaboré (born 18 June 1968) is a Burkinabe prelate of the Catholic Church who has been appointed apostolic nuncio to Ghana. He has worked in the diplomatic service of the Holy See since 2004.

== Biography ==
Julien Kaboré was born on 18 June 1968 in Zorgho, Ganzourgou Province, Burkina Faso. He studied philosophy at St. John Baptist Major Seminary in Ouagadougou, Burkina Faso, from 1988 to 1990 and theology at St. Peter Claver Major Seminary in Bobo-Dioulasso, Burkina Faso, from 1990 to 1995. He was ordained a priest for the Roman Catholic Diocese of Koupéla on 8 July 1995.

From 1995 to 1995 he taught at St. Augustin Seminary in Baskouré. From 1998 to 2001, he studied dogmatic theology and canon law at Pontifical University in Rome.

He knows French, English, Italian, and Spanish.

== Diplomatic career ==
On 1 July 2004, he entered the diplomatic service of the Holy See. He worked in various capacities for the nunciatures to Kenya, Papua New Guinea and the Solomon Islands, Costa Rica, Korea and Mongolia, Croatia, Trinidad and Tobago, the Philippines and Ireland.

On 29 June 2024, Pope Francis appointed him Titular Archbishop of Milevi and Apostolic Nuncio to Ghana. He was consecrated as an archbishop on September 14, 2024.

== Publications ==
- Mieux vivre sa jeunesse (Ouagadougou: Éditions déscendues du Ciel, 2008)
- La Vertu (San José: Promesa, 2010)
- Catéchistes. Évangéliser les périphéries (Paris:Saint-Leger Éditions, 2017)

== See also ==
- List of heads of the diplomatic missions of the Holy See
