= Tankoala =

- Country: Burkina Faso
- Region: Plateau-Central Region
- Province: Ganzourgou
- Department: Boudry Department

Population (2005 est.)
  - Total: 74

Tankoala is a village in the Boudry Department of Ganzourgou Province in central Burkina Faso. The village has a population of 74.
