= Tollinghin =

Tollinghin Toliguin
- Interactive map of Tollinghin
- Country: Burkina Faso
- Region: Plateau-Central Region
- Province: Ganzourgou
- Department: Kogho Department

Population (2019)
  - Total: 2,214

Tollinghin or Tollingui is a town in the Kogho Department of Ganzourgou Province in central Burkina Faso.

Population
Year	Pop.	±%
1985	2,149	—
2006	1,694	−21.2%
2019	2,214	+30.7%
