= Gnégnéogo =

- Interactive map of Gnégnéogo
- Country: Burkina Faso
- Region: Plateau-Central Region
- Province: Ganzourgou
- Department: Salogo Department

Population (2019)
  - Total: 2,668

Gnégnéogo is a town in the Salogo Department of Ganzourgou Province in central Burkina Faso.

Population
Year	Pop.	±%
1985	1,144	—
2006	1,979	+73.0%
2019	2,668	+34.8%
