= Toéssin =

Toéssin may refer to:

- Toéssin, Mogtédo, Burkina Faso
- Toéssin, Zoungou, Burkina Faso
- Toéssin, Rollo, Burkina Faso
- Toéssin, Zimtenga, Burkina Faso
