= Pousghin =

Pousghin may refer to:

- Pousghin, Boudry, Burkina Faso
- Pousghin, Zam, Burkina Faso
