= Bissighin =

Village in central Burkina Faso

- Interactive map of Bissighin
- Country: Burkina Faso
- Region: Plateau-Central Region
- Province: Ganzourgou
- Department: Kogho Department

Population (2019)
  - Total: 1,697

Bissighin is a village in the Kogho Department of Ganzourgou Province in central Burkina Faso.

Population
Year	Pop.	±%
1985	2,006	—
2006	979	−51.2%
2019	1,697	+73.3%
