= Tanwaka =

- Location in Burkina Faso
- Coordinates: 12°9′N 0°45′W
- Country: Burkina Faso
- Region: Plateau-Central Region
- Province: Ganzourgou
- Department: Boudry Department

Population (2019)
  - Total: 1,844

Tanwaka is a town in the Boudry Department of Ganzourgou Province in central Burkina Faso.

== Geography ==
The terrain around Tanwaka is flat. The highest point in the area is 361 metres (1,150 ft) above sea level and is 2.3 km (1.4 mi) west of Tanwaka. The nearest larger town is Mogtédo, 17.7 km (11 mi) northwest of Tanwaka.

== Climate ==
The average temperature is 28 °C. The warmest month is April, at 33 °C, and the coolest is August, at 24 °C. The average annual rainfall is 1,055 millimeters (42 in). The wettest month is August, at 297 millimeters (11 in), and the driest is December, at 1 millimeter (0.4 in)

Population
Year	Pop.	±%
1985	1,926	—
2006	908	−52.9%
2019	1,844	+103.1%
