= Silmiougou =

Silmiougou may refer to:

- Silmiougou, Boudry, Burkina Faso
- Silmiougou, Boulgou, Burkina Faso
- Silmiougou, Zoungou, Burkina Faso
