= Tensobtenga =

Coordinates: 12°00′N 0°16′W

- Interactive map of Tensobtenga
- Country: Burkina Faso
- Region: Plateau-Central Region
- Province: Ganzourgou
- Department: Kogho Department

Population (2019)
  - Total: 2,122

Tensobtenga is a town in the Kogho Department of Ganzourgou Province in central Burkina Faso.

Population
Year	Pop.	±%
2006	1,359	—
2019	2,122	+56.1%
