= Parsigecko =

Scientific classification
- Domain: Eukaryota
- Kingdom: Animalia
- Phylum: Chordata
- Class: Reptilia
- Order: Squamata
- Infraorder: Gekkota
- Family: Gekkonidae
- Genus: Parsigecko; Safaei-Mahroo, Ghaffari, & Anderson, 2016
- Species: P. ziaiei

Binomial name
- Parsigecko ziaiei Safaei-Mahroo, Ghaffari, & Anderson, 2016

Genus of lizards

Parsigecko is a monotypic genus of lizards in the family Gekkonidae. It contains one species, Parsigecko ziaiei, known as Ziaie's Pars-gecko. It is found in southern Iran.

== Description ==
The adult, gravid female holotype had a snout-to-vent length of 39 mm (1.5 in) with a slender body 18 mm (0.71 in) across, and an elongated snout. The tail was broken but regenerated, longer than the body, with smooth dorsal caudal scales and two strongly keeled scales on the sides of each annulus. The precloacal area was covered with enlarged, elongated scales arranged in a single arch-shaped row, presumably carrying precloacal pores in males.

The iris of P. ziaiei is yellow and grey with the pupillary slit outlined in yellow. The top of the head is cream with many small, dark brown spots forming blotches. The sides of the head have a chocolate-brown stripe from below the eye stretching to the side, connecting at the back of the head. The body is flecked with brown, the top yellowish-cream in color with 7–8 irregular brown crossbars and the sides light pinkish tan without patterning. The limbs are also pinkish tan with irregular brown flecking and cream speckling. The tail is yellowish with 6 distinct, brown, semicircle bands with the spaces between broader than the banding. Regenerated tail parts are brown with cream blotches. The ventral surface of the gecko is light pink to white.

The genus Parsigecko is distinguished from other genera in Gekkonidae by a combination of the following: dorsal scales that are smooth, granular, subequal in size, not tuberculate and not imbricated, and two strongly keeled scales on the sides of each annulus of the tail. It is distinguished from other bent-toed geckos by its lack of dorsal tubercles, and from Microgecko species by its enlarged lateral caudal scales and single row of enlarged subcaudal scales.

== Taxonomy ==
The genus and species were first described in 2016 based on two gravid females collected in 2015. The type locality of Parsigecko ziaiei is from the Koh-e Homag Protected Area north of Zakin, Hormozgan Province in Iran, at an altitude of 1,596 m (5,236 ft).

The genus name derives from the word "Pars" which is an old name for Iran and seat of the Persian Empire which was centered in south-central Iran. The species was named in honor of Hooshang Ziaie, a lecturer and ecologist at Islamic Azad University, North Tehran branch and former head of three provincial offices of the Department of Environment (Iran), "in recognition of his remarkable and outstanding efforts toward wildlife conservation in Iran".

== Distribution and habitat ==
Parsigecko ziaiei is only known from the type locality, north of Zahin, Iran. It is a ground-dwelling gecko. The holotype and paratype were collected on steep hillsides in Zagros Mountains forest steppe and in Nubo-Sindian desert and semi-desert habitats. Associated plant species were Prunus scoparia (mountain almond shrubs), Pistacia atlantica (wild pistachio trees), Dodonaea viscosa (clammy hop seed bush), and Astragalus fasciculifolius (a milk vetch).

== Biology ==
Each gravid female contained a single large egg, 8–10 mm (0.31–0.39 in) in diameter. Oviposition was estimated as occurring in late spring.

P. ziaiei co-occurs with several other gecko species: Eublepharis angramainyu, Cyrtopodion kirmanense, Hemidactylus persicus, and Microgecko persicus.
