= Zomnogo =

- Country: Burkina Faso
- Region: Plateau-Central Region
- Province: Ganzourgou
- Department: Salogo Department

Population (2019)
  - Total: 2,876

Zomnogo is a town in the Salogo Department of Ganzourgou Province in central Burkina Faso.

Population
Year	Pop.	±%
1985	1,228	—
2006	2,006	+63.4%
2019	2,876	+43.4%
