= Tansèga =

Tansèga may refer to:

- Tansèga, Boudry, Burkina Faso
- Tansèga, Zoungou, Burkina Faso
