= Yaïka =

- Location in Burkina Faso
- Coordinates: 12°12′N 0°48′W
- Country: Burkina Faso
- Region: Plateau-Central Region
- Province: Ganzourgou
- Department: Boudry Department

Population (2019)
  - Total: 2,216

Yaïka is a town in the Boudry Department of Ganzourgou Province in central Burkina Faso.

Population
Year	Pop.	±%
1985	1,888	—
2006	638	−66.2%
2019	2,216	+247.3%
