= Ibogo, Ganzourgou =

Ibogo
- Interactive map of Ibogo
- Country: Burkina Faso
- Region: Plateau-Central Region
- Province: Ganzourgou
- Department: Boudry Department

Population (2019)
  - Total: 703

Ibogo is a village in the Boudry Department of Ganzourgou Province in central Burkina Faso.

Population
Year	Pop.	±%
1985	413	—
2006	403	−2.4%
2019	703	+74.4%
