= Filiba =

- Interactive map of Filiba
- Coordinates: 12°29′45″N 0°40′24″W
- Country: Burkina Faso
- Region: Plateau-Central Region
- Province: Ganzourgou
- Department: Salogo Department

Population (2019)
  - Total: 2,594

Filiba is a town in the Salogo Department of Ganzourgou Province in central Burkina Faso.

Population
Year	Pop.	±%
1985	1,306	—
2006	1,737	+33.0%
2019	2,594	+49.3%
