= Nobtenga =

Nobtenga Nombegtinga
- Country: Burkina Faso
- Region: Plateau-Central Region
- Province: Ganzourgou
- Department: Zoungou Department

Population (2019)
  - Total: 823

Nobtenga is a village in the Zoungou Department of Ganzourgou Province in central Burkina Faso.

Population
Year	Pop.	±%
1985	492	—
2006	697	+41.7%
2019	823	+18.1%
