= Talembika =

Talembika Tanlambika
- Country: Burkina Faso
- Region: Plateau-Central Region
- Province: Ganzourgou
- Department: Zam Department

Population (2019)
  - Total: 2,125

Talembika is a village in the Zam Department of Ganzourgou Province in central Burkina Faso.

Population
Year	Pop.	±%
1985	735	—
2006	1,645	+123.8%
2019	2,125	+29.2%
