= Zamsé, Ganzourgou =

Zamsé
- Location within Burkina Faso
- Coordinates: 12.5389°N 0.7261°W
- Country: Burkina Faso
- Region: Plateau-Central Region
- Province: Ganzourgou
- Department: Salogo Department

Population (2019)
  - Total: 1,901

Zamsé is a town in the Salogo Department of Ganzourgou Province in central Burkina Faso.

Population
Year	Pop.	±%
2006	1,081	—
2019	1,901	+75.9%
