= Boilghin =

- Interactive map of Boilghin
- Country: Burkina Faso
- Region: Plateau-Central Region
- Province: Ganzourgou
- Department: Salogo Department

Population (2019)
  - Total: 1,619

Boilghin is a town in the Salogo Department of Ganzourgou Province in central Burkina Faso.

Population
Year	Pop.	±%
1985	831	—
2006	1,098	+32.1%
2019	1,619	+47.4%
