= Limsèga =

Limsèga Limseiga
- Country: Burkina Faso
- Region: Plateau-Central Region
- Province: Ganzourgou
- Department: Boudry Department

Population (2019)
  - Total: 3,520

Limsèga is a town in the Boudry Department of Ganzourgou Province in central Burkina Faso.

Population
Year	Pop.	±%
1985	2,060	—
2006	1,743	−15.4%
2019	3,520	+102.0%
