= Lallé, Ganzourgou =

Lallé
- Location in Burkina Faso
- Coordinates: 12°26′N 0°52′W
- Country: Burkina Faso
- Region: Plateau-Central Region
- Province: Ganzourgou
- Department: Zam Department

Population (2019)
  - Total: 2,282

Lallé is a village in the Zam Department of Ganzourgou Province in central Burkina Faso.

Population
Year	Pop.	±%
1985	1,461	—
2006	1,373	−6.0%
2019	2,282	+66.2%
