= Nabmalguéma =

- Country: Burkina Faso
- Region: Plateau-Central Region
- Province: Ganzourgou
- Department: Boudry Department

Population (2019)
  - Total: 686

Nabmalguéma or Namalguema is a village in the Boudry Department of Ganzourgou Province in central Burkina Faso.

Population
Year	Pop.	±%
2006	632	—
2019	686	+8.5%
