= Gandaogo =

- Location in Burkina Faso
- Coordinates: 12°9′N 0°36′W
- Country: Burkina Faso
- Region: Plateau-Central Region
- Province: Ganzourgou
- Department: Zoungou Department

Population (2019)
  - Total: 1,651

Gandaogo is a town in the Zoungou Department of Ganzourgou Province in central Burkina Faso.

Population
Year	Pop.	±%
1985	2,767	—
2006	2,427	−12.3%
2019	1,651	−32.0%
