= Zoétgomdé, Ganzourgou =

Coordinates: 12°32′N 2°12′W

Zoétgomdé
- Interactive map of Zoétgomdé
- Country: Burkina Faso
- Region: Plateau-Central Region
- Province: Ganzourgou
- Department: Salogo Department

Population (2019)
  - Total: 248

Zoétgomdé is a village in the Salogo Department of Ganzourgou Province in central Burkina Faso.

Population
Year	Pop.	±%
2006	103	—
2019	248	+140.8%
