= Ipala, Ganzourgou =

Ipala
- Country: Burkina Faso
- Region: Plateau-Central Region
- Province: Ganzourgou
- Department: Zam Department

Population (2019)
  - Total: 970

Ipala is a village in the Zam Department of Ganzourgou Province in central Burkina Faso.

Population
Year	Pop.	±%
1985	643	—
2006	795	+23.6%
2019	970	+22.0%
