= Boudry-Peulh =

- Village
- Country: Burkina Faso
- Region: Plateau-Central Region
- Province: Ganzourgou
- Department: Boudry Department

Population (2019)
  - Total: 152

Boudry-Peulh is a village in the Boudry Department of Ganzourgou Province in central Burkina Faso.

Population
Year	Pop.	±%
1985	175	—
2006	112	−36.0%
2019	152	+35.7%
