= Bomboré =

- Country: Burkina Faso
- Region: Plateau-Central Region
- Province: Ganzourgou
- Department: Mogtédo Department

Population (2005 est.)
  - Total: 1,007

Bomboré is a town in the Mogtédo Department of Ganzourgou Province in central Burkina Faso. The town has a population of 1,007.
