= Nabasnonghin =

Nabasnonghin Nabasnogho
- Location in Burkina Faso
- Coordinates: 12°4′N 0°39′W
- Country: Burkina Faso
- Region: Plateau-Central Region
- Province: Ganzourgou
- Department: Boudry Department

Population (2019)
  - Total: 1,098

Nabasnonghin (or Nabasnoguen) is a village in the Boudry Department of Ganzourgou Province in central Burkina Faso.

Population
Year	Pop.	±%
1985	356	—
2006	819	+130.1%
2019	1,098	+34.1%
