= Bassemkoukouri =

- Village
- Location in Burkina Faso
- Coordinates: 12°38′N 0°38′W
- Country: Burkina Faso
- Region: Plateau-Central Region
- Province: Ganzourgou
- Department: Kogho Department

Population (2019)
  - Total: 1,190

Bassemkoukouri (or Bassomkoukouri) is a village in the Kogho Department of Ganzourgou Province in central Burkina Faso.

Population
Year	Pop.	±%
2006	740	—
2019	1,190	+60.8%
