= Zorbimba =

- Location within Burkina Faso
- Coordinates: 12.1317°N 0.44°W
- Country: Burkina Faso
- Region: Plateau-Central Region
- Province: Ganzourgou
- Department: Zoungou Department

Population (2019)
  - Total: 2,586

Zorbimba is a town in the Zoungou Department of Ganzourgou Province in central Burkina Faso.

Population
Year	Pop.	±%
2006	1,730	—
2019	2,586	+49.5%
