= Sambtenga =

Sambtenga Sambtinga
- Interactive map of Sambtenga
- Coordinates: 12°19′47″N 0°46′23″W
- Country: Burkina Faso
- Region: Plateau-Central Region
- Province: Ganzourgou
- Department: Salogo Department

Population (2019)
  - Total: 1,203

Sambtenga is a village in the Salogo Department of Ganzourgou Province in central Burkina Faso.

Population
Year	Pop.	±%
1985	978	—
2006	1,064	+8.8%
2019	1,203	+13.1%
