= Sambtinga =

Sambtinga Samtinga
- Country: Burkina Faso
- Region: Plateau-Central Region
- Province: Ganzourgou
- Department: Zam Department

Population (2019)
  - Total: 789

Sambtinga is a village in the Zam Department of Ganzourgou Province in central Burkina Faso.

Population
| Year | Pop. | ±% |
|---|---|---|
| 1985 | 256 | — |
| 2006 | 386 | +50.8% |
| 2019 | 789 | +104.4% |
