= Wayen Rapadama =

Wayen Rapadama Wayam Rapadama
- Country: Burkina Faso
- Region: Plateau-Central Region
- Province: Ganzourgou
- Department: Zam Department

Population (2019)
  - Total: 2,489

Wayen Rapadama is a town in the Zam Department of Ganzourgou Province in central Burkina Faso.

Population
Year	Pop.	±%
1985	806	—
2006	1,416	+75.7%
2019	2,489	+75.8%
