= Nédogo-Peulh =

- Country: Burkina Faso
- Region: Plateau-Central Region
- Province: Ganzourgou
- Department: Boudry Department

Population (2019)
  - Total: 210

Nédogo-Peulh is a village in the Boudry Department of Ganzourgou Province in central Burkina Faso.

Population
Year	Pop.	±%
1985	22	—
2006	154	+600.0%
2019	210	+36.4%
