= Toghin, Ganzourgou =

Toghin
- Location in Burkina Faso
- Country: Burkina Faso
- Region: Plateau-Central Region
- Province: Ganzourgou
- Department: Zam Department

Population (2019)
  - Total: 1,717

Toghin is a village in the Zam Department of Ganzourgou Province in central Burkina Faso.

Population
Year	Pop.	±%
1985	689	—
2006	1,001	+45.3%
2019	1,717	+71.5%
