= Ouayalgui =

- Location in Burkina Faso
- Coordinates: 12°1′N 0°43′W
- Country: Burkina Faso
- Region: Plateau-Central Region
- Province: Ganzourgou
- Department: Boudry Department

Population (2005 est.)
  - Total: 2,049

Ouayalgui is a town in the Boudry Department of Ganzourgou Province in central Burkina Faso. The town has a population of 2,049.
