= Yagma, Burkina Faso =

Yagma Yaguema
- Country: Burkina Faso
- Region: Plateau-Central Region
- Province: Ganzourgou
- Department: Zam Department

Population (2019)
  - Total: 1,193

Yagma, Burkina Faso is a village in the Zam Department of Ganzourgou Province in central Burkina Faso.

Population
Year	Pop.	±%
1985	220	—
2006	633	+187.7%
2019	1,193	+88.5%
