= Weotinga =

Weotinga Wetinga
- Location in Burkina Faso
- Coordinates: 12°22′N 0°56′W
- Country: Burkina Faso
- Region: Plateau-Central Region
- Province: Ganzourgou
- Department: Zam Department

Population (2019)
  - Total: 1,218

Weotinga (or Weotenga) is a town in the Zam Department of Ganzourgou Province in central Burkina Faso.

Population
Year	Pop.	±%
1985	395	—
2006	889	+125.1%
2019	1,218	+37.0%
