= Bourma, Ganzourgou =

Bourma
- Town
- Location within Burkina Faso
- Country: Burkina Faso
- Region: Plateau-Central Region
- Province: Ganzourgou
- Department: Boudry Department

Population (2019)
  - Total: 3,315

Bourma is a town in the Boudry Department of Ganzourgou Province in central Burkina Faso.

Population
Year	Pop.	±%
2006	3,410	—
2019	3,315	−2.8%
