= Yamganghin =

- Location in Burkina Faso
- Coordinates: 12°4′N 0°26′W
- Country: Burkina Faso
- Region: Plateau-Central Region
- Province: Ganzourgou
- Department: Zoungou Department

Population (2019)
  - Total: 1,662

Yamganghin is a town in the Zoungou Department of Ganzourgou Province in central Burkina Faso.

Population
Year	Pop.	±%
2006	1,085	—
2019	1,662	+53.2%
