= Bagzan =

- Village
- Country: Burkina Faso
- Region: Plateau-Central Region
- Province: Ganzourgou
- Department: Boudry Department

Population (2019)
  - Total: 860

Bagzan is a village in the Boudry Department of Ganzourgou Province in central Burkina Faso.

Population
| Year | Pop. | ±% |
|---|---|---|
| 2006 | 859 | — |
| 2019 | 860 | +0.1% |
