= Tansablogo =

Coordinates: 12°13′N 1°10′W

- Interactive map of Tansablogo
- Country: Burkina Faso
- Region: Plateau-Central Region
- Province: Ganzourgou
- Department: Salogo Department

Population (2019)
  - Total: 613

Tansablogo is a village in the Salogo Department of Ganzourgou Province in central Burkina Faso.

Population
Year	Pop.	±%
2006	403	—
2019	613	+52.1%
