= Dakaongo =

Dakaongo Dakanga
- Location in Burkina Faso
- Coordinates: 12°6′N 0°32′W
- Country: Burkina Faso
- Region: Plateau-Central Region
- Province: Ganzourgou
- Department: Zoungou Department

Population (2019)
  - Total: 1,614

Dakaongo is a town in the Zoungou Department of Ganzourgou Province in central Burkina Faso.

Population
Year	Pop.	±%
1985	470	—
2006	690	+46.8%
2019	1,614	+133.9%
