= Song-naaba =

Song-naaba Song-naba
- Country: Burkina Faso
- Region: Plateau-Central Region
- Province: Ganzourgou
- Department: Zam Department

Population (2019)
  - Total: 1,293

Song-naaba is a village in the Zam Department of Ganzourgou Province in central Burkina Faso.

Population
| Year | Pop. | ±% |
|---|---|---|
| 1985 | 519 | — |
| 2006 | 981 | +89.0% |
| 2019 | 1,293 | +31.8% |
