= Tallé =

Coordinates: 13°37′N 2°44′W

- Interactive map of Tallé
- Country: Burkina Faso
- Region: Plateau-Central Region
- Province: Ganzourgou
- Department: Boudry Department

Population (2019)
  - Total: 1,327

Tallé is a village in the Boudry Department of Ganzourgou Province in central Burkina Faso.

Population
Year	Pop.	±%
2006	1,002	—
2019	1,327	+32.4%
