= Rapadama =

- Location in Burkina Faso
- Coordinates: 12°18′N 0°56′W
- Country: Burkina Faso
- Region: Plateau-Central Region
- Province: Ganzourgou
- Department: Mogtédo Department

Population (2005 est.)
  - Total: 1,878

Rapadama is a town in the Mogtédo Department of Ganzourgou Province in central Burkina Faso. The town has a population of 1,878.
