= Goghin, Ganzourgou =

Goghin
- Interactive map of Goghin
- Coordinates: 12°09′27″N 0°27′29″W
- Country: Burkina Faso
- Region: Plateau-Central Region
- Province: Ganzourgou
- Department: Zoungou Department

Population (2019)
  - Total: 702

Goghin is a village in the Zoungou Department of Ganzourgou Province in central Burkina Faso.

Population
Year	Pop.	±%
1985	1,219	—
2006	343	−71.9%
2019	702	+104.7%
