= Tanlallé =

Village in central Burkina Faso

Coordinates: 13°22′N 1°41′W

- Interactive map of Tanlallé
- Country: Burkina Faso
- Region: Plateau-Central Region
- Province: Ganzourgou
- Department: Kogho Department

Population (2019)
  - Total: 1,086

Tanlallé is a village in the Kogho Department of Ganzourgou Province in central Burkina Faso.

Population
Year	Pop.	±%
2006	746	—
2019	1,086	+45.6%
