= Kougri =

Coordinates: 12°23′N 1°05′W

- Interactive map of Kougri
- Country: Burkina Faso
- Region: Plateau-Central Region
- Province: Ganzourgou
- Department: Zam Department

Population (2019)
  - Total: 7,703

Kougri is a village in the Zam Department of Ganzourgou Province in central Burkina Faso.

Population
Year	Pop.	±%
2006	5,122	—
2019	7,703	+50.4%
