= Kuilkanda =

- Interactive map of Kuilkanda
- Country: Burkina Faso
- Region: Plateau-Central Region
- Province: Ganzourgou
- Department: Zoungou Department

Population (2019)
  - Total: 1,931

Kuilkanda is a town in the Zoungou Department of Ganzourgou Province in central Burkina Faso.

Population
Year	Pop.	±%
2006	1,744	—
2019	1,931	+10.7%
