= Yamegtenga =

Yamegtenga Yamostinga
- Interactive map of Yamegtenga
- Country: Burkina Faso
- Region: Plateau-Central Region
- Province: Ganzourgou
- Department: Salogo Department

Population (2019)
  - Total: 1,212

Yamegtenga is a town in the Salogo Department of Ganzourgou Province in central Burkina Faso.

Population
Year	Pop.	±%
1985	896	—
2006	796	−11.2%
2019	1,212	+52.3%
