= Ronsin =

- Location in Burkina Faso
- Coordinates: 12°39′N 0°42′W
- Country: Burkina Faso
- Region: Plateau-Central Region
- Province: Ganzourgou
- Department: Kogho Department

Population (2019)
  - Total: 483

Ronsin (or: Ronsen) is a village in the Kogho Department of Ganzourgou Province in central Burkina Faso.

Population
Year	Pop.	±%
2006	402	—
2019	483	+20.1%
