= Pissi, Ganzourgou =

Pissi
- Location in Burkina Faso
- Coordinates: 12°20′N 0°57′W
- Country: Burkina Faso
- Region: Plateau-Central Region
- Province: Ganzourgou
- Department: Zam Department

Population (2019)
  - Total: 812

Pissi is a village in the Zam Department of Ganzourgou Province in central Burkina Faso.

Population
Year	Pop.	±%
1985	669	—
2006	819	+22.4%
2019	812	−0.9%
