= Koumséogo =

- Interactive map of Koumséogo
- Country: Burkina Faso
- Region: Plateau-Central Region
- Province: Ganzourgou
- Department: Salogo Department

Population (2019)
  - Total: 4,428

Koumséogo is a town in the Salogo Department of Ganzourgou Province in central Burkina Faso.

Population
Year	Pop.	±%
1985	1,624	—
2006	2,606	+60.5%
2019	4,428	+69.9%
