= Sankuissi =

Village in central Burkina Faso

Sankuissi Sankouinssin
- Country: Burkina Faso
- Region: Plateau-Central Region
- Province: Ganzourgou
- Department: Boudry Department

Population (2019)
  - Total: 2,823

Sankuissi is a town in the Boudry Department of Ganzourgou Province in central Burkina Faso.

Population
Year	Pop.	±%
1985	1,312	—
2006	1,961	+49.5%
2019	2,823	+44.0%
