= Foulgo, Salogo =

Foulgo
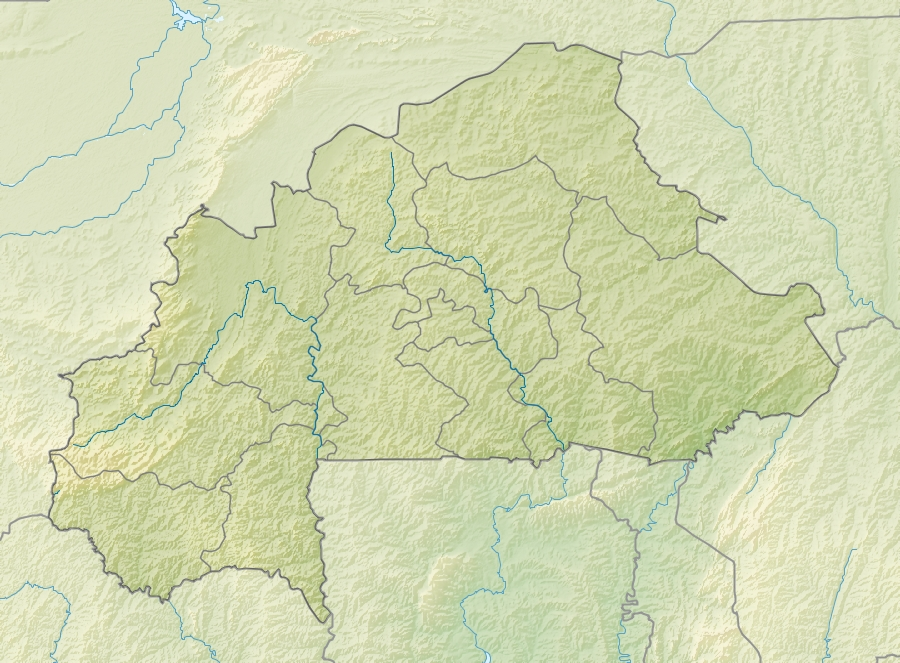
- Location within Burkina Faso Location within Africa
- Coordinates: 12°32′56″N 0°44′25″W
- Country: Burkina Faso
- Region: Plateau-Central Region
- Province: Ganzourgou
- Department: Salogo Department

Population (2019)
  - Total: 853

Foulgo is a village in the Salogo Department of Ganzourgou Province in central Burkina Faso.

Population
| Year | Pop. | ±% |
|---|---|---|
| 2006 | 879 | — |
| 2019 | 853 | −3.0% |
