= Kogho =

- Location in Burkina Faso
- Coordinates: 12°39′9″N 0°40′7″W
- Country: Burkina Faso
- Region: Plateau-Central Region
- Province: Ganzourgou
- Department: Kogho Department

Population (2019)
  - Total: 5,785

Kogho is the capital of the Kogho Department of Ganzourgou Province in central Burkina Faso.

Population
Year	Pop.	±%
1985	3,395	—
2006	3,896	+14.8%
2019	5,785	+48.5%
