= Tansèga, Zoungou =

Tansèga
- Location in Burkina Faso
- Coordinates: 12°7′N 0°31′W
- Country: Burkina Faso
- Region: Plateau-Central Region
- Province: Ganzourgou
- Department: Zoungou Department

Population (2019)
  - Total: 2,946

Tansèga is a town in the Zoungou Department of Ganzourgou Province in central Burkina Faso.

Population
Year	Pop.	±%
1985	925	—
2006	2,330	+151.9%
2019	2,946	+26.4%
