= Waada, Ganzourgou =

Waada
- Location in Burkina Faso
- Coordinates: 12°01′37″N 0°33′43″W
- Country: Burkina Faso
- Region: Plateau-Central Region
- Province: Ganzourgou
- Department: Zoungou Department

Population (2019)
  - Total: 3,989

Waada is a town in the Zoungou Department of Ganzourgou Province in central Burkina Faso.

Population
Year	Pop.	±%
2006	2,958	—
2019	3,989	+34.9%
