= Douré, Boudry =

Douré
- Location in Burkina Faso
- Coordinates: 12°13′N 0°43′W
- Country: Burkina Faso
- Region: Plateau-Central Region
- Province: Ganzourgou
- Department: Boudry Department

Population (2019)
  - Total: 465

Douré is a village in the Boudry Department of Ganzourgou Province in central Burkina Faso.

Population
Year	Pop.	±%
1985	436	—
2006	462	+6.0%
2019	465	+0.6%
