= Badnogo, Ganzourgou =

Badnogo
- Location in Burkina Faso
- Coordinates: 12°8′N 0°30′W
- Country: Burkina Faso
- Region: Plateau-Central Region
- Province: Ganzourgou
- Department: Zoungou Department

Population (2019)
  - Total: 433

Badnogo is a village in the Zoungou Department of Ganzourgou Province in central Burkina Faso.

Population
Year	Pop.	±%
1985	1,123	—
2006	355	−68.4%
2019	433	+22.0%
