= Silmiougou, Boudry =

Silmiougou
- Country: Burkina Faso
- Region: Plateau-Central Region
- Province: Ganzourgou
- Department: Boudry Department

Population (2019)
  - Total: 475

Silmiougou is a village in the Boudry Department of Ganzourgou Province in central Burkina Faso.

Population
Year	Pop.	±%
1985	57	—
2006	1,188	+1984.2%
2019	475	−60.0%
