= Salogo Department =

Coordinates: 12°26′37″N 0°37′00″W

Salogo
- Department
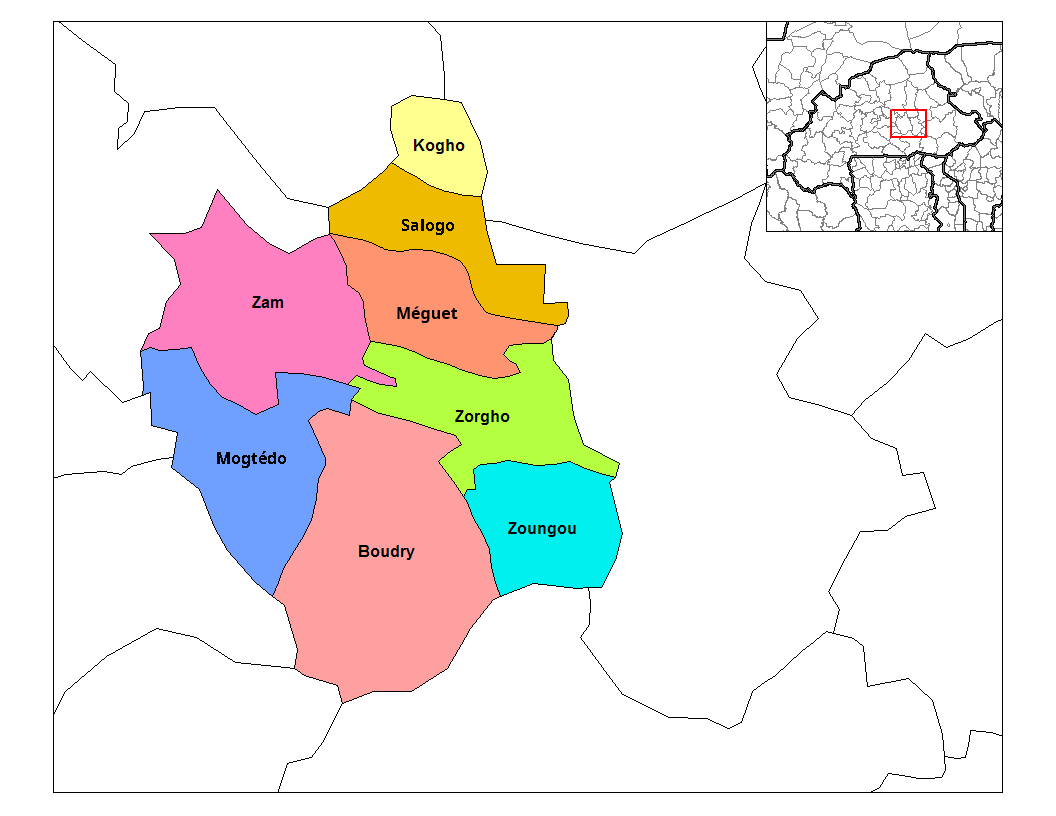
- Salogo Department's location in the province
- Country: Burkina Faso
- Region: Plateau-Central Region
- Province: Ganzourgou Province

Population (2006)
  - Total: 21,405
- Time zone: UTC+0 (GMT 0)

Salogo is a department or commune of Ganzourgou Province in central-eastern Burkina Faso. Its capital lies at the town of Salogo. According to the 2006 census, the department has a total population of 21,405.

== Towns and villages ==
- Salogo (3,368 inhabitants)
- Boilghin (1,101 inhabitants)
- Filiba (1,511 inhabitants)
- Foulgo (843 inhabitants)
- Gnégnéogo (1,864 inhabitants)
- Koumséogo (2,589 inhabitants)
- Nonghin (1,333 inhabitants)
- Sambtenga (903 inhabitants)
- Sankango (1,651 inhabitants)
- Tandaga (753 inhabitants)
- Tansablogo (800 inhabitants)
- Yamegtenga (1,410 inhabitants)
- Zamsé (1,258 inhabitants)
- Zoétgomdé (186 inhabitants)
- Zomnogo (2,111 inhabitants).
