= Salogo =

- Location in Burkina Faso
- Coordinates: 12°26′37″N 0°37′0″W
- Country: Burkina Faso
- Region: Plateau-Central Region
- Province: Ganzourgou
- Department: Salogo Department

Population (2019)
  - Total: 5,699

Salogo is the capital of Salogo Department of Ganzourgou Province in central Burkina Faso.

Population
Year	Pop.	±%
1985	2,749	—
2006	3,892	+41.6%
2019	5,699	+46.4%
