= Douré =

Douré may refer to several places in Burkina Faso:

- Douré, Bam
- Douré, Boudry
- Douré, Boulgou
- Douré, Boulkiemdé
- Douré, Doulougou
- Douré, Zorgho
