= Zoungou =

- Location in Burkina Faso
- Coordinates: 12°09′05″N 00°32′07″W
- Country: Burkina Faso
- Region: Plateau-Central Region
- Province: Ganzourgou
- Department: Zoungou Department

Population (2019)
  - Total: 2,943

Zoungou is the capital of the Zoungou Department of Ganzourgou Province in central Burkina Faso.

Population
Year	Pop.	±%
1985	966	—
2006	1,489	+54.1%
2019	2,943	+97.6%
