= Pousghin, Zam =

Pousghin
- Country: Burkina Faso
- Region: Plateau-Central Region
- Province: Ganzourgou
- Department: Zam Department

Population (2019)
  - Total: 1,475

Pousghin is a village in the Zam Department of Ganzourgou Province in central Burkina Faso.

Population
Year	Pop.	±%
1985	603	—
2006	1,068	+77.1%
2019	1,475	+38.1%
