= Pioneers of the Revolution =

Youth organization in Burkina Faso

Pioneers of the Revolution Pionniers de la Révolution
- Leader: Thomas Sankara
- Founded: 1983
- Dissolved: 1987
- Ideology: Marxism; Pan-Africanism
- Colours: Red (scarf) and yellow (beret)
- National affiliation: Committees for the Defense of the Revolution

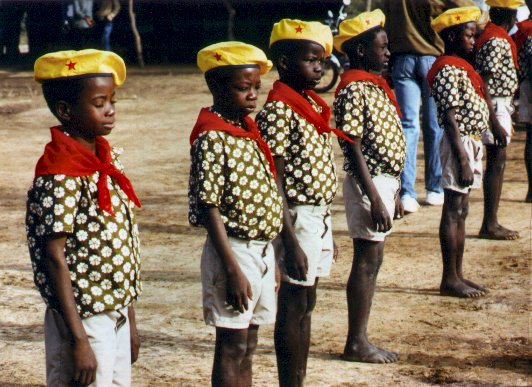
Pionniers de la Révolution in the town of Wayen-Zam, during a state visit by French President François Mitterrand, c. 1987

The Pioneers of the Revolution (French: Pionniers de la Révolution) was a youth organisation in Burkina Faso, modelled along the pattern of the pioneer movements typically operated by communist parties, such as the Vladimir Lenin All-Union Pioneer Organization and the Young Pioneers of China. The Pioneers of the Revolution organised children of all ages. Much like many other young pioneer movements, the most distinct sign of the Pioneers were their red scarves, combined with rudimentary uniforms and yellow berets.

The movement was founded by Captain Thomas Sankara, a Marxist and pan-Africanist revolutionary who came to power in what was then the Republic of Upper Volta after a popularly-supported coup in 1983. Sankara undertook what he called the "Democratic and Popular Revolution" (French: Révolution démocratique et populaire), a radical transformation of society. Many of the measures taken by Sankara and his Council of Popular Salvation junta were concerned with children – for example, female genital mutilation and forced marriages were banned, a nationwide literacy campaign was held, and approximately 2.5 million children were vaccinated against meningitis, yellow fever and measles.

Other entities created by Sankara's government included the Committees for the Defense of the Revolution, which many Pioneers belonged to as well, and the Popular Revolutionary Tribunals. Much like the Committees and the Tribunals, the Pioneers of the Revolution were abolished after Thomas Sankara was killed in 1987 by a military coup led by his former friend and colleague Blaise Compaoré, who would remain in power until his own overthrow in the 2014 Burkinabé uprising. One of the primary opposition groups against Compaoré's government was the Le Balai Citoyen. Its leader, the musician Sams’K Le Jah, stated in a 2014 interview that he received his political education as a teenager in Sankara's pioneer youth movement.

== See also ==
- 2014 Burkinabé uprising
- History of Burkina Faso
- Pioneer movement
