= Toyoko =

Village in Plateau-Central Region, Burkina Faso

- Location in Burkina Faso
- Coordinates: 12°15′N 0°55′W
- Country: Burkina Faso
- Region: Plateau-Central Region
- Province: Ganzourgou
- Department: Zam Department

Population (2019)
  - Total: 2,180

Toyoko is a village in the Zam Department of Ganzourgou Province in central Burkina Faso.

Population
Year	Pop.	±%
1985	736	—
2006	1,238	+68.2%
2019	2,180	+76.1%
