= Nonghin =

- Interactive map of Nonghin
- Country: Burkina Faso
- Region: Plateau-Central Region
- Province: Ganzourgou
- Department: Salogo Department

Population (2019)
  - Total: 2,084

Nonghin is a town in the Salogo Department of Ganzourgou Province in central Burkina Faso.

Population
Year	Pop.	±%
1985	1,152	—
2006	1,462	+26.9%
2019	2,084	+42.5%
