= Silmiougou, Zoungou =

Silmiougou
- Location in Burkina Faso
- Coordinates: 12°9′N 0°33′W
- Country: Burkina Faso
- Region: Plateau-Central Region
- Province: Ganzourgou
- Department: Zoungou Department

Population (2019)
  - Total: 1,628

Silmiougou is a village in the Zoungou Department of Ganzourgou Province in central Burkina Faso.

Population
Year	Pop.	±%
1985	645	—
2006	1,066	+65.3%
2019	1,628	+52.7%
