= Waada =

Waada may refer to:

- Waada, Ganzourgou, a town in the Zoungou Department, Ganzourgou Province, Burkina Faso
- Waada (TV series), a Pakistani drama television series
- Waada (film), a 1957 Pakistani musical romance film
