= Tansèga, Boudry =

Tansèga
- Location in Burkina Faso
- Coordinates: 12°11′N 0°45′W
- Country: Burkina Faso
- Region: Plateau-Central Region
- Province: Ganzourgou
- Department: Boudry Department

Population (2019)
  - Total: 722

Tansèga is a village in the Boudry Department of Ganzourgou Province in central Burkina Faso.

Population
Year	Pop.	±%
2006	454	—
2019	722	+59.0%
