= Blaise Yaméogo =

Burkinabé footballer

Personal information
- Full name: Franck Alex Neeb-Noma; Blaise Yaméogo
- Date of birth: 28 December 1993 (age 32)
- Place of birth: Boudry, Burkina Faso
- Height: 1.81 m (5 ft 11 in)
- Position: Forward

Youth career
- RC Kadiogo

Senior career*
Years	Team	Apps	(Gls)
2013–2016	RC Kadiogo		
2016–2018	EF Ouagadougou		
2018	Zimbru Chișinău	18	(3)
2019–2021	Chindia Târgoviște	53	(2)
2021–2022	1599 Șelimbăr	16	(1)
2023	Gloria Bistrița	12	(3)
2024	CSM Alexandria	4	(0)

International career
2017	Burkina Faso	1	(0)
- * Club domestic league appearances and goals as of 11 May 2024

Franck Alex Neeb-Noma Blaise Yaméogo, commonly known as Blaise Yaméogo, (born 28 December 1993) is a Burkinabé professional footballer who plays as a forward.

== Club career ==
Yaméogo started his career in Burkina Faso at Rail Club du Kadiogo, then playing for EF Ouagadougou, before signing a contract in Europe, with Moldovan side Zimbru Chișinău. During the competitive break in the winter of the 2022–2023 season, he signed with CS Gloria Bistrița-Năsăud.

== International career ==
Blaise Yaméogo made his debut for Burkina Faso on 12 August 2017 in a draw against Ghana.

== Honours ==
RC Kadiogo

- Burkinabé Premier League: 2015–16
- Coupe du Faso: 2015–16

EF Ouagadougou

- Coupe du Faso: 2016–17

Zimbru Chișinău

- Moldovan Cup runner-up: 2017–18
