= Toéssin, Mogtédo =

Toéssin
- Location in Burkina Faso
- Coordinates: 12°17′N 0°53′W
- Country: Burkina Faso
- Region: Plateau-Central Region
- Province: Ganzourgou
- Department: Mogtédo Department

Population (2019)
  - Total: 2,111

Toéssin (or Toèssen) is a town in the Mogtédo Department of Ganzourgou Province in central Burkina Faso.

Population
Year	Pop.	±%
1985	744	—
2006	1,168	+57.0%
2019	2,111	+80.7%
