= Zam, Burkina Faso =

Zam
- Location in Burkina Faso
- Coordinates: 12°20′32″N 0°49′56″W
- Country: Burkina Faso
- Region: Plateau-Central Region
- Province: Ganzourgou
- Department: Zam Department

Population (2019)
  - Total: 3,462

Zam is the capital of the Zam Department of Ganzourgou Province in central Burkina Faso.

Population
Year	Pop.	±%
1985	1,275	—
2006	2,667	+109.2%
2019	3,462	+29.8%
