= Toyoko (disambiguation) =

Toyoko may refer to:

- Toyoko, a village in Burkina Faso
- Tōyoko (東横), an abbreviation of "Tokyo and Yokohama"
- Tōkyū Tōyoko Line, a train line operated by Tōkyū which connects the two cities
- Toyoko Inn, a business hotel chain in Japan.
- Toyoko kids, homeless youth beside the Shinjuku Toho Building in Kabuki-chō

== People ==
- Toyoko Iwahara (born 1945), Japanese Olympic volleyball player
- Toyoko Kimura (木村 トヨ子, born 1946), Japanese swimmer
- Toyoko Tokiwa (1928–2019), Japanese photographer
- Toyoko Yamasaki (1924–2013), Japanese author
- Toyoko Nakazato (中里 豊子), Japanese opera singer
- Toyoko Oku (大木 豊子, born 1966), Japanese archer
- Toyoko Yoshino (吉野 トヨ子, 1920 - 2015), Japanese discus thrower
- Toyoko Takami (born 1945), Japanese composer and music educator
