= Tandaga, Ganzourgou =

Tandaga
- Location in Burkina Faso
- Country: Burkina Faso
- Region: Plateau-Central Region
- Province: Ganzourgou
- Department: Salogo Department

Population (2019)
  - Total: 947

Tandaga is a village in the Salogo Department of Ganzourgou Province in central Burkina Faso.

Population
Year	Pop.	±%
2006	688	—
2019	947	+37.6%
