= Mogtédo =

- Location within Burkina Faso
- Coordinates: 12°17′N 0°50′W
- Country: Burkina Faso
- Region: Plateau-Central Region
- Province: Ganzourgou
- Department: Mogtédo Department

Population (2019 census)
  - Total: 25,699
- Time zone: UTC+0 (GMT)

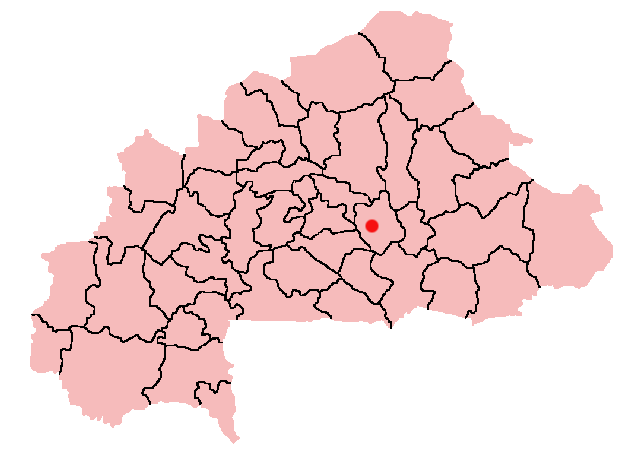
Location of Mogtedo in Burkina Faso

Mogtédo, also spelt Mogtedo or Moktedo, is a town located in the province of Ganzourgou in Burkina Faso. The population of Mogtédo is 25,699, and it is the capital of Mogtédo Department.
