= Foulgo, Boudry =

Foulgo
- Location in Burkina Faso
- Coordinates: 12°10′N 0°44′W
- Country: Burkina Faso
- Region: Plateau-Central Region
- Province: Ganzourgou
- Department: Boudry Department

Population (2019)
  - Total: 651

Foulgo is a village in the Boudry Department of Ganzourgou Province in central Burkina Faso.

Population
Year	Pop.	±%
1985	372	—
2006	419	+12.6%
2019	651	+55.4%
