= Toéssin, Zoungou =

Toéssin
- Country: Burkina Faso
- Region: Plateau-Central Region
- Province: Ganzourgou
- Department: Zoungou Department

Population (2019)
  - Total: 1,039

Toéssin is a village in the Zoungou Department of Ganzourgou Province in central Burkina Faso.

Population
Year	Pop.	±%
2006	706	—
2019	1,039	+47.2%
