= Wayen-Zam =

Wayen-Zam Wayam Zam
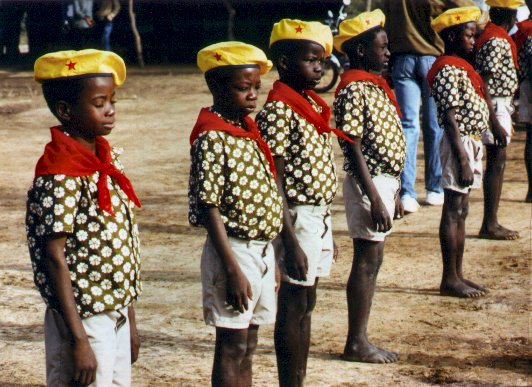
- Pionniers de la révolution in Wayen

- Location in Burkina Faso
- Coordinates: 12°20′33″N 1°0′5″W
- Country: Burkina Faso
- Region: Plateau-Central Region
- Province: Ganzourgou
- Department: Zam Department

Population (2019)
  - Total: 912

Wayen-Zam is a town in the Zam Department of Ganzourgou Province in central Burkina Faso.

Population
Year	Pop.	±%
1985	648	—
2006	382	−41.0%
2019	912	+138.7%
