= Songdin =

Songdin may refer to:

- Songdin, Boudry, Burkina Faso
- Songdin, Zorgho, Burkina Faso
