= Pousghin, Boudry =

Pousghin
- Location in Burkina Faso
- Coordinates: 12°6′N 0°44′W
- Country: Burkina Faso
- Region: Plateau-Central Region
- Province: Ganzourgou
- Department: Boudry Department

Population (2019)
  - Total: 1,980

Pousghin is a town in the Boudry Department of Ganzourgou Province in central Burkina Faso.

Population
| Year | Pop. | ±% |
|---|---|---|
| 1985 | 1,466 | — |
| 2006 | 1,602 | +9.3% |
| 2019 | 1,980 | +23.6% |
