= Andem =

Andem may refer to:

- Andem, Gabon
- A surname of Telugu speaking people of Reddy community living mostly in the Telangana and Andhra Pradesh states of India.

== People with the surname ==
- Julie Andem (born 1982), Norwegian screenwriter, director, and television producer
- Bassey William Andem (born 1968), Cameroonian footballer
