= Sams'K Le Jah =

Karim Sama (born 1971), more commonly known by his stage name Sams'K Le Jah, is a reggae musician, radio host and political activist from Burkina Faso. He was born in the neighbouring Ivory Coast, before coming to Burkina Faso in 1985. During his teens he was a member of the Pioneers of the Revolution, a youth movement created by Captain Thomas Sankara, a radical left-wing revolutionary who came to power in 1983 military coup. A member of the Rastafari movement as well as a Sankarist, he upholds both Sankara and Haile Selassie.

He hosts a music programme on Radio Omega FM, where he frequently airs his outspoken views. In 2007, after playing at a concert calling for freedom of the press in Burkina Faso and justice for the murdered journalist Norbert Zongo, his car was torched outside of the radio station and he received several death threats.

Sams’K Le Jah co-founded Le Balai Citoyen ("The Citizen's Broom"), a grassroots political movement, together with the hip hop musician Serge Bambara in 2013. The movement is opposed to political corruption and the government of President Blaise Compaoré, who ousted and killed Thomas Sankara in a 1987 coup. He became a prominent opposition leader during the 2014 Burkinabé uprising, which on 31 October 2014 forced Compaoré to resign and flee the country. Writing on Twitter, the reggae musician called for his countrymen to be cautious towards military, which took control following Compaoré's resignation.

== See also ==
- Music of Burkina Faso
