= Ziniaré =

- Location within Burkina Faso, West Africa
- Coordinates: 12°35′00″N 01°18′00″W
- Country: Burkina Faso

Population (2019 census)
  - Total: 33,296
- Time zone: UTC+0 (GMT)
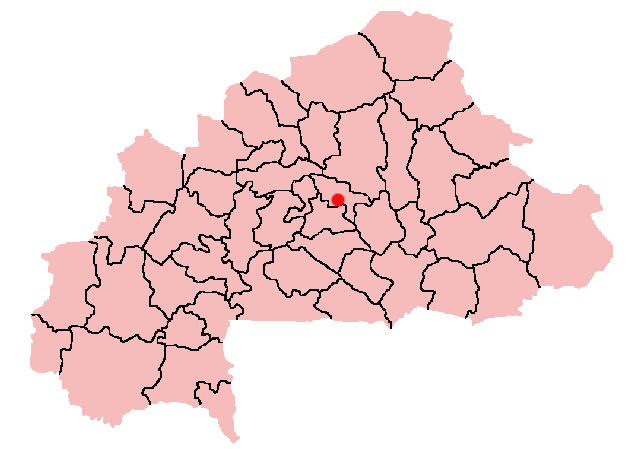
- Location of Ziniaré in Burkina Faso

Ziniaré is a town located in the province of Oubritenga in Burkina Faso. It is the capital of Oubritenga Province and Plateau-Central Region.

== Geography ==
Ziniaré is located 35 km northeast of downtown Ouagadougou.

In 2006, the city had 18,619 inhabitants, divided into five sectors:

- Sector 1 (3,027 inhabitants)
- Sector 2 (6,834 inhabitants)
- Sector 3 (2,656 inhabitants)
- Sector 4 (3,094 inhabitants)
- Sector 5 (3,008 inhabitants)

The city is crossed by national road 3 which connects Ouagadougou to the northeast of the country.

== Health and education ==
Ziniaré is home to the province's medical center with surgical antenna (CMA) as well as a health and social promotion center (CSPS).
