= Dapélogo Department =

Coordinates: 12°40′09″N 1°32′04″W

Dapelogo
- Department
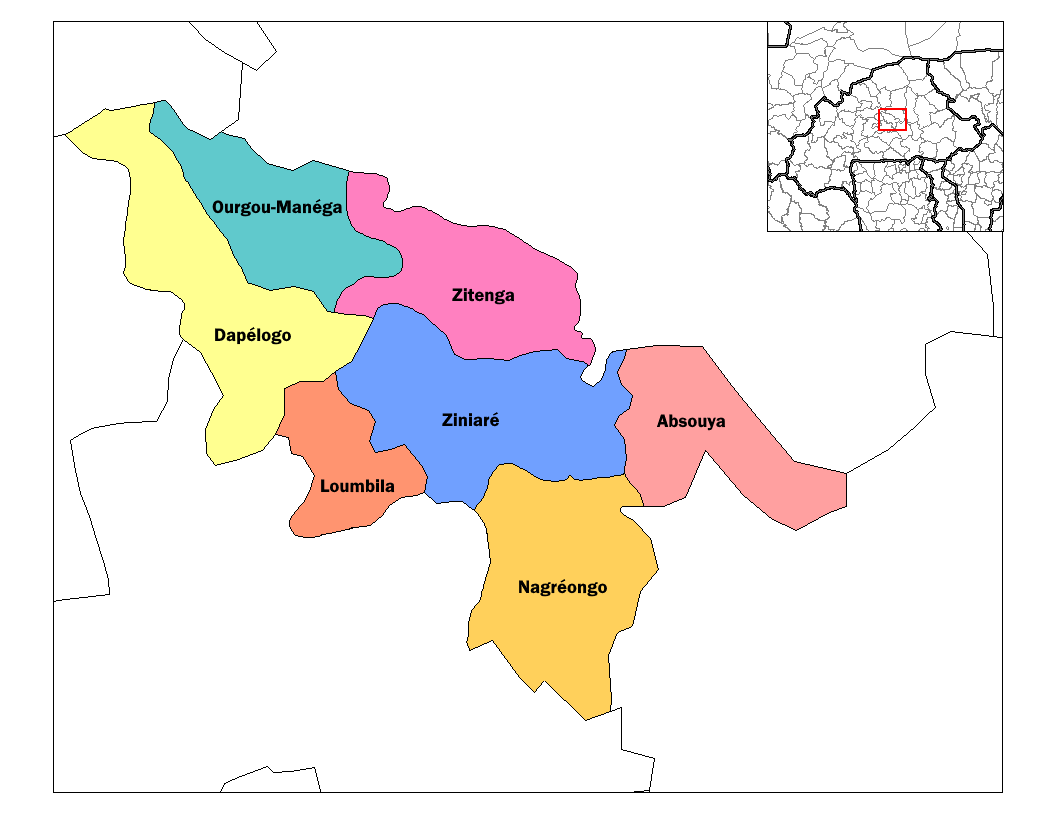
- Dapelogo Department location in the province
- Country: Burkina Faso
- Province: Oubritenga Province

Area
  - Total: 168.6 sq mi (436.6 km^{2})

Population (2019)
  - Total: 44,948
  - Density: 266.6/sq mi (103.0/km^{2})
- Time zone: UTC+0 (GMT 0)

Dapelogo is a department or commune of Oubritenga Province in northern-central Burkina Faso. Its capital lies at the town of Dapelogo. According to the 2019 census the department has a total population of 36,356.

== Towns and villages ==
- Dapelogo (6 585 inhabitants) (capital)
- Cissé-yarcé (791 inhabitants)
- Dié (2 638 inhabitants)
- Gademtenga (3 661 inhabitants)
- Garpéné (952 inhabitants)
- Kouila (634 inhabitants)
- Manessa (4 595 inhabitants)
- Nabi-yiri (192 inhabitants)
- Napalgué (285 inhabitants)
- Nayambsé (780 inhabitants)
- Niandeghin (350 inhabitants)
- Nioniogo (2 037 inhabitants)
- Ouamzong-Yiri (117 inhabitants)
- Pagatenga (774 inhabitants)
- Pighin (1 326 inhabitants)
- Poédogo (475 inhabitants)
- Soglozi (1 651 inhabitants)
- Somnawaye (770 inhabitants)
- Souka (684 inhabitants)
- Tamporain (527 inhabitants)
- Tanghin Niangeghin (544 inhabitants)
- Tanguiga (1 561 inhabitants)
- Tigem Koamba (703 inhabitants)
- Voaga (3 386 inhabitants)
- Youm-yiri (338 inhabitants)
