= Mogtédo Department =

Coordinates: 12°17′04″N 0°50′14″W

Mogtédo
- Department
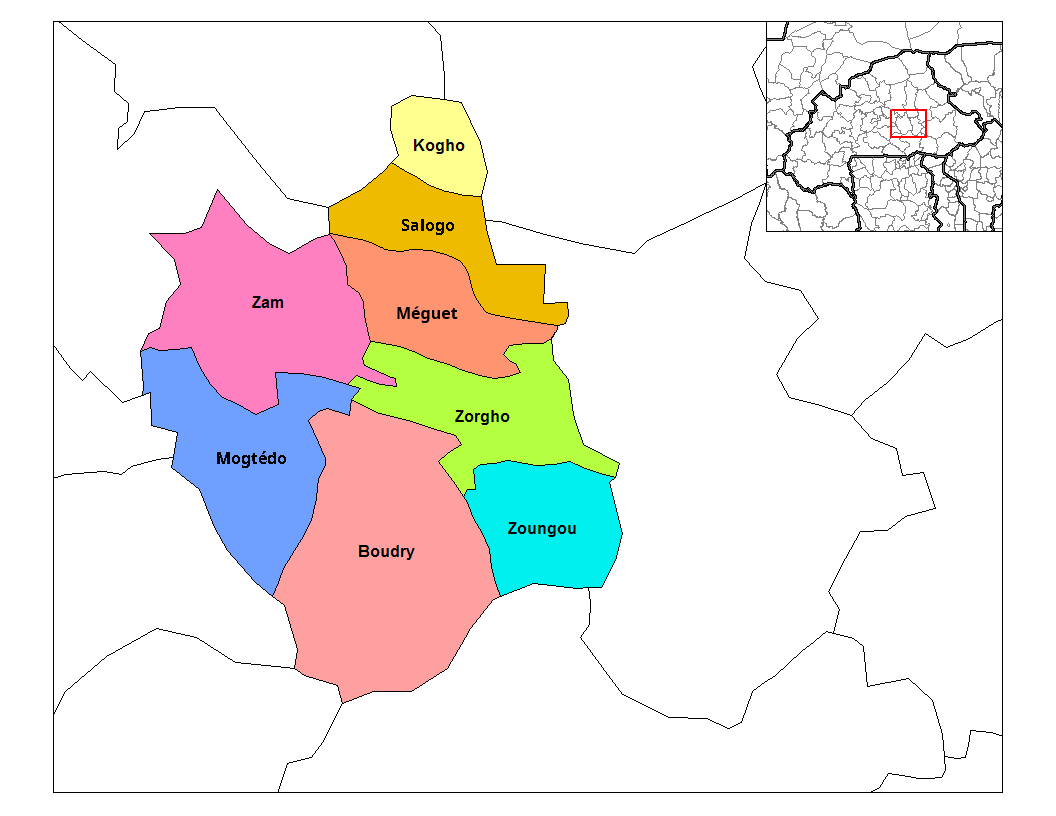
- Mogtédo Department location in the province
- Country: Burkina Faso
- Province: Ganzourgou Province

Government
  - Type: Mogtedo has a king who take care of the tradition and make sure that certain moral values don't change with the time. It also has a mayor whose name is Mr. Tibo Joseph Guigma. The mayor take care of the social duties such as birth, lands, weddings, and commerce certificates. He is the one who ensure that the whole department respect the bylaws and signs all the legal documents.
  - Mayor,: Tibo Joseph Guigma. King, Sa Majesty Naba Koabga de Mogtedo.

Population (2012)
  - Total: 44,668
- Time zone: UTC+0 (GMT 0)

Mogtédo is a department or commune of Ganzourgou Province in central-eastern Burkina Faso. Its capital lies at the town of Mogtédo. According to the 2006 general population census, actualized in 2012 for the municipal elections, the department has a total population of 44,668.

== Towns and villages ==
- Mogtédo (15 076 inhabitants) (capital)
- Bomboré (8 657 inhabitants)
- Gadghin (301 inhabitants)
- Nobsin (1 998 inhabitants)
- Rapadama (12 647 inhabitants)
- Toéssin (1 498 inhabitants)
