= Bendogo =

- Town
- Location in Burkina Faso
- Coordinates: 12°39′N 0°45′W
- Country: Burkina Faso
- Region: Plateau-Central Region
- Province: Ganzourgou
- Department: Kogho Department

Population (2019)
  - Total: 1,483

Bendogo (or Bindogo) is a town in the Kogho Department of Ganzourgou Province in central Burkina Faso.

Population
Year	Pop.	±%
1985	1,099	—
2006	1,105	+0.5%
2019	1,483	+34.2%
