= Zam Department =

Coordinates: 12°20′32″N 0°49′56″W

Zam
- Department
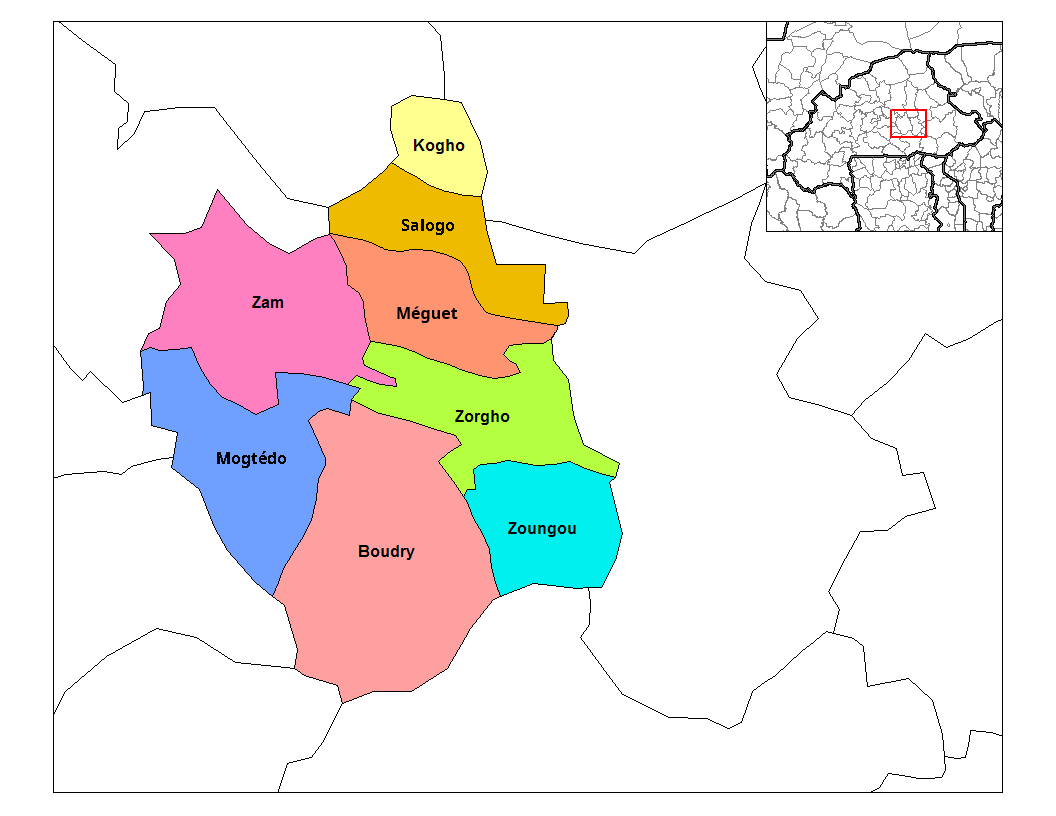
- Zam Department location in the province
- Country: Burkina Faso
- Province: Ganzourgou Province

Population (1996)
  - Total: 39,259
- Time zone: UTC+0 (GMT 0)

Zam is a department or commune of Ganzourgou Province in central-eastern Burkina Faso. Its capital lies at the town of Zam. According to the 1996 census, the department has a total population of 39,259.

== Towns and villages ==
- Zam (1,574 inhabitants) (capital)
- Boulgou (483 inhabitants)
- Damigoghin (911 inhabitants)
- Damongto (1,087 inhabitants)
- Dassimpouigo (1,071 inhabitants)
- Dawaka (2,443 inhabitants)
- Gandeongo (1,447 inhabitants)
- Amdalaye (296 inhabitants)
- Ipala (824 inhabitants)
- Komgnesse (908 inhabitants)
- Kieglesse (520 inhabitants)
- Koratinga (1,951 inhabitants)
- Koratinga peulh (271 inhabitants)
- Kougri (4,110 inhabitants)
- Kroumweogo (1,320 inhabitants)
- Lallé (1,481 inhabitants)
- Nabmalgma (708 inhabitants)
- Nangbangdré (786 inhabitants)
- Nahoutinga (1,782 inhabitants)
- Pissi (544 inhabitants)
- Pousghin (949 inhabitants)
- Rapadama peulh (411 inhabitants)
- Rapadama T (1,545 inhabitants)
- Sambtinga (405 inhabitants)
- Song-naaba (949 inhabitants)
- Talembika (1,429 inhabitants)
- Toghin (1,019 inhabitants)
- Toyoko (1,334 inhabitants)
- Waltinga (764 inhabitants)
- Wayen-Zam (1,285 inhabitants)
- Wayen Rapadama (1,366 inhabitants)
- Weotinga (1,078 inhabitants)
- Yagma (609 inhabitants)
- Yarghin (491 inhabitants)
- Yorgho (1,108 inhabitants)
