= Zoungou Department =

Zoungou
- Department
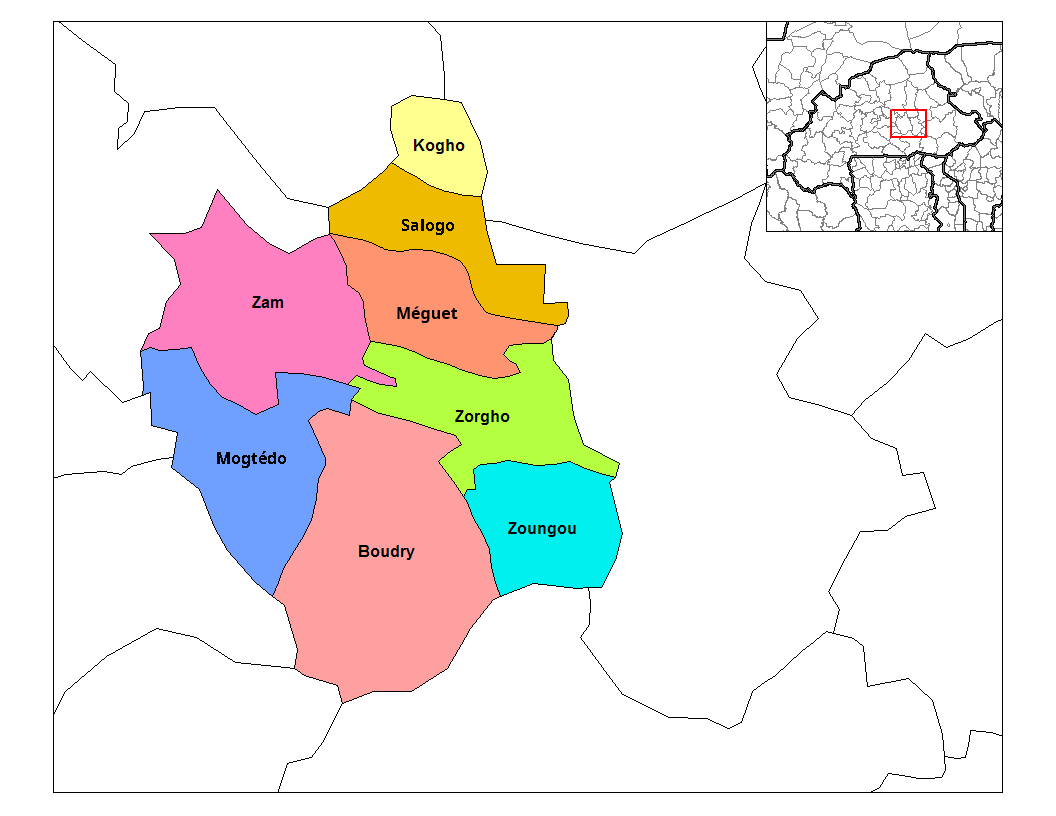
- Zoungou Department's location in the province
- Coordinates: 12°09′05″N 00°32′07″W
- Country: Burkina Faso
- Province: Ganzourgou Province

Population (1996)
  - Total: 29,753
- Time zone: UTC+0 (GMT 0)

Zoungou is a department or commune of Ganzourgou Province in central-eastern Burkina Faso. Its capital lies at the town of Zoungou. According to the 1996 census the department has a total population of 29,753.

== Towns and villages ==
- Zoungou (1 426 inhabitants) (capital)
- Badnogo (286 inhabitants)
- Bitoungou (473 inhabitants)
- Dakaongo (1 245 inhabitants)
- Darsalam (858 inhabitants)
- Gandaogo (2 277 inhabitants)
- Goghin (320 inhabitants)
- Kuilkanda (1 136 inhabitants)
- Kuilmasga (979 inhabitants)
- Nobtenga (707 inhabitants)
- Ouavoussé (1 454 inhabitants)
- Paspanga (1 297 inhabitants)
- Ramatoulaye (619 inhabitants)
- Silmiougou (1 016 inhabitants)
- Tanghin (1 274 inhabitants)
- Tansèga (2 273 inhabitants)
- Tameswéoghin (1 201 inhabitants)
- Tamidou (343 inhabitants)
- Taonsghin (1 045 inhabitants)
- Toéssin (689 inhabitants)
- Waada (2 522 inhabitants)
- Wemyaoghin (1 249 inhabitants)
- Yamganghin (1 034 inhabitants)
- Zantonré (1 050 inhabitants)
- Zorbimba (1 779 inhabitants)
