= Kogho Department =

Coordinates: 12°39′09″N 0°40′07″W

Kogho
- Department
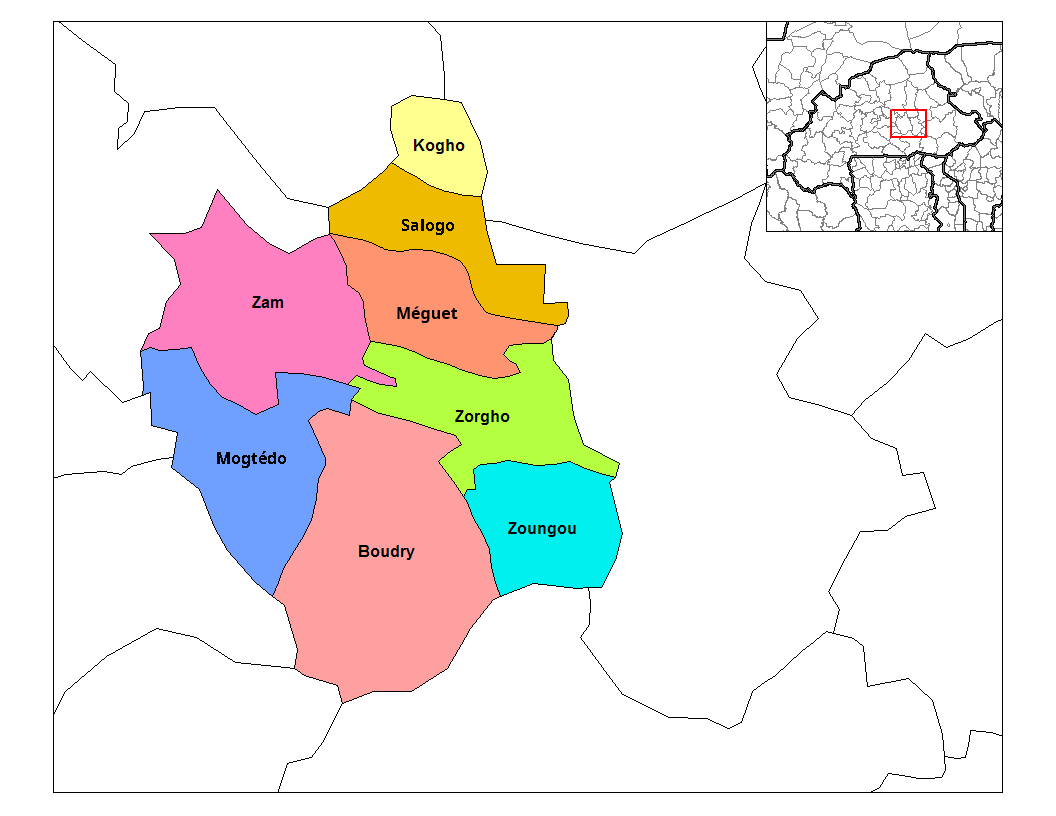
- Kogho Department location in the province
- Country: Burkina Faso
- Province: Ganzourgou Province

Population (1996)
  - Total: 15,524
- Time zone: UTC+0 (GMT 0)

Kogho is a department or commune of Ganzourgou Province in central-eastern Burkina Faso. Its capital lies at the town of Kogho. According to the 1996 census the department has a total population of 15,524.

== Towns and villages ==
- Kogho (3 780 inhabitants) (capital)
- Bassemkoukouri (807 inhabitants)
- Bendogo (1 122 inhabitants)
- Bissighin (950 inhabitants)
- Kogho-Peulh (78 inhabitants)
- Linonghin (465 inhabitants)
- Rimalga (196 inhabitants)
- Ronsin (365 inhabitants)
- Santi (573 inhabitants)
- Tangandogo (564 inhabitants)
- Tanghin-1 (1 730 inhabitants)
- Tanghin-2 (591 inhabitants)
- Tanlallé (778 inhabitants)
- Tensobtenga (1 463 inhabitants)
- Tollinghin (1 580 inhabitants)
- Zorgo (594 inhabitants)
