= Boudry, Burkina Faso =

Boudry
- Location in Burkina Faso
- Coordinates: 12°13′N 0°44′W
- Country: Burkina Faso
- Region: Plateau-Central Region
- Province: Ganzourgou
- Department: Boudry Department

Population (2019)
  - Total: 1,791

Boudry is the capital of the Boudry Department of Ganzourgou Province in central Burkina Faso.

Population
Year	Pop.	±%
1985	1,522	—
2006	2,054	+35.0%
2019	1,791	−12.8%
