= Boudry Department =

Coordinates: 12°13′00″N 0°44′00″W

Boudry
- Department
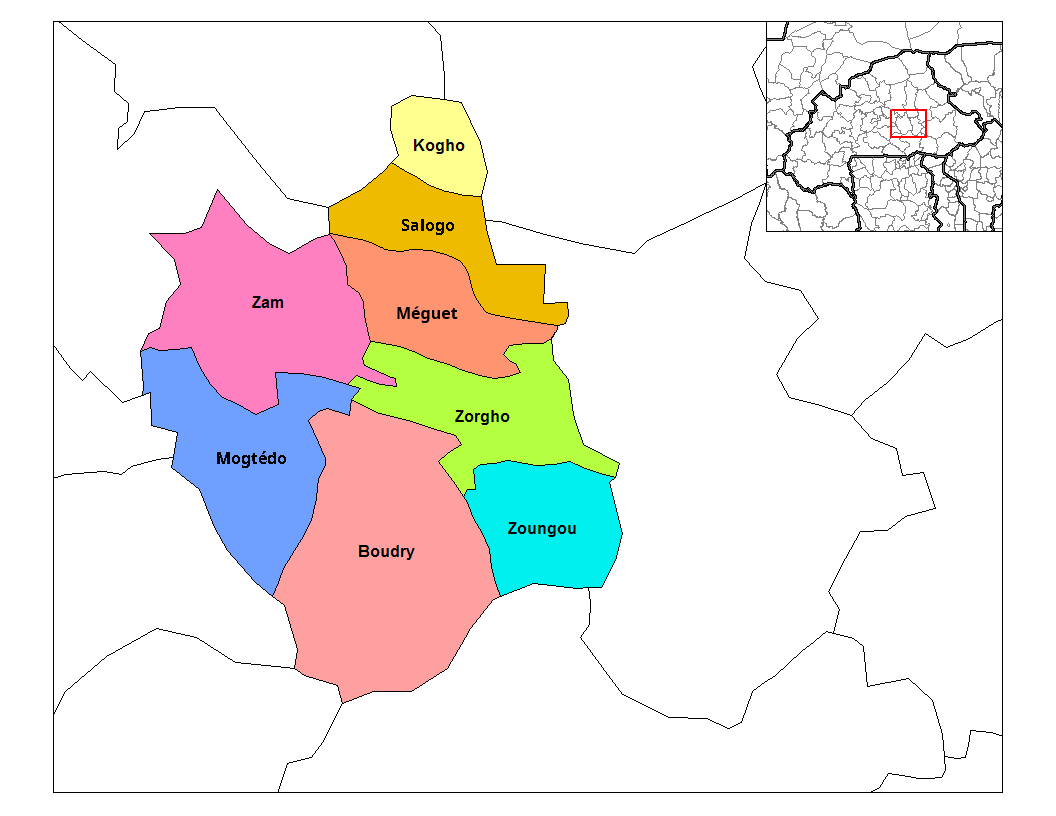
- Boudry Department's location in the province
- Country: Burkina Faso
- Province: Ganzourgou Province

Area
  - Total: 411 sq mi (1,065 km^{2})

Population (2019 census)
  - Total: 123,070
  - Density: 299.3/sq mi (115.6/km^{2})
- Time zone: UTC+0 (GMT 0)

Boudry is a department or commune of Ganzourgou Province in central-eastern Burkina Faso. Its capital is the town of Boudry. According to the 2019 census the department has a total population of 123,070.

== Towns and villages ==
- Boudry (1,682 inhabitants) (capital)
- Bagzan (320)
- Boéna (8,094)
- Boudry-Peulh (82)
- Bourma (4,079)
- Dikomtinga (342)
- Douré (596)
- Foulgo (510)
- Gondré (2,146)
- Gouingo (2,052)
- Gounghin (917)
- Ibogo (386)
- Koankin (1,656)
- Kostenga (528)
- Liguidmalguéma (575)
- Lelkom (1,223)
- Limsèga (1,579)
- Manéssé (836)
- MankargaTraditionnel (1,204)
- Mankarga (14,752)
- Nabasnonghin (877)
- Nabmalguéma (712)
- Nabinkinsma (534)
- Nabiraogtenga (714)
- Nanom (533)
- Nadioutenga (448)
- Nédogo (2,018)
- Nédogo-Peulh (155)
- Ouaongtenga (467)
- Ouayalgui (13,892)
- Payamtenga (227)
- Pittyn (1,660)
- Poédogo (804)
- Pousghin (2,463)
- Sankuissi (1,983)
- Silmiougou (260)
- Songdin (622)
- Tallé (689)
- Tamissi (161)
- Tanama (1,474)
- Tanghin (437)
- Tankoala (74)
- Tanlouka (908)
- Taonsgo (1,211)
- Tansèga (436)
- Tanwaka (1,116)
- Tinsalgo (262)
- Toyogdo (390)
- Yaïka (1,482)
- Yinsinbingba (679)
- Zanrsin (526)
- Zoangpighin (919)
