= Tandaga, Bazèga =

Tandaga
- Location in Burkina Faso
- Coordinates: 12°1′1″N 1°20′48″W
- Country: Burkina Faso
- Region: Centre-Sud Region
- Province: Bazèga Province
- Department: Kombissiri Department

Population (2019)
  - Total: 600

Tandaga is a village in the Kombissiri Department of Bazèga Province in central Burkina Faso.

Population
Year	Pop.	±%
1985	697	—
2006	937	+34.4%
2019	600	−36.0%
