= Astragalus fasciculifolius =

Scientific classification
- Kingdom: Plantae
- Clade: Embryophytes
- Clade: Tracheophytes
- Clade: Spermatophytes
- Clade: Angiosperms
- Clade: Eudicots
- Clade: Rosids
- Order: Fabales
- Family: Fabaceae
- Subfamily: Faboideae
- Genus: Astragalus
- Species: A. fasciculifolius

Binomial name
- Astragalus fasciculifolius Boiss.

Synonyms
- Astragalus afghanopersicus Kitam. Astragalus arbusculinus Bornm. & Gauba; Astragalus cornutus Bunge; Astragalus fasciculifolius subsp. arbusculinus (Bornm. & Gauba) Tietz; Tragacantha fasciculifolia (Boiss.) Kuntze; Tragacantha tebesiensis Kuntze

Species of plant

Astragalus fasciculifolius is a species of milkvetch in the family Fabaceae. Its resin is sometimes used in place of the true fleshglue, A. sarcocolla.
