= Ramatoulaye =

- Interactive map of Ramatoulaye
- Country: Burkina Faso
- Region: North Region
- Province: Yatenga
- Department: Namissiguima Department

Population (2019)
  - Total: 874

Ramatoulaye is a village in the Namissiguima Department of Yatenga Province in North Burkina Faso.

Population
| Year | Pop. | ±% |
|---|---|---|
| 2006 | 590 | — |
| 2019 | 874 | +48.1% |
