= Badnogo, Bazèga =

Badnogo
- Location in Burkina Faso
- Coordinates: 11°53′N 1°25′W
- Country: Burkina Faso
- Region: Centre-Sud Region
- Province: Bazèga Province
- Department: Kombissiri Department

Population (2019)
  - Total: 587

Badnogo, Bazèga is a village in the Kombissiri Department of Bazèga Province in central Burkina Faso.

Population
Year	Pop.	±%
1985	381	—
2006	468	+22.8%
2019	587	+25.4%
