= Zakin =

Zakin زاكين
- Village
- Location within Iran
- Coordinates: 27°49′52″N 56°18′23″E
- Country: Iran
- Province: Hormozgan
- County: Bandar Abbas
- Bakhsh: Fin
- Rural District: Siyahu

Population (2006)
  - Total: 610
- Time zone: UTC+3:30 (IRST)
  - Summer (DST): UTC+4:30 (IRDT)

Zakin (Persian: زاكين, also Romanized as Zākīn) is a village in Siyahu Rural District, Fin District, Bandar Abbas County, Hormozgan Province, Iran. At the 2006 census, its population was 610, in 144 families.
