= Zorgho =

- Location within Burkina Faso
- Coordinates: 12°15′N 0°37′W
- Country: Burkina Faso
- Region: Plateau-Central Region
- Province: Ganzourgou Province
- Department: Zorgho Department
- Elevation: 278 m (912 ft)

Population (2019)
  - Total: 35,398
- Time zone: UTC+0 (GMT)

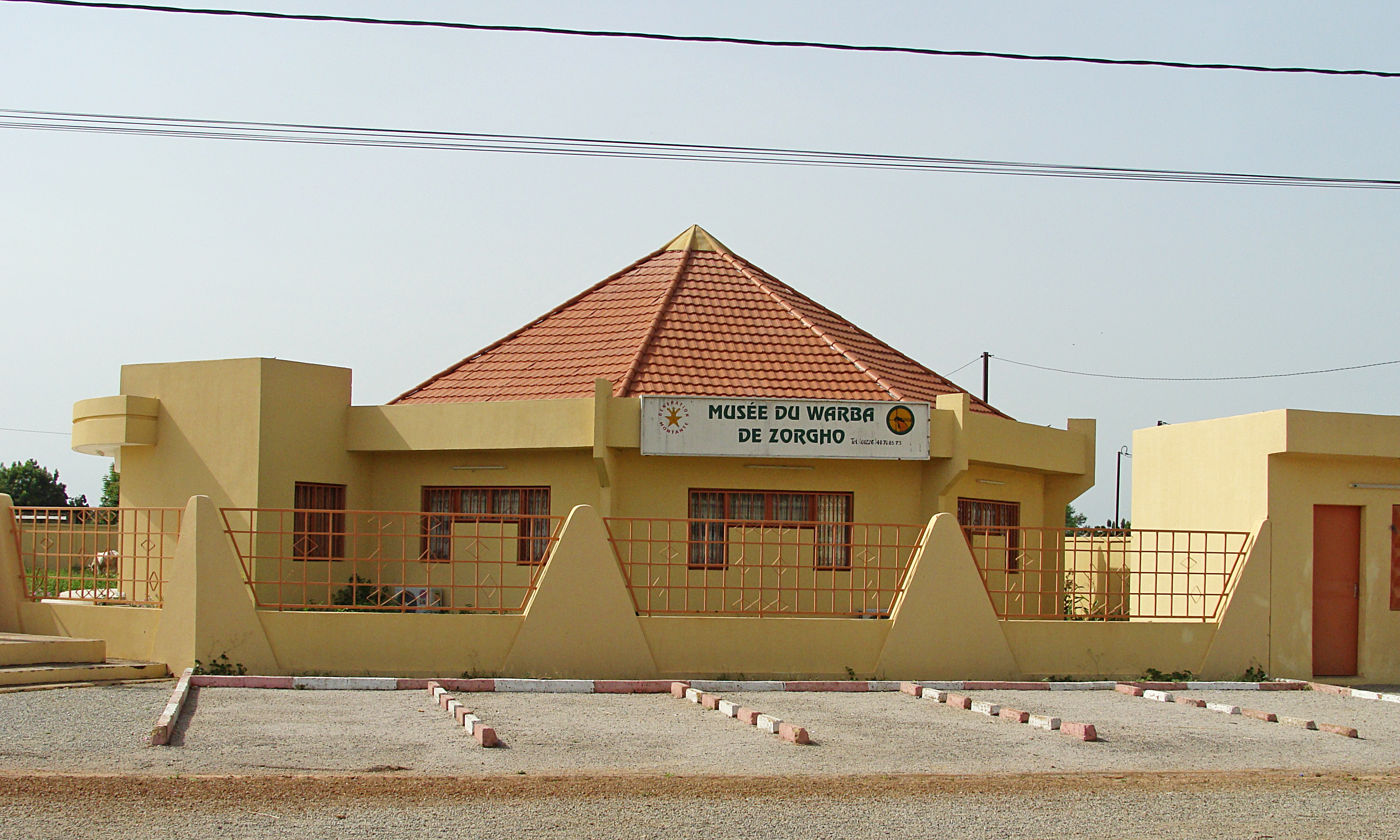
Musée du Warba de Zorgho (Museum of the Warba of Zorgho) in Zorgho

Zorgho is the capital of the Zorgho Department of Ganzourgou Province in Burkina Faso.

== Culture ==
=== Dances ===
There is a traditional Mossi dance from the town of Zorgho called warba. The dance involves the dancers moving one after another, shaking their bottoms and shoulders quickly. It was traditionally accompanied by the bendré, a gourd drum with a sheep's skin.

=== Nabasga Festival ===
Around the first week of July every year, the customary festival of Nabasga is held in the town of Zorgho to pay homage to ancestors. This festival, held by the chief of the town, the Naba Sanem of Zorgho, consists of a ritual of sacrifice to thank the ancestors for the past season and implore their blessings for the one that begins.

The party begins with a secret retreat of the chief from the village for a few days. His return to the palace marks the official beginning of the festivities. On the morning of Saturday, the dance troupes set up in the vicinity of the royal palace. Warba, maranse, yarma, liwaga, kiègba and other dances are performed to lively music. Meanwhile, the chief, with his notables, receive hundreds of high-ranking guests, arriving from across the area to his palace.

On the evening of Saturday around 5 pm, the chief leaves the town on horseback, accompanied by his ministers, his notables and some women of the royal family, each carrying a basket on their head. It simulates a journey whose destination is an old market place located a few hundred meters from the palace, where he makes three laps before making the sacrifice. In the vicinity of the path leading to this place, in front of and behind the chief, thousands of people make the movement to observe the ritual.

After the chief returns to the palace, some go to see the dancers, and others go to the bar to drink beer. The party officially ends with the tour of the market by the "queens", 3 days later. An appointment is then made for the festival of the next year.

== Population ==
Population
Year	Pop.	±%
1985	10,616	—
2006	20,462	+92.7%
2019	35,398	+73.0%
