= Andem, Gabon =

Andem
- Location in Gabon
- Coordinates: 00°11′0″N 10°40′0″E
- Country: Gabon
- Province: Moyen-Ogooué
- Department: Abanga-Bigne Department

Andem is a town in western Gabon. It is originally spoken in Fang language as Āñdém (in correct form). It was incorrectly recorded by French as Andem as there was no literal translation.

== Transport ==
It is served by a station on the Trans-Gabon Railway.

== See also ==
- Transport in Gabon
