= Bassitenga Province =

Coordinates: 12°35′N 1°25′W

Bassitenga
- Province
- Location in Burkina Faso

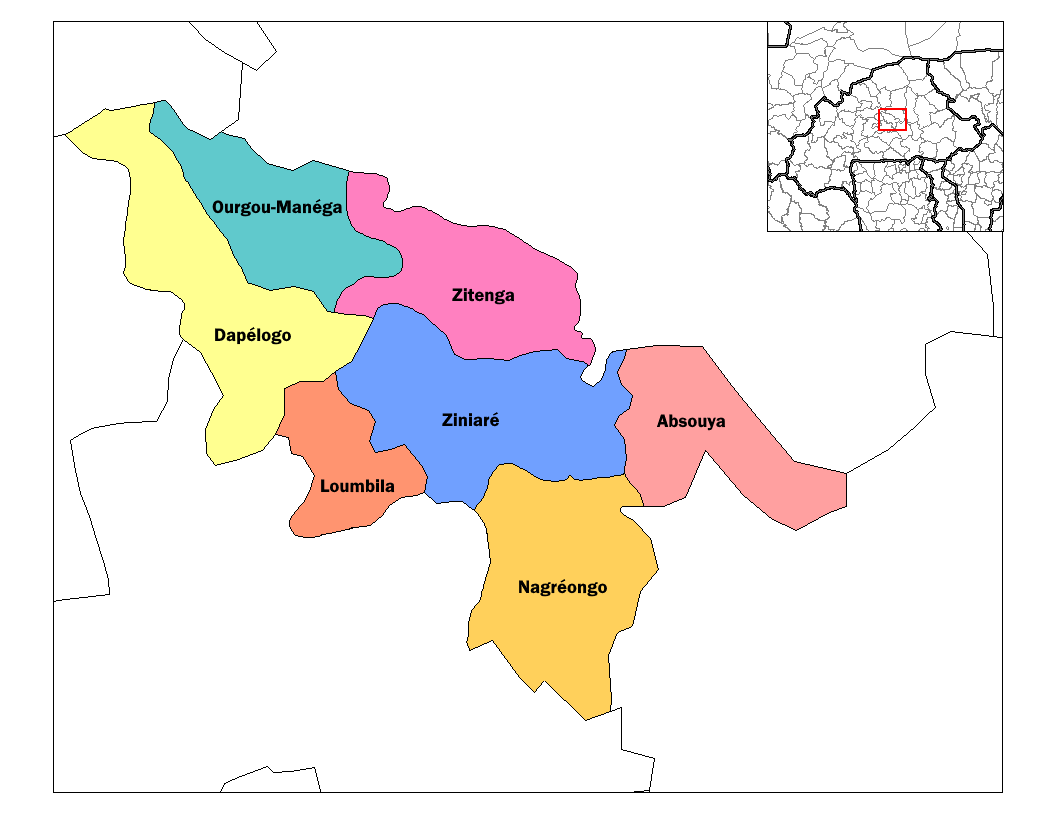
- Provincial map of its departments
- Country: Burkina Faso
- Region: Plateau-Central Region
- Capital: Ziniaré

Area
  - Province: 2,778 km^{2} (1,073 sq mi)

Population (2019 census)
  - Province: 314,514
  - Density: 113.2/km^{2} (293.2/sq mi)
  - Urban: 33,296
- Time zone: UTC+0 (GMT 0)

Bassitegna (known as Oubritenga until 2025) is one of the 45 provinces of Burkina Faso, located in its Plateau-Central Region.

Its capital is Ziniaré.

== Departments ==
Bassitenga is divided into 7 departments:

- Absouya
- Dapélogo
- Loumbila
- Nagréongo
- Ourgou-Manèga
- Ziniaré
- Zitenga

== Notable people ==
Blaise Compaoré was born in the Ziniaré department of Oubritenga. Antoinette Ouédraogo was educated at the Young Girls' College of Loumbila in the Loumbila department.

== See also ==
- Regions of Burkina Faso
- Provinces of Burkina Faso
- Departments of Burkina Faso
