= Ganzourgou Province =

Coordinates: 12°14′17″N 0°47′08″W

Ganzourgou Gãnzurgu (Mossi)
- Province
- Location in Burkina Faso

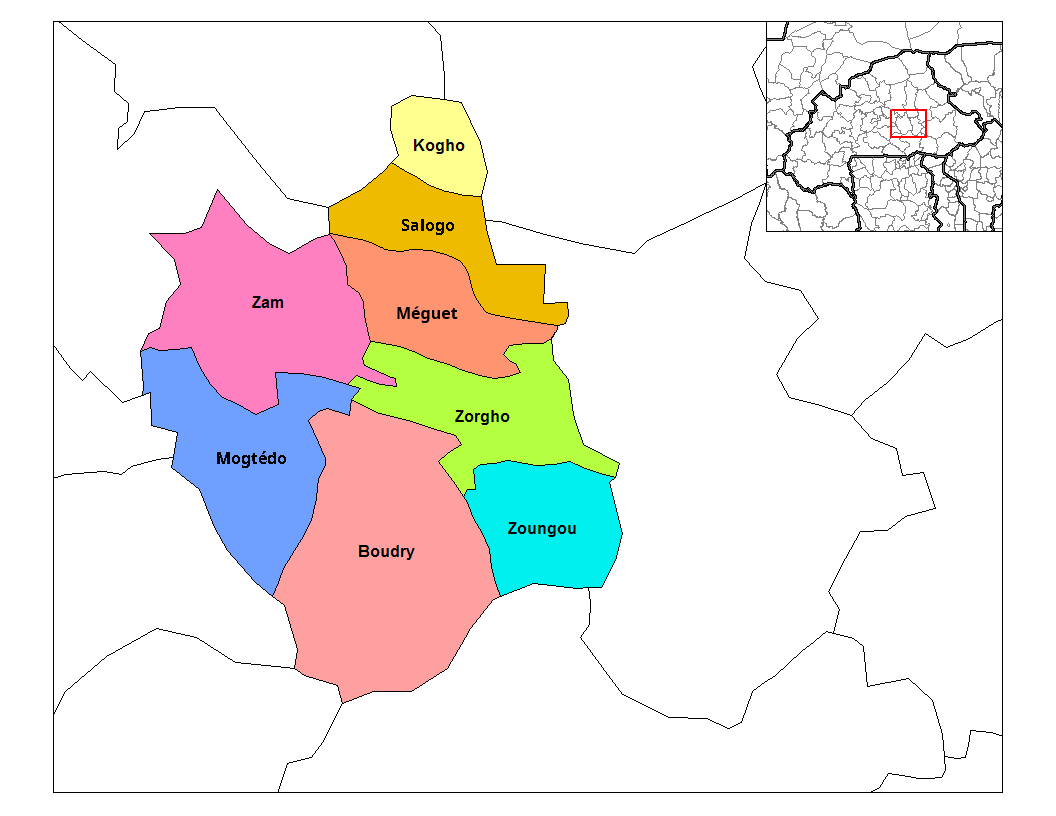
- Provincial map of its departments
- Country: Burkina Faso
- Region: Plateau-Central Region
- Capital: Zorgho

Area
  - Province: 4,179 km^{2} (1,614 sq mi)

Population (2019 census)
  - Province: 481,794
  - Density: 115.3/km^{2} (298.6/sq mi)
  - Urban: 35,398
- Time zone: UTC+0 (GMT 0)

Ganzourgou (Mossi: Gãnzurgu) is a province of Burkina Faso and is in Plateau-Central Region. The capital of Ganzourgou is Zorgho, which is along the road between Ouagadougou and Niamey, Niger. Other important localities in the province are Mogtédo and Méguet. The population of Ganzourgou in 2019 was 481,794.

Ganzourgou is divided into 8 departments:

The Departments of Ganzourgou
| Commune | Capital | Population (Census 2006) |
|---|---|---|
| Boudry Department | Boudry | 80,948 |
| Kogho Department | Kogho | 15,790 |
| Méguet Department | Méguet | 34,724 |
| Mogtédo Department | Mogtédo | 50,809 |
| Salogo Department | Salogo | 21,405 |
| Zam Department | Zam | 39,582 |
| Zorgho Department | Zorgho | 46,898 |
| Zoungou Department | Zoungou | 29,674 |

== See also ==
- Regions of Burkina Faso
- Provinces of Burkina Faso
- Departments of Burkina Faso
