= Oubri Region =

Region of Burkina Faso

Oubri Plateau-Central
- Region
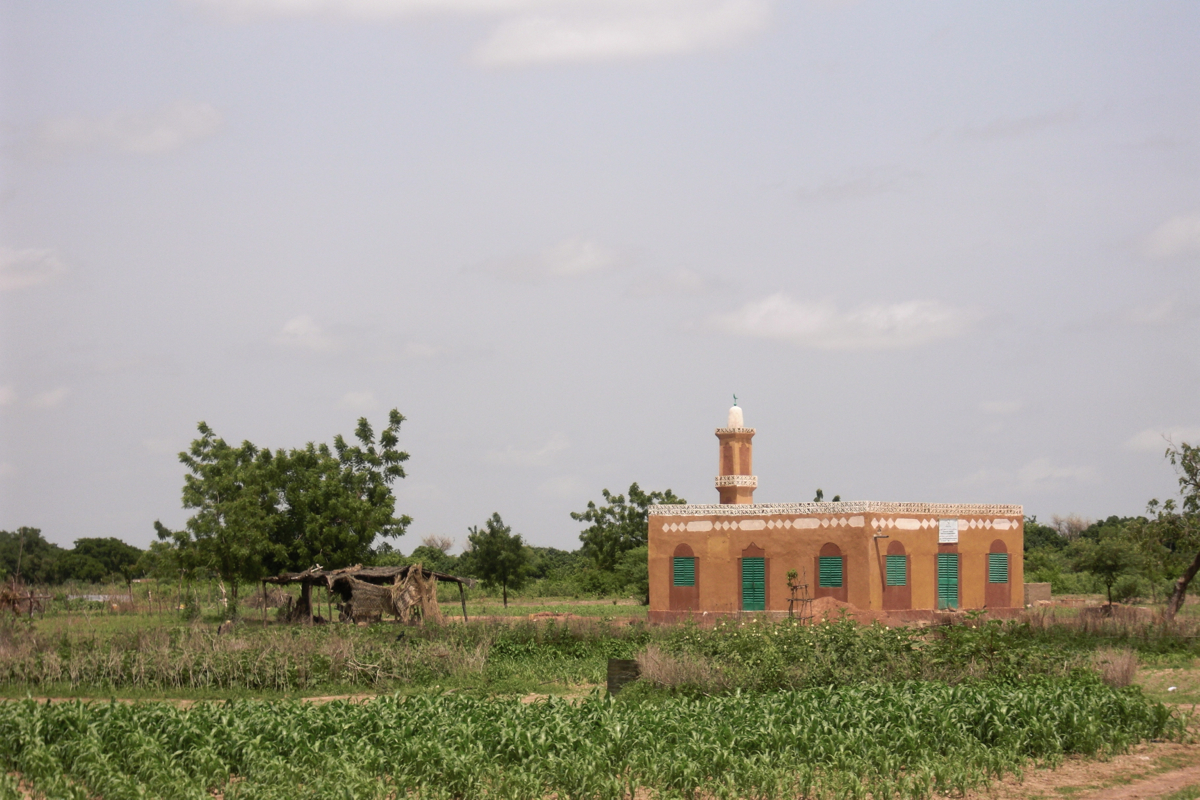

- Location in Burkina Faso
- Coordinates: 12°25′N 1°0′W
- Country: Burkina Faso
- Capital: Ziniaré

Area
  - Region: 8,545 km^{2} (3,299 sq mi)

Population (2019 census)
  - Region: 977,510
  - Density: 114.4/km^{2} (296.3/sq mi)
  - Urban: 93,734
- Time zone: UTC+0 (GMT 0)
- HDI (2017): 0.416 low · 7th

Oubri, formerly known as Plateau-Central ([pla.to sɑ̃.tʁal], "Central Plateau"), is one of Burkina Faso's 13 administrative regions. It was created on 2 July 2001 and had a population of 977,510 in 2019. The region's capital is Ziniaré. Three provinces make up the region: Ganzourgou, Kourwéogo, and Oubritenga.

As of 2019, the population of the region was 977,510 with 53.1% females. The population in the region was 4.77% of the total population of the country. The child mortality rate was 83, infant mortality rate was 59 and the mortality of children under five was 138. As of 2007, the literacy rate in the region was 21.1%, compared to a national average of 28.3%. The coverage of cereal need compared to the total production of the region was 111%.

== Geography ==
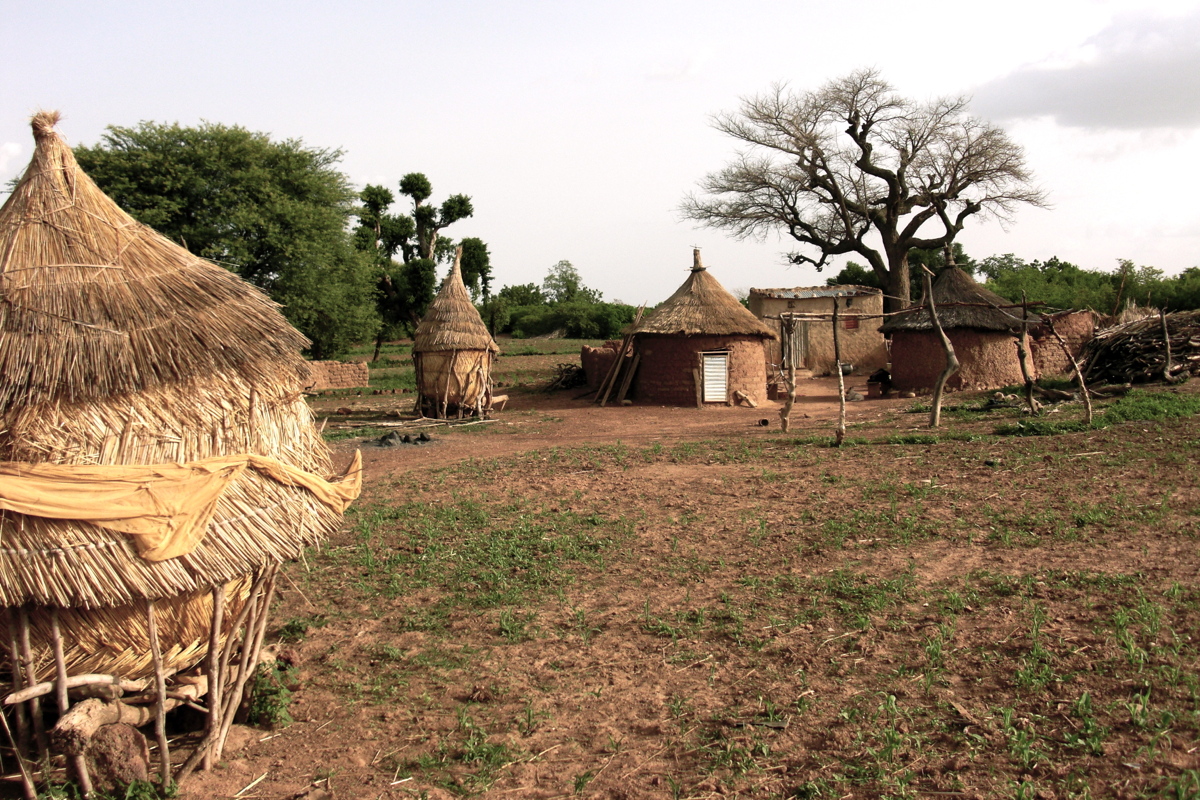
A village in the region

Most of Burkina Faso is a wide plateau formed by riverine systems and is called falaise de Banfora. There are three major rivers, the Red Volta, Black Volta and White Volta, which cut through different valleys. The climate is generally hot, with unreliable rains across different seasons. Gold and quartz are common minerals found across the country, while manganese deposits are also common. The dry season is usually from October to May, and rains are common during the wet season from June to September. The soil texture is porous and hence the yield is also poor. The average elevation is around 200 m (660 ft) to 300 m (980 ft) above mean sea level. Among West African countries, Burkina Faso has the largest elephant population, and the country is replete with game reserves. The northern regions are generally arid and usually have scrub land and semi-deserts. The principal river is the Red Volta, that originates in the northern region and drains into Ghana. The areas near the rivers usually have flies like tsetse and similium, which are carriers of sleep sickness and river blindness. The average rainfall in the region is around 25 cm (9.8 in) compared to southern regions that receive only 100 cm (39 in) rainfall.

== Demographics ==
Historical population
Year	Pop.	±% p.a.
1985	438,596	—
1996	572,154	+2.45%
2006	696,372	+1.98%
2019	977,510	+2.64%

As of 2019, the population of the region was 977,510 with 53.1% females. The population in the region was 4.77% of the total population of the country. The child mortality rate was 83, infant mortality rate was 59 and the mortality of children under five was 138. As of 2007, among the working population, there were 69.5% employees, 10.30% under employed, 19.2% inactive people, 20.2% not working and 1% unemployed people in the region.

== Economy ==
As of 2007, the literacy rate in the region was 21.1 per cent, compared to a national average of 28.3 per cent. The gross primary enrolment was 80.5 per cent, pos-primary was 25 per cent and gross secondary school enrolment was 5.6. There were 0 boys and 0 girls enrolled in the primary and post-secondary level. There were 0 teachers in primary & post-secondary level, while there were 461 teachers in post-primary and post-secondary level. As of 2007, there were 218.6 km (135.8 mi) of highways, 172.8 km (107.4 mi) of regional roads and 253.2 km (157.3 mi) of county roads. The first set of car traffic was 15, first set of two-wheeler traffic was 1,136 and the total classified road network was 645. The total corn produced during 2015 was 26,551 tonnes, cotton was 6,424 tonnes, cowpea was 65,486 tonnes, ground nut was 26,668 tonnes, millet was 59,427 tonnes, rice was 15,863 tonnes and sorghum was 120,260 tonnes. The coverage of cereal need compared to the total production of the region was 111.00 per cent.

== Administration ==
Province	Capital	2006
Ganzourgou Province	Zorgho	319,830
Kourwéogo Province	Boussé	136,017
Oubritenga Province	Ziniaré	237,290

Burkina Faso gained independence from France in 1960. It was originally called Upper Volta. There have been military coups till 1983 when Captain Thomas Sankara took control and implemented radical left-wing policies. He was ousted by Blaise Compaore, who continued for 27 years till 2014, when a popular uprising ended his rule. As per Law No.40/98/AN in 1998, Burkina Faso adhered to decentralization to provide administrative and financial autonomy to local communities. There are 13 administrative regions, each governed by a Governor. The regions are subdivided into 45 provinces, which are further subdivided into 351 communes. The communes may be urban or rural and are interchangeable. There are other administrative entities like department and village. An urban commune has typically 10,000 people under it. If any commune is not able to get 75 per cent of its planned budget in revenues for 3 years, the autonomy is taken off. The communes are administered by elected Mayors. The communes are stipulated to develop economic, social and cultural values of its citizens. A commune has financial autonomy and can interact with other communes, government agencies or international entities.
