= Kien =

Kien or Kiens may refer to:

- Kien, Bern, a village in Bern, Switzerland
- Kien, Burkina Faso, a village
- Kien (album), a 2008 album by the Japanese group Bleach
- Pine Ridge Airport (ICAO: KIEN), Pine Ridge, South Dakota, US
- Kiens, a comune in South Tyrol, Italy
- Kien (video game), a 2024 video game for the Game Boy Advance

== People ==
- Kiến Phúc (1869–1884), Vietnamese emperor
- Foo Wan Kien, Malaysian businessman
- Shih Kien, Hong Kong actor

== See also ==
- Kiên Thành (disambiguation)
- Kiến Thành (disambiguation)
