= Sokoura =

Sokoura may refer to:

== Burkina Faso ==
- Sokoura, Balé
- Sokoura I, Mangodara Department, Comoé, the first of two identically named villages in the Mangodara Department
- Sokoura II, Mangodara Department, Comoé, the second of two identically named villages in the Mangodara Department
- Sokoura, Tiéfora Department, Comoé

== Mali ==
- Sokoura, Mali
