= Doutie =

- Location in Burkina Faso
- Coordinates: 10°11′50″N 4°08′07″W
- Country: Burkina Faso
- Region: Cascades Region
- Province: Comoé Province
- Department: Sidéradougou Department

Population (2019)
  - Total: 3,525

Doutie is a town in the Sidéradougou Department of Comoé Province in south-western Burkina Faso.

Population
Year	Pop.	±%
1985	206	—
2006	2,029	+885.0%
2019	3,525	+73.7%
