= Banakoro =

Banakoro Bandakoro
- Interactive map of Banakoro
- Coordinates: 10°25′52″N 4°16′48″W
- Country: Burkina Faso
- Region: Cascades Region
- Province: Comoé Province
- Department: Sidéradougou Department

Population (2019)
  - Total: 3,104

Banakoro is a town in the Sidéradougou Department of Comoé Province in south-western Burkina Faso.

Population
Year	Pop.	±%
1985	531	—
2006	1,778	+234.8%
2019	3,104	+74.6%
