= Faradjan =

Faradjan Faradian
- Interactive map of Faradjan
- Coordinates: 10°22′17″N 4°11′57″W
- Country: Burkina Faso
- Region: Cascades Region
- Province: Comoé Province
- Department: Sidéradougou Department

Population (2019)
  - Total: 6,042

Faradjan is a town in the Sidéradougou Department of Comoé Province in south-western Burkina Faso.

Population
Year	Pop.	±%
1985	1,076	—
2006	3,129	+190.8%
2019	6,042	+93.1%
