= Bodadiougou =

Bodadiougou Badadiougou, Bodadougou
- Interactive map of Bodadiougou
- Coordinates: 10°43′34″N 4°54′06″W
- Country: Burkina Faso
- Region: Cascades Region
- Province: Comoé Province
- Department: Banfora Department

Population (2019)
  - Total: 2,202

Bodadiougou is a town in the Banfora Department of Comoé Province in south-western Burkina Faso.

Population
Year	Pop.	±%
1985	962	—
2006	1,242	+29.1%
2019	2,202	+77.3%
