= Dionouna =

Dionouna Diounouna, Dionounou
- Location in Burkina Faso
- Coordinates: 10°28′56″N 4°48′57″W
- Country: Burkina Faso
- Region: Cascades Region
- Province: Comoé Province
- Department: Banfora Department

Population (2019)
  - Total: 2,130

Dionouna is a town in the Banfora Department of Comoé Province in south-western Burkina Faso.

Population
Year	Pop.	±%
1985	1,478	—
2006	1,484	+0.4%
2019	2,130	+43.5%
