= Toukoro, Comoé =

Toukoro
- Location in Burkina Faso
- Coordinates: 10°24′18″N 3°51′41″W
- Country: Burkina Faso
- Region: Cascades Region
- Province: Comoé Province
- Department: Ouo Department

Population (2019)
  - Total: 936

Toukoro is a village in the Ouo Department of Comoé Province in south-western Burkina Faso.

Population
Year	Pop.	±%
1985	274	—
2006	214	−21.9%
2019	936	+337.4%
