= Bondorola =

- Location in Burkina Faso
- Coordinates: 10°32′50″N 4°34′47″W
- Country: Burkina Faso
- Region: Cascades Region
- Province: Comoé Province
- Department: Tiéfora Department

Population (2019)
  - Total: 1,167

Bondorola is a village in the Tiéfora Department of Comoé Province in south-western Burkina Faso.

Population
Year	Pop.	±%
1985	748	—
2006	672	−10.2%
2019	1,167	+73.7%
