= Panga, Burkina Faso =

Panga
- Location in Burkina Faso
- Coordinates: 10°22′00″N 4°58′00″W
- Country: Burkina Faso
- Region: Cascades Region
- Province: Comoé Province
- Department: Soubakaniédougou Department

Population (2019)
  - Total: 3,758

Panga is a town that is situated in the Soubakaniédougou Department of Comoé Province in south-western Burkina Faso.

Population
Year	Pop.	±%
1985	1,765	—
2006	2,438	+38.1%
2019	3,758	+54.1%
