= Dapala =

- Location in Burkina Faso
- Coordinates: 10°27′37″N 3°45′34″W
- Country: Burkina Faso
- Region: Cascades Region
- Province: Comoé Province
- Department: Ouo Department

Population (2019)
  - Total: 1,424

Dapala is a village in the Ouo Department of Comoé Province in south-western Burkina Faso.

Population
Year	Pop.	±%
1985	157	—
2006	868	+452.9%
2019	1,424	+64.1%
