= Norkama =

- Interactive map of Norkama
- Coordinates: 10°41′17″N 3°43′42″W
- Country: Burkina Faso
- Region: Cascades Region
- Province: Comoé Province
- Department: Ouo Department

Population (2019)
  - Total: 1,624

Norkama is a town in the Ouo Department of Comoé Province in south-western Burkina Faso.

Population
Year	Pop.	±%
1985	541	—
2006	1,166	+115.5%
2019	1,624	+39.3%
