= Madiasso =

- Interactive map of Madiasso
- Coordinates: 10°13′05″N 4°19′02″W
- Country: Burkina Faso
- Region: Cascades Region
- Province: Comoé Province
- Department: Mangodara Department

Population (2019)
  - Total: 7,200

Madiasso is a town in the Mangodara Department of Comoé Province in south-western Burkina Faso.

Population
Year	Pop.	±%
1985	669	—
2006	4,929	+636.8%
2019	7,200	+46.1%
