= Sakora =

- Interactive map of Sakora
- Coordinates: 10°24′28″N 4°37′30″W
- Country: Burkina Faso
- Region: Cascades Region
- Province: Comoé Province
- Department: Tiéfora Department

Population (2019)
  - Total: 5,525

Sakora is a town in the Tiéfora Department of Comoé Province in southwestern Burkina Faso.

Population
Year	Pop.	±%
1985	547	—
2006	1,642	+200.2%
2019	5,525	+236.5%
