= Siniena =

Siniena Sinyana
- Interactive map of Siniena
- Coordinates: 10°32′07″N 4°46′18″W
- Country: Burkina Faso
- Region: Cascades Region
- Province: Comoé Province
- Department: Banfora Department

Population (2019)
  - Total: 6,216

Siniena is a town in the Banfora Department of Comoé Province in south-western Burkina Faso.

Population
Year	Pop.	±%
1985	3,207	—
2006	4,705	+46.7%
2019	6,216	+32.1%
