= Djanga, Burkina Faso =

Djanga
- Country: Burkina Faso
- Region: Cascades Region
- Province: Comoé Province
- Department: Sidéradougou Department

Population (2019)
  - Total: 1,238

Djanga is a town in the Sidéradougou Department of Comoé Province in south-western Burkina Faso.

Population
Year	Pop.	±%
1985	371	—
2006	883	+138.0%
2019	1,238	+40.2%
