= Tiempagora =

- Location in Burkina Faso
- Coordinates: 10°24′44″N 4°48′01″W
- Country: Burkina Faso
- Region: Cascades Region
- Province: Comoé Province
- Department: Banfora Department

Population (2019)
  - Total: 1,248

Tiempagora is a village in the Banfora Department of Comoé Province in south-western Burkina Faso.

Population
Year	Pop.	±%
1985	550	—
2006	869	+58.0%
2019	1,248	+43.6%
