= Kouendi =

Kouendi Kouandi
- Country: Burkina Faso
- Region: Cascades Region
- Province: Comoé Province
- Department: Sidéradougou Department

Population (2019)
  - Total: 9,563

Kouendi is a town in the Sidéradougou Department of Comoé Province in south-western Burkina Faso.

Population
| Year | Pop. | ±% |
|---|---|---|
| 1985 | 1,411 | — |
| 2006 | 4,762 | +237.5% |
| 2019 | 9,563 | +100.8% |
