= Massade-Yirikoro =

- Location in Burkina Faso
- Coordinates: 9°42′27″N 4°24′21″W
- Country: Burkina Faso
- Region: Cascades Region
- Province: Comoé Province
- Department: Mangodara Department

Population (2019)
  - Total: 361

Massade-Yirikoro is a village in the Mangodara Department of Comoé Province in south-western Burkina Faso.

Population
Year	Pop.	±%
1985	72	—
2006	380	+427.8%
2019	361	−5.0%
