= Larabin =

- Interactive map of Larabin
- Coordinates: 9°55′23″N 4°20′07″W
- Country: Burkina Faso
- Region: Cascades Region
- Province: Comoé Province
- Department: Mangodara Department

Population (2019)
  - Total: 1,093

Larabin is a village in the Mangodara Department of Comoé Province in south-western Burkina Faso.

Population
Year	Pop.	±%
1985	422	—
2006	648	+53.6%
2019	1,093	+68.7%
