= Labola Koumoussanra =

Labola Koumoussanra Labola Koumoussara
- Interactive map of Labola Koumoussanra
- Coordinates: 10°35′56″N 4°36′37″W
- Country: Burkina Faso
- Region: Cascades Region
- Province: Comoé Province
- Department: Tiéfora Department

Population (2019)
  - Total: 877

Labola Koumoussanra is a village in the Tiéfora Department of Comoé Province in south-western Burkina Faso.

Population
Year	Pop.	±%
1985	1,079	—
2006	1,839	+70.4%
2019	877	−52.3%
