= Kassande =

- Location in Burkina Faso
- Coordinates: 10°31′50″N 4°17′09″W
- Country: Burkina Faso
- Region: Cascades Region
- Province: Comoé Province
- Department: Sidéradougou Department

Population (2019)
  - Total: 2,809

Kassande is a town in the Sidéradougou Department of Comoé Province in south-western Burkina Faso.

Population
Year	Pop.	±%
2006	1,459	—
2019	2,809	+92.5%
