= Touroukoro =

Touroukoro Torokoro
- Location in Burkina Faso
- Coordinates: 10°02′14″N 4°24′08″W
- Country: Burkina Faso
- Region: Cascades Region
- Province: Comoé Province
- Department: Mangodara Department

Population (2019)
  - Total: 6,036

Touroukoro is a town in the Mangodara Department of Comoé Province in south-western Burkina Faso.

Population
Year	Pop.	±%
1985	788	—
2006	4,688	+494.9%
2019	6,036	+28.8%
