= Diongolo =

Diongolo Diougolo
- Location in Burkina Faso
- Coordinates: 10°33′59″N 4°52′10″W
- Country: Burkina Faso
- Region: Cascades Region
- Province: Comoé Province
- Department: Banfora Department

Population (2019)
  - Total: 2,694

Diongolo is a town in the Banfora Department of Comoé Province in south-western Burkina Faso.

Population
Year	Pop.	±%
1985	1,403	—
2006	2,135	+52.2%
2019	2,694	+26.2%
