= Lemouroudougou =

- Interactive map of Lemouroudougou
- Coordinates: 10°40′41″N 4°47′08″W
- Country: Burkina Faso
- Region: Cascades Region
- Province: Comoé Province
- Department: Banfora Department

Population (2019)
  - Total: 1,372

Lemouroudougou is a town in the Banfora Department of Comoé Province in south-western Burkina Faso.

Population
Year	Pop.	±%
1985	601	—
2006	1,513	+151.7%
2019	1,372	−9.3%
