= Diamon =

Coordinates: 10°48′23″N 5°02′45″W

Diamon Diomou
- Interactive map of Diamon
- Country: Burkina Faso
- Region: Cascades Region
- Province: Comoé Province
- Department: Moussodougou Department

Population (2019)
  - Total: 1,343

Diamon is a village in the Moussodougou Department of Comoé Province in south-western Burkina Faso.

Population
Year	Pop.	±%
1985	472	—
2006	1,016	+115.3%
2019	1,343	+32.2%
