= Nadrifa =

- Interactive map of Nadrifa
- Coordinates: 10°48′31″N 4°25′02″W
- Country: Burkina Faso
- Region: Cascades Region
- Province: Comoé Province
- Department: Tiéfora Department

Population (2019)
  - Total: 253

Nadrifa is a village in the Tiéfora Department of Comoé Province in south-western Burkina Faso.

Population
Year	Pop.	±%
2006	834	—
2019	253	−69.7%
