= Diaya =

- Interactive map of Diaya
- Coordinates: 9°45′56″N 4°24′41″W
- Country: Burkina Faso
- Region: Cascades Region
- Province: Comoé Province
- Department: Mangodara Department

Population (2019)
  - Total: 1,947

Diaya is a village in the Mangodara Department of Comoé Province in south-western Burkina Faso.

Population
Year	Pop.	±%
2006	1,622	—
2019	1,947	+20.0%
