= Gontiedougou =

- Interactive map of Gontiedougou
- Coordinates: 9°47′08″N 4°15′09″W
- Country: Burkina Faso
- Region: Cascades Region
- Province: Comoé Province
- Department: Mangodara Department

Population (2019)
  - Total: 2,026

Gontiedougou is a town in the Mangodara Department of Comoé Province in south-western Burkina Faso.

Population
Year	Pop.	±%
2006	1,694	—
2019	2,026	+19.6%
