= Bogote =

Coordinates: 10°25′36″N 4°0′41″W

Bogote Bokate
- Interactive map of Bogote
- Country: Burkina Faso
- Region: Cascades Region
- Province: Comoé Province
- Department: Sidéradougou Department

Population (2019)
  - Total: 2,737

Bogote is a town in the Sidéradougou Department of Comoé Province in south-western Burkina Faso.

Population
Year	Pop.	±%
1985	426	—
2006	1,130	+165.3%
2019	2,737	+142.2%
