= Niamango =

Niamango Nyamango
- Interactive map of Niamango
- Coordinates: 9°49′47″N 4°20′13″W
- Country: Burkina Faso
- Region: Cascades Region
- Province: Comoé Province
- Department: Mangodara Department

Population (2019)
  - Total: 854

Niamango is a village in the Mangodara Department of Comoé Province in south-western Burkina Faso.

Population
Year	Pop.	±%
2006	544	—
2019	854	+57.0%
