= Labola Sankrala =

- Interactive map of Labola Sankrala
- Coordinates: 10°39′26″N 4°39′56″W
- Country: Burkina Faso
- Region: Cascades Region
- Province: Comoé Province
- Department: Tiéfora Department

Population (2019)
  - Total: 1,231

Labola Sankrala is a village in the Tiéfora Department of Comoé Province in south-western Burkina Faso.

Population
Year	Pop.	±%
1985	633	—
2006	443	−30.0%
2019	1,231	+177.9%
