= Kogoue =

- Interactive map of Kogoue
- Country: Burkina Faso
- Region: Cascades Region
- Province: Comoé Province
- Department: Sidéradougou Department

Population (2019)
  - Total: 1,064

Kogoue is a town in the Sidéradougou Department of Comoé Province in south-western Burkina Faso.

Population
| Year | Pop. | ±% |
|---|---|---|
| 2006 | 541 | — |
| 2019 | 1,064 | +96.7% |
