= Yade =

- Interactive map of Yade
- Coordinates: 10°34′49″N 4°22′42″W
- Country: Burkina Faso
- Region: Cascades Region
- Province: Comoé Province
- Department: Sidéradougou Department

Population (2019)
  - Total: 2,623

Yade is a town in the Sidéradougou Department of Comoé Province in south-western Burkina Faso.

Population
Year	Pop.	±%
1985	1,075	—
2006	1,587	+47.6%
2019	2,623	+65.3%
