= Gouin-Gouin =

- Interactive map of Gouin-Gouin
- Coordinates: 10°41′44″N 4°13′01″W
- Country: Burkina Faso
- Region: Cascades Region
- Province: Comoé Province
- Department: Sidéradougou Department

Population (2019)
  - Total: 1,831

Gouin-Gouin is a town in the Sidéradougou Department of Comoé Province in south-western Burkina Faso.

Population
Year	Pop.	±%
1985	773	—
2006	732	−5.3%
2019	1,831	+150.1%
