= Djandoro =

Djandoro Diandoro
- Interactive map of Djandoro
- Coordinates: 10°33′14″N 4°25′37″W
- Country: Burkina Faso
- Region: Cascades Region
- Province: Comoé Province
- Department: Tiéfora Department

Population (2019)
  - Total: 2,601

Djandoro is a town in the Tiéfora Department of Comoé Province in south-western Burkina Faso.

Population
Year	Pop.	±%
2006	1,859	—
2019	2,601	+39.9%
