= Malon, Burkina Faso =

Malon
- Interactive map of Malon
- Coordinates: 10°44′13″N 4°46′57″W
- Country: Burkina Faso
- Region: Cascades Region
- Province: Comoé Province
- Department: Bérégadougou Department

Population (2019)
  - Total: 192

Malon is a village in the Bérégadougou Department of Comoé Province in south-western Burkina Faso.

Population
Year	Pop.	±%
1985	140	—
2006	167	+19.3%
2019	192	+15.0%
