= Banakelesso =

Banakelesso Bandakelesso
- Interactive map of Banakelesso
- Coordinates: 9°50′05″N 4°22′18″W
- Country: Burkina Faso
- Region: Cascades Region
- Province: Comoé Province
- Department: Mangodara Department

Population (2019)
  - Total: 230

Banakelesso is a village in the Mangodara Department of Comoé Province in south-western Burkina Faso.

Population
Year	Pop.	±%
1985	94	—
2006	172	+83.0%
2019	230	+33.7%
