= Logue =

- Location in Burkina Faso
- Coordinates: 10°17′02″N 3°51′39″W
- Country: Burkina Faso
- Region: Cascades Region
- Province: Comoé Province
- Department: Ouo Department

Population (2019)
  - Total: 3,639

Logue is a town in the Ouo Department of Comoé Province in south-western Burkina Faso.

Population
Year	Pop.	±%
1985	545	—
2006	1,879	+244.8%
2019	3,639	+93.7%
