= Kitobama =

- Interactive map of Kitobama
- Coordinates: 10°30′31″N 4°47′03″W
- Country: Burkina Faso
- Region: Cascades Region
- Province: Comoé Province
- Department: Banfora Department

Population (2019)
  - Total: 233

Kitobama is a village in the Banfora Department of Comoé Province in south-western Burkina Faso.

Population
Year	Pop.	±%
1985	324	—
2006	166	−48.8%
2019	233	+40.4%
