= Gouindougouba =

- Location in Burkina Faso
- Coordinates: 10°32′42″N 5°05′16″W
- Country: Burkina Faso
- Region: Cascades Region
- Province: Comoé Province
- Department: Soubakaniédougou Department

Population (2019)
  - Total: 2,527

Gouindougouba is a town in the Soubakaniédougou Department of Comoé Province in south-western Burkina Faso.

Population
Year	Pop.	±%
1985	1,406	—
2006	1,954	+39.0%
2019	2,527	+29.3%
