= Sankara, Burkina Faso =

Sankara
- Interactive map of Sankara
- Coordinates: 10°25′27″N 4°37′01″W
- Country: Burkina Faso
- Region: Cascades Region
- Province: Comoé Province
- Department: Tiéfora Department

Population (2019)
  - Total: 2,032

Sankara is a village in the Tiéfora Department of Comoé Province in south-western Burkina Faso. This village would be named in memory of Thomas Sankara, Military, revolutionary and President of Burkina Faso.

Population
Year	Pop.	±%
1985	1,630	—
2006	1,137	−30.2%
2019	2,032	+78.7%
