= Moussoumourou =

Coordinates: 10°36′25″N 4°26′36″W

- Interactive map of Moussoumourou
- Country: Burkina Faso
- Region: Cascades Region
- Province: Comoé Province
- Department: Tiéfora Department

Population (2019)
  - Total: 1,441

Moussoumourou is a town in the Tiéfora Department of Comoé Province in south-western Burkina Faso.

Population
Year	Pop.	±%
2006	187	—
2019	1,441	+670.6%
