= Noumoutiedougou =

- Location in Burkina Faso
- Coordinates: 9°55′01″N 4°16′30″W
- Country: Burkina Faso
- Region: Cascades Region
- Province: Comoé Province
- Department: Mangodara Department

Population (2019)
  - Total: 2,813

Noumoutiedougou is a town in the Mangodara Department of Comoé Province in south-western Burkina Faso.

Population
Year	Pop.	±%
1985	994	—
2006	3,859	+288.2%
2019	2,813	−27.1%
