= Sitiena =

- Location in Burkina Faso
- Coordinates: 10°36′16″N 4°48′18″W
- Country: Burkina Faso
- Region: Cascades Region
- Province: Comoé Province
- Department: Banfora Department

Population (2019)
  - Total: 2,018

Sitiena is a town in the Banfora Department of Comoé Province in south-western Burkina Faso.

Population
Year	Pop.	±%
1985	1,729	—
2006	1,956	+13.1%
2019	2,018	+3.2%
