= Kokanko =

Kokanko Konkano
- Country: Burkina Faso
- Region: Cascades Region
- Province: Comoé Province
- Department: Sidéradougou Department

Population (2019)
  - Total: 2,104

Kokanko is a town in the Sidéradougou Department of Comoé Province in south-western Burkina Faso.

Population
Year	Pop.	±%
1985	258	—
2006	1,868	+624.0%
2019	2,104	+12.6%
