= Dierisso =

Coordinates: 10°34′17″N 4°18′28″W

Dierisso Dielisso
- Interactive map of Dierisso
- Country: Burkina Faso
- Region: Cascades Region
- Province: Comoé Province
- Department: Sidéradougou Department

Population (2019)
  - Total: 899

Dierisso is a village in the Sidéradougou Department of Comoé Province in south-western Burkina Faso.

Population
Year	Pop.	±%
1985	332	—
2006	617	+85.8%
2019	899	+45.7%
