= Loubora =

- Interactive map of Loubora
- Coordinates: 10°30′11″N 4°34′21″W
- Country: Burkina Faso
- Region: Cascades Region
- Province: Comoé Province
- Department: Tiéfora Department

Population (2019)
  - Total: 547

Loubora is a village in the Tiéfora Department of Comoé Province in south-western Burkina Faso.

Population
Year	Pop.	±%
2006	898	—
2019	547	−39.1%
