= Konkan, Burkina Faso =

Konkan Kongan
- Interactive map of Konkan
- Coordinates: 10°39′17″N 4°07′14″W
- Country: Burkina Faso
- Region: Cascades Region
- Province: Comoé Province
- Department: Sidéradougou Department

Population (2019)
  - Total: 1,054

Konkan is a village in the Sidéradougou Department of Comoé Province in south-western Burkina Faso.

Population
Year	Pop.	±%
1985	115	—
2006	283	+146.1%
2019	1,054	+272.4%
