= Konamisse =

- Interactive map of Konamisse
- Coordinates: 10°18′02″N 3°57′34″W
- Country: Burkina Faso
- Region: Cascades Region
- Province: Comoé Province
- Department: Ouo Department

Population (2019)
  - Total: 2,524

Konamisse is a village in the Ouo Department of Comoé Province in south-western Burkina Faso.

Population
Year	Pop.	±%
1985	353	—
2006	1,354	+283.6%
2019	2,524	+86.4%
