= Sikane =

- Interactive map of Sikane
- Coordinates: 10°33′24″N 4°22′41″W
- Country: Burkina Faso
- Region: Cascades Region
- Province: Comoé Province
- Department: Tiéfora Department

Population (2019)
  - Total: 1,159

Sikane is a village in the Tiéfora Department of Comoé Province in south-western Burkina Faso.

Population
Year	Pop.	±%
2006	897	—
2019	1,159	+29.2%
