= Niankar =

Niankar Niankara
- Location in Burkina Faso
- Coordinates: 10°33′10″N 4°48′00″W
- Country: Burkina Faso
- Region: Cascades Region
- Province: Comoé Province
- Department: Banfora Department

Population (2019)
  - Total: 1,936

Niankar is a town in the Banfora Department of Comoé Province in south-western Burkina Faso.

Population
Year	Pop.	±%
1985	1,331	—
2006	1,840	+38.2%
2019	1,936	+5.2%
