= Serefedougou =

- Location in Burkina Faso
- Coordinates: 10°43′51″N 4°41′06″W
- Country: Burkina Faso
- Region: Cascades Region
- Province: Comoé Province
- Department: Bérégadougou Department

Population (2019)
  - Total: 977

Serefedougou is a village in the Bérégadougou Department of Comoé Province in south-western Burkina Faso.

Population
Year	Pop.	±%
1985	594	—
2006	779	+31.1%
2019	977	+25.4%
