= Toumousseni =

Toumousseni Toumoussen
- Location in Burkina Faso
- Coordinates: 10°37′47″N 4°54′17″W
- Country: Burkina Faso
- Region: Cascades Region
- Province: Comoé Province
- Department: Banfora Department

Population (2019)
  - Total: 3,360

Toumousseni is a town in the Banfora Department of Comoé Province in south-western Burkina Faso.

Population
Year	Pop.	±%
1985	2,424	—
2006	3,126	+29.0%
2019	3,360	+7.5%
