= Banagoubou =

Banagoubou Banagourou
- Country: Burkina Faso
- Region: Cascades Region
- Province: Comoé Province
- Department: Sidéradougou Department

Population (2019)
  - Total: 1,448

Banagoubou is a village in the Sidéradougou Department of Comoé Province in south-western Burkina Faso.

Population
| Year | Pop. | ±% |
|---|---|---|
| 1985 | 301 | — |
| 2006 | 518 | +72.1% |
| 2019 | 1,448 | +179.5% |
