= Bate, Burkina Faso =

Bate
- Country: Burkina Faso
- Region: Cascades Region
- Province: Comoé Province
- Department: Sidéradougou Department

Population (2019)
  - Total: 2,261

Bate is a town in the Sidéradougou Department of Comoé Province in south-western Burkina Faso.

Population
Year	Pop.	±%
2006	1,306	—
2019	2,261	+73.1%
