= Dalamba =

- Country: Burkina Faso
- Region: Cascades Region
- Province: Comoé Province
- Department: Sidéradougou Department

Population (2005 est.)
  - Total: 480

Dalamba is a village in the Sidéradougou Department of Comoé Province in south-western Burkina Faso. The village has a population of 480.
