= Gangasse =

- Interactive map of Gangasse
- Coordinates: 10°31′06″N 3°48′19″W
- Country: Burkina Faso
- Region: Cascades Region
- Province: Comoé Province
- Department: Ouo Department

Population (2019)
  - Total: 2,310

Gangasse is a village in the Ouo Department of Comoé Province in south-western Burkina Faso.

Population
Year	Pop.	±%
1985	337	—
2006	1,535	+355.5%
2019	2,310	+50.5%
