= Damana =

Damana Damassa
- Location in Burkina Faso
- Coordinates: 10°21′52″N 5°03′01″W
- Country: Burkina Faso
- Region: Cascades Region
- Province: Comoé Province
- Department: Soubakaniédougou Department

Population (2019)
  - Total: 1,788

Damana is a town in the Soubakaniédougou Department of Comoé Province in south-western Burkina Faso.

Population
Year	Pop.	±%
1985	795	—
2006	1,485	+86.8%
2019	1,788	+20.4%
