= Dramandougou =

- Location in Burkina Faso
- Coordinates: 10°50′06″N 4°31′59″W
- Country: Burkina Faso
- Region: Cascades Region
- Province: Comoé Province
- Department: Tiéfora Department

Population (2019)
  - Total: 1,831

Dramandougou is a town in the Tiéfora Department of Comoé Province in south-western Burkina Faso.

Population
| Year | Pop. | ±% |
|---|---|---|
| 2006 | 979 | — |
| 2019 | 1,831 | +87.0% |
