= Ganso =

Ganso Gansa
- Interactive map of Ganso
- Coordinates: 9°53′28″N 4°19′01″W
- Country: Burkina Faso
- Region: Cascades Region
- Province: Comoé Province
- Department: Mangodara Department

Population (2019)
  - Total: 886

Ganso is a village in the Mangodara Department of Comoé Province in south-western Burkina Faso.

Population
Year	Pop.	±%
1985	446	—
2006	711	+59.4%
2019	886	+24.6%
