= Tiekouna =

- Location in Burkina Faso
- Coordinates: 10°37′48″N 4°48′28″W
- Country: Burkina Faso
- Region: Cascades Region
- Province: Comoé Province
- Department: Banfora Department

Population (2019)
  - Total: 1,171

Tiekouna is a village in the Banfora Department of Comoé Province in south-western Burkina Faso.

Population
Year	Pop.	±%
1985	1,576	—
2006	1,166	−26.0%
2019	1,171	+0.4%
