= Labola Foukara =

- Interactive map of Labola Foukara
- Coordinates: 10°38′26″N 4°36′49″W
- Country: Burkina Faso
- Region: Cascades Region
- Province: Comoé Province
- Department: Tiéfora Department

Population (2019)
  - Total: 532

Labola Foukara is a village in the Tiéfora Department of Comoé Province in south-western Burkina Faso.

Population
Year	Pop.	±%
1985	261	—
2006	2,231	+754.8%
2019	532	−76.2%
