= Houetiara =

Houetiara Houintiara, Wintiara
- Interactive map of Houetiara
- Coordinates: 10°28′24″N 4°41′40″W
- Country: Burkina Faso
- Region: Cascades Region
- Province: Comoé Province
- Department: Tiéfora Department

Population (2019)
  - Total: 1,823

Houetiara is a village in the Tiéfora Department of Comoé Province in south-western Burkina Faso.

Population
| Year | Pop. | ±% |
|---|---|---|
| 1985 | 672 | — |
| 2006 | 145 | −78.4% |
| 2019 | 1,823 | +1157.2% |
