= Fandiora =

Fandiora Fandjora
- Interactive map of Fandiora
- Coordinates: 10°46′04″N 4°34′55″W
- Country: Burkina Faso
- Region: Cascades Region
- Province: Comoé Province
- Department: Tiéfora Department

Population (2019)
  - Total: 4,307

Fandiora is a town in the Tiéfora Department of Comoé Province in south-western Burkina Faso.

Population
Year	Pop.	±%
1985	1,271	—
2005 (est.)	1,329	+4.6%
2019	4,307	+224.1%
