= Ziedougou =

- Location in Burkina Faso
- Coordinates: 10°24′46″N 5°02′20″W
- Country: Burkina Faso
- Region: Cascades Region
- Province: Comoé Province
- Department: Soubakaniédougou Department

Population (2019)
  - Total: 2,144

Ziedougou is a town in the Soubakaniédougou Department of Comoé Province in south-western Burkina Faso.

Population
Year	Pop.	±%
1985	1,116	—
2006	1,745	+56.4%
2019	2,144	+22.9%
