= Bounouba =

- Interactive map of Bounouba
- Coordinates: 10°16′27″N 4°23′05″W
- Country: Burkina Faso
- Region: Cascades Region
- Province: Comoé Province
- Department: Mangodara Department

Population (2019)
  - Total: 1,405

Bounouba is a town in the Mangodara Department of Comoé Province in south-western Burkina Faso.

Population
Year	Pop.	±%
2006	1,288	—
2019	1,405	+9.1%
