= Bondokoro-Dogosse =

Bondokoro-Dogosse Bandakoro-Dogosse
- Interactive map of Bondokoro-Dogosse
- Coordinates: 9°54′07″N 4°26′25″W
- Country: Burkina Faso
- Region: Cascades Region
- Province: Comoé Province
- Department: Mangodara Department

Population (2019)
  - Total: 1,638

Bondokoro-Dogosse is a town in the Mangodara Department of Comoé Province in south-western Burkina Faso.

Population
Year	Pop.	±%
1985	641	—
2006	1,311	+104.5%
2019	1,638	+24.9%
