= Sakedougou =

Sakedougou Sekedougou
- Interactive map of Sakedougou
- Coordinates: 9°47′19″N 4°25′44″W
- Country: Burkina Faso
- Region: Cascades Region
- Province: Comoé Province
- Department: Mangodara Department

Population (2019)
  - Total: 412

Sakedougou is a village in the Mangodara Department of Comoé Province in south-western Burkina Faso.

Population
Year	Pop.	±%
1985	28	—
2006	197	+603.6%
2019	412	+109.1%
