= Beguele =

Beguele Geguele
- Location in Burkina Faso
- Coordinates: 10°35′55″N 3°44′27″W
- Country: Burkina Faso
- Region: Cascades Region
- Province: Comoé Province
- Department: Ouo Department

Population (2019)
  - Total: 1,408

Beguele is a village in the Ouo Department of Comoé Province in south-western Burkina Faso.

Population
Year	Pop.	±%
1985	24	—
2006	626	+2508.3%
2019	1,408	+124.9%
