= Naniagara =

Naniagara Naniangara
- Location in Burkina Faso
- Coordinates: 10°33′00″N 4°41′23″W
- Country: Burkina Faso
- Region: Cascades Region
- Province: Comoé Province
- Department: Tiéfora Department

Population (2019)
  - Total: 2,509

Naniagara is a town in the Tiéfora Department of Comoé Province in south-western Burkina Faso.

Population
Year	Pop.	±%
1985	1,864	—
2006	1,656	−11.2%
2019	2,509	+51.5%
