= Niambrigo =

Niambrigo Niambrigbo
- Interactive map of Niambrigo
- Coordinates: 9°56′22″N 4°18′12″W
- Country: Burkina Faso
- Region: Cascades Region
- Province: Comoé Province
- Department: Mangodara Department

Population (2019)
  - Total: 1,590

Niambrigo is a village in the Mangodara Department of Comoé Province in south-western Burkina Faso.

Population
Year	Pop.	±%
1985	251	—
2006	1,206	+380.5%
2019	1,590	+31.8%
