= Poikoro =

Poikoro Poikoreo
- Location in Burkina Faso
- Coordinates: 10°09′05″N 3°57′09″W
- Country: Burkina Faso
- Region: Cascades Region
- Province: Comoé Province
- Department: Ouo Department

Population (2019)
  - Total: 3,130

Poikoro is a village in the Ouo Department of Comoé Province in south-western Burkina Faso.

Population
Year	Pop.	±%
1985	237	—
2006	1,084	+357.4%
2019	3,130	+188.7%
