= Diomanidougou =

- Interactive map of Diomanidougou
- Coordinates: 9°48′58″N 4°23′32″W
- Country: Burkina Faso
- Region: Cascades Region
- Province: Comoé Province
- Department: Mangodara Department

Population (2019)
  - Total: 340

Diomanidougou is a village in the Mangodara Department of Comoé Province in south-western Burkina Faso.

Population
Year	Pop.	±%
2006	290	—
2019	340	+17.2%
