= Tiefindougou =

- Country: Burkina Faso
- Region: Cascades Region
- Province: Comoé Province
- Department: Sidéradougou Department

Population (2019)
  - Total: 385

Tiefindougou is a village in the Sidéradougou Department of Comoé Province in south-western Burkina Faso.

Population
Year	Pop.	±%
1985	120	—
2006	207	+72.5%
2019	385	+86.0%
