= Kolokolo =

- Location in Burkina Faso
- Coordinates: 10°47′56″N 4°51′37″W
- Country: Burkina Faso
- Region: Cascades Region
- Province: Comoé Province
- Department: Moussodougou Department

Population (2019)
  - Total: 2,502
  - Ethnicities: Turka

Kolokolo is a town in the Moussodougou Department of Comoé Province in south-western Burkina Faso.

Population
Year	Pop.	±%
1985	842	—
2006	1,621	+92.5%
2019	2,502	+54.3%
