= Koflande =

- Interactive map of Koflande
- Coordinates: 10°13′47″N 4°26′10″W
- Country: Burkina Faso
- Region: Cascades Region
- Province: Comoé Province
- Department: Mangodara Department

Population (2019)
  - Total: 2,724

Koflande is a town in the Mangodara Department of Comoé Province in south-western Burkina Faso.

Population
Year	Pop.	±%
1985	2,013	—
2006	3,357	+66.8%
2019	2,724	−18.9%
