= Nerekorosso =

- Interactive map of Nerekorosso
- Country: Burkina Faso
- Region: Cascades Region
- Province: Comoé Province
- Department: Mangodara Department

Population (2019)
  - Total: 295

Nerekorosso is a village in the Mangodara Department of Comoé Province in south-western Burkina Faso.

Population
Year	Pop.	±%
2006	281	—
2019	295	+5.0%
