= Noumousso =

- Interactive map of Noumousso
- Country: Burkina Faso
- Region: Cascades Region
- Province: Comoé Province
- Department: Sidéradougou Department

Population (2019)
  - Total: 1,576

Noumousso is a village in the Sidéradougou Department of Comoé Province in south-western Burkina Faso.

Population
| Year | Pop. | ±% |
|---|---|---|
| 2006 | 983 | — |
| 2019 | 1,576 | +60.3% |
