= Taka Ledougou-Koko =

Taka Ledougoukoko
- Interactive map of Taka Ledougoukoko
- Coordinates: 10°45′54″N 4°39′08″W
- Country: Burkina Faso
- Region: Cascades Region
- Province: Comoé Province
- Department: Bérégadougou Department

Population (2019)
  - Total: 908

Taka Ledougou-Koko is a village in the Bérégadougou Department of Comoé Province in south-western Burkina Faso.

Population
Year	Pop.	±%
1985	796	—
2006	852	+7.0%
2019	908	+6.6%
