= Kouere =

- Location within Burkina Faso, French West Africa
- Coordinates: 10.460804°N 4.004517°W
- Country: Burkina Faso
- Region: Cascades
- Province: Comoé
- Department: Sidéradougou

Population (2019)
  - Total: 7,465
- Time zone: UTC+0 (GMT)

Kouere is a town in the Sidéradougou Department of Comoé Province in southwestern Burkina Faso. It is near the city of Bobo-Dioulasso.

Population
| Year | Pop. | ±% |
|---|---|---|
| 1985 | 652 | — |
| 2006 | 2,869 | +340.0% |
| 2019 | 7,465 | +160.2% |
