= Boussanra =

Coordinates: 10°30′45″N 4°35′44″W

Boussanra Boussara
- Interactive map of Boussanra
- Country: Burkina Faso
- Region: Cascades Region
- Province: Comoé Province
- Department: Tiéfora Department

Population (2019)
  - Total: 902

Boussanra is a village in the Tiéfora Department of Comoé Province in south-western Burkina Faso.

Population
| Year | Pop. | ±% |
|---|---|---|
| 1985 | 1,382 | — |
| 2006 | 780 | −43.6% |
| 2019 | 902 | +15.6% |
