= Tomikorosso =

- Interactive map of Tomikorosso
- Coordinates: 9°53′00″N 4°21′45″W
- Country: Burkina Faso
- Region: Cascades Region
- Province: Comoé Province
- Department: Mangodara Department

Population (2019)
  - Total: 945

Tomikorosso is a village in the Mangodara Department of Comoé Province in south-western Burkina Faso.

Population
Year	Pop.	±%
1985	309	—
2006	500	+61.8%
2019	945	+89.0%
