= Mambire =

Mambire Nambire, Mamere
- Interactive map of Mambire
- Coordinates: 10°14′05″N 5°00′56″W
- Country: Burkina Faso
- Region: Cascades Region
- Province: Comoé Province
- Department: Soubakaniédougou Department

Population (2019)
  - Total: 557

Mambire is a village in the Soubakaniédougou Department of Comoé Province in south-western Burkina Faso.

Population
Year	Pop.	±%
1985	216	—
2006	710	+228.7%
2019	557	−21.5%
