= Tionouna =

Tionouna Tinouna
- Location in Burkina Faso
- Coordinates: 10°31′52″N 4°47′59″W
- Country: Burkina Faso
- Region: Cascades Region
- Province: Comoé Province
- Department: Banfora Department

Population (2019)
  - Total: 1,204

Tionouna is a village in the Banfora Department of Comoé Province in south-western Burkina Faso.

Population
Year	Pop.	±%
1985	502	—
2006	828	+64.9%
2019	1,204	+45.4%
