= Nafona =

- Location in Burkina Faso
- Coordinates: 10°14′31″N 5°00′45″W
- Country: Burkina Faso
- Region: Cascades Region
- Province: Comoé Province
- Department: Soubakaniédougou Department

Population (2019)
  - Total: 2,112

Nafona is a village in the Soubakaniédougou Department of Comoé Province in south-western Burkina Faso.

Population
Year	Pop.	±%
1985	407	—
2006	1,233	+202.9%
2019	2,112	+71.3%
