= Dagninikorosso =

Coordinates: 10°33′36″N 3°43′52″W

- Interactive map of Dagninikorosso
- Country: Burkina Faso
- Region: Cascades Region
- Province: Comoé Province
- Department: Ouo Department

Population (2019)
  - Total: 237

Dagninikorosso is a village in the Ouo Department of Comoé Province in south-western Burkina Faso.

Population
Year	Pop.	±%
1985	48	—
2006	149	+210.4%
2019	237	+59.1%
