= Letiefesse =

Letiefesse Letiefeso, Letiefesso
- Interactive map of Letiefesse
- Coordinates: 10°19′08″N 5°01′05″W
- Country: Burkina Faso
- Region: Cascades Region
- Province: Comoé Province
- Department: Soubakaniédougou Department

Population (2019)
  - Total: 1,865

Letiefesse is a town in the Soubakaniédougou Department of Comoé Province in southwestern Burkina Faso.

Population
Year	Pop.	±%
1985	1,257	—
2006	2,365	+88.1%
2019	1,865	−21.1%
