= Dougoudioulama =

- Country: Burkina Faso
- Region: Cascades Region
- Province: Comoé Province
- Department: Soubakaniédougou Department

Population (2019)
  - Total: 667

Dougoudioulama is a village in the Soubakaniédougou Department of Comoé Province in south-western Burkina Faso.

Population
Year	Pop.	±%
1985	300	—
2006	520	+73.3%
2019	667	+28.3%
