= Gnaminadougou =

Gnaminadougou Gnamanadougou, Niaminadougou
- Interactive map of Gnaminadougou
- Coordinates: 9°50′03″N 4°23′30″W
- Country: Burkina Faso
- Region: Cascades Region
- Province: Comoé Province
- Department: Mangodara Department

Population (2019)
  - Total: 273

Gnaminadougou is a village in the Mangodara Department of Comoé Province in south-western Burkina Faso.

Population
Year	Pop.	±%
1985	82	—
2006	238	+190.2%
2019	273	+14.7%
