= Linguekoro =

Linguekoro Lenguekoro
- Location in Burkina Faso
- Coordinates: 10°08′59″N 4°24′04″W
- Country: Burkina Faso
- Region: Cascades Region
- Province: Comoé Province
- Department: Mangodara Department

Population (2019)
  - Total: 1,253

Linguekoro or Lenguekoro is a town in the Mangodara Department of Comoé Province in south-western Burkina Faso.

Population
| Year | Pop. | ±% |
|---|---|---|
| 2006 | 424 | — |
| 2019 | 1,253 | +195.5% |
