= Saterna =

Coordinates: 10°25′33″N 4°34′45″W

- Interactive map of Saterna
- Country: Burkina Faso
- Region: Cascades Region
- Province: Comoé Province
- Department: Tiéfora Department

Population (2019)
  - Total: 1,770

Saterna is a village in the Tiéfora Department of Comoé Province in south-western Burkina Faso.

Population
Year	Pop.	±%
1985	356	—
2006	509	+43.0%
2019	1,770	+247.7%
