= Nekanklou =

- Interactive map of Nekanklou
- Coordinates: 10°37′44″N 4°47′30″W
- Country: Burkina Faso
- Region: Cascades Region
- Province: Comoé Province
- Department: Banfora Department

Population (2019)
  - Total: 1,138

Nekanklou is a village in the Banfora Department of Comoé Province in south-western Burkina Faso.

Population
Year	Pop.	±%
2006	1,027	—
2019	1,138	+10.8%
