= Tiebata =

- Location in Burkina Faso
- Coordinates: 9°51′12″N 4°16′06″W
- Country: Burkina Faso
- Region: Cascades Region
- Province: Comoé Province
- Department: Mangodara Department

Population (2019)
  - Total: 1,192

Tiebata is a village in the Mangodara Department of Comoé Province in south-western Burkina Faso.

Population
Year	Pop.	±%
1985	199	—
2006	1,060	+432.7%
2019	1,192	+12.5%
