= Gouindougouni =

- Location in Burkina Faso
- Coordinates: 10°32′36″N 5°02′46″W
- Country: Burkina Faso
- Region: Cascades Region
- Province: Comoé Province
- Department: Soubakaniédougou Department

Population (2019)
  - Total: 3,176

Gouindougouni is a town in the Soubakaniédougou Department of Comoé Province in south-western Burkina Faso.

Population
| Year | Pop. | ±% |
|---|---|---|
| 1985 | 909 | — |
| 2006 | 2,630 | +189.3% |
| 2019 | 3,176 | +20.8% |
