= Katierla =

Katierla Katierba
- Location in Burkina Faso
- Coordinates: 10°16′33″N 5°02′49″W
- Country: Burkina Faso
- Region: Cascades Region
- Province: Comoé Province
- Department: Soubakaniédougou Department

Population (2019)
  - Total: 954

Katierla is a village in the Soubakaniédougou Department of Comoé Province in south-western Burkina Faso.

Population
Year	Pop.	±%
1985	234	—
2006	619	+164.5%
2019	954	+54.1%
