= Diarabakoko =

- Location in Burkina Faso
- Coordinates: 10°28′11″N 4°46′45″W
- Country: Burkina Faso
- Region: Cascades Region
- Province: Comoé Province
- Department: Banfora Department

Population (2019)
  - Total: 2,524

Diarabakoko is a town in the Banfora Department of Comoé Province in south-western Burkina Faso.

Population
Year	Pop.	±%
1985	1,822	—
2006	2,105	+15.5%
2019	2,524	+19.9%
