= Labola Nambalfo =

- Interactive map of Labola Nambalfo
- Coordinates: 10°37′42″N 4°39′06″W
- Country: Burkina Faso
- Region: Cascades Region
- Province: Comoé Province
- Department: Tiéfora Department

Population (2019)
  - Total: 1,393

Labola Nambalfo is a town in the Tiéfora Department of Comoé Province in south-western Burkina Faso.

Population
Year	Pop.	±%
1985	1,075	—
2006	960	−10.7%
2019	1,393	+45.1%
