= Bini =

Bini may refer to:

== Arts and entertainment ==
- Bini (group), a Filipino girl group
- Bini the Bunny, a male Holland Lop rabbit, known on YouTube

== People ==
- Bini (surname)
- Bini people, an ethnic group in Nigeria
  - Bini language

== Other uses ==
- Bini, Burkina Faso, a village in Burkina Faso
- Bini (grape), another name for the wine grape Merlot
- Eupithecia bini, a moth in the family Geometridae
