= Karfiguela =

- Location in Burkina Faso
- Coordinates: 10°41′51″N 4°49′06″W
- Country: Burkina Faso
- Region: Cascades Region
- Province: Comoé Province
- Department: Banfora Department

Population (2019)
  - Total: 1,182

Karfiguela is a village in the Banfora Department of Comoé Province in south-western Burkina Faso.

Population
Year	Pop.	±%
1985	569	—
2006	910	+59.9%
2019	1,182	+29.9%
