= Kotou, Burkina Faso =

Kotou Kontou
- Country: Burkina Faso
- Region: Cascades Region
- Province: Comoé Province
- Department: Sidéradougou Department

Population (2019)
  - Total: 1,284

Kotou is a village in the Sidéradougou Department of Comoé Province in south-western Burkina Faso.

Population
Year	Pop.	±%
1985	611	—
2006	955	+56.3%
2019	1,284	+34.5%
