= Minse =

- Country: Burkina Faso
- Region: Cascades Region
- Province: Comoé Province
- Department: Ouo Department

Population (2019)
  - Total: 640

Minse is a village in the Ouo Department of Comoé Province in south-western Burkina Faso.

Population
| Year | Pop. | ±% |
|---|---|---|
| 2006 | 253 | — |
| 2019 | 640 | +153.0% |
