= Kangounadeni =

- Location in Burkina Faso
- Coordinates: 10°28′45″N 4°36′45″W
- Country: Burkina Faso
- Region: Cascades Region
- Province: Comoé Province
- Department: Tiéfora Department

Population (2019)
  - Total: 3,079

Kangounadeni is a town in the Tiéfora Department of Comoé Province in south-western Burkina Faso.

Population
Year	Pop.	±%
1985	1,162	—
2006	2,518	+116.7%
2019	3,079	+22.3%
