= Marebama =

- Location in Burkina Faso
- Coordinates: 10°31′15″N 4°47′52″W
- Country: Burkina Faso
- Region: Cascades Region
- Province: Comoé Province
- Department: Banfora Department

Population (2019)
  - Total: 356

Marebama is a village in the Banfora Department of Comoé Province in south-western Burkina Faso.

Population
Year	Pop.	±%
2006	296	—
2019	356	+20.3%
