= Mouroukoudougou =

- Interactive map of Mouroukoudougou
- Coordinates: 9°52′42″N 4°16′12″W
- Country: Burkina Faso
- Region: Cascades Region
- Province: Comoé Province
- Department: Mangodara Department

Population (2019)
  - Total: 825

Mouroukoudougou is a village in the Mangodara Department of Comoé Province in south-western Burkina Faso.

Population
Year	Pop.	±%
1985	661	—
2006	884	+33.7%
2019	825	−6.7%
