= Pambie-Sokoura =

Pambie-Sokoura Pambie-Soukoura
- Country: Burkina Faso
- Region: Cascades Region
- Province: Comoé Province
- Department: Ouo Department

Population (2019)
  - Total: 2,745

Pambie-Sokoura is a village in the Ouo Department of Comoé Province in south-western Burkina Faso.

Population
Year	Pop.	±%
1985	255	—
2006	690	+170.6%
2019	2,745	+297.8%
