= Diarakorosso =

Diarakorosso Dyarakorosso
- Interactive map of Diarakorosso
- Coordinates: 9°54′29″N 4°11′49″W
- Country: Burkina Faso
- Region: Cascades Region
- Province: Comoé Province
- Department: Mangodara Department

Population (2019)
  - Total: 2,454

Diarakorosso is a town in the Mangodara Department of Comoé Province in south-western Burkina Faso.

Population
| Year | Pop. | ±% |
|---|---|---|
| 1985 | 355 | — |
| 2006 | 1,499 | +322.3% |
| 2019 | 2,454 | +63.7% |
