= Kangounaba =

- Interactive map of Kangounaba
- Coordinates: 10°35′10″N 4°33′53″W
- Country: Burkina Faso
- Region: Cascades Region
- Province: Comoé Province
- Department: Tiéfora Department

Population (2019)
  - Total: 1,287

Kangounaba is a town in the Tiéfora Department of Comoé Province in south-western Burkina Faso.

Population
Year	Pop.	±%
1985	1,968	—
2006	409	−79.2%
2019	1,287	+214.7%
