= Mondon, Burkina Faso =

Mondon
- Location in Burkina Faso
- Coordinates: 10°51′07″N 4°49′10″W
- Country: Burkina Faso
- Region: Cascades Region
- Province: Comoé Province
- Department: Moussodougou Department

Population (2019)
  - Total: 2,540

Mondon is a town in the Moussodougou Department of Comoé Province in south-western Burkina Faso.

Population
Year	Pop.	±%
1985	1,328	—
2006	2,063	+55.3%
2019	2,540	+23.1%
