= Tiontionmana =

- Location in Burkina Faso
- Coordinates: 10°28′51″N 4°45′44″W
- Country: Burkina Faso
- Region: Cascades Region
- Province: Comoé Province
- Department: Banfora Department

Population (2019)
  - Total: 445

Tiontionmana is a village in the Banfora Department of Comoé Province in south-western Burkina Faso.

Population
Year	Pop.	±%
2006	294	—
2019	445	+51.4%
