= Sounougou =

- Interactive map of Sounougou
- Coordinates: 10°49′48″N 4°30′53″W
- Country: Burkina Faso
- Region: Cascades Region
- Province: Comoé Province
- Department: Tiéfora Department

Population (2019)
  - Total: 3,456

Sounougou is a town in the Tiéfora Department of Comoé Province in south-western Burkina Faso.

Population
Year	Pop.	±%
2006	2,056	—
2019	3,456	+68.1%
