= Bossie =

Bossie Bassie
- Location in Burkina Faso
- Coordinates: 10°22′55″N 4°02′21″W
- Country: Burkina Faso
- Region: Cascades Region
- Province: Comoé Province
- Department: Sidéradougou Department

Population (2019)
  - Total: 2,383

Bossie is a town in the Sidéradougou Department of Comoé Province in south-western Burkina Faso.

Population
Year	Pop.	±%
1985	384	—
2006	3,181	+728.4%
2019	2,383	−25.1%
