= Labola Kassianra =

Labola Kassianra Labola Kassiama
- Interactive map of Labola Kassianra
- Coordinates: 10°39′16″N 4°37′11″W
- Country: Burkina Faso
- Region: Cascades Region
- Province: Comoé Province
- Department: Tiéfora Department

Population (2019)
  - Total: 876

Labola Kassianra is a village in the Tiéfora Department of Comoé Province in south-western Burkina Faso.

Population
Year	Pop.	±%
1985	308	—
2006	1,430	+364.3%
2019	876	−38.7%
