= Gouera =

- Location in Burkina Faso
- Coordinates: 10°23′49″N 4°52′22″W
- Country: Burkina Faso
- Region: Cascades Region
- Province: Comoé Province
- Department: Soubakaniédougou Department

Population (2019)
  - Total: 3,028

Gouera is a town in the Soubakaniédougou Department of Comoé Province in south-western Burkina Faso.

Population
Year	Pop.	±%
1985	1,180	—
2006	2,006	+70.0%
2019	3,028	+50.9%
