= Nerkedaga =

Nerkedaga Nerkedanga
- Country: Burkina Faso
- Region: Cascades Region
- Province: Comoé Province
- Department: Ouo Department

Population (2019)
  - Total: 468

Nerkedaga is a village in the Ouo Department of Comoé Province in south-western Burkina Faso.

Population
Year	Pop.	±%
1985	167	—
2006	491	+194.0%
2019	468	−4.7%
