= Biton, Burkina Faso =

Biton
- Interactive map of Biton
- Coordinates: 10°48′00″N 4°31′17″W
- Country: Burkina Faso
- Region: Cascades Region
- Province: Comoé Province
- Department: Tiéfora Department

Population (2019)
  - Total: 1,805

Biton is a town in the Tiéfora Department of Comoé Province in south-western Burkina Faso.

Population
Year	Pop.	±%
2006	1,181	—
2019	1,805	+52.8%
