= Pima, Burkina Faso =

Pima
- Country: Burkina Faso
- Region: Cascades Region
- Province: Comoé Province
- Department: Sidéradougou Department

Population (2019)
  - Total: 1,145

Pima is a village in the Sidéradougou Department of Comoé Province in south-western Burkina Faso.

Population
Year	Pop.	±%
1985	263	—
2006	1,000	+280.2%
2019	1,145	+14.5%
