= Korokora =

Korokora Korogora
- Interactive map of Korokora
- Coordinates: 10°30′31″N 4°46′30″W
- Country: Burkina Faso
- Region: Cascades Region
- Province: Comoé Province
- Department: Banfora Department

Population (2019)
  - Total: 383

Korokora is a village in the Banfora Department of Comoé Province in south-western Burkina Faso.

Population
Year	Pop.	±%
2006	274	—
2019	383	+39.8%
