= Sassamba =

- Interactive map of Sassamba
- Coordinates: 10°07′47″N 4°02′02″W
- Country: Burkina Faso
- Region: Cascades Region
- Province: Comoé Province
- Department: Ouo Department

Population (2019)
  - Total: 1,868

Sassamba is a village in the Ouo Department of Comoé Province in south-western Burkina Faso.

Population
Year	Pop.	±%
2006	1,157	—
2019	1,868	+61.5%
