= Diaradougou =

- Interactive map of Diaradougou
- Country: Burkina Faso
- Region: Cascades Region
- Province: Comoé Province
- Department: Mangodara Department

Population (2019)
  - Total: 1,152

Diaradougou is a town in south-western Burkina Faso. The town, is located in the Mangodara Department of Comoé Province.

Population
Year	Pop.	±%
2006	914	—
2019	1,152	+26.0%
