= Fougangoue =

- Interactive map of Fougangoue
- Coordinates: 10°35′31″N 3°51′33″W
- Country: Burkina Faso
- Region: Cascades Region
- Province: Comoé Province
- Department: Sidéradougou Department

Population (2019)
  - Total: 850

Fougangoue is a village in the Sidéradougou Department of Comoé Province in south-western Burkina Faso.

Population
Year	Pop.	±%
1985	132	—
2006	678	+413.6%
2019	850	+25.4%
