= Niarebama =

- Location in Burkina Faso
- Coordinates: 10°27′42″N 4°44′20″W
- Country: Burkina Faso
- Region: Cascades Region
- Province: Comoé Province
- Department: Banfora Department

Population (2019)
  - Total: 358

Niarebama is a village in the Banfora Department of Comoé Province in south-western Burkina Faso.

Population
Year	Pop.	±%
2006	296	—
2019	358	+20.9%
