= Tangora =

Tangora Tangoura
- Location in Burkina Faso
- Coordinates: 10°34′49″N 4°43′49″W
- Country: Burkina Faso
- Region: Cascades Region
- Province: Comoé Province
- Department: Banfora Department

Population (2019)
  - Total: 3,266

Tangora is a town in the Banfora Department of Comoé Province in south-western Burkina Faso.

Population
Year	Pop.	±%
1985	1,644	—
2006	2,811	+71.0%
2019	3,266	+16.2%
