= Sampobien =

Sampobien Sampobin
- Country: Burkina Faso
- Region: Cascades Region
- Province: Comoé Province
- Department: Sidéradougou Department

Population (2019)
  - Total: 7,245

Sampobien is a town in the Sidéradougou Department of Comoé Province in south-western Burkina Faso.

Population
Year	Pop.	±%
1985	263	—
2006	3,112	+1083.3%
2019	7,245	+132.8%
