= Balgogo =

- Interactive map of Balgogo
- Coordinates: 10°10′52″N 4°02′17″W
- Country: Burkina Faso
- Region: Cascades Region
- Province: Comoé Province
- Department: Ouo Department

Population (2019)
  - Total: 2,054

Balgogo is a village in the Ouo Department of Comoé Province in south-western Burkina Faso.

Population
| Year | Pop. | ±% |
|---|---|---|
| 1985 | 275 | — |
| 2006 | 1,147 | +317.1% |
| 2019 | 2,054 | +79.1% |
