= Dabokiri =

- Interactive map of Dabokiri
- Coordinates: 9°44′10″N 4°23′33″W
- Country: Burkina Faso
- Region: Cascades Region
- Province: Comoé Province
- Department: Mangodara Department

Population (2019)
  - Total: 186

Dabokiri is a village in the Mangodara Department of Comoé Province in south-western Burkina Faso.

Population
Year	Pop.	±%
2006	115	—
2019	186	+61.7%
