= Degue-Degue =

- Location in Burkina Faso
- Coordinates: 10°42′41″N 4°19′33″W
- Country: Burkina Faso
- Region: Cascades Region
- Province: Comoé Province
- Department: Sidéradougou Department

Population (2019)
  - Total: 4,344

Degue-Degue is a town in the Sidéradougou Department of Comoé Province in south-western Burkina Faso.

Population
Year	Pop.	±%
2006	2,837	—
2019	4,344	+53.1%
