= Fornofesso =

Fornofesso Faradofasso
- Interactive map of Fornofesso
- Coordinates: 10°16′39″N 4°59′56″W
- Country: Burkina Faso
- Region: Cascades Region
- Province: Comoé Province
- Department: Soubakaniédougou Department

Population (2019)
  - Total: 458

Fornofesso is a village in the Soubakaniédougou Department of Comoé Province in south-western Burkina Faso.

Population
| Year | Pop. | ±% |
|---|---|---|
| 1985 | 250 | — |
| 2006 | 563 | +125.2% |
| 2019 | 458 | −18.7% |
