= Logogniegue =

- Location in Burkina Faso
- Coordinates: 9°54′19″N 4°31′03″W
- Country: Burkina Faso
- Region: Cascades Region
- Province: Comoé Province
- Department: Mangodara Department

Population (2019)
  - Total: 2,277

Logogniegue is a town in the Mangodara Department of Comoé Province in south-western Burkina Faso.

Population
Year	Pop.	±%
1985	465	—
2006	1,131	+143.2%
2019	2,277	+101.3%
