= Libora =

Libora Liboura
- Interactive map of Libora
- Coordinates: 10°34′07″N 4°24′25″W
- Country: Burkina Faso
- Region: Cascades Region
- Province: Comoé Province
- Department: Tiéfora Department

Population (2019)
  - Total: 1,331

Libora is a village in the Tiéfora Department of Comoé Province in south-western Burkina Faso.

Population
Year	Pop.	±%
2006	1,075	—
2019	1,331	+23.8%
