= Dialakoro, Burkina Faso =

Dialakoro Diarakoro
- Location in Burkina Faso
- Coordinates: 10°34′06″N 3°51′33″W
- Country: Burkina Faso
- Region: Cascades Region
- Province: Comoé Province
- Department: Sidéradougou Department

Population (2019)
  - Total: 2,945

Dialakoro is a town in the Sidéradougou Department of Comoé Province in south-western Burkina Faso.

Population
Year	Pop.	±%
1985	1,574	—
2006	2,215	+40.7%
2019	2,945	+33.0%
