= N'golofesso =

N’golofesso
- Country: Burkina Faso
- Region: Cascades Region
- Province: Comoé Province
- Department: Ouo Department

Population (2019)
  - Total: 2,971

N’golofesso is a village in the Ouo Department of Comoé Province in south-western Burkina Faso.

Population
Year	Pop.	±%
1985	144	—
2006	1,317	+814.6%
2019	2,971	+125.6%
