= Kapongouan =

Kapongouan Kapogouan
- Country: Burkina Faso
- Region: Cascades Region
- Province: Comoé Province
- Department: Sidéradougou Department

Population (2019)
  - Total: 2,909

Kapongouan is a town in the Sidéradougou Department of Comoé Province in south-western Burkina Faso.

Population
Year	Pop.	±%
1985	598	—
2006	2,866	+379.3%
2019	2,909	+1.5%
