= Torandougou =

Torandougou Torondougou
- Location in Burkina Faso
- Coordinates: 9°51′33″N 4°24′20″W
- Country: Burkina Faso
- Region: Cascades Region
- Province: Comoé Province
- Department: Mangodara Department

Population (2019)
  - Total: 1,793

Torandougou is a town in the Mangodara Department of Comoé Province in south-western Burkina Faso.

Population
Year	Pop.	±%
1985	1,785	—
2006	2,106	+18.0%
2019	1,793	−14.9%
