= Boborola =

Boborola Boboroba
- Country: Burkina Faso
- Region: Cascades Region
- Province: Comoé Province
- Department: Sidéradougou Department

Population (2019)
  - Total: 1,367

Boborola is a town in the Sidéradougou Department of Comoé Province in south-western Burkina Faso.

Population
Year	Pop.	±%
1985	1,036	—
2006	1,019	−1.6%
2019	1,367	+34.2%
