= Bondokoro-Dioula =

Bondokoro-Dioula Bandakoro-Dioula
- Interactive map of Bondokoro-Dioula
- Coordinates: 9°51′29″N 4°25′52″W
- Country: Burkina Faso
- Region: Cascades Region
- Province: Comoé Province
- Department: Mangodara Department

Population (2019)
  - Total: 358

Bondokoro-Dioula is a village in the Mangodara Department of Comoé Province in south-western Burkina Faso.

Population
Year	Pop.	±%
1985	128	—
2006	304	+137.5%
2019	358	+17.8%
