= Bombora (disambiguation) =

Bombora is an indigenous Australian term for large waves breaking over submerged rock shelves.

Bombora may also refer to:

== Music ==
- Bombora (album), a 2022 album by Seaweed Mustache
- "Bombora", a 1963 song by the Atlantics, or their 1963 album
- "Bombora", a 1963 song by the Original Surfaris, or their 1995 album
- The Bomboras, a 1990s American instrumental surf band

== Other uses ==
- BomBora (Lagoon), a roller coaster in Farmington, Utah, US
- Bombora (vodka), an Australian brand of vodka
- Bombora, Burkina Faso, a town in Burkina Faso
- Bombora, a former Soviet military airfield near Gudauta, Abkhazia, Georgia
- Bombora: The Story of Australian Surfing, a 2009 Australian television documentary nominated for a 2010 Logie Award
- Bombora, a 1996 novel by Tegan Bennett Daylight
