= Tiéfora =

- Location in Burkina Faso
- Coordinates: 10°37′49″N 4°33′04″W
- Country: Burkina Faso
- Region: Cascades Region
- Province: Comoé Province
- Department: Tiéfora Department

Population (2019)
  - Total: 12,242

Tiéfora is the capital of the Tiéfora Department of Comoé Province in south-western Burkina Faso.

Population
Year	Pop.	±%
1985	3,713	—
2006	4,121	+11.0%
2019	12,242	+197.1%
