= Bade, Burkina Faso =

Bade
- Location in Burkina Faso
- Country: Burkina Faso
- Region: Cascades Region
- Province: Comoé Province
- Department: Sidéradougou Department

Population (2019)
  - Total: 1,613

Bade is a town in the Sidéradougou Department of Comoé Province in south-western Burkina Faso.

Population
Year	Pop.	±%
2006	1,490	—
2019	1,613	+8.3%
