= Fabedougou =

Coordinates: 10°44′41″N 4°48′07″W

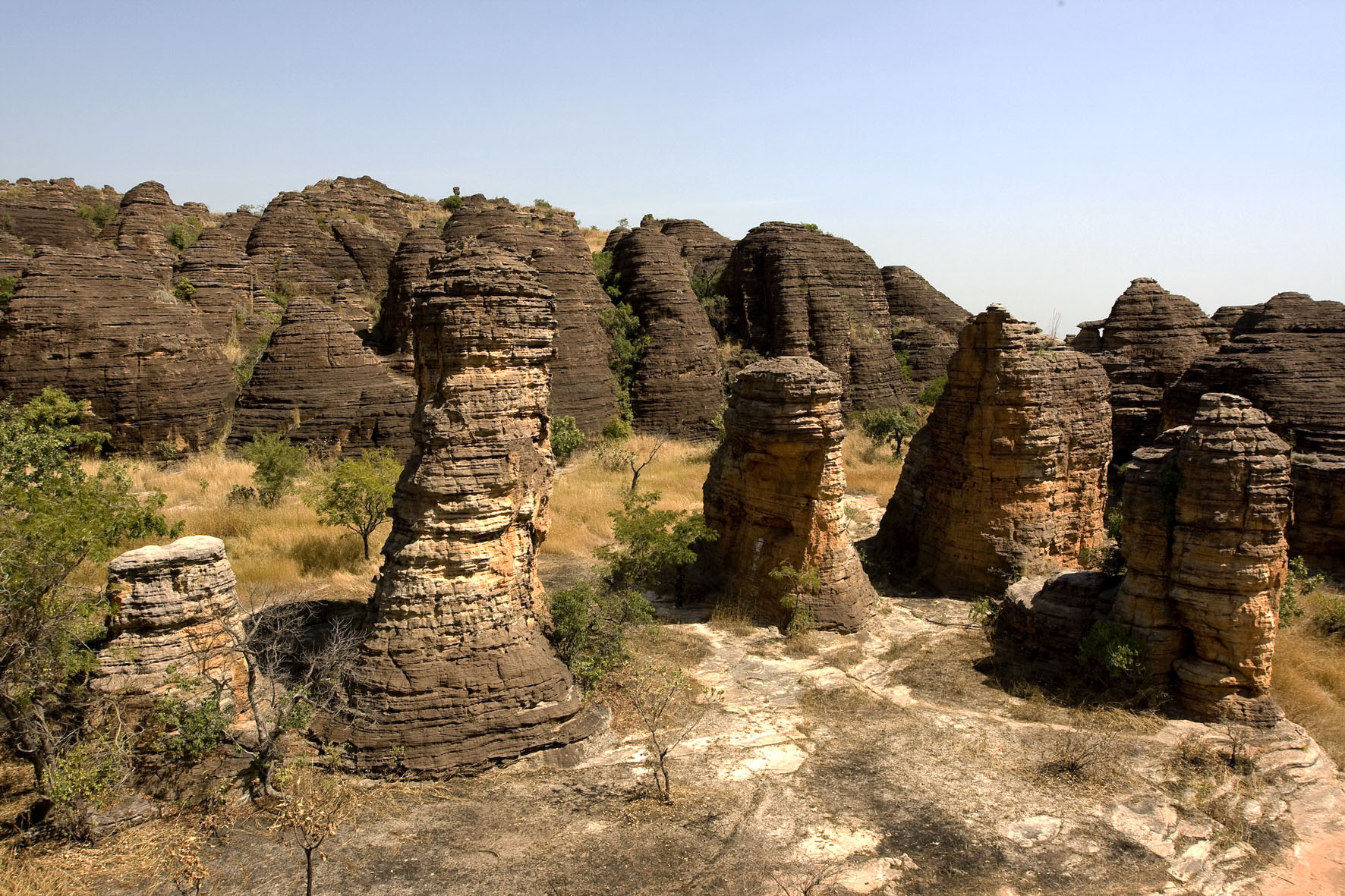
- Domes of Fabedougou
- Interactive map of Fabedougou
- Country: Burkina Faso
- Region: Cascades Region
- Province: Comoé Province
- Department: Bérégadougou Department

Population (2019)
  - Total: 875

Fabedougou is a village in the Bérégadougou Department of Comoé Province in south-western Burkina Faso.

== Domes of Fabedougou ==
The Domes of Fabedougou are natural sandstone or limestone rock formations found within the village. The stone is Proterozoic and almost 2 billion years old. The area is mostly surrounded by sugar cane fields.

Population
Year	Pop.	±%
1985	538	—
2006	4,681	+770.1%
2019	875	−81.3%
