= Kien, Burkina Faso =

Kien
- Location in Burkina Faso
- Coordinates: 10°13′27″N 3°52′11″W
- Country: Burkina Faso
- Region: Cascades Region
- Province: Comoé Province
- Department: Ouo Department

Population (2019)
  - Total: 1,190

Kien is a village in the Ouo Department of Comoé Province in south-western Burkina Faso.

Population
Year	Pop.	±%
1985	90	—
2006	260	+188.9%
2019	1,190	+357.7%
