= Sokoura, Tiéfora Department, Comoé =

Sokoura
- Interactive map of Sokoura
- Coordinates: 10°51′30″N 4°29′58″W
- Country: Burkina Faso
- Region: Cascades Region
- Province: Comoé Province
- Department: Tiéfora Department

Population (2019)
  - Total: 1,031

Sokoura is a village in the Tiéfora Department of Comoé Province in south-western Burkina Faso.

Population
Year	Pop.	±%
2006	2,372	—
2019	1,031	−56.5%
