= Sirakoro, Ouo =

Sirakoro
- Location in Burkina Faso
- Coordinates: 10°07′46″N 4°08′38″W
- Country: Burkina Faso
- Region: Cascades Region
- Province: Comoé Province
- Department: Ouo Department

Population (2019)
  - Total: 1,047

Sirakoro is a village in the Ouo Department of Comoé Province in south-western Burkina Faso.

Population
Year	Pop.	±%
1985	196	—
2006	1,115	+468.9%
2019	1,047	−6.1%
