= Boulo =

Boulo may refer to:

- Boulo, Burkina Faso, a town in Tiéfora Department
- Boulo, Central African Republic, a village in Ouham Prefecture.
