= Bombora, Burkina Faso =

Bombora
- Interactive map of Bombora
- Coordinates: 10°29′27″N 4°49′13″W
- Country: Burkina Faso
- Region: Cascades Region
- Province: Comoé Province
- Department: Banfora Department

Population (2019)
  - Total: 1,662

Bombora is a town in the Banfora Department of Comoé Province in south-western Burkina Faso.

Population
Year	Pop.	±%
2006	1,137	—
2019	1,662	+46.2%
