= Badara =

Badara may refer to:

- Badara (name)
- Badara, Burkina Faso, a village
- Badara, Nagorno-Karabakh, a village
- Badaratittha or Badara Tittha Vihara, a historic Theravada Buddhist vihara in Tamil Nadu, India
