= Soubakaniédougou =

- Location in Burkina Faso
- Coordinates: 10°28′N 5°1′W
- Country: Burkina Faso
- Region: Cascades Region
- Province: Comoé Province
- Department: Soubakaniédougou Department

Population (2019)
  - Total: 13,881

Soubakaniédougou is a town in southwestern Burkina Faso. By road, it is about 40 km south-west of the town of Banfora, and about 125 km south-west of the city of Bobo-Dioulasso. It is the capital of Soubakaniédougou Department.

Population
Year	Pop.	±%
1985	5,634	—
2006	9,451	+67.7%
2019	13,881	+46.9%
