= Safia, Burkina Faso =

Coordinates: 10°42′26″N 3°44′58″W

Safia
- Interactive map of Safia
- Country: Burkina Faso
- Region: Cascades Region
- Province: Comoé Province
- Department: Ouo Department

Population (2019)
  - Total: 2,503

Safia is a town in the Ouo Department of Comoé Province in south-western Burkina Faso.

Population
| Year | Pop. | ±% |
|---|---|---|
| 1985 | 52 | — |
| 2006 | 1,348 | +2492.3% |
| 2019 | 2,503 | +85.7% |
