= Badara, Burkina Faso =

Badara
- Location in Burkina Faso
- Coordinates: 10°27′34″N 5°05′19″W
- Country: Burkina Faso
- Region: Cascades Region
- Province: Comoé Province
- Department: Soubakaniédougou Department

Population (2019)
  - Total: 585

Badara is a village in the Soubakaniédougou Department of Comoé Province in south-western Burkina Faso.

Population
Year	Pop.	±%
1985	299	—
2006	354	+18.4%
2019	585	+65.3%
