= K'poum =

- Country: Burkina Faso
- Region: Cascades Region
- Province: Comoé Province
- Department: Ouo Department

Population (2019)
  - Total: 717

K'poum is a village in the Ouo Department of Comoé Province in south-western Burkina Faso.

Population
| Year | Pop. | ±% |
|---|---|---|
| 1985 | 544 | — |
| 2006 | 409 | −24.8% |
| 2019 | 717 | +75.3% |
