= Mangodara =

- Location in Burkina Faso
- Coordinates: 9°54′09″N 4°21′27″W
- Country: Burkina Faso
- Region: Cascades Region
- Province: Comoé Province
- Department: Mangodara Department

Population (2019)
  - Total: 9,126

Mangodara is the capital of the Mangodara Department of Comoé Province in south-western Burkina Faso.

Population
Year	Pop.	±%
1985	1,800	—
2006	5,915	+228.6%
2019	9,126	+54.3%
