= Dandougou, Sidéradougou =

Town in Burkina Faso

Dandougou
- Location in Burkina Faso
- Coordinates: 10°31′52″N 4°04′17″W
- Country: Burkina Faso
- Region: Cascades Region
- Province: Comoé Province
- Department: Sidéradougou Department

Population (2019)
  - Total: 4,098

Dandougou is a town in the Sidéradougou Department of Comoé Province in south-western Burkina Faso.

Population
| Year | Pop. | ±% |
|---|---|---|
| 1985 | 350 | — |
| 2006 | 3,352 | +857.7% |
| 2019 | 4,098 | +22.3% |
