= Sidéradougou =

- Location within Burkina Faso, West Africa
- Coordinates: 10°40′33″N 4°15′11″W
- Country: Burkina Faso
- Region: Cascades Region
- Province: Comoé Province
- Department: Sidéradougou Department

Population (2019)
  - Total: 12,120
- Time zone: UTC+0 (GMT)

Sidéradougou is a town in southwestern Burkina Faso. It is near the city of Bobo-Dioulasso. Sidéradougou is the capital of Sidéradougou Department.

Population
Year	Pop.	±%
1985	1,925	—
2006	6,191	+221.6%
2019	12,120	+95.8%
