= Mado, Burkina Faso =

Mado
- Location in Burkina Faso
- Coordinates: 10°05′00″N 4°03′56″W
- Country: Burkina Faso
- Region: Cascades Region
- Province: Comoé Province
- Department: Ouo Department

Population (2019)
  - Total: 451

Mado is a village in the Ouo Department of Comoé Province, south-western Burkina Faso.

Population
| Year | Pop. | ±% |
|---|---|---|
| 1985 | 32 | — |
| 2006 | 299 | +834.4% |
| 2019 | 451 | +50.8% |
