= Sirakoro =

Sirakoro may refer to one of the following settlements in Africa:

- Sirakoro, Mangodara, Burkina Faso
- Sirakoro, Ouo, Burkina Faso
- Sirakoro, Mali
