= Bini, Burkina Faso =

Bini
- Location in Burkina Faso
- Coordinates: 10°33′17″N 3°44′37″W
- Country: Burkina Faso
- Region: Cascades Region
- Province: Comoé Province
- Department: Ouo Department

Population (2019)
  - Total: 935

Bini is a village in the Ouo Department of Comoé Province in south-western Burkina Faso.

Population
Year	Pop.	±%
2006	428	—
2019	935	+118.5%
