= Soucie (disambiguation) =

Soucie is a village in Burkina Faso. Soucie may also refer to:

- Soucie (surname)
- Sans Soucie, a compilation of non-album tracks by the American dream pop band Halou
