= Soucie =

- Location in Burkina Faso
- Coordinates: 10°21′24″N 3°54′04″W
- Country: Burkina Faso
- Region: Cascades Region
- Province: Comoé Province
- Department: Ouo Department

Population (2019)
  - Total: 568

Soucie is a village in the Ouo Department of Comoé Province in south-western Burkina Faso.

Population
Year	Pop.	±%
1985	530	—
2006	1,298	+144.9%
2019	568	−56.2%
