= Dandougou, Mangodara =

Dandougou
- Location in Burkina Faso
- Coordinates: 10°05′45″N 4°20′16″W
- Country: Burkina Faso
- Region: Cascades Region
- Province: Comoé Province
- Department: Mangodara Department

Population (2019)
  - Total: 3,655

Dandougou is a town in the Mangodara Department of Comoé Province in south-western Burkina Faso.

Population
Year	Pop.	±%
1985	495	—
2006	1,708	+245.1%
2019	3,655	+114.0%
