= Bérégadougou =

- Location in Burkina Faso
- Coordinates: 10°46′07″N 4°44′06″W
- Country: Burkina Faso
- Region: Cascades Region
- Province: Comoé Province
- Department: Bérégadougou Department

Population (2019)
  - Total: 12,212

Bérégadougou is the capital of the Bérégadougou Department of Comoé Province in south-western Burkina Faso.

Population
Year	Pop.	±%
1985	3,675	—
2006	5,404	+47.0%
2019	12,212	+126.0%

== See also ==
- Beregadougou Classified Forest
