= Sokoura I, Mangodara Department, Comoé =

Sokoura
- Interactive map of Sokoura
- Coordinates: 10°00′05″N 4°20′47″W
- Country: Burkina Faso
- Region: Cascades Region
- Province: Comoé Province
- Department: Mangodara Department

Population (2019)
  - Total: 2,253

Sokoura is a village in the Mangodara Department of Comoé Province in south-western Burkina Faso. There is another village called Sokoura in Mangodara Department; the two are distinguished in government documentation by Roman numerals after their names.

Population
Year	Pop.	±%
2006	1,246	—
2019	2,253	+80.8%
