= Kadio, Burkina Faso =

Kadio
- Location in Burkina Faso
- Coordinates: 10°21′29″N 4°14′28″W
- Country: Burkina Faso
- Region: Cascades Region
- Province: Comoé Province
- Department: Sidéradougou Department

Population (2019)
  - Total: 2,339

Kadio is a town in the Sidéradougou Department of Comoé Province in south-western Burkina Faso.

Population
Year	Pop.	±%
2006	1,736	—
2019	2,339	+34.7%
