= Bade =

Bade may refer to:

== People ==
- Bade (surname)

== Places ==
- Bade, Burkina Faso, a town in Comoé Province
- Bade, Nigeria, a Local Government Area in Yobe State
- Bade District, a district in Taoyuan, Taiwan
- Bade Emirate, a traditional state in Nigeria

== Other uses ==
- Bade languages, a family of three languages in Nigeria
  - Bade language, the language for which the group is named
- Badé, the Crow word for third-gender people such as Osh-Tisch
- Bade, a funeral tower used in the Balinese Ngaben cremation ceremony
- Mu Leporis, a star also named Bade
