= Sirakoro, Mangodara =

Sirakoro
- Location in Burkina Faso
- Coordinates: 9°47′28″N 4°22′56″W
- Country: Burkina Faso
- Region: Cascades Region
- Province: Comoé Province
- Department: Mangodara Department

Population (2019)
  - Total: 938

Sirakoro is a village in the Mangodara Department of Comoé Province in south-western Burkina Faso.

Population
Year	Pop.	±%
1985	613	—
2006	797	+30.0%
2019	938	+17.7%
