= Dandougou =

Dandougou may refer to:

== Burkina Faso ==
- Dandougou, Mangodara
- Dandougou, Sidéradougou

== Ivory Coast ==
- Dandougou, Ivory Coast

== Mali ==
- Dandougou, Mali
