= Moussodougou =

- Location in Burkina Faso
- Coordinates: 10°49′55″N 4°56′12″W
- Country: Burkina Faso
- Region: Cascades Region
- Province: Comoé Province
- Department: Moussodougou Department

Population (2019)
  - Total: 10,903

Moussodougou is the capital of the Moussodougou Department of Comoé Province in south-western Burkina Faso.

Population
Year	Pop.	±%
1985	5,835	—
2006	5,740	−1.6%
2019	10,903	+89.9%
