= Boulo, Burkina Faso =

Boulo
- Interactive map of Boulo
- Coordinates: 10°21′48″N 4°32′36″W
- Country: Burkina Faso
- Region: Cascades Region
- Province: Comoé Province
- Department: Tiéfora Department

Population (2019)
  - Total: 5,233

Boulo is a town in the Tiéfora Department of Comoé Province in south-western Burkina Faso.

Population
Year	Pop.	±%
2006	2,098	—
2019	5,233	+149.4%
