= Ouo =

- Location in Burkina Faso
- Coordinates: 10°24′00″N 3°50′45″W
- Country: Burkina Faso
- Region: Cascades Region
- Province: Comoé Province
- Department: Ouo Department

Population (2019)
  - Total: 5,411

Ouo (French pronunciation: [wo]) is the capital of the Ouo Department of Comoé Province in south-western Burkina Faso.

Population
Year	Pop.	±%
1985	696	—
2006	2,292	+229.3%
2019	5,411	+136.1%
