= Tengrela, Burkina Faso =

Tengrela
- Location in Burkina Faso
- Coordinates: 10°39′08″N 4°49′28″W
- Country: Burkina Faso
- Region: Cascades Region
- Province: Comoé Province
- Department: Banfora Department

Population (2019)
  - Total: 5,752

Tengrela is a town in the Banfora Department of Comoé Province in south-western Burkina Faso.

Population
Year	Pop.	±%
1985	2,737	—
2006	3,727	+36.2%
2019	5,752	+54.3%
