= Tengrela =

Tengrela may refer to:

- Tengréla, a town in Ivory Coast
- Tengréla Department, a department of Ivory Coast
- Lake Tengrela, a lake in Ouagadougou, Burkina Faso
- Tengrela, Burkina Faso, a town in Burkina Faso
