= Safia =

Safia may refer to:

== People ==
- Safia (given name)

== Places ==
- Safia, Burkina Faso
- Safia, Yemen
- Safia Rural LLG, Papua New Guinea

== Biology ==
- Safia (moth), a genus of moth

== Music ==
- Safia (band), an Australian indie electronica band, best known for featuring on the 2014 Peking Duk song "Take Me Over"

== See also ==
- Sofia (disambiguation)
