= Mado =

Mado may refer to:

== Biology ==
- Mado (fish) (in New Zealand), Atypichthys latus, a species of perciform fish

== Geography ==
- Mado, Burkina Faso, a village in south-western Burkina Faso
- Mado Gashi (also Modogashe), a small remote town in the Eastern Province of Kenya
- Mado (마도 馬島), an island in Hadong County, South Gyeongsang Province, South Korea
- Mado, Hwaseong, a township in Gyeonggi Province, South Korea

== Organizations ==
- Mado (restaurateur), abbreviation of "Maraş Dondurması", a Turkish café and restaurant chain, famous for its unique ice cream
- Mado (manufacturer), a.k.a. Oje Parvaz Mado Nafar, an Iranian company that specializes in aircraft propulsion systems

== People ==
- Mado Lamotte, stage name of Luc Provost, a Montréal drag queen
- Mado Robin, (1918–1960), a French Soprano
- Michio Mado (1909–2014), a Japanese poet

== Various media ==
- Mado (film), a French-Italian film by Claude Sautet, premiered in 1976
- Orpheus no Mado, a manga by Riyoko Ikeda
- Mado is also the Creek and Seminole word for "thank you"
