= Poum (disambiguation) =

Poum is a commune in the North Province of New Caledonia.

Poum or POUM may also refer to:

- POUM (Partido Obrero de Unificación Marxista), the Workers' Party of Marxist Unification, a Spanish Marxist party active in the Spanish Civil War
- Poum, Struga, a village in North Macedonia
- Poum Lake, a lake in Vancouver Island
- AS Poum, a football team in New Caledonia

== See also ==
- K'poum, a village in the Ouo Department, Comoé Province, Burkina Faso
