= Banfora Department =

Banfora
- Department
- Legend: Capital; Villages
- Country: Burkina Faso
- Province: Comoé Province

Area
  - Department: 361 sq mi (935 km^{2})

Population (2019 census)
  - Department: 160,282
  - Density: 444/sq mi (171/km^{2})
  - Urban: 117,452
- Time zone: UTC+0 (GMT 0)

Banfora is a department or commune of Comoé Province in southern Burkina Faso. Its capital is the town of Banfora. According to the 2019 census the department has a total population of 160,282.

Banfora commune, in the Cascades Region of Burkina Faso comprises 22 villages and 15 urban sectors. Economic activities include agriculture, livestock husbandry, and industries such as mining, which all require reliable access to water. Surveys conducted in 2017 indicated that only 69% of the population in Banfora had access to basic water services, while 28% had access to basic sanitation services. In the case of water services, the majority of households use boreholes with hand-operated pumps.

== Towns and villages ==
Place	Population (2019)	Location
Banfora	117452	10°37′51″N 4°45′32″W
Bodadiougou	2202	10°43′34″N 4°54′06″W
Bombora	1662	10°29′27″N 4°49′13″W
Diarabakoko	2524	10°28′11″N 4°46′45″W
Diongolo	2694	10°33′59″N 4°52′10″W
Dionouna	2130	10°28′56″N 4°48′57″W
Karfiguela	1182	10°41′51″N 4°49′06″W
Kitobama	233	10°30′31″N 4°47′03″W
Korokora	383	10°30′31″N 4°46′30″W
Lemouroudougou	1372	10°40′41″N 4°47′08″W
Marebama	356	10°31′15″N 4°47′52″W
Nekanklou	1138	10°37′44″N 4°47′30″W
Niankar	1936	10°33′10″N 4°48′00″W
Niarebama	358	10°27′42″N 4°44′20″W
Siniena	6216	10°32′07″N 4°46′18″W
Sitiena	2018	10°36′16″N 4°48′18″W
Tangora	3266	10°34′49″N 4°43′49″W
Tengrela	5752	10°39′08″N 4°49′28″W
Tiekouna	1171	10°37′48″N 4°48′28″W
Tiempagora	1248	10°24′44″N 4°48′01″W
Tionouna	1204	10°31′52″N 4°47′59″W
Tiontionmana	445	10°28′51″N 4°45′44″W
Toumousseni	3360	10°37′47″N 4°54′17″W
