= Kadio =

Kadio may refer to:

- Kadio, Burkina Faso
- Kadio, Togo
- Kadio Company Ltd.
