= Soubakaniédougou Department =

Soubakaniédougou
- Department
- Legend: Capital; Villages
- Country: Burkina Faso
- Province: Comoé Province

Area
  - Total: 335.2 sq mi (868.1 km^{2})

Population (2019 census)
  - Total: 37,500
  - Density: 112/sq mi (43.2/km^{2})
- Time zone: UTC+0 (GMT 0)

Soubakaniédougou is a department or commune of Comoé Province in south-western Burkina Faso. Its capital lies at the town of Soubakaniédougou. According to the 2019 census the department has a total population of 37,500.

== Towns and villages ==
Place	Population (2019)	Location
Soubakaniédougou	13881	10°28′28″N 5°00′14″W
Badara	585	10°27′34″N 5°05′19″W
Damana	1788	10°21′52″N 5°03′01″W
Dougoudioulama	667	
Fornofesso	458	10°16′39″N 4°59′56″W
Gouera	3028	10°23′49″N 4°52′22″W
Gouindougouba	2527	10°32′42″N 5°05′16″W
Gouindougouni	3176	10°32′36″N 5°02′46″W
Katierla	954	10°16′33″N 5°02′49″W
Letiefesse	1865	10°19′08″N 5°01′05″W
Mambire	557	10°14′05″N 5°00′56″W
Nafona	2112	10°14′31″N 5°00′45″W
Panga	3758	10°22′00″N 4°58′00″W
Ziedougou	2144	10°24′46″N 5°02′20″W
