= Moussodougou Department =

Moussodougou
- Department
- Legend: Capital; Villages
- Country: Burkina Faso
- Province: Comoé Province

Area
  - Total: 115.3 sq mi (298.5 km^{2})

Population (2019 census)
  - Total: 17,288
  - Density: 150.0/sq mi (57.92/km^{2})
- Time zone: UTC+0 (GMT 0)
- Website: https://moussodougou.org/

Moussodougou is a department or commune of Comoé Province in southern Burkina Faso. Its capital is the town of Moussodougou. According to the 2019 census, the department has a total population of 17,288.

== Towns and villages ==
Place	Population (2019)	Location
Moussodougou	10,903	10°49′55″N 4°56′12″W
Diamon	1,343	10°48′23″N 5°02′45″W
Kolokolo	2,502	10°47′56″N 4°51′37″W
Mondon	2,540	10°51′07″N 4°49′10″W
