= Tiéfora Department =

Tiéfora
- Department
- Legend: Capital; Villages
- Country: Burkina Faso
- Province: Comoé Province

Area
  - Total: 419 sq mi (1,086 km^{2})

Population (2019 census)
  - Total: 75,423
  - Density: 179.9/sq mi (69.45/km^{2})
- Time zone: UTC+0 (GMT 0)

Tiéfora is a department or commune of Comoé Province in south-western Burkina Faso. Its capital lies at the town of Tiéfora. According to the 2019 census the department has a total population of 75,423.

== Towns and villages ==
| Place | Population (2019) | Location |
|---|---|---|
| Tiéfora | 12242 | 10°37′49″N 4°33′04″W |
| Bamako | 2922 | 10°32′56″N 4°26′51″W |
| Biton | 1805 | 10°48′00″N 4°31′17″W |
| Bondorola | 1167 | 10°32′50″N 4°34′47″W |
| Boulo | 5233 | 10°21′48″N 4°32′36″W |
| Boussanra I | 902 | 10°30′45″N 4°35′44″W |
| Boussanra II | 7833 | |
| Djandoro | 2601 | 10°33′14″N 4°25′37″W |
| Dramandougou | 1831 | 10°50′06″N 4°31′59″W |
| Fandiora | 4307 | 10°46′04″N 4°34′55″W |
| Houetiara | 1823 | 10°28′24″N 4°41′40″W |
| Kangounaba | 1287 | 10°35′10″N 4°33′53″W |
| Kangounadeni | 3079 | 10°28′45″N 4°36′45″W |
| Labola Foukara | 532 | 10°38′26″N 4°36′49″W |
| Labola Kassianra | 876 | 10°39′16″N 4°37′11″W |
| Labola Koumoussanra | 877 | 10°35′56″N 4°36′37″W |
| Labola Nambalfo | 1393 | 10°37′42″N 4°39′06″W |
| Labola Sankrala | 1231 | 10°39′26″N 4°39′56″W |
| Libora | 1331 | 10°34′07″N 4°24′25″W |
| Loubora | 547 | 10°30′11″N 4°34′21″W |
| Moussoumourou | 1441 | 10°36′25″N 4°26′36″W |
| Nadrifa | 253 | 10°48′31″N 4°25′02″W |
| Naniagara | 2509 | 10°33′00″N 4°41′23″W |
| Sakora | 5525 | 10°24′28″N 4°37′30″W |
| Sankara | 2032 | 10°25′27″N 4°37′01″W |
| Sangora | 2430 | |
| Saterna | 1770 | 10°25′33″N 4°34′45″W |
| Sikane | 1157 | 10°33′24″N 4°22′41″W |
| Sokoura | 1031 | 10°51′30″N 4°29′58″W |
| Sounougou | 3456 | 10°49′48″N 4°30′53″W |
