= Bérégadougou Department =

Bérégadougou
- Department
- Legend: Capital; Villages
- Country: Burkina Faso
- Province: Comoé Province

Area
  - Total: 110.6 sq mi (286.5 km^{2})

Population (2019 census)
  - Total: 15,164
  - Density: 137.1/sq mi (52.93/km^{2})
- Time zone: UTC+0 (GMT 0)

Bérégadougou is a department or commune of Comoé Province in southern Burkina Faso. Its capital lies at the town of Bérégadougou. According to the 2019 census the department has a total population of 15,164.

== Towns and villages ==
Place	Population (2019)	Location
Bérégadougo	12212	10°46′07″N 4°44′06″W
Fabedougou	875	10°44′41″N 4°48′07″W
Malon	192	10°44′13″N 4°46′57″W
Serefedougou	977	10°43′51″N 4°41′06″W
Taka Ledougoukoko	908	10°45′54″N 4°39′08″W
