= Badara (name) =

Badara or Bădără may refer to:

== Given name ==
- Badara Badji (born 1994), Senegalese footballer
- Badara Diatta (born 1969), Senegalese football referee
- Badara Joof, Gambian politician and civil servant
- Badara Ndiaye (born 1986), Senegalese visual concept developer and fashion designer
- Badara Sarr (born 1994), Senegalese footballer
- Badara Sène (footballer) (born 1984), Senegalese footballer
- Badara Traore (born 1997), American football player

== Surname ==
- Gheorghe Bădără (born 1941), Romanian cyclist
