= Ouo Department =

Ouo
- Department
- Legend: Capital; Villages
- Country: Burkina Faso
- Province: Comoé Province

Area
  - Total: 1,047 sq mi (2,712 km^{2})

Population (2019 census)
  - Total: 45,170
  - Density: 43.14/sq mi (16.66/km^{2})
- Time zone: UTC+0 (GMT 0)

Ouo is a department or commune of Comoé Province in southern Burkina Faso. Its capital lies at the town of Ouo. According to the 1996 census the department has a total population of 45,170.

== Towns and villages ==
Place	Population (2019)	Location
Ouo	5411	10°24′00″N 3°50′45″W
Balgogo	2054	10°10′52″N 4°02′17″W
Beguele	1408	10°35′55″N 3°44′27″W
Bini	935	10°33′17″N 3°44′37″W
Dagninikorosso	237	10°33′36″N 3°43′52″W
Dapala	1424	10°27′37″N 3°45′34″W
Gangasse	2310	10°31′06″N 3°48′19″W
Gonga	215	
Guedanga	1435	
Inzele	616	
K’poum	717	
Kien	1190	10°13′27″N 3°52′11″W
Konamisse	2524	10°18′02″N 3°57′34″W
Logue	3639	10°17′02″N 3°51′39″W
Mado	451	10°05′00″N 4°03′56″W
Minse	640	
N’golofesso	2971	
Nerkedaga	468	
Norkama	1624	10°41′17″N 3°43′42″W
Pambie-Sokoura	2745	
Poikoro	3130	10°09′05″N 3°57′09″W
Safia	2503	10°42′26″N 3°44′58″W
Sassamba	1868	10°07′47″N 4°02′02″W
Siekoro	1538	
Sirakoro	1047	10°07′46″N 4°08′38″W
Sokourani	566	
Soucie	568	10°21′24″N 3°54′04″W
Toukoro	936	10°24′18″N 3°51′41″W
