= Sidéradougou Department =

Sidéradougou
- Department
- Legend: Capital; Villages
- Country: Burkina Faso
- Province: Comoé Province

Area
  - Total: 1,495 sq mi (3,873 km^{2})

Population (2019 census)
  - Total: 137,675
  - Density: 92.07/sq mi (35.55/km^{2})
- Time zone: UTC+0 (GMT 0)

Sidéradougou is a department or commune of Comoé Province in southern Burkina Faso. Its capital is the town of Sidéradougou. According to the 2019 census the department has a total population of 137,675.

== Towns and villages ==
Place	Population (2019)	Location
Sidéradougou	12120	10°40′33″N 4°15′11″W
Bade	1613	10°27′18″N 4°06′06″W
Banagoubou	1448	
Banakoro	3104	10°25′52″N 4°16′48″W
Bate	2261	
Boborola	1367	
Bogote	2737	10°25′34″N 4°00′40″W
Bossie	2383	10°22′55″N 4°02′21″W
Dalambe I	1363	
Dalamba II	694	
Dandougou	4098	10°31′52″N 4°04′17″W
Degue-Degue	4344	10°42′41″N 4°19′33″W
Deregoue I	13305	10°45′08″N 4°05′07″W
Deregoue II	2046	
Dialakoro	2945	10°34′06″N 3°51′33″W
Dierisso	899	10°34′17″N 4°18′28″W
Djanga	1238	
Djassa	511	
Dogoma	2018	
Donfara	742	
Doutie	3525	10°11′50″N 4°08′07″W
Faradjan	6042	10°22′17″N 4°11′57″W
Fougangoue	850	10°35′31″N 3°51′33″W
Gouandougou	6080	
Gouin-Gouin	1831	10°41′44″N 4°13′01″W
Kadio	2339	10°21′29″N 4°14′28″W
Kapongouan	2909	
Kassande	2809	10°31′50″N 4°17′09″W
Kogoue	1064	
Kokanko	2104	
Konkan	1054	10°39′17″N 4°07′14″W
Kotou	1284	
Kotougouni	4030	
Kouendi	9563	
Kouere	7465	10°27′46″N 3°59′48″W
Kourougoue	1063	
Manifele	922	10°23′40″N 4°04′53″W
Noumousso	1576	
Pima	1145	
Saganako	2489	10°21′18″N 4°05′36″W
Sampobien	7245	
Tanga	405	10°40′44″N 4°16′22″W
Tiefindougou	385	
Tomodjan	1085	
Woyo	1108	
Yade	2623	10°34′49″N 4°22′42″W
Zangazoli	3512	
