= Soucie (surname) =

Soucie is a surname. Notable people with the surname include:

- Kath Soucie, American actress
- Kevin Soucie (born 1954), American politician
