= Foo Wan Kien =

Foo Wan Kien (胡万乾; born 1942) is a car dealership businessman in Malaysia. He is the current executive chairman of the City Motors Group Sdn Bhd. He was born in 1942 in the Malaysian state of Perak.

== Business ==
Foo spends most of his time in Kuala Lumpur, Singapore, and Hong Kong instead of his head office in the Foo Yet Kai Building at Jalan Sultan Iskandar. Most of his plantation and aquaculture businesses are in Perak. His other business interests includes construction, property development and investment, plywood and wood products and trading.

Foo Wan Kien became one of the founder members of the Royal Perak Motor Club (RPMC), and took on race organising. 66 was the number that his star driver, Albert Poon used as the competition number for the many Alfa Romeos that were entered by Foo in the years from the 1960s to the 1970s. Foo was also the franchise holder for Alfa Romeo in the period from the 1960s to the early 1990s.
