= Kiên Thành =

Kiên Thành may refer to several places in Vietnam, including:

- Kiên Thành, Bắc Giang, a rural commune of Lục Ngạn District
- Kiên Thành, Yên Bái, a rural commune of Trấn Yên District

== See also ==
- Kiến Thành (disambiguation)
