= Badara Ndiaye =

Senegalese Visual Concept & Creative Director, visual artist, journalist and model

- Born: 31 March 1986 (age 40); Kaolack, Senegal
- Education: Florida International University (FIU)
- Organization(s): Badaraofficial; BSMLifestyle
- Known for: Men's fashion and conceptual visual arts
- Basketball career

Personal information
- Listed height: 6 ft 11 in (2.11 m)
- Listed weight: 235 lb (107 kg)

Career information
- High school: Fontiyon Tabl; Saint-Louis, Senegal
- College: Florida International University (FIU)
- Position: Center
- Number: 31

Badara Ndiaye (born 31 March 1986 in Kaolack) is a Senegalese-born American and French visual artist, journalist, fashion designer, photographer, filmmaker, model, and former NCAA Division I basketball player.

== Personal life ==
Ndiaye was born 31 March 1986 in Kaolack, Senegal. to Abdallah Ndiaye and Ndeye Ndiaye. His father is a well-known actor and a feminist. His mother is a women's rights activist. Among his siblings are two brothers. He played volleyball, football (soccer), and basketball, among other sports he enjoyed such as gymnastics. He only began playing basketball at age 17. He describes his personality while growing up as reserved, but he was a member of his school's culture club. Ndiaye was recruited to play college basketball in the United States. He learned to speak English after arriving in the U.S. He studied sociology, anthropology, and psychology at university. He has worked with the United Nations (UN) and was recognized as a cultural ambassador of Senegal by Senegalese ambassador to France, El Hadj Maguette Seye.

Ndiaye is outspoken in support of human rights for all. He particularly works to improve depictions of and the welfare of Africans, and the Senegalese people, as well as diaspora peoples in general. He supports these in his art and statements, and for better treatment of LGBTQIA+ people, especially as it concerns stereotypes and representation of Africa and homosexuality.

Ndiaye resides primarily in Paris, France and maintains a residence in Miami Beach, Florida while traveling extensively worldwide. He learned several languages, being fluent in English, French, and Spanish, and somewhat proficient in Hebrew and some languages of Senegal.

== Basketball career ==
Ndiaye attended secondary school at Fontiyon Tabl in Saint-Louis where he was MVP averaging seventeen points and six rebounds per game where he helped the team to a 2003 regional championship. He was discovered by an NBA program where the five best players of scores of dozens of countries are selected with which he attended a camp in South Africa.

Ndiaye emigrated to the United States to play at Southeastern Community College (SECC) in West Burlington, Iowa from 2005 to 2007. As a Blackeye he averaged six points and four rebounds per game as a freshman and about one-and-a-half blocks per game as a sophomore, when he competed at the ICCAC Impact Sports Juco Jamboree and was recognized as a top prospect. He grew another 3 in (8 cm) to 2.11 m (6 ft 11 in) around age 21 and gained about 25 lb (11 kg) of muscle weight in college.

Ndiaye transferred to Florida International University (FIU) in University Park as a junior where he attended from 2007 to 2009 and played as a Panther. A versatile big man, he played the power forward position at SECC and center at FIU. Plying for the Panthers Ndiaye ranked second on the team with twenty-one blocked shots and performed strongly rebounding while posting solid points, steal, and assist statistics. He suffered a knee injury which required microfracture surgery during his senior year, which ended his basketball career. During this time, he transitioned as a creative producer after he was discovered by fashion photographer Prescott McDonald.
