= Seaweed Mustache =

South Korean blackgaze band

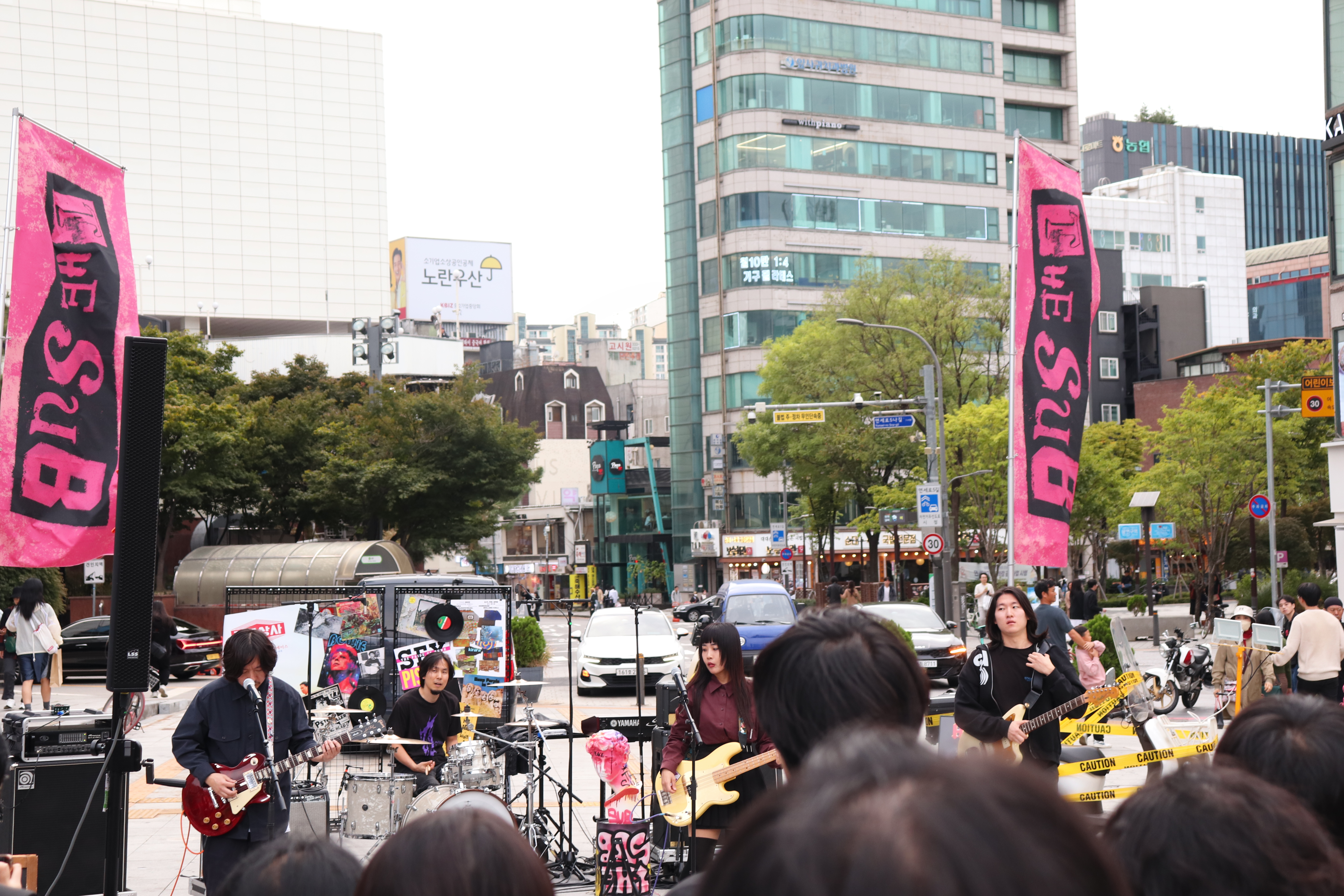
- Seaweed Mustache performing at The Sub Festival 2023

Background information
- Origin: Busan, South Korea
- Genres: Shoegaze; post-metal; blackgaze; post-rock
- Years active: 2014-present
- Labels: Cuomusic, Mirrorball Music
- Members: Choi Jihoon; Jeong Jooyi; Lee Wanki; Ban Jaehyeon

Seaweed Mustache (Korean: 미역수염; RR: Miyeok sooyeom) is a South Korean blackgaze band. The band currently consists of Choi Jihoon, Jeong Jooyi, Lee Wanki and Ban Jaehyeon. Since their formation in 2014, the band has released an EP The Whistle (2016) and two studio albums Bombora (2022) and 2 (2024).

== Career ==
Seaweed Mustache was formed in the autumn of 2014. They released their EP The Whistle in 2016, and Na Wonyoung of Weiv described the album as "The dark post-punk atmosphere throughout The Whistle created a unique style by meeting with the heavy guitar riffs that travel between grunge and shoegaze, and the singing method with various growling and shouting." But they were inactive for six years despite the EP's favourable reviews. The band interviewed about the hiatus, it's because of the birth and childcare of member Jeong Jooyi.

They released their first studio album Bombora in 2022. Music Y's Cho Ildong described the album as "In Bombora, a completely new music with a completely different level and orientation fills the audible space like a blurry and huge spray." The album was nominated for the Best Metal & Hardcore Album at the 2023 Korean Music Awards. In 2023, they performed on Naver Onstage. In 2024, they released their second studio album 2. They described the album as "2 is an album where there is a universe where rivers and the milky way flow".

== Discography ==
=== Studio albums ===
- Bombora (2022)
- 2 (2024)

=== EPs ===
- The Whistle (2016)
