= Bombora (album) =

2022 album by Seaweed Mustache

Studio album by Seaweed Mustache
- Released: September 15, 2022
- Genre: Shoegaze, post-metal
- Length: 43:19
- Label: Cuomusic
- Producer: Seaweed Mustache

Seaweed Mustache chronology
The Whistle (2016)	Bombora (2022)

Bombora is the debut studio album by South Korean band Seaweed Mustache. The album was released on 15 September 2022.

== Background ==
Seaweed Mustache goes on a six-year hiatus despite being well received by critics through its 2016 EP The Whistle. Member Jeong Jooyi interviewed about the period, saying that she had a break due to her childbirth and childcare, and that it was not easy to return. In 2016, the band acted as a duo, and after their return in 2022, Lee Wanki and Ban Jaehyeon joined as new members.

== Critical reception ==
Cho Ildong of Music Y reviewed "The energy delivered by Seaweed Mustache in Bombora is like the winter night sea, where the height and direction of waves that occur countless times are uncontrollable, and the energy of the huge water column is heavy and terrifyingly delivered even in pitch-black darkness." Cho Jihwan of Tonplein said "2022 was a year when albums of similar genres were released with quite high frequency, but Bombora is the hottest and most intense album among them." The member of the selection committee for the 2023 Korean Music Awards Lim Heeyoon described the album as "The fresh frequency division of drums, bass guitars, and guitars leads listeners to a very unfamiliar space," and the album was nominated for Best Metal & Hardcore Album.

== Track listing ==
No.	Title	Length
1.	"Seaweed Mustang"	5:01
2.	"Flush"	4:41
3.	"In the Wind" ("바람")	7:46
4.	"My Mind" ("마음")	6:29
5.	"Land"	6:02
6.	"Playground"	3:25
7.	"Keepitonthedownlow"	3:27
8.	"As the Sun Goes Down" ("해가지듯")	6:28
