= Bade (surname) =

Bade is a surname. Notable people with the surname include:

- Alexander Bade (born 1970), German footballer
- Jean-Pierre Bade (born 1960), French footballer
- Josse Bade or Jodocus Badius (1462–1535), French printer
- Lance Bade (born 1971), American target shooter
- Rachael Bade (born 1989), American journalist
- William F. Badè (1871–1936), American author and scholar
- William G. Bade (1924–2012), American mathematician
