= Eupithecia raniata =

Scientific classification
- Kingdom: Animalia
- Phylum: Arthropoda
- Clade: Pancrustacea
- Class: Insecta
- Order: Lepidoptera
- Family: Geometridae
- Genus: Eupithecia
- Species: E. raniata

Binomial name
- Eupithecia raniata L.B. Prout, 1958

Synonyms
- Eupithecia bini Vojnits, 1981; Eupithecia darjeelica Inoue, 2000

Species of moth

Eupithecia raniata is a moth in the family Geometridae. It is found in India (West Bengal), Nepal, Myanmar and northern Thailand.
