= Bini (surname) =

Bini is a surname. Notable people with the surname include:

- Aldo Bini (1915–1993), Italian road bicycle racer
- Alfredo Bini (1926–2010), Italian film producer
- Bino Bini (1900–1974), Italian fencer
- Bruno Bini (born 1954), former French footballer and manager of the French women's national team
- Armando Bini (1887–1950), Italian tenor
- Camilla Bini (born 1994), retired Italian rhythmic gymnast
- Dante Bini (born 1932), Italian industrial designer and architect
- Francesco Bini (born 1989), Italian football defender
- Giacomo Bini (1938–2014), Franciscan priest
- Gianni Bini (born 1974), Italian music producer
- Graziano Bini (born 1955), retired Italian professional football defender and manager
- Henri Bini (1931–2014), Monegasque fencer
- Joe Bini (born 1963), Werner Herzog's film editor
- Lorenzo Bini Smaghi (born 1956), Italian economist
- Lucio Bini (1908–1964), Italian psychiatrist
- Ola Bini (born 1982), Swedish programmer and Internet activist
- Pasquale Bini (1716–1770), Italian violinist
- Pierre Bini (1923–1991), French footballer
- Sebastián Bini (born 1979), Argentinean footballer
- Walter Bini (1930–1987), Brazilian clergyman and bishop
