= Beregadougou Classified Forest =

National park in burkina faso

The Beregadougou Classified Forest is a national park found in Burkina Faso. It was established in 1953. This site is 50 km^{2}.

In November 2017, the project Support the development of cashew nuts in the Comoé basin for the reduction of emissions from deforestation and forest degradation (PADA / REDD+) was launched in Bérégadougou.
