= Mangodara Department =

Mangodara
- Department
- Legend: Capital; Villages
- Country: Burkina Faso
- Province: Comoé Province

Area
  - Total: 988 sq mi (2,558 km^{2})

Population (2019 census)
  - Total: 67,598
  - Density: 68.44/sq mi (26.43/km^{2})
- Time zone: UTC+0 (GMT 0)

Mangodara is a department or commune of Comoé Province in southern Burkina Faso. Its capital lies at the town of Mangodara. According to the 2019 census the department has a total population of 67,598.

== Towns and villages ==
Place	Population (2019)	Location
Mangodara	9126	9°54′09″N 4°21′27″W
Banakelesso	230	9°50′05″N 4°22′18″W
Bondokoro-Dioula	358	9°51′29″N 4°25′52″W
Bondokoro-Dogosse	1638	9°54′07″N 4°26′25″W
Bounouba	1405	10°16′27″N 4°23′05″W
Dabokiri	186	9°44′10″N 4°23′33″W
Dandougou	3655	10°05′45″N 4°20′16″W
Diaradougou	1152	
Diarakorosso	2454	9°54′29″N 4°11′49″W
Diaya	1947	9°45′56″N 4°24′41″W
Diomanidougou	340	9°48′58″N 4°23′32″W
Farakorosso	2814	9°47′59″N 4°20′10″W
Ganso	886	9°53′28″N 4°19′01″W
Gnaminadougou	273	9°50′03″N 4°23′30″W
Gontiedougou	2026	9°47′08″N 4°15′09″W
Kando	214	9°47′20″N 4°22′14″W
Koflande	2724	10°13′47″N 4°26′10″W
Larabin	1093	9°55′23″N 4°20′07″W
Linguekoro	1253	10°08′59″N 4°24′04″W
Logogniegue	2277	9°54′19″N 4°31′03″W
Madiasso	7200	10°13′05″N 4°19′02″W
Massade-Yirikoro	361	9°42′27″N 4°24′21″W
Mouroukoudougou	825	9°52′42″N 4°16′12″W
Nerekorosso	295	
Niamango	854	9°49′47″N 4°20′13″W
Niambrigo	1590	9°56′22″N 4°18′12″W
Noumoutiedougou	2813	9°55′01″N 4°16′30″W
Sakedougou	412	9°47′19″N 4°25′44″W
Sirakoro	938	9°47′28″N 4°22′56″W
Sokoura I	2253	10°00′05″N 4°20′47″W
Sokoura II	4040	10°04′32″N 4°23′51″W
Tiebata	1192	9°51′12″N 4°16′06″W
Tomikorosso	945	9°53′00″N 4°21′45″W
Torandougou	1793	9°51′33″N 4°24′20″W
Touroukoro	6036	10°02′14″N 4°24′08″W
