= Kiến Thành =

Kiến Thành may refer to several places in Vietnam:

- Kiến Thành, An Giang, a rural commune of Chợ Mới District, An Giang Province
- Kiến Thành, Đắk Nông, a rural commune of Đăk R'Lấp District

== See also ==
- Kiên Thành (disambiguation)
