= Boulo, Central African Republic =

Boulo
- Location in Central African Republic
- Coordinates: 7°22′10″N 17°11′48″E
- Country: Central African Republic
- Prefecture: Ouham
- Sub-prefecture: Markounda
- Commune: Nana Markounda

Boulo is a village situated in Ouham Prefecture, Central African Republic.

== History ==
A clash between RJ and Seleka ensued in Boulo at the end of December 2017, killing one Seleka militia. As a result, Seleka burned ten houses in the village, causing the displacement of the villagers.

An armed group attacked the FACA position in Boulo on 24 November 2024. Although FACA soldiers managed to repel the attack, four houses were burned, and one woman was injured. Local governments attributed CPC to the attack. However, CMSPR, an armed group led by Armel Sayo, claimed the attack.

== Economy ==
In 2020, a gold deposit was discovered in Boulo.

== Education ==
There is a school in the village.
