= Comoé Province =

Coordinates: 10°38′N 4°45′W

Comoé
- Province
- Location in Burkina Faso

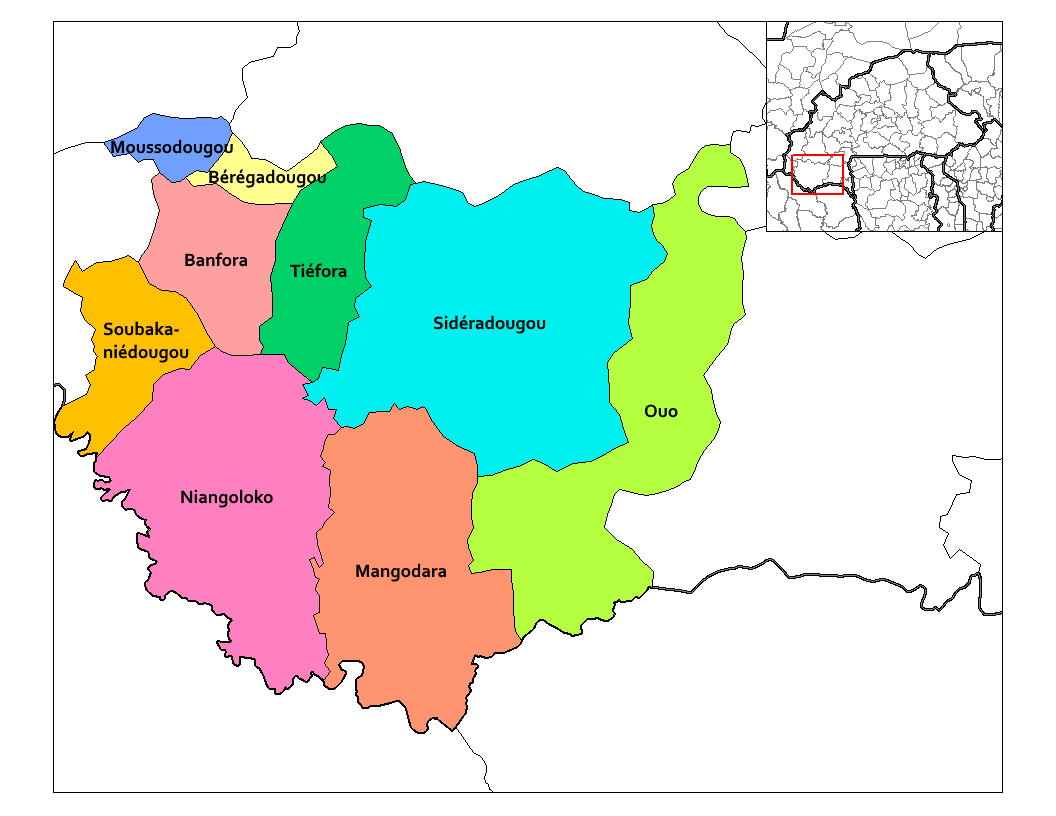
- Provincial map of its departments
- Country: Burkina Faso
- Region: Cascades Region
- Capital: Banfora

Area
  - Province: 15,302 km^{2} (5,908 sq mi)

Population (2019 census)
  - Province: 632,695
  - Density: 41.347/km^{2} (107.09/sq mi)
  - Urban: 150,745
- Time zone: UTC+0 (GMT 0)
- ISO 3166 code: BF-COM

Comoé is one of the 45 provinces of Burkina Faso, located in its Cascades Region. The capital of Comoé is Banfora. The population of Comoé was 632,695 in 2019.

Comoé is divided into 9 departments:

The Departments of Comoé
| Commune | Capital | Population (Census 2006) |
|---|---|---|
| Banfora Department | Banfora | 106,815 |
| Bérégadougou Department | Bérégadougou | 11,755 |
| Mangodara Department | Mangodara | 49,746 |
| Moussodougou Department | Moussodougou | 10,444 |
| Niangoloko Department | Niangoloko | 51,345 |
| Ouo Department | Ouo | 23,450 |
| Sidéradougou Department | Sidéradougou | 76,540 |
| Soubakaniédougou Department | Soubakaniédougou | 27,945 |
| Tiéfora Department | Tiéfora | 42,494 |

== See also ==
- Regions of Burkina Faso
- Provinces of Burkina Faso
- Departments of Burkina Faso
