= Regions of Burkina Faso =

Burkina Faso is divided into 17 administrative regions. Each region is administered by a governor.

== Regions of Burkina Faso (until 2025) ==
Per Law No.40/98/AN in 1998, Burkina Faso adhered to decentralization to provide administrative and financial autonomy to local communities. Most of these, according to their individual articles, were implemented on 2 July 2001.

| Region | Area (km^{2}) | Population (2024) | Density (per km^{2} in 2024) | Administrative capital |
|---|---|---|---|---|
| Boucle du Mouhoun | 34,333 | 2,120,626 | 62.1 | Dédougou |
| Cascades | 18,424 | 944,950 | 51.3 | Banfora |
| Centre | 2,869 | 3,623,784 | 1,292 | Ouagadougou |
| Centre-Est | 14,710 | 1,787,201 | 121.9 | Tenkodogo |
| Centre-Nord | 19,677 | 2,134,352 | 107.6 | Kaya |
| Centre-Ouest | 21,752 | 1,866,251 | 85.9 | Koudougou |
| Centre-Sud | 11,457 | 872,845 | 77.2 | Manga |
| Est | 46,694 | 2,240,243 | 48.5 | Fada N'gourma |
| Hauts-Bassins | 25,343 | 2,572,566 | 101.5 | Bobo Dioulasso |
| Nord | 16,414 | 1,939,319 | 119.7 | Ouahigouya |
| Plateau-Central | 8,545 | 1,096,483 | 128.3 | Ziniaré |
| Sahel | 35,360 | 1,223,695 | 34.6 | Dori |
| Sud-Ouest | 16,153 | 986,700 | 61.1 | Gaoua |

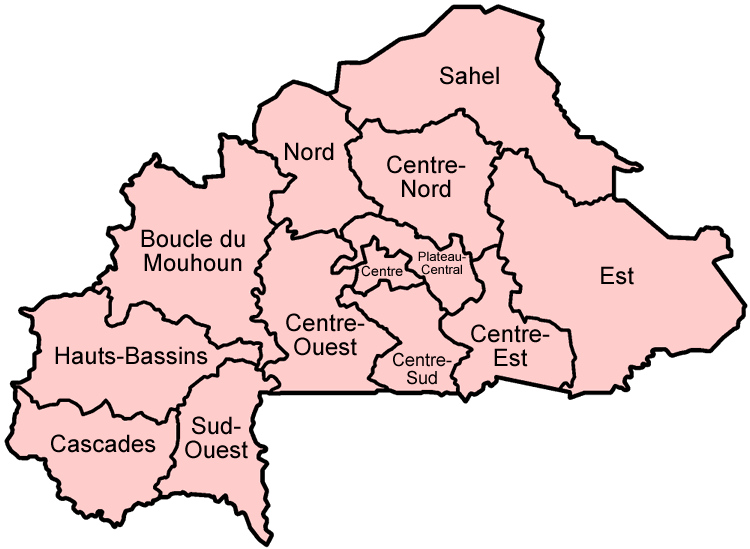
Regions of Burkina Faso until 2025

These regions are divided into 45 provinces and subdivided into 351 communes.

== Regions of Burkina Faso (2025 - present) ==
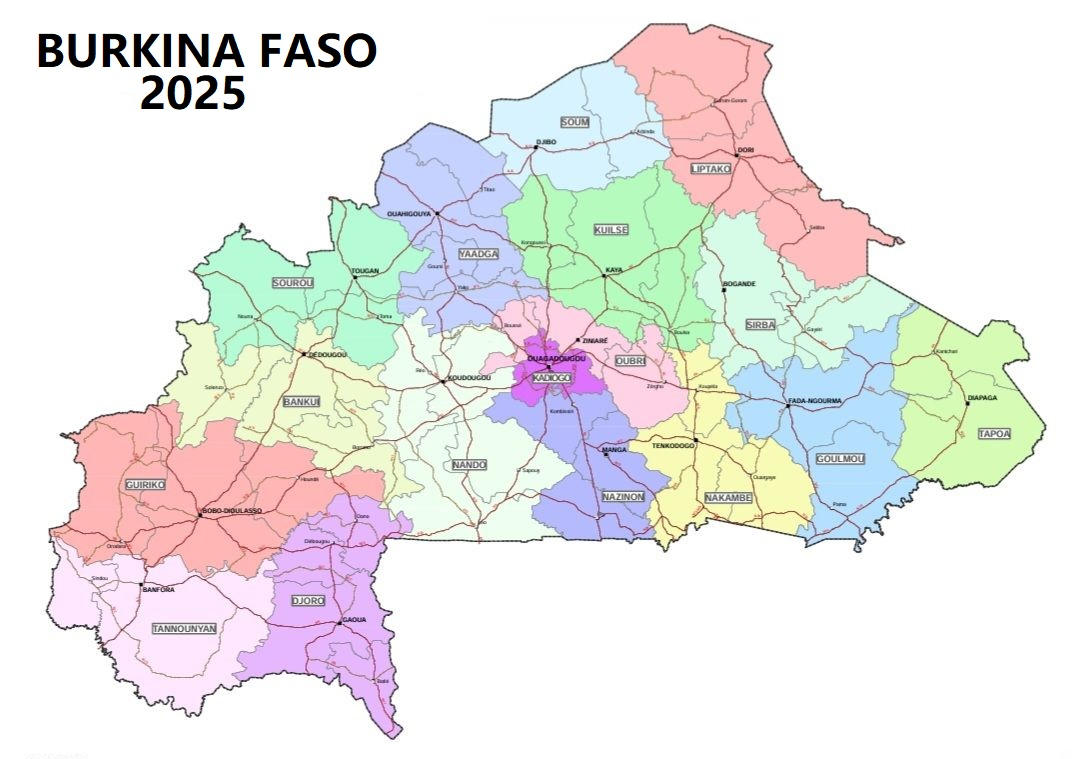
Map of Burkina Faso (since 2025)

In July 2025, Burkina Faso expanded from 13 to 17 regions and from 45 to 47 provinces. This reform particularly affects Boucle du Mouhoun, the East, and the Sahel, which cover 43% of the territory. The reorganization is related to Burkinabé desire to cut cultural and economic ties to France in a step towards full independence and decolonization. A period of six months was given for the full implementation of the reform.

Addressing the Minister of Territorial Administration, Decentralization and Security (MATDS), Colonel Boukaré Zoungrana immediately recalled that "administrative division is an organization of the national territory into administrative entities to ensure, within the framework of a unitary State, the representation and permanence of the State's presence throughout the national territory."

For the Minister of State in charge of Territorial Administration, Emile Zerbo, this new organizational system stems from the vision of the President of Burkina Faso, Captain Ibrahim Traoré, and prioritizes the criterion of strategic defense.

Four new regions, Soum, Sirba, Tapoa, and Sourou, have been created with designated capitals, while the names of the provinces and regions have been adapted to local names.

The principal changes are the creation of:

- Sourou Region is formed with Kossi Province, Nayala Province and Sourou Province. It covers an area of 14,611 km². The remaining Boucle du Mouhoun Region, now renamed as Bankui has an area of 19,722 km².

- Sirba Region is formed by Gnagna Province and Komondjari Province. Its area is 13,513 km².

- Tapoa Region is formed only by the Tapoa Province. It covers an area of 14,572 km².

- Goulmou Region is formed by the Gourma Province and Kompienga Province. It covers an area of 18,143 km².

- Liptako Region is formed by the Oudalan Province, Séno Province and Yagha Province. It has an area of 23,155 km².

- Soum Region is formed only by the Soum Province with an area of 12,205 km².

Notice the current situation:

| New name | Former name | Capital | Area (km²) | Meaning of the new names |
|---|---|---|---|---|
| Bankui | Boucle du Mouhoun | Dédougou | 19,722 | Bankui is a name composed of "Ban", that means forests and "kui", which means village or location. |
| Djôrô | Sud-Ouest | Gaoua | 16,153 | Name referring to the widespread practice of the initiation culture known as “djôrô” in the region. |
| Goulmou | Est | Fada N'gourma | 18,143 | Historical name which refers to an ethnolinguistic and cultural group whose loyalty is to the king of Fada N’Gourma |
| Guiriko | Hauts-Bassins | Bobo-Dioulasso | 25,343 | Name referring to the ancient kingdom founded in the 18th century and of which Sya, present-day Bobo-Dioulasso, was the capital. Historically, it was a commercial and political space of the kingdom. |
| Kadiogo | Centre | Ouagadougou | 2,869 | Kadiogo or kaadyoogo originally referred to a river that flowed not far from the Moog-Naaba's palace. Water for the Moog-Naaba's personal use was taken from this river. |
| Kuilsé | Centre-Nord | Kaya | 19,677 | Kuilsé in the Mooré language means watercourse. This name refers to the watercourses that are in the region (the Nakanbé River, Lakes Bam, Dem and Sian). |
| Liptako | Sahel | Dori | 23,155 | Liptako is composed of "Liba" which means "to overthrow" and "ta-a-ko" which means "one cannot", in the Fulfulde language. |
| Nakambé | Centre-Est | Tenkodogo | 14,710 | Hydronym taken from one of the country's main rivers that irrigates the region. The name Nakambé of the former White Volta River came about during the Democratic and Popular Revolution. |
| Nando | Centre-Ouest | Koudougou | 21,752 | Nando is the old name in the Gourounssi language for the town of Koudougou. |
| Nazinon | Centre-Sud | Manga | 11,457 | Hydronym taken from one of the country's main rivers that irrigates the region. The name Nazinon of the former Red Volta River came about during the Democratic and Popular Revolution. |
| Oubri | Plateau-Central | Ziniaré | 8,545 | Name referring to the third grandson of Ouédraogo who founded the kingdom of Wogdgo. It is one of the Mossi kingdoms. |
| Sirba | Est | Bogandé | 13,513 | Hydronym taken from a watercourse which has its source in Ganzourgou and which crosses the two provinces of the region. |
| Soum | Sahel | Djibo | 12,205 | A hydronym that designates a pond in the region and forms the border between the Séno-mango sand dunes and the savannah. This name refers to the ecosystem formed by the Soum pond with the sand dunes. |
| Sourou | Boucle du Mouhoun | Tougan | 14,611 | Hydronym taken from an important watercourse (distributary of the Mouhoun River) which irrigates vast plains of the region and whose agro-sylvo-pastoral, faunal and fishing potential constitutes important resources for the harmonious development of this entity. |
| Tannounyan | Cascades | Banfora | 18,424 | Tannounyan in Turka and Gouin languages means hills or cliffs. This proposition refers to the relief of the region with its fascinating landscapes, including the chain of domes of Fabedougou, the peaks of Sindou, Mount Ténakourou and the piton of Bérégadougou. |
| Tapoa | Est | Diapaga | 14,572 | Hydronym taken from the main watercourse that crosses the region. |
| Yaadga | Nord Region | Ouahigouya | 16,414 | Name referring to the name of the grandson of Naba Oubri who founded the kingdom of Yatenga. This kingdom is one of the Mossi kingdoms. |

== See also ==
- List of regions of Burkina Faso by Human Development Index
- Provinces of Burkina Faso
- Departments/Communes of Burkina Faso
- Geography of Burkina Faso
- ISO 3166-2:BF

== See also ==
- Regions of Burkina Faso at Statoids.com
