= Tannounyan Region =

Region of Burkina Faso

Tannounyan Cascades
- Region
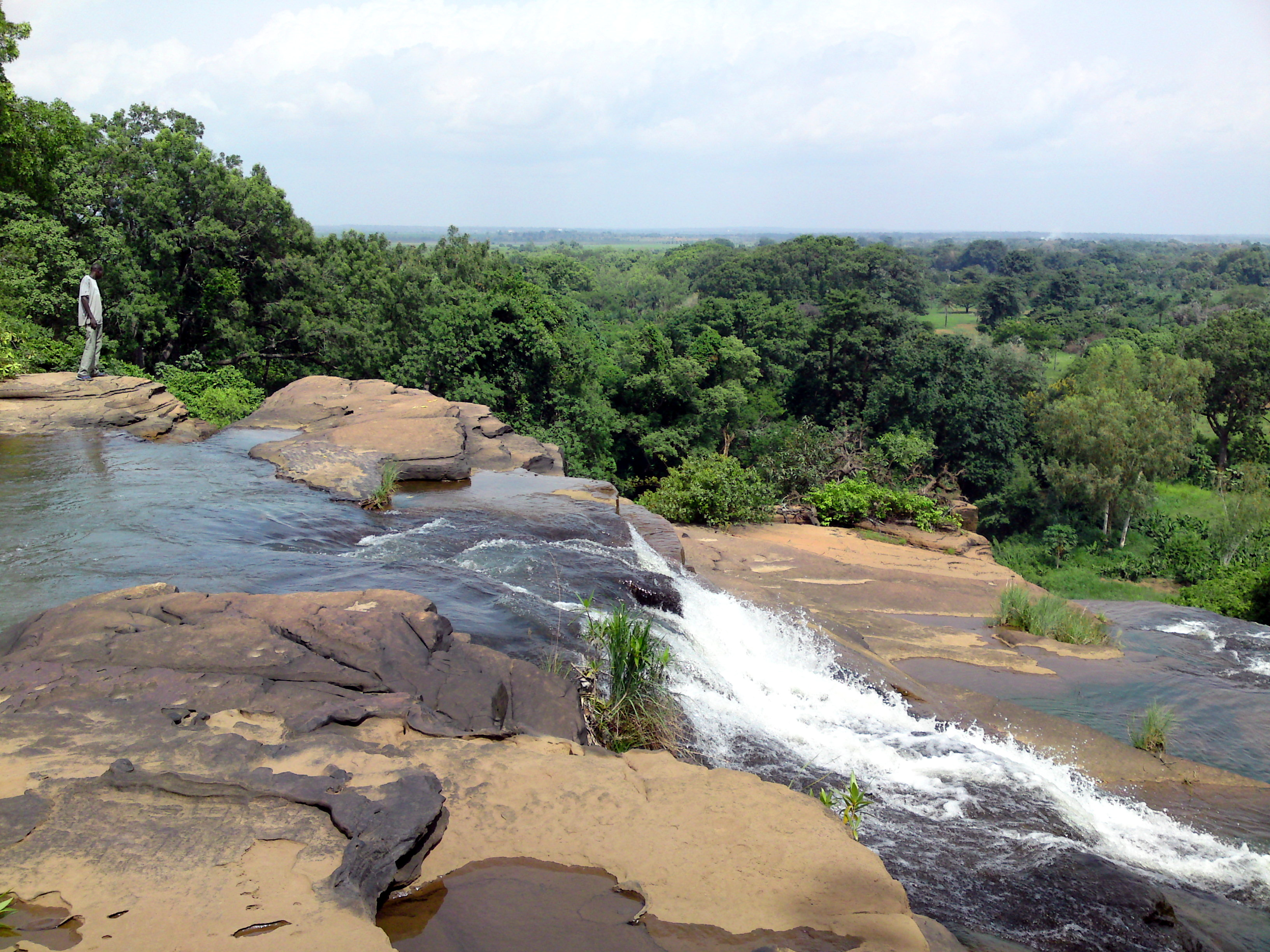

- Location in Burkina Faso
- Coordinates: 10°16′N 4°30′W
- Country: Burkina Faso
- Capital: Banfora

Area
  - Region: 7,117 sq mi (18,434 km^{2})

Population (2019 census)
  - Region: 812,062
  - Density: 114.10/sq mi (44.052/km^{2})
  - Urban: 157,808
- Time zone: UTC+0 (GMT 0)
- HDI (2017): 0.432 low · 3rd

Tannounyan, formerly known as Cascades ([kas.kad], "waterfalls"), is one of Burkina Faso's 17 administrative regions. It was created on 2 July 2001. The population of Tannounyan was 812,062 in 2019. It is the second least populous region in Burkina Faso and contains 3.96% of all Burkinabé. The region's capital is Banfora. Two provinces, Comoé and Léraba, make up the region. The Cascades de Karfiguéla gave the region its previous name.

As of 2019, the population of the region was 812,062. As of 2007, the literacy rate in the region was 20%, compared to a national average of 28.3%. The coverage of cereal need compared to the total production of the region was 117%.

== Geography ==
Most of Burkina Faso is a wide plateau formed by riverine systems and is called falaise de Banfora. There are three major rivers, the Red Volta, Black Volta and White Volta, which cut through different valleys. The climate is generally hot, with unreliable rains across different seasons. Gold and quartz are common minerals found across the country, while manganese deposits are also common. The dry season is usually from October to May, and rains are common during the wet season from June to September. The soil texture is porous and hence the yield is also poor. The average elevation is around 200 m (660 ft) to 300 m (980 ft) above mean sea level. The region contains Mount Tenakourou, which is the country's highest peak with an elevation of 747 m (2,451 ft). Among West African countries, Burkina Faso has the largest elephant population and the country is replete with game reserves. The southern regions are more tropical in nature and have savannah and forests. The principal river is the Black Volta, that originates in the southern region and drains into Ghana. The areas near the rivers usually have flies like tsetse and similium, which are carriers of sleep sickness and river blindness. The average rainfall in the region is around 100 cm (39 in) compared to northern regions that receive only 25 cm (9.8 in) rainfall.

== Demographics ==
Historical population
Year	Pop.	±% p.a.
1985	253,360	—
1996	334,303	+2.55%
2006	531,808	+4.75%
2019	812,062	+3.31%

As of 2019, the population of the region was 812,062 with 51.43% females. The population in the region was 3.96% of the total population of the country. The child mortality rate was 81, infant mortality rate was 96 and the mortality of children under five was 170. As of 2007, among the working population, there were 71.9% employees, 20.2% under employed, 7.7% inactive people, 8% not working and 0.2% unemployed people in the region.

== Economy ==
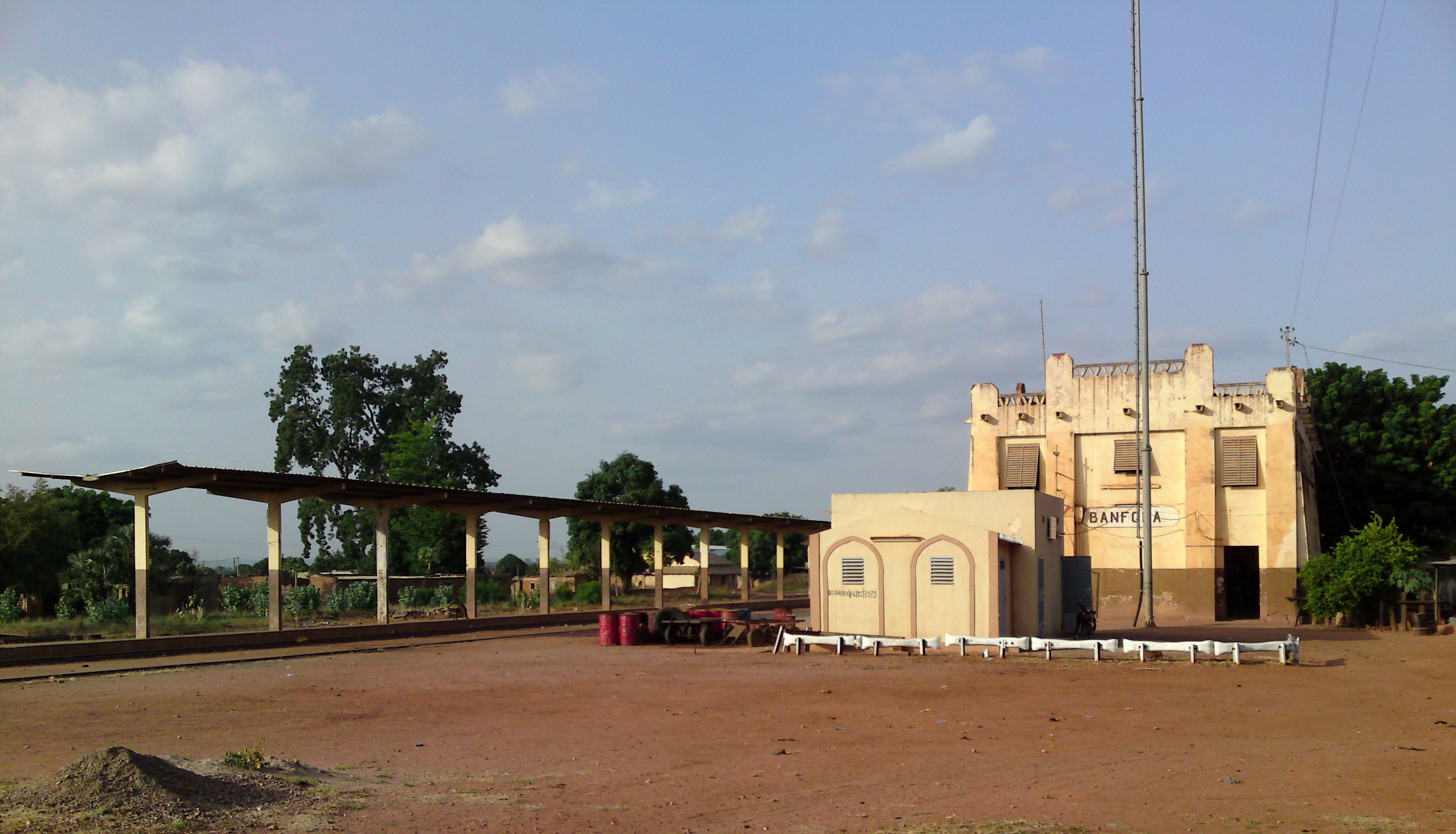
Banfora

As of 2007, there were 229.3 km (142.5 mi) of highways, 335.9 km (208.7 mi) of regional roads and 303.4 km (188.5 mi) of county roads. The first set of car traffic was 22, first set of two-wheeler traffic was 1,878 and the total classified road network was 869. The total corn produced during 2015 was 148,349 tonnes, cotton was 44,903 tonnes, cowpea was 13,778 tonnes, ground nut was 15,743 tonnes, millet was 5,961 tonnes, rice was 28,799 tonnes and sorghum was 19,126 tonnes. The coverage of cereal need compared to the total production of the region was 117.00 per cent. As of 2007, the literacy rate in the region was 20.4 per cent, compared to a national average of 28.3 per cent. The gross primary enrolment was 67.7 per cent, pos-primary was 27.5 per cent and gross secondary school enrolment was 9.4. There were 192 boys and 110 girls enrolled in the primary and post-secondary level. There were 4 teachers in primary & post-secondary level, while there were 493 teachers in post-primary and post-secondary level.

== Local administration ==
The Provinces of Cascades
Province	Capital	2006
Comoé Province	Banfora	400,534
Léraba Province	Sindou	124,422

Burkina Faso gained independence from France in 1960. It was originally called Upper Volta. There have been military coups till 1983 when Captain Thomas Sankara took control and implemented radical left wing policies. He was ousted by Blaise Compaore, who continued for 27 years until 2014, when a popular uprising ended his rule. As per Law No.40/98/AN in 1998, Burkina Faso adhered to decentralization to provide administrative and financial autonomy to local communities. There are 13 administrative regions, each governed by a Governor. The regions are subdivided into 45 provinces, which are further subdivided into 351 communes. The communes may be urban or rural and are interchangeable. There are other administrative entities like department and village. An urban commune has typically 10,000 people under it. If any commune is not able to get 75 per cent of its planned budget in revenues for 3 years, the autonomy is taken off. The communes are administered by elected Mayors. The communes are stipulated to develop economic, social and cultural values of its citizens. A commune has financial autonomy and can interact with other communes, government agencies or international entities.
