= Digra =

Digra or digras, or variation, may refer to:

== People ==
- Moald Digra (7th c.), a mythical character from the Saga of Halfdan the Valiant
- Olaf II of Norway (995–1030) known as Old Norse: Olaf digra, lit. 'Olaf the Stout'
- Þorbjörg “digra” Ólafsdóttir (born 960), ancestress of Jón korpur Hrafnsson

== Places ==
- Digra, Aksai Chin, India/China; see List of locations in Aksai Chin
- Digras, Yavatmal, Maharastra, India; a city
- Digras, village in Beed district, Maharashtra, India

== Other uses ==
- Digital Games Research Association (DiGRA)
- dissociated glucocorticoid receptor agonist (DIGRA, DIGRAs)

== See also ==
- Digre
- Digri
- Digraph (disambiguation)
- GRA (disambiguation)
