= 02446 =

02446 may refer to:

- Ambajogai, a tehsil in Maharashtra, India
- Brookline, Massachusetts, U.S., a town
- Digras, Beed, a village in Maharashtra, India
- Heimbach, a town in North Rhine-Westphalia, Germany
- Ly-Fontaine, a commune in Aisne department, France
