= Nanjing University of Aeronautics and Astronautics =

University in Nanjing, Jiangsu, China

Coordinates: 32°02′09.62″N 118°48′49.71″E

- 南京航空航天大学
- Motto: 智周万物, 道济天下
- Type: Public
- Established: 1952; 74 years ago
- Affiliations: SSU
- President: Jiang Bin (姜斌)
- Academic staff: 1,398
- Undergraduates: 19,899
- Postgraduates: 11,835
- Location: Nanjing, Jiangsu, China
- Campus: Urban
- Website: nuaa.edu.cn

Chinese name
- Simplified Chinese: 南京航空航天大学
- Traditional Chinese: 南京航空航天大學
Transcriptions
Standard Mandarin
- Hanyu Pinyin: Nánjīng Hángkōng Hángtīan Dàxué

The Nanjing University of Aeronautics and Astronautics (NUAA, 南京航空航天大学) is a public university in Nanjing, Jiangsu, China. It is affiliated with the Ministry of Industry and Information Technology. The university is part of Project 211, Seven Sons of National Defence, and the Double First-Class Construction.

== History ==
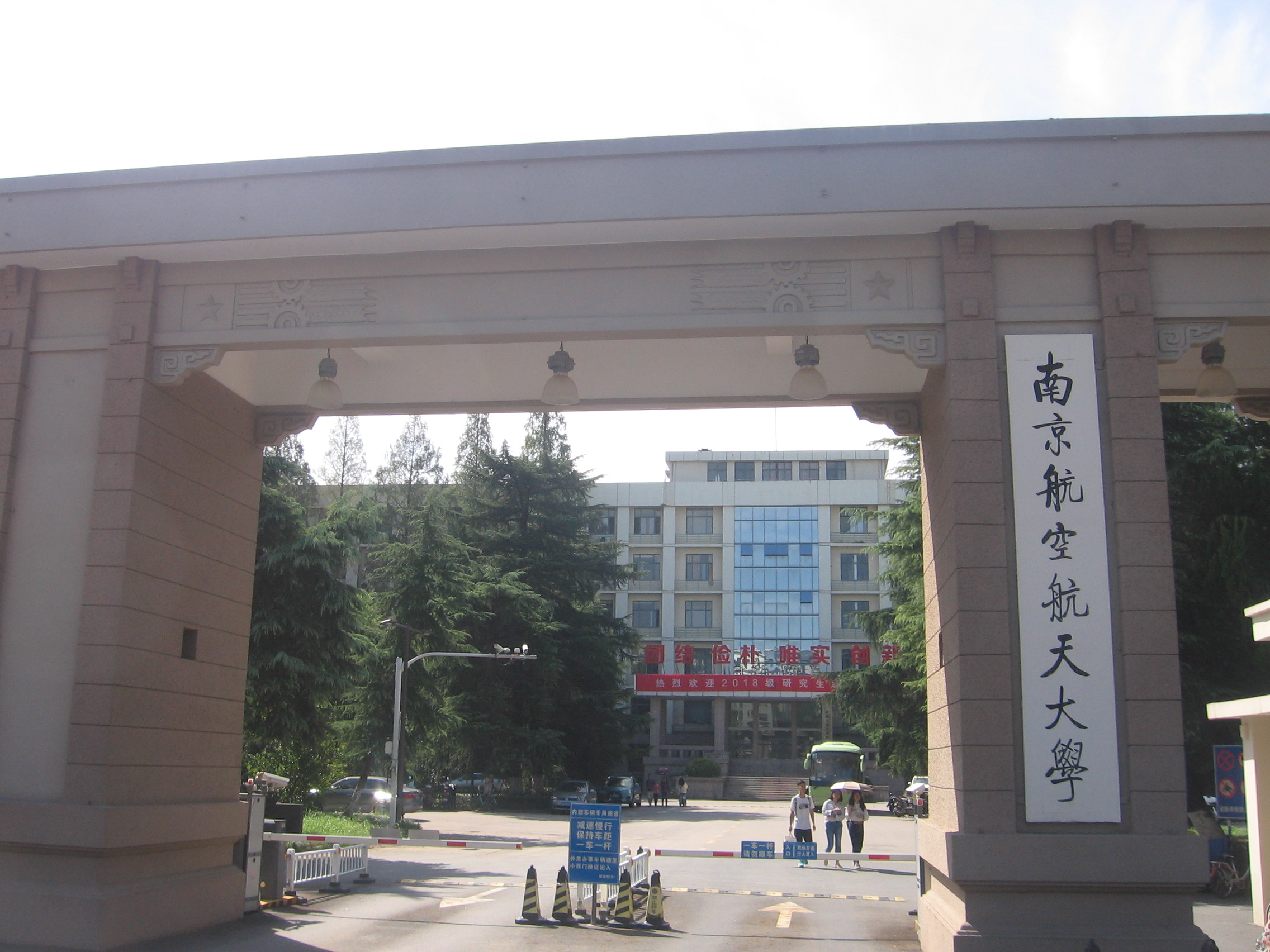
Main Entrance of Ming Palace Campus

Founded in October 1952, as the Nanjing College of Aviation Industry, Nanhang was renamed in 1956 to Nanjing Aeronautical Institute, and in 1993 to its current name.

== Campus ==
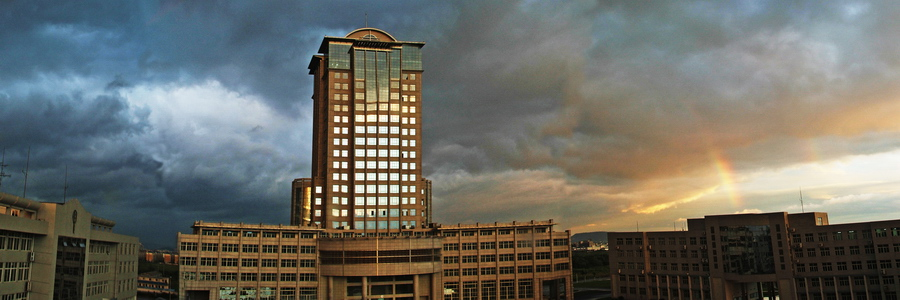
Main Building on Jiangjun Road Campus

Nanhang comprises three campuses: Ming Palace Campus, Jiangjun Road (将军路) Campus, and Tianmu Lake Campus, along with an international campus currently under development in Jiangbei New District. Minggugong Campus is abbreviated as "Headquarters," General Road Campus as "Jiangning Campus," and Tianmu Lake Campus as "Liyang Campus." The Tianmu Lake Campus is alternatively referred to as the "Liyang Campus."

The Ming Palace Campus is situated in the Qinhuai District of Nanjing, bordered to the south by Zhongshan East Road, to the north by Ruijin Road, and to the east by Mido Street. It occupies the original site of the Imperial Palace of the Ming Dynasty, where the Imperial Temple is designated as the location of the Imperial Garden on the present campus. The old Imperial River, known as the Royal Belt River, traverses the school, which features two rows of stately French sycamores that enhance its aesthetic appeal, beside the Jiangsu Aviation and Aerospace Museum located on the premises.

The Jiangning Campus is situated in the Jiangning District of Nanjing, bordered by Baijia Lake to the east and General Mountain and Cuiping Mountain to the west. The Jiangning Campus is bifurcated into eastern and western parts by the Nanjing Airport Expressway, which are linked by flyovers and culverts. The Jiangning Campus West comprises 7 instructional buildings, 1 engineering training facility, 22 residential halls, and 5 dining establishments. The Jiangning Campus East comprises four cafeterias, three instructional buildings, and thirteen residential buildings.

The Tianmu Lake Campus is situated in the southern region of Liyang City, a county-level city located southeast of Nanjing. Bordered by Meilingyu Avenue to the north, East Binhe Road to the south, South Street to the east, and South Yanshan Road to the west, the campus encompasses an area of 969 acres, with a projected total construction area of approximately 530,000 square meters.

== Colleges ==
NUAA has 18 colleges:

- College of Aerospace Engineering
- College of Energy and Power Engineering
- College of Automation Engineering
- College of Electronic and Information Engineering/College of Integrated Circuits
- College of Mechanical and Electrical Engineering
- College of Material Science and Technology
- College of Civil Aviation
- College of Mathematics/College of Physics
- College of Economics and Management (accredited by Association of MBAs)
- College of Humanities and Social Sciences
- College of Advanced Vocational Education
- College of Astronautics
- College of Arts
- College of Foreign Languages
- College of Computer Science and Technology/College of Artificial Intelligence
- Jincheng College
- Graduate School
- Academy of Frontier Science
- College of International Education

== Research centers and laboratories ==
- Institute for Grey Systems Studies
- State Key Laboratory of Mechanics and Control of Mechanical Structures
- State Key Laboratory of Helicopter Rotor Dynamics
- National Engineering Research Center for Processing of Difficult-to-Machine Materials
- State Key Laboratory of Air Traffic Flow Management

== Programs ==
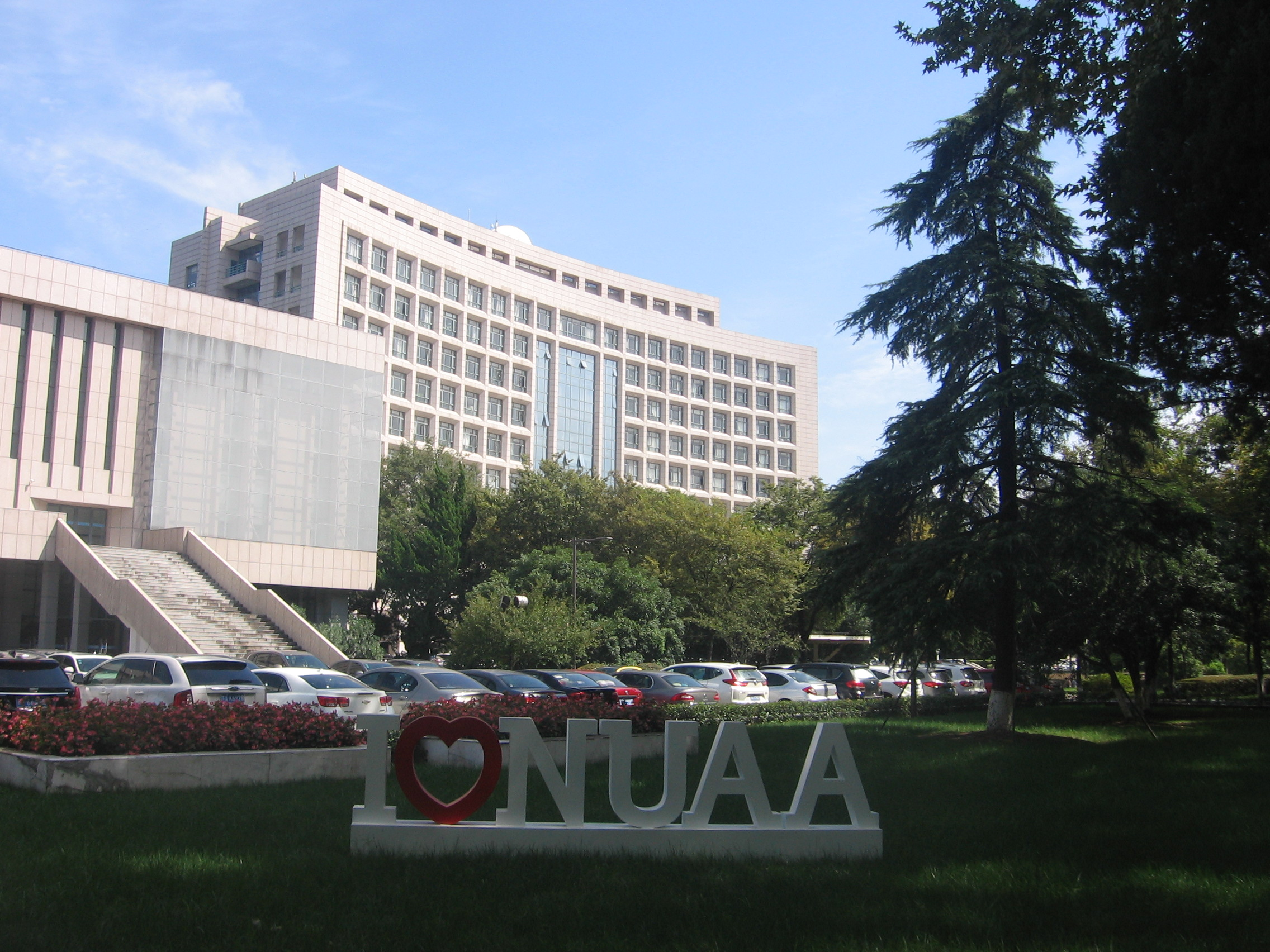
Ming Palace Campus

University rankings

Global – Overall
- QS World: =680 (2026)

Regional – Overall
- QS Asia: =245 (2025)

NUAA offers a wide range of programs including 46 undergraduate programs, 127 master programs and 52 doctoral programs. 2 first grade and 9 second grade disciplines are awarded national key disciplines. The former includes Aerospace Science & Technology and Mechanics. The latter includes Aircraft Design, Aerospace Propulsion Theory & Engineering, Manufacturing Engineering of Aerospace Vehicle, Man-Machine and Environmental Engineering, General and Fundamental Mechanics, Solid Mechanics, Fluid Mechanics, Engineering Mechanics, Mechanical Manufacture & Automation. 8 disciplines are key disciplines of the Commission of National Defense Science, Technology and Industry, such as Tele-Communication & Information Systems, Technology of Micro Air Vehicles, etc. 10 disciplines are key disciplines of Jiangsu Province, such as Mechanical Design and Theory, Navigation Guidance & Control, etc. 4 disciplines such as Aircraft Design, Mechanical Manufacture & Automation, Engineering Mechanics, Manufacturing Engineering of Aerospace Vehicle are especially set up for "Changjiang Scholar Award" professors. Besides, NUAA has set up 12 postdoctoral programs, such as Aerospace Science & Technology, etc.

== International students ==
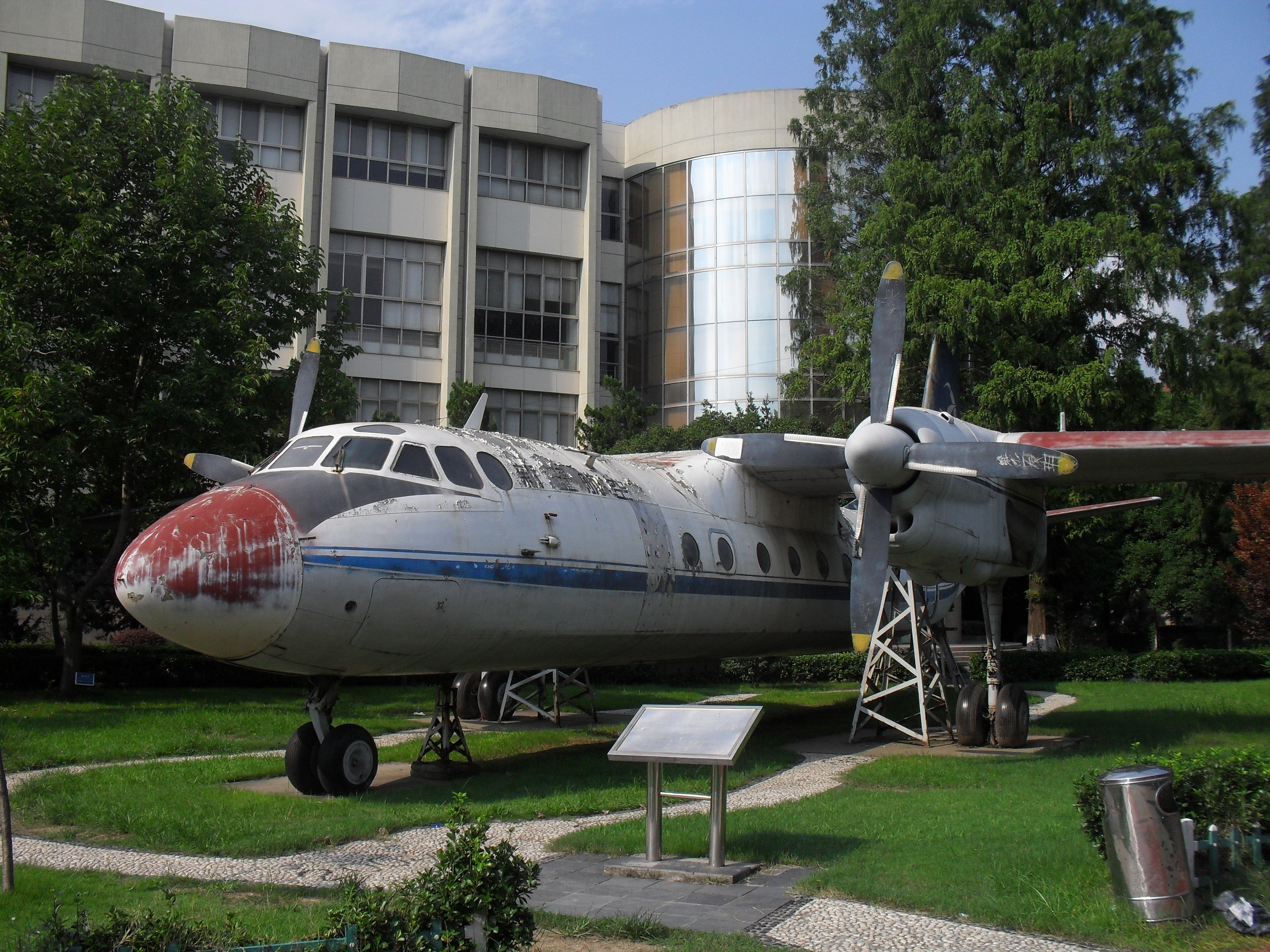
Old civil aircraft on campus

The university started enrolling international students largely since 2005 after the establishment of the College of International Education. In 2005, the first batch of full-time international undergraduate students were enrolled with major of Aerospace Engineering, coming from neighboring countries like Nepal and Pakistan. Since then over 400 international students have graduated from NUAA with degrees in majors including Aerospace Engineering, International Business, Mechanical Engineering and Software Engineering. Currently there are over 470 undergraduate international students from 40 countries like Bangladesh, Nepal, India, Pakistan, Indonesia, Malaysia, Kenya, Ghana, Sri Lanka, Saudi Arabia, Yemen, Nigeria, etc.

The university has been enrolling post-graduate international students for several years as well. Dozens of Master and Ph.D-level students have since graduated with various majors and specialties. It also provides scholarships to outstanding international students at both undergraduate and post-graduate levels under various government scholarship schemes including the China Government Scholarship and Distinguished International Students Scholarship schemes.

Apart from full-time students, NUAA has been hosting exchange students coming from universities in Australia, Canada, France and Germany. Every year, under the university's exchange and summer programs with international universities, dozens of international students come to NUAA to study at both undergraduate and post-graduate levels.

NUAA's international students have played important role in lifting its research performance and image in the world. In 2018, a paper authored by a Pakistani doctoral student of NUAA Distinguished Professor Liu Sifeng was quoted by Nature Index, and was later indexed in Essential Science Indicators, a database of the world's top 1% highly cited publications.

== Achievements ==
- In 2014, NUAA has produced three Unmanned Ornithopters.
- In 2016, an aircraft designed by NUAA engineering students won the 33rd Annual American Helicopter Society Student Design Competition.
- The university has produced a great many highly cited scientific papers, including work that has been picked up by Nature INDEX.
- Since NUAA's establishment, NUAA's faculty, students and research staff have produced more than 40 unmanned aerial vehicles (UAVs, or 'drones') for China (see, List of unmanned aerial vehicles of China).
- In 2017, "Kun dragon" (Kun Long) AG600 (AVIC AG600), designed to be the world's largest amphibious aircraft, had its first successful test flight. The AG600 was co-developed by the NUAA Innovation Center and the China Aviation Industry General Aircraft Co., Ltd., including work on the engine cooling systems.

== Journals and Publications ==
- Transactions of Nanjing University of Aeronautics and Astronautics.
- Journal of Nanjing University of Aeronautics and Astronautics.
- Grey Systems: Theory and Applications.
- Journal of Vibration Engineering
- Journal of Date Acquisition and Processing

== Notable faculty & alumni ==
- Liu Sifeng, an international expert on Grey System Theory and Grey Relational Analysis.
- Jeffrey Yi-Lin Forrest, a professor of mathematics, systems science, economics, and finance at Pennsylvania State System of Higher Education (Slippery Rock campus) (SSHE), guest professor at Nanhang, and founder and president of the International Institute for General Systems Studies (IIGSS).
- Ye Peijian, a renowned Chinese aerospace scientist.
- Çetin Kaya Koç, cryptographic engineer.
- Wu Guanghui, designer of the COMAC C919
- Huang Lingcai, designer of the AVIC AG600
- Wu Ximing, chief designer of the Z-10, Z-11, and the Z-19 helicopters
- Lin Zuoming, Politician and the Chairman of the Board of AVIC
- Lü Zushan, Governor of Zhejiang Province
- Liu Weiping, Governor of Gansu Province
- Hu Wenming, Former chairman of China State Shipbuilding Corporation
- Chen Duling, Actress

== See also ==
- List of unmanned aerial vehicles of China
- NUAA Unmanned Ornithopter
- NUAA unmanned helicopter
- Seven Sons of National Defence
