= Xiang Jinwu =

Chinese engineer

- Born: February 1964 (age 62); Pingjiang County, Hunan, China
- Education: Nanjing University of Aeronautics and Astronautics
- Scientific career
- Fields: Aerocraft
- Workplaces: Beihang University

Chinese name
- Traditional Chinese: 向錦武
- Simplified Chinese: 向锦武
Transcriptions
Standard Mandarin
- Hanyu Pinyin: Xiàng Jǐnwǔ

Xiang Jinwu (Chinese: 向锦武; born February 1964) is a Chinese engineer and professor at Beihang University.

== Biography ==
Xiang was born in Pingjiang County, Hunan, in February 1964. He secondary studied at Xiangyin No.1 High School. After graduating from Nanjing University of Aeronautics and Astronautics in 1984, he became a designer at China Helicopter Design and Research Institute. He received his master's degree in mechanics from Northwestern Polytechnical University in 1990 and doctor's degree from Nanjing University of Aeronautics and Astronautics in 1993, respectively. he was a postdoctoral fellow at Nanjing University of Aeronautics and Astronautics between 1993 and 1995.

He joined the faculty of Beihang University in 1995.

== Contribution ==
He was the chief designer of Long Eagle nmanned aerial vehicle (UAV).

== Honours and awards ==
- 2006 State Science and Technology Progress Award (Second Class)
- 2008 State Science and Technology Progress Award (First Class)
- 2010 Industrial Innovation Award of the Ho Leung Ho Lee Foundation
- 2017 State Science and Technology Progress Award (First Class)
- April 28, 2018, National Labor Medal
- November 22, 2019 Member of the Chinese Academy of Engineering (CAE)
