= Sapaga-Peulh =

- Country: Burkina Faso
- Region: Plateau-Central Region
- Province: Ganzourgou
- Department: Zorgho Department

Population (2019)
  - Total: 887

Sapaga-Peulh is a village in the Zorgho Department of Ganzourgou Province in central Burkina Faso.

Population
Year	Pop.	±%
1985	369	—
2006	529	+43.4%
2019	887	+67.7%
