= Bougre =

Bougre may refer to:

Places

- Bougré, a village in central Burkina Faso
- Bougre De Zoaga, a town in south-eastern Burkina Faso
- Bougre De Youga, a town in south-eastern Burkina Faso

Literature

- Histoire de Dom Bougre, Portier des Chartreux, French novel from 1741

Terms

- Bougre, French for Bulgarian people
  - Bougre, etymological root for bugger
  - Bougres, a name for adherents of Catharism
