= Wang Jianwei (artist) =

Chinese visual artist

Wang Jianwei (Chinese: 汪建伟; pinyin: Wāng Jiànwěi) is a new media, performance, and installation artist based in Beijing, China.

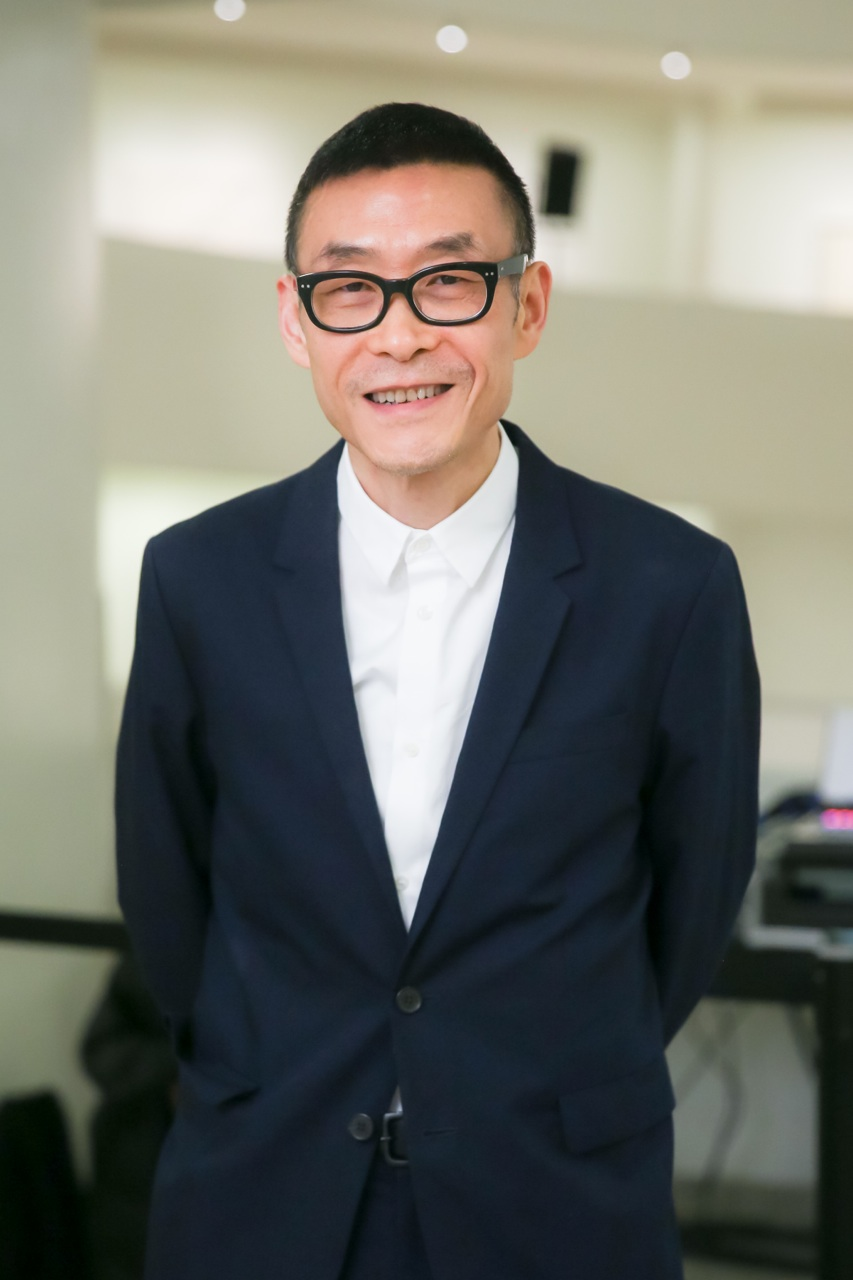
Wang Jianwei at Time Temple exhibition opening reception on October 30, 2014

== Early life and education ==
Born in Suining, Sichuan Province, China, Wang Jianwei lived in a traditional military family until 1966. Both of his parents were soldiers, and he spent his childhood in military camps, also known as budui dayuan.

In 1966, the Cultural Revolution was launched by Mao Zedong, which advocated "the abolishment of the four olds" (old ideas, old culture, old customs, and old habits). During this time, Wang was left fatherless, his father being sent to a reeducation camp/village that turned "peasants into workers." His father returned in 1974.

After graduating from high school in 1975, Wang relocated to the countryside. It was here that he took private painting classes from a local stage designer who worked for a Sichuan opera company and started to paint in realism. Also during this time, Wang began to study Russian literature and painting.

After two years of reeducation, Wang was conscripted to join the People's Liberation Army in 1977, where he served as a military engineer and operations specialist in a barrack in Qinghe County, Hebei Province, south of Beijing. He didn't produce any art during his military service.

In 1983, he met Zhu Guangyan, an army nurse, just before he was discharged. Less than a year later, they were married. After marriage, Wang and Zhu lived separately for almost seven years due to the government household registration system, known as the hukou registration system. Zhu was registered in Beijing, while Wang was linked to his parents back in Chengdu, Sichuan Province.

== Artwork and early years ==
In 1983, the military assigned Wang to work as a store manager at the Chengdu Painting Institute, Chengdu Huayuan. During this time, he was exposed to a variety of Western art styles inspiring a series of pen drawings and sketches of patrons at a local teahouse. After graduating from the Zhejiang Academy of Fine Arts, Wang produced his Tea House series (1989–1990), paintings that depict elderly residents drinking tea and passing time in local teahouses. The Tea House series was shown in a solo exhibition at the Cultural Palace of Nationalities in Beijing in 1991.

During his early years, Wang developed his signature style, employing a documentary practice of studying, observing, sketching, and interacting with his subjects. It is said his process incorporated performing a cultural study of a microsociety. His visual treatment of the passage of time and movement of the subjects resembled the work of Francis Bacon, even though he was not aware of the latter until 1990.

=== Sichuan Painting School ===
In 1983, Wang painted Dear Mother, a work that renewed the academic realist style of the Sichuan Painting School, a style developed by students of the Sichuan Fine Arts Institute, Sichuan Meishu Xueyuan. The Sichuan Painting School style focuses on details of everyday life and yielded works that were often melancholic and poetic in nature.

Dear Mother won the Gold Award in its category at the Sixth National Fine Arts Exhibition at the National Art Gallery (now National Art Museum of China) in 1984, an exhibition that included works from young academic graduates and established artists in China.

Also in 1984, Wang met his future teacher, Zheng Shengtian, who had just returned to China from the United States and brought along materials that referenced Western contemporary art. This was Wang's first exposure to installation and environmental art which had a profound impact on his later style.

=== 85 New Wave Art Movement ===
The "85 New Wave Art Movement" ("85 Xinchao meishu yundong") between 1985 and 1989 was a nationwide avant-garde movement that was stimulated by increasing contact and exchange with the contemporary international art world. In 1985, the National Art Gallery hosted the Rauschenberg Overseas Culture Interchange project, which introduced Wang to the work of Robert Rauschenberg, an artist who had significant impact on emerging avant-garde artists and specifically on the development of installation art in China. The same year, Wang enrolled in a graduate program for oil painting at the Zhejiang Academy of Fine Arts, now China Academy of Art, in Hangzhou, Zhejiang Province; he graduated in 1987. During the graduate studies, he read many previously forbidden books on Western literature and philosophy, and was influenced by Existentialists such as Jean-Paul Sartre, Albert Camus, and Jorge Luis Borges.

Additionally, the "85 New Wave Art Movement" inspired an exhibition of new Chinese art, the 1989 China/Avant-Garde show at the National Art Gallery, which drew attention of the Chinese authorities, and helped catalyze the 1989 Tiananmen Square protest. In 1990, Wang connected with the Beijing-based art group the New Measurement Group (Xin kedu), which included Chen Shaoping, Gu Dexin, and Wang Luyan. The group shared many of Wang's perspectives in conceptual and experimental art practices and art making.

== Middle years 1990s ==
In 1992, Wang became interested in the "grey system," also known as "grey relational analysis". This system theory, introduced by the Chinese mathematician Deng Julong in 1982, provided a methodology that focused on the study of problems using partial or uncertain information. Wang created his first conceptual installation work, Document (1992), at his house. With Document, Wang aimed at activating what he termed the "grey zone," or "in-between" space, signaling predictions in a combined artistic and scientific experimental process. A year later, Wang also created Incident¬–Process, State (1993), an installation including video, text, and sculpture at the Hong Kong Arts Centre, inspired by the grey system.

Inspired by a book written by a biologist about the science of crop growth, Wang returned to the village where he received reeducation, and collaborated with a local farmer to stage a performance Circulation–Sowing and Harvesting (1993–1994).

Interested in space and language, Wang made the video Production (1997), which was characteristically representative of his earlier works that juxtapose everyday living spaces and spaces of cultural production. The work documented social interaction in selected public spaces of cultural production.

== Artwork years 2000+ ==
In 2000, Wang abandoned his documentary format to create works that integrated visual art and a new form of experimental theater: he produced Paravent (2000), a nonlinear narrative theater performance and video about rethinking history exhibited at Kunstenfestivaldesarts in Brussels and at the Brighton Fringe in Brighton, UK. This is his first multimedia performance work, and first work featuring actors.

Wang was artist-in-residence at the Walker Art Center in Minneapolis, MN in 2003, when he presented the performance and multimedia installation Movable Taste; in addition, he exhibited Living Elsewhere at the Walker as part of How Latitudes Become Forms: Art in a Global Age, an international group show that examined how the shifting perceptions of place affected contemporary art making and its absorption by the culture at large.

In 2004, Wang attended the fr:Festival d'Automne à Paris, during which he presented Ceremony (2003), a large-scale multimedia work that included theater, performance and new media, at the Centre Georges Pompidou. Ceremony explored historical interpretation and its relationship to understanding reality today, specifically in China.

Wang's project Welcome to the Desert of the Real (2010), organized by Culturescapes, Basel, employs performance, animation, theater production for film, and a five-channel video component. The work was based on a story of a teenage boy who moved from rural China to the city with his family, and became addicted to computer games. The eight performances were presented in Beijing, Zurich and Geneva, and the five-channel-video component was featured in the 11th Sharjah Biennial in 2013. This work was significant in Wang's oeuvre, as it was predicated on the performances as events and underscored his philosophy that the production of art is a constant rehearsal in which a continuous process becomes central.

Wang's artwork has appeared in international art fairs and exhibitions for over decades, with many works serving as a representation of Chinese contemporary avant-garde and installation art. He was invited to the First Gwangju Bienniale in South Korea in 1995, which was the first contemporary art biennial in Asia. In June 1997, Wang and Feng Mengbo became the first Chinese contemporary artists to participate in Documenta where Wang's Production was shown. Three years later, Wang participated in the 3rd Shanghai Biennale, which was the first Chinese biennial to include international and new-media artists in addition to traditional art forms. In the following years, Wang also joined the Twenty-Fifth São Paulo Biennial (2002) and the fiftieth Venice Biennale (2003). Exhibited works (in addition to the works above) include Reproduction (1995), My Visual Archive (2003), Flying Bird (2005), Dodge (2006), Hostage (2008), and Yellow Signal (2011).

During the last two decades, Wang was introduced to international artists, curators, collectors, including Catherine David, curator for Documenta X in 1997, and Hou Hanru, a curator at Wiener Secession in Vienna, now the Consulting Curator of the Robert H. N. Ho Family Foundation Chinese Art Initiative at the Solomon R. Guggenheim Museum in New York.

== Time Temple at the Solomon R. Guggenheim Museum ==
In 2014, Wang presented Wang Jianwei: Time Temple, the first of three commissions of The Robert H. N. Ho Family Foundation Chinese Art Initiative at the Guggenheim Museum. The initiative, which launched in 2013, was established to advance the achievements of contemporary Chinese artists and expand the discourse on contemporary Chinese art by commissioning Chinese artists to create major works that will be exhibited in the museum and enter into its permanent collection.

This exhibition examines the contact between art and social reality. His artworks consider space and time: working from the notion that the production of artwork can be a continuous rehearsal, connecting theater, visual art, and film. Wang Jianwei: Time Temple is the artist's first solo exhibition in North America. This exhibition comprises installation, painting, film, and a live theater production.

Robert Yau Chung Ho, Chairman of the Robert H. N. Ho Family Foundation, on selecting Wang for the first Chinese Art Initiative commission, "Wang Jianwei is an artist who has been deeply involved within the Chinese art community since the 1980s. He is recognized for his intelligent and thought-provoking observations of contemporary Chinese art and society. Wang was chosen to create a body of work for the first commission of The Robert H. N. Ho Family Foundation Chinese Art Initiative."

Selected Works Commissioned for "Time Temple

- Time Temple, 2014. Acrylic and oil on canvas, four panels.
- Time Temple, 2014. Acrylic and oil on canvas.
- Time Temple 1, 2014. Wood and rubber, seven parts.
- Time Temple 2, 2014. Wood, rubber, and steel, five parts.
- Time Temple 3, 2014. Wood, brass, and rubber, two parts.
- Time Temple 4, 2014. Wood and paint, two parts.
- Time Temple 5, 2014. Wood and steel, three parts.
- The Morning Time Disappeared, 2014. Film, shot in Beijing.
- Spiral Ramp Library, 2014. Performance, two parts.

== Selected solo exhibitions ==
- Wang Jianwei, Cultural Palace of Nationalities, Beijing, 1991.
- Wang Jianwei, Hong Kong Arts Centre, 1992.
- Incident-Process, State, Hong Kong Arts Centre, 1992.
- Ceremony, Institute of Contemporary Arts, London, 2003.
- Wang Jianwei: Giant Steps, 4A Centre for Contemporary Asian Art, Sydney, Australia, 2004. Traveled to Australian Experimental Art Foundation, Adelaide 2004–2005.
- Relativism: A Flying Bird Is Motionless, Chambers Fine Art, New York, 2005–2006. Traveled to Arario Gallery, Beijing, 2006.
- Dodge, Shanghai Gallery of Art, Shanghai, 2006.
- Cross Infection, Hebbel am Ufer, Berlin, 2007.
- Dilemma: Three Way Fork in the Road–Recent Works by Wang Jianwei, Chambers Fine Art, New York, 2007.
- Hostage, Zendai Museum of Modern Art, Shanghai, 2008.
- Symptom: A Large Stage Work by Wang Jianwei, OCT Contemporary Art Terminal, Shenzhen, China, 2008.
- Time-Theatre-Exhibition, Today Art Museum, Beijing, 2009.
- Wang Jianwei: Yellow Signal, Ullens Center for Contemporary Art, Beijing, 2011.
- Wang Jianwei: ...the event matured, accomplished in sight of all non-existent human outcomes, Long March Space, Beijing, 2013.
- Wang Jianwei: Time Temple, Solomon R. Guggenheim Museum, New York City, 2014–2015.

== Curated exhibition ==
- He An: What Makes Me Understand What I Know?, Ullens Center for Contemporary Art, Beijing, 2009.

== Honors and awards ==
- FCA grant, Foundation for Contemporary Arts, 2008.
- Wang Jianwei represented China in the 50rd Venice Biennale, in 2003.
