= Tamidou =

Tamidou may refer to:

- Tamidou, Zorgho, Burkina Faso
- Tamidou, Zoungou, Burkina Faso
