= Nanhang =

Nanhang (南航) may refer to:

- China Southern Airlines, a major airline in China, headquartered in Guangzhou, Guangdong
- Nanjing University of Aeronautics and Astronautics, a public university based in Nanjing, Jiangsu, China
