= Zinado =

- Location within Burkina Faso, French West Africa
- Coordinates: 12°11′N 0°40′W
- Country: Burkina Faso
- Region: Plateau-Central Region
- Province: Ganzourgou Province
- Department: Zorgho Department

Population (2019)
  - Total: 932
- Time zone: UTC+0 (GMT)

Zinado is a town in the Ganzourgou province of Burkina Faso. It is 10 kilometres (6.2 mi) from the province capital Zorgho.

Population
| Year | Pop. | ±% |
|---|---|---|
| 1985 | 380 | — |
| 2006 | 713 | +87.6% |
| 2019 | 932 | +30.7% |

== Partnership ==
Verrières-le-Buisson in France
