= Bangbily =

- Location in Burkina Faso
- Coordinates: 12°12′N 0°37′W
- Country: Burkina Faso
- Region: Plateau-Central Region
- Province: Ganzourgou
- Department: Zorgho Department

Population (2019)
  - Total: 668

Bangbily is a village in the Zorgho Department of Ganzourgou Province in central Burkina Faso.

Population
Year	Pop.	±%
2006	852	—
2019	668	−21.6%
