= Zempassogo =

- Location in Burkina Faso
- Coordinates: 12°15′N 0°44′W
- Country: Burkina Faso
- Region: Plateau-Central Region
- Province: Ganzourgou
- Department: Zorgho Department

Population (2019)
  - Total: 1,650

Zempassogo is a town in the Zorgho Department of Ganzourgou Province in central Burkina Faso.

Population
Year	Pop.	±%
2006	1,185	—
2019	1,650	+39.2%
