= Z11 =

Z11 may refer to:

- Changhe Z-11, a light utility helicopter
- German destroyer Z11 Bernd von Arnim, a Type 1934A destroyer built for the German Navy in the late 1930s
- GN-z11, a high-redshift galaxy that used to be the furthest known
- Small nucleolar RNA snR61/Z1/Z11, a non-coding RNA molecule
- Z11 (computer), the first serially-produced computer of the Zuse KG
