= Torodo =

- Location in Burkina Faso
- Coordinates: 12°12′N 0°29′W
- Country: Burkina Faso
- Region: Plateau-Central Region
- Province: Ganzourgou
- Department: Zorgho Department

Population (2019)
  - Total: 1,641

Torodo is a town in the Zorgho Department of Ganzourgou Province in central Burkina Faso.

Population
Year	Pop.	±%
1985	1,327	—
2006	2,024	+52.5%
2019	1,641	−18.9%
