= Souka, Burkina Faso =

Souka
- Location in Burkina Faso
- Coordinates: 12°16′N 0°31′W
- Country: Burkina Faso
- Region: Plateau-Central Region
- Province: Ganzourgou
- Department: Zorgho Department

Population (2019)
  - Total: 1,316

Souka is a village in the Zorgho Department of Ganzourgou Province in central Burkina Faso.

Population
Year	Pop.	±%
1985	652	—
2006	990	+51.8%
2019	1,316	+32.9%
