= Tuiré-Peulh =

- Country: Burkina Faso
- Region: Plateau-Central Region
- Province: Ganzourgou
- Department: Zorgho Department

Population (2019)
  - Total: 167

Tuiré-Peulh is a village in the Zorgho Department of Ganzourgou Province in central Burkina Faso.

Population
Year	Pop.	±%
1985	76	—
2006	49	−35.5%
2019	167	+240.8%
