= Gonkin =

Gonkin Gonckin
- Location in Burkina Faso
- Coordinates: 12°15′N 0°34′W
- Country: Burkina Faso
- Region: Plateau-Central Region
- Province: Ganzourgou
- Department: Zorgho Department

Population (2019)
  - Total: 472

Gonkin is a village in the Zorgho Department of Ganzourgou Province in central Burkina Faso.

Population
Year	Pop.	±%
1985	218	—
2006	171	−21.6%
2019	472	+176.0%
