= Sapaga =

Coordinates: 12°11′N 0°26′W

- Interactive map of Sapaga
- Country: Burkina Faso
- Region: Plateau-Central Region
- Province: Ganzourgou
- Department: Zorgho Department

Population (2019)
  - Total: 5,717

Sapaga is a village in the Zorgho Department of Ganzourgou Province in central Burkina Faso.

Population
Year	Pop.	±%
1985	2,850	—
2006	2,603	−8.7%
2019	5,717	+119.6%
