= Deng Julong =

Deng Julong (Chinese: 邓聚龙; January 1933 – June 22, 2013) was a professor of Huazhong University of Science and Technology, Wuhan, China. He is acknowledged as the founder of grey system theory, first proposed in 1982 with the publication of his paper "Control problems of grey systems," in the international journal Systems and Control Letter, edited at the time by Roger W. Brockett, a professor at Harvard University. This theory underlies the theory of grey relational analysis. His theory inspired many noted scholars like Jeffrey Yi-Lin Forrest, Liu Sifeng, Wang Jianwei, and Keith W. Hipel, recipient of Izaak Walton Killam Memorial Prize.

== Academic career ==
The works of Professor Lotfi A. Zadeh significantly inspired Deng, and the uncertainty of the Deng Xiaoping era inspired him to work on uncertain systems.

In 1965, he proposed the theory of multivariate system control. His academic paper, "an integrated approach to the parallel calibration of multivariate linear systems", was published in Acta Automatica (Volume 3, Issue 1), a journal by Chinese Association of Automation and the Institute of Automation, Chinese Academy of Sciences, which was later summarized by the Academy of Sciences of the Soviet Union at the time. He had been to Aerospace Valley (France), University of Maryland (USA), National Central University (Taiwan) and Tatung University (Taiwan) for delivering lectures on grey system theory.

His works have been cited by more than 30,000 times, according to CNKI database. His highly cited paper, his first paper on grey systems, received more than 3500 citations till February 2019, according to Google Scholar.

He was the founding editor-in-chief of The Journal of Grey System, an SCIE journal indexed by Clarivate, and served it for 24 years.

In Deng's "academic career of 60 years, there existed neither holidays, weekends nor a line between service and retirement," says one of his former students.

== Recognition ==
He was honored at the 2011 congress of the World Organisation of Systems and Cybernetics by the award of an Honorary Fellowship.

On September 7, 2019, German Chancellor Angela Merkel visited Wuhan and delivered a speech at the Huazhong University of Science and Technology. In her speech, Merkel highlighted the influence of grey system theory and its pioneers. In her speech, she said that the works of Professor Deng, the founder of grey system theory, and Professor Liu Sifeng, "have made a profound impact on the world."

== Death ==
He was born in Lianyuan, Hunan. He died at the age of 80 in China.
