= Wu Guanghui =

Chinese aircraft engineer

- 吴光辉
- Born: 7 February 1960 (age 66); Wuhan, Hubei, China
- Education: Nanjing University of Aeronautics and Astronautics; Beijing University of Aeronautics and Astronautics
- Scientific career
- Fields: Aircraft design
- Workplaces: Commercial Aircraft Corporation of China Ltd

Chinese name
- Simplified Chinese: 吴光辉
- Traditional Chinese: 吳光輝
Transcriptions
Standard Mandarin
- Hanyu Pinyin: Wú Guānghuī

Wu Guanghui (born 7 February 1960) is a Chinese engineer specializing in aircraft design, currently serving as deputy general manager of the Commercial Aircraft Corporation of China Ltd. He is an academician of the Chinese Academy of Engineering (CAE).

== Biography ==
Wu was born in Wuhan, Hubei, on 7 February 1960. During the Down to the Countryside Movement, he became a sent-down youth in Caidian District. In 1978, he was admitted to Nanjing University of Aeronautics and Astronautics, majoring in aircraft design.

After graduating in 1982, he was dispatched to the 603rd Institute of Ministry of Aeronautics Industry, where he successively as a designer, deputy director, and director. In March 2008, he was promoted to deputy general manager of the Commercial Aircraft Corporation of China Ltd and chief designer of C919 passenger aircraft.

He was a representative of the 17th National Congress of the Chinese Communist Party. He was a member of the 11th and 12th National Committee of the Chinese People's Political Consultative Conference. He is a delegate to the 13th National People's Congress.

== Honors and awards ==
- 2010 State Science and Technology Progress Award (Special Prize)
- 2011 National Labor Medal
- 2013 Feng Ru Aviation Technology Elite Award
- 2015 Special Government Subsidy of the State Council
- 27 November 2017 Member of the Chinese Academy of Engineering (CAE)
