= Koubéogo, Ganzourgou =

Koubéogo
- Country: Burkina Faso
- Region: Plateau-Central Region
- Province: Ganzourgou
- Department: Zorgho Department

Population (2019)
  - Total: 794

Koubéogo is a village in the Zorgho Department of Ganzourgou Province in central Burkina Faso.

Population
Year	Pop.	±%
2006	593	—
2019	794	+33.9%
