= Tuiré =

- Location in Burkina Faso
- Coordinates: 12°13′N 0°30′W
- Country: Burkina Faso
- Region: Plateau-Central Region
- Province: Ganzourgou
- Department: Zorgho Department

Population (2019)
  - Total: 2,765

Tuiré (or Touiré) is a town in the Zorgho Department of Ganzourgou Province in central Burkina Faso.

Population
Year	Pop.	±%
1985	1,356	—
2006	1,944	+43.4%
2019	2,765	+42.2%
