= GRA =

GRA or Gra may refer to:

== Government and politics ==
- Gender Recognition Act 2004, a British act of law
- Genootskap van Regte Afrikaners ("Society of Real Afrikaners"), which promoted Afrikaner culture and language
- Ghana Revenue Authority
- Gibraltar Regulatory Authority
- Gobabis Residents' Association, a political party in Namibia
- General Resources Account, principal account of the IMF

== Transportation ==
- Granby station, in Colorado, United States
- Grande Raccordo Anulare, a highway in Rome, Italy
- Grantham railway station, England (National Rail station code GRA)

== Other uses ==
- Garda Representative Association, a statutory representative body for Irish police officers
- Georgia Research Alliance, an American non-profit organization
- Girls Rodeo Association, now the Women's Professional Rodeo Association
- Glucocorticoid remediable aldosteronism
- Grey relational analysis
- Greyhound Racing Association
- Vilna Gaon (1720–1797), Polish-Lithuanian Jewish scholar, referred to as the Gra
