= Jeffrey Yi-Lin Forrest =

Yi Lin (Chinese: 林益; born 1959), also known as Jeffrey Forrest and Jeffrey Yi-Lin Forrest, is a professor of mathematics, systems science, economics, and finance at Pennsylvania State System of Higher Education (Slippery Rock campus) (SSHE) and at several major universities in China. Lin has been an active researcher in the field of systems science since mid-1980s and serves as the founder and president of the International Institute for General Systems Studies (IIGSS).

== Biography ==
Yi Lin was born in Fuzhou, Fujian, People's Republic of China, in 1959. He earned his BS degree in pure mathematics and an MS degree in general topology from Northwest University, Xi'an, respectively in 1982 and 1984. During 1985–1988, he pursued his PhD degree study under the supervision of Ben Fitzpatrick of Auburn University, Alabama, and earned his PhD degree in 1988. In 1990–1991, he did one year post-doctoral study in statistics under the guidance of Stephen Fienberg at Carnegie Mellon University, Pittsburgh.

From 1988 to 1992, Lin was an assistant professor, from 1992 to 2002, associate professor, from 2002 on, a professor in mathematics at SSHE (Slippery Rock campus). He was a visiting professor of the GMD Institute for Computer Architecture and Software Technology of the German National Research Center for Information Technology during the summer of 1997. Lin served as a guest professor at the Institute of Systems Engineering and Management Science, Henan Agricultural University, Zhengzhou, from 1997 to 2002; an adjunct professor at Hebei University of Economics and Trade since 1998, Shijiazhuang; visiting professor at Huazhong University of Science and Technology, Wuhan, from 2001 to 2004; honorary advisor of Chongqing Contemporary Research Institute of Systems Sciences, from 2004–2006; guest professor and a PhD program supervisor at College of Economics and Management, 2000–present, and executive president of the Institute for Grey Systems Studies, 2008–present, Nanjing University of Aeronautics and Astronautics; specially appointed professor at Department of Mathematics and Systems Science, National University of Defense Technology, Changsha, 2009–2011. Since 2009, Lin has served on the board of directors of the World Organization of Cybernetics and Systems.

Lin has lectured globally and organized various large scale projects involving scholars from over 80 countries and geographic regions representing over 50 different scientific disciplines. He was a founder of the International Institute for General Systems Studies (IIGSS), and has served as its president since its inception in 1993. Since 2008, Lin has been editor of the book series, entitled "Systems Evaluation, Prediction and Decision-Making," published by the CRC Press of Taylor and Francis Group. In 1999, Lin was recognized with Norbert Wiener Award for the most outstanding paper in the 1998 volume of Kybernetes. In 2002, Lin's joint work was selected by Literati Club as one highly commended paper for the year of 2001. In 2002, Lin's joint paper was judged by the Award Committee of the World Organization of Cybernetics and Systems as a best paper at the 12th International Congress of the WOSC. In that same year, Lin was inducted into the Honorary Fellowship of the WOCS.

Lin is married with three children. His family resides in Grove City, Pennsylvania.

== Work ==
Lin's research interests cover a wide range of topics from data analysis to laws of conservation, from the elementary structure of the universe to mysteries of the family, from the laws underlying civilizations to the natural endowments of man. Even so, most of his works appeared in the areas of systems theory and applications, mathematical and systems modeling, and foundations of mathematics.

=== Systems research ===
Since mid 1980s, Lin studied the general theory of multi-relational systems under the influence of George Jiří Klir, Mihajlo D. Mesarovic, and Yasuhiko Takahara, and applied the theory to a diverse array of scientific areas, including public health, sociology, materials science, and others. His work in this area was treated as representative of mathematical systems theory. Since 1995, in the name of the IIGSS, Lin has organized regular international and national conferences on systems research and applications.

=== Blown-up theory ===
Continuing his works on the chaos of general systems, starting in 1995, Lin joined hands with Shoucheng OuYang in establishing a theory about transitional changes naturally existing in evolutions of materials and events in the hope of producing more accurate forecasts for disastrous weather conditions. When Lin's edited volume "Mystery of Nonlinearity and Lorenz's Chaos" was published in 1998, over one thousand correspondences from various scholars were received within the following year. Works along this line have been practically employed in day-to-day weather forecasts of several stations in China.

=== Grey systems theory ===
Starting in early 1997, Lin collaborated with Sifeng Liu on their works of a new theory of data analysis for partially known and partially unknown systems. This theory was initially founded by Julong Deng of Huazhong University of Science and Technology, Wuhan, in 1982 with the publication of his paper "Control problems of grey systems," in the international journal Systems and Control Letter, edited at the time by Roger W. Brockett. In 2007, they founded the Institute for Grey Systems Studies at Nanjing University of Aeronautics and Astronautics and started an IEEE conference series, named "IEEE International Conference on Grey Systems and intelligent Services," in 2007.

=== Crises in foundations of mathematics ===
With an invitation from Ronald Mickens in 1987, Lin, along with Wendell Holladay (Vanderbilt University), Saunders Mac Lane (University of Chicago), John Polkinghorne (Cambridge, UK), and others, expressed his opinions from the angle of systems research on Nobel laureate Eugene P. Wigner's assertion about "the unreasonable effectiveness of mathematics." Continuing this work, Lin (with a colleague) addressed the problem of knowability of the physical world in 1997. Then in 2008 Lin guest edited a special volume of the international journal Kybernetes on the fourth crisis in the foundations of mathematics along with technical explanations on why the 2nd and the 3rd crises were not resolved as believed in history.

=== The systemic yoyo model ===
Continuing his joint works of 1998 and 2002, in 2008 Lin officially proposed a new model, the systemic yoyo, for the general system, hoping that this model could play a role in systems research as that of the points of Euclidean spaces in modern science. It is found that this model can be readily applied to study structures and organizations from diverse areas.

=== Evolution science ===
Based on his works in blown-up theory, predictions of disastrous weather conditions, and systems modeling, Lin, Shoucheng OuYang, and other members of their research center on blown-ups theory, studied why modern science did not appear in China, why such theories as calculus have become extremely successful, while predicting (near) zero probability disastrous weathers is still practically impossible. After pointing out the limitations of modern science, Lin, along with colleagues, proposed how post-modern science would look like after first addressing what time is.

In this article, all the references [2]–[11], [14], [16], [17] represent independent, third party, fact-checking sources.

== Publications ==
Yi Lin has published over three hundred research papers and over thirty monographs, and he has edited special topic volumes.

=== Selected books and edited volumes ===
- 2010. Yi Lin and Shoucheng OuYang. Irregularities and Prediction of Major Disasters, CRC Press.
- 2008. Yi Lin. Systemic Yoyos: Some Impacts of the Second Dimension, Taylor and Francis.
- 2008. Yi Lin (guest editor). Systematic Studies: The Infinity Problem in Modern

Mathematics. Kybernetes: The International Journal of Systems, Cybernetics, and Management Science, vol. 37, no. 3–4, pp. 387–578.

- 2006. Sifeng Liu and Yi Lin. Grey Information: Theory and Practical Applications. Springer.
- 2003. Xiangjun Feng, Paul B. Gibson and Yi Lin (guest editors). Some New Theories about Time and Space. Kybernetes: The International Journal of Systems and Cybernetics, vol. 32, nos. 7/8, pp. 933–1202.
- 2002. Yong Wu and Yi Lin. Beyond Nonstructural Quantitative Analysis: Blown-Ups, Spinning Currents and the Modern Science. World Scientific.
- 1999. Yi Lin. General Systems Theory: A Mathematical Approach. Kluwer Academic and Plenum Publishers.
- 1998. Yi Lin (Guest Editor). Mystery of Nonlinearity and Lorenz’s Chaos. A special double issue of Kybernetes: The International Journal of Systems and Cybernetics, vol. 27, nos. 6 & 7. pp. 605–854.

=== Selected papers ===
- 2010. Yi Lin and Bailey Forrest. The state of a civilization. Kybernetes: The International Journal of Cybernetics, Systems and Management Science, vol. 39, no. 2, pp. 343–356.
- 2009. Yi Lin and Dongyun Yi. Yoyo structures of general systems and Newton’s laws of motion. Journal of Air Force Engineering University (Natural Science Edition), vol. 10, no. 5, pp. 70–75.
- 2009. Yonghong Hao, Yajie Wang, Yuen Zhu, Yi Lin, Jet-Chau Wen, Tian-Chyi J. Yeh. Response to Karst springs to climate change and anthropogenic activities: The Niangziyuan Springs, China. Progress in Physical Geography, vol. 33(5) pp. 634–649.
- 2008. Yi Lin and Dillon Forrest. Economic yoyos and Becker’s Rotten Kid Theorem. Kybernetes: The International Journal of Systems and Cybernetics, vol. 37, no. 2, pp. 297–314.
- 2008. Yi Lin and Jesus Valencia. Grey analysis of Colombian migration. The Journal of Grey Systems, vol. 20, no. 1, pp. 5–20.
- 2008. Yi Lin, Wujia Zhu, Ningsheng Gong, and Guoping Du. Systemic Yoyo Structure in Human Thoughts and the Fourth Crisis in Mathematics. Kybernetes: The International Journal of Systems and Cybernetics, vol. 37, no. ¾, pp. 387–423.
- 2007. Yi Lin. Systemic yoyo model and applications in Newton’s, Kepler’s Laws, etc. Kybernetes: The International Journal of Systems and Cybernetics, vol. 36, no. 3/4, pp. 484–516.
- 2006. Yi Lin and Sifeng Liu. Solving Problems with incomplete information: a grey systems approach. Advances in Imaging and Electron Physics, published by Elsevier, Oxford, UK. Vol. 141, pp. 77–174.
- 2003. Yi Lin. Some recent progresses in applied mathematics (II). J. of Pure and Applied Mathematics, vol. 19, no. 1, pp. 5–11.
- 2002. K. D. Liu, Yi Lin and L. G. Gao. Unascertained rationals and subjective uncertain information. Systems Analysis Modelling Simulation, vol. 42, pp. 343–358.
- 2002. Yi Lin, R. DeNu and N. Patel. True distance fit of exponential curves and tests of applications. International J. of Applied Mathematics, vol. 9, no. 1, pp. 49–68.
- 2001. Yi Lin. Differential and integral calculus on discrete time series data. Proceedings of the 14th International Conference on Systems Science, Volume I: Plenary and Invited Papers: Systems Theory and Control Theory, pp. 123–131. Also, Systems Science, vol. 27, no. 3, pp. 49–58.
- 2001. S. C. OuYang, Yi Lin, Y. Wu, T-G. Xiao. Physics properties of Schrödinger equation and excessive expansion of the concept of wave motion. Advances in Systems Science and Applications, vol. 1, pp. 112–116.
- 2000. S. C. OuYang, Yi Lin and Y. Wu. Prediction of Natural Disasters. International Journal of General Systems, vol. 29, pp. 897–912.
- 2000. Yi Lin, S. F. Liu. Regional economic planning based on systemic analysis of small samples. Problems of Nonlinear Analysis in Engineering Systems, vol. 6, no. 11, pp. 33–49.
- 2000. Yi Lin, S. F. Liu. Law of exponentiality and exponential curve fitting. Systems Analysis Modelling Simulation, vol. 38, pp. 621–636.
- 1999. Yi Lin and S. F. Liu. Several programming models with unascertained parameters and their applications. Multi-Criteria Decision Analysis, vol. 8, pp. 206–220.
- 1999. T. G. Xiao, Y. Lin and S. C. OuYang. Predictability of atmospheric eddy motions and reversal changes in systems evolution. Systems Science, vol. 25, no. 1, pp. 110–124.
- 1998. Yi Lin. Discontinuity: a weakness of calculus and beginning of a new era. Kybernetes: The International Journal of Systems and Cybernetics, vol. 27, nos. 6 & 7, pp. 614–618.
- 1998. Yi Lin and S-T. Wang. Developing a mathematical theory of computability which speaks the language of levels. Mathematical and Computer Modeling: An International Journal, vol. 27, no. 6, pp. 23–32.
- 1998. Z. Q. Ren, Yi Lin, and S. C. OuYang. Conjecture on law of conservation of informational infrastructure. Kybernetes: The International Journal of Systems and Cybernetics, vol. 27, nos. 4 and 5, pp. 543–552.

== External links and sources ==
- http://www.iigss.net/
- https://web.archive.org/web/20110716073617/http://www.crcpress.com/ecommerce_product/book_series.jsf?series_id=2156
- https://web.archive.org/web/20071102071335/http://assa.iigss.net/
- Jeffrey Yi-Lin Forrest publications indexed by Google Scholar
