= Wang Jianwei =

Wang Jianwei, may refer to:

- Wang Jianwei (general) (born 1954), a lieutenant general in the Chinese People's Liberation Army
- Wang Jianwei (artist), Chinese artist
