= Joseph L. Badaracco =

American author

Joseph L. Badaracco is an American author, and the John Shad Professor of Business Ethics at Harvard Business School. He has taught courses on business ethics, strategy and management in the School's MBA and executive programs.

== Career ==
Badaracco was born in 1948, and is a graduate of St. Louis University, Oxford University, where he was a Rhodes Scholar, and Harvard Business School, where he earned an MBA and a DBA. He is married to professor Patricia O'Brien.

=== Recent work ===
In recent years, Professor Badaracco served as Chair of the MBA Program and as Housemaster of Currier House in Harvard College. He has also been chairman of the Harvard University Advisory Committee on Shareholder Responsibility and has served on the boards of two public companies. Badaracco has taught in executive programs in the United States, Japan, and many other countries and has spoken to a wide variety of organizations on issues of leadership, values, and ethics. He is also the faculty chair of the Nomura School of Advanced Management in Tokyo.

=== Other work ===
He is also the faculty chair of the Nomura School of Advanced Management in Tokyo, is a former chair of the Harvard University Advisory Committee on Shareholder Responsibility, and has served on boards of public companies. The book "Managing in the Gray" was inspired by the Chinese philosophy, Grey system theory.

== Published works ==
- The Knowledge Link: How Firms Compete Through Strategic Alliances, Harvard Business School Press (1991) ISBN 0-8758-4226-7
- Leadership and the Quest for Integrity (with Richard R. Ellsworth), Harvard Business School Press (1993) ISBN 0-8758-4200-3
- Business Ethics: Roles and Responsibilities, Irwin (1995) ISBN 0-256-14946-1
- Defining Moments: When Managers Must Choose Between Right and Right, Harvard Business School Press (1997) ISBN 0-8758-4803-6
- Leading Quietly: An Unorthodox Guide to Doing the Right Thing, Harvard Business School Press (2002) ISBN 1-57851-487-8
- Questions of Character: Illuminating the Heart of Leadership Through Literature, Harvard Business School Press (2006) ISBN 1-59139-968-8
- Managing in the Gray: 5 Timeless Questions for Resolving Your Toughest Problems at Work, Harvard Business Review Press (2016) ISBN 1-6336-9174-8
