= Nabitenga =

- Location in Burkina Faso
- Coordinates: 12°19′N 0°35′W
- Country: Burkina Faso
- Region: Plateau-Central Region
- Province: Ganzourgou
- Department: Zorgho Department

Population (2019)
  - Total: 1,419

Nabitenga is a village in the Zorgho Department of Ganzourgou Province in central Burkina Faso.

Population
Year	Pop.	±%
1985	1,028	—
2006	1,002	−2.5%
2019	1,419	+41.6%
