= Kologuessom =

Village in central Burkina Faso

- Country: Burkina Faso
- Region: Plateau-Central Region
- Province: Ganzourgou
- Department: Zorgho Department

Population (2019)
  - Total: 892

Kologuessom is a village in the Zorgho Department of Ganzourgou Province in central Burkina Faso.

Population
| Year | Pop. | ±% |
|---|---|---|
| 2006 | 647 | — |
| 2019 | 892 | +37.9% |
