= Kourgou =

- Location in Burkina Faso
- Coordinates: 12°20′N 0°46′W
- Country: Burkina Faso
- Region: Plateau-Central Region
- Province: Ganzourgou
- Department: Zorgho Department

Population (2019)
  - Total: 545

Kourgou is a village in the Zorgho Department of Ganzourgou Province in central Burkina Faso.

Population
Year	Pop.	±%
1985	361	—
2006	281	−22.2%
2019	545	+94.0%
