= Dabèga =

- Location in Burkina Faso
- Coordinates: 12°17′N 0°35′W
- Country: Burkina Faso
- Region: Plateau-Central Region
- Province: Ganzourgou
- Department: Zorgho Department

Population (2019)
  - Total: 817

Dabèga is a village located in the Zorgho Department of Ganzourgou Province in central Burkina Faso.

Population
Year	Pop.	±%
2006	606	—
2019	817	+34.8%
