= Bissiga, Ganzourgou =

Bissiga
- Country: Burkina Faso
- Region: Plateau-Central Region
- Province: Ganzourgou
- Department: Zorgho Department

Population (2019)
  - Total: 1,672

Bissiga is a town in the Zorgho Department of Ganzourgou Province in central Burkina Faso.

Population
Year	Pop.	±%
1985	975	—
2006	1,058	+8.5%
2019	1,672	+58.0%
