= Yougoulmandé =

- Location in Burkina Faso
- Coordinates: 12°18′N 0°43′W
- Country: Burkina Faso
- Region: Plateau-Central Region
- Province: Ganzourgou
- Department: Zorgho Department

Population (2019)
  - Total: 839

Yougoulmandé (or Yougoul Mandé) is a village in the Zorgho Department of Ganzourgou Province in central Burkina Faso.

Population
Year	Pop.	±%
1985	445	—
2006	661	+48.5%
2019	839	+26.9%
