= Douré, Zorgho =

Douré
- Location in Burkina Faso
- Coordinates: 12°12′N 0°29′W
- Country: Burkina Faso
- Region: Plateau-Central Region
- Province: Ganzourgou
- Department: Zorgho Department

Population (2019)
  - Total: 1,187

Douré is a village in the Zorgho Department of Ganzourgou Province in central Burkina Faso.

Population
Year	Pop.	±%
1985	383	—
2006	741	+93.5%
2019	1,187	+60.2%
