= Digras, Beed =

Village in Maharashtra, India

Digras
- Village
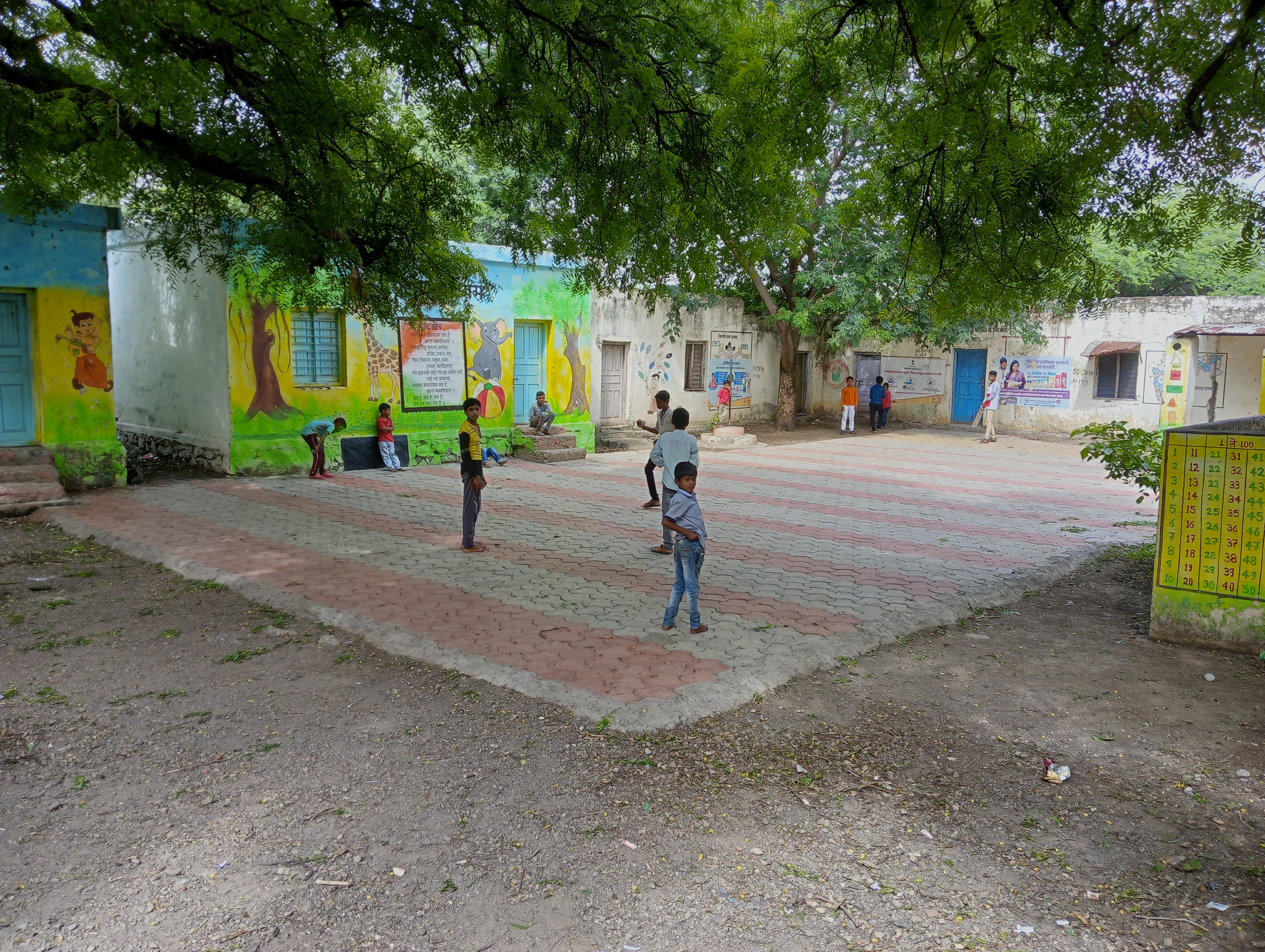
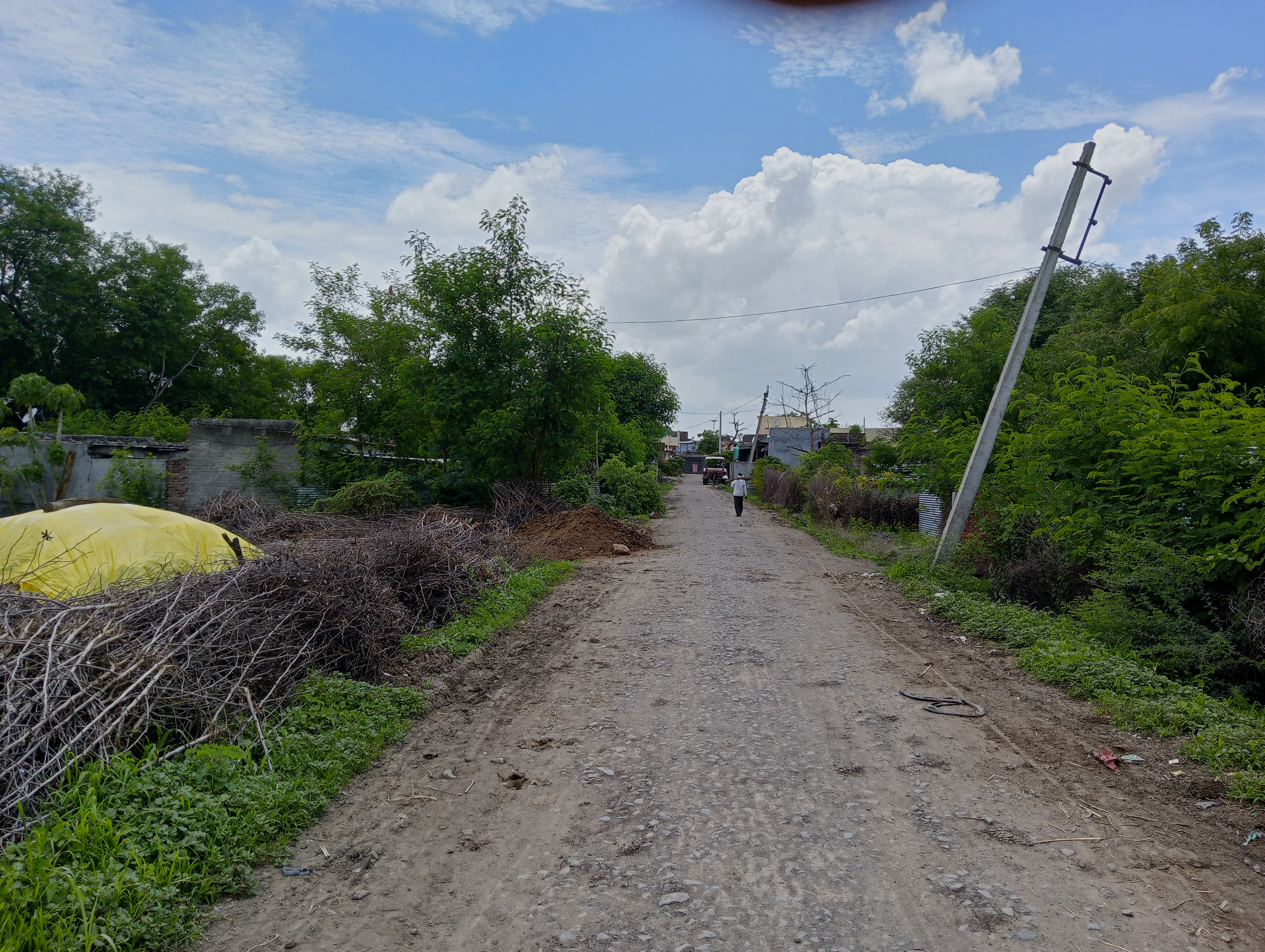
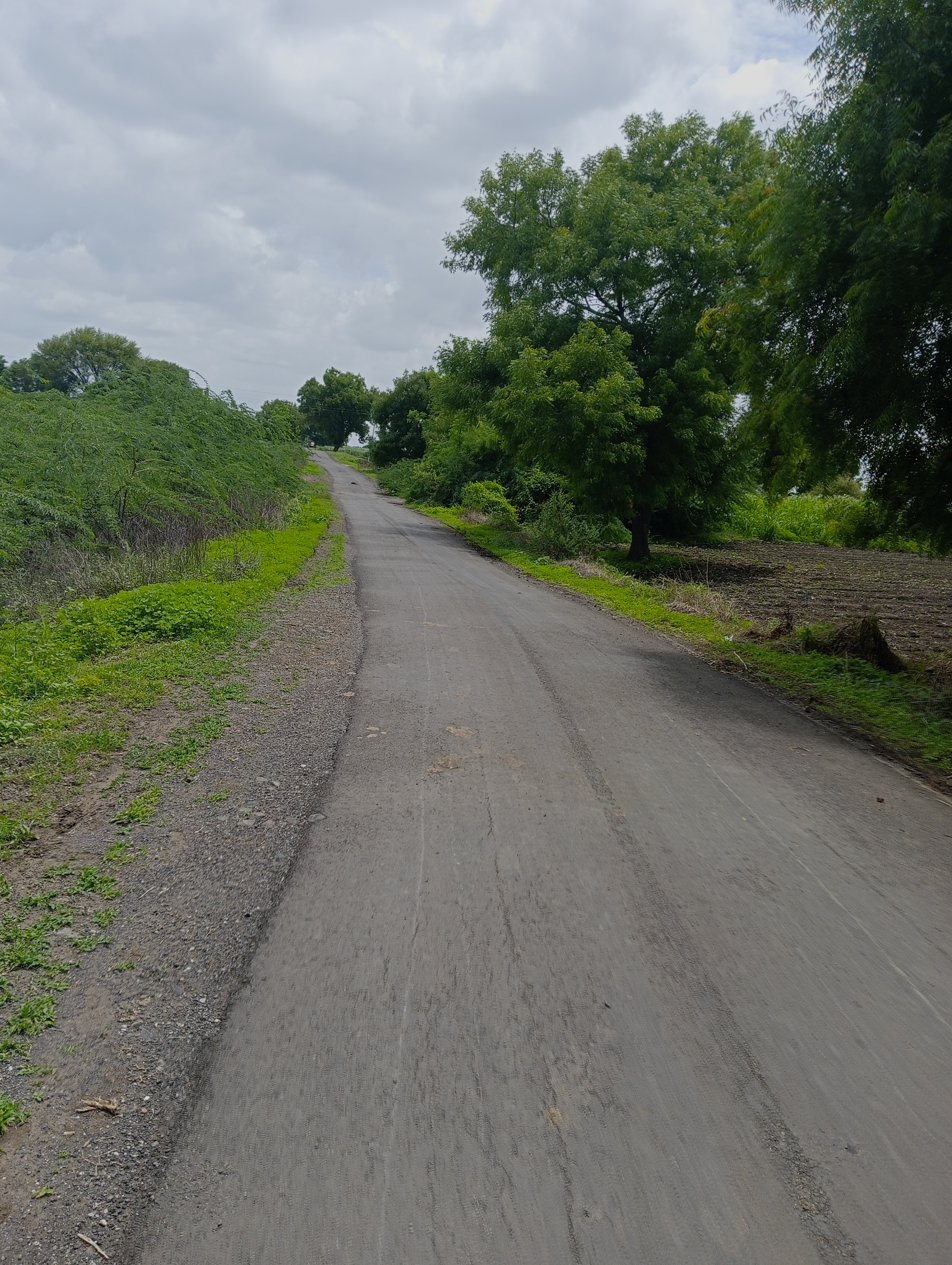
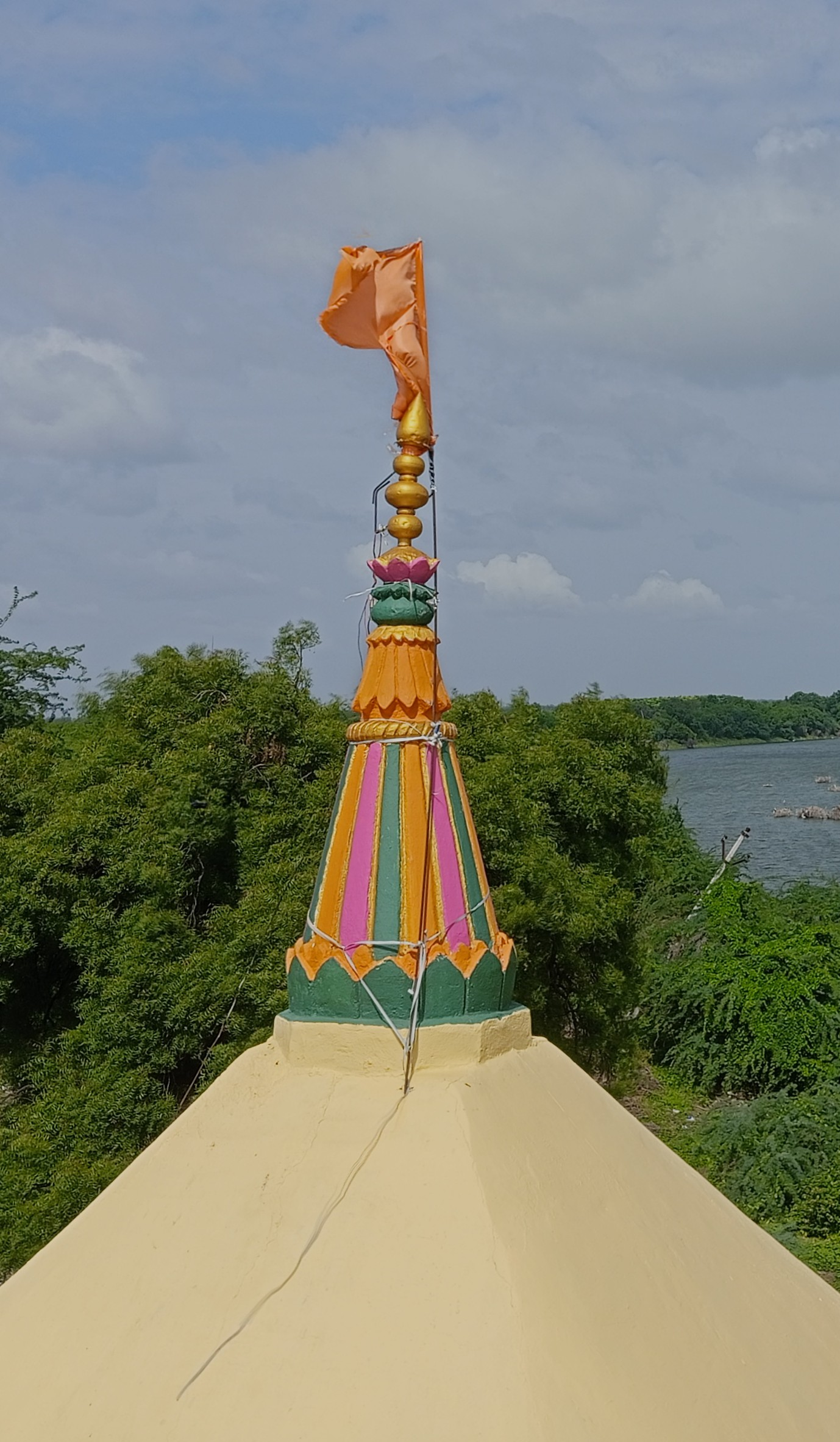
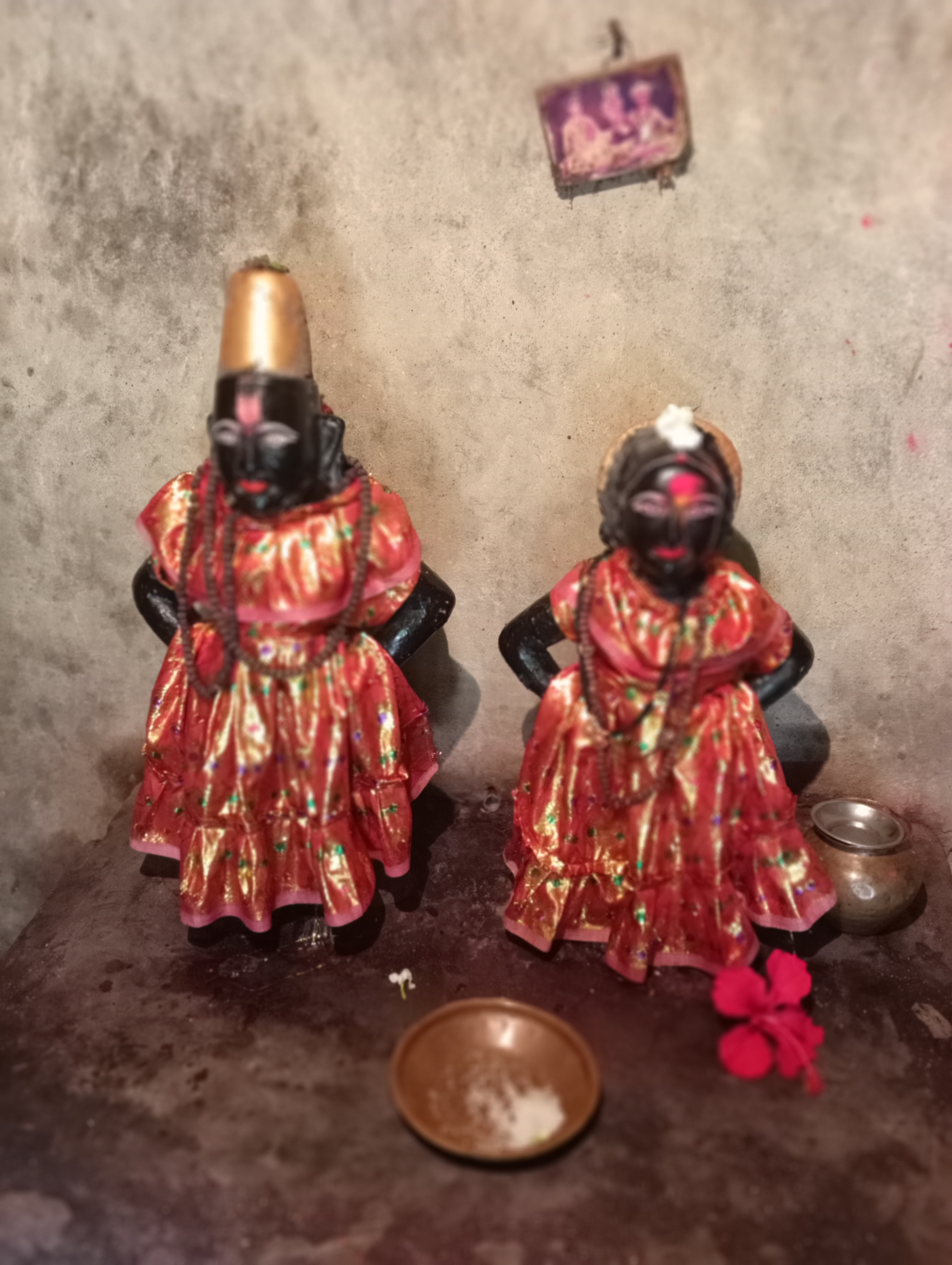
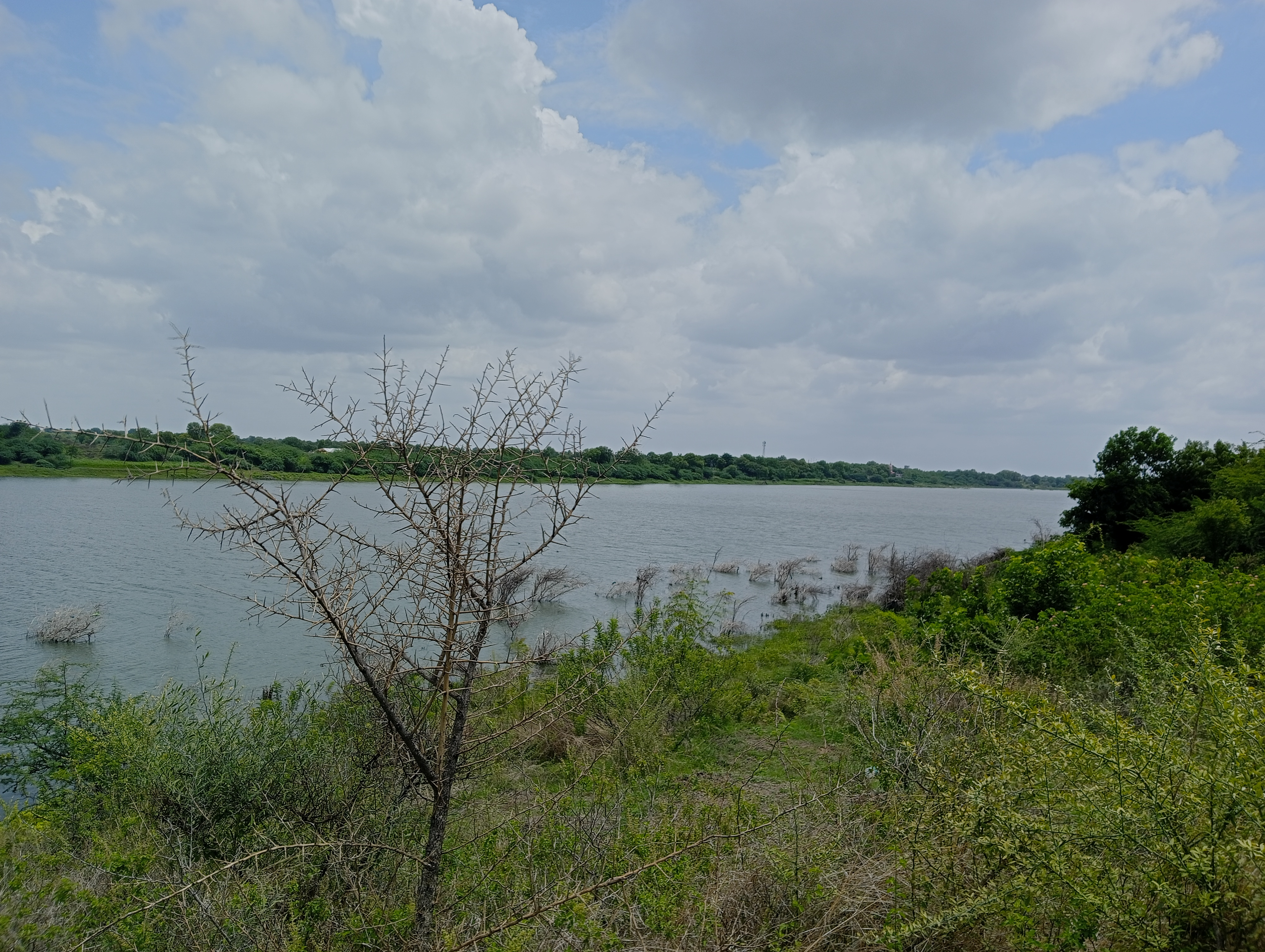
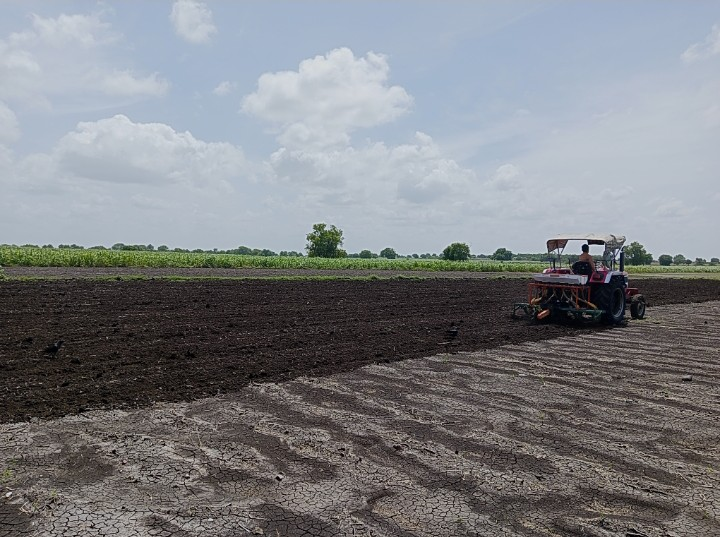
- From left to right: Zilla Parishad Prathmik Shala, Main Road, Khatgavhan road, Kalash of the Kalinka Devi temple, Idol of Vitthal and Rukmini, Godavari River, Ploughing by Tractor
- Nickname: Deviche Digras (Note: Deviche Digras is Digras of Goddess Kalinka Devi in Marathi.)
- Location in Maharashtra Digras (India) Digras (Asia)
- Coordinates: 19°06′01.3″N 76°21′13.8″E
- Country: India
- State: Maharashtra
- Region: Marathwada
- District: Beed
- Taluka: Parli Vaijnath

Government
  - Type: Grampanchayat
  - Body: Digras Gram Panchayat
  - Sarpanch: Komal Atul Muthal

Area
  - Total: 4.12 km^{2} (1.59 sq mi)

Population (2011)
  - Total: 1,106
- Demonym: Digraskar

Language
  - Official: Marathi
- Time zone: UTC+5:30 (IST)
- Pin code: 431128
- Vehicle registration: MH44; MH23
- Literacy rate: 65%
- Public transit access: Parli Vaijnath (40 km); Latur (116.4 km); Mumbai (443 km)

Digras is a village situated on the banks of the Godavari River in Parli Taluka of Beed district. The village is a pilgrimage site for the Kasar community in Maharashtra as there is a temple of Kalinka Devi, the Kuladevata of the Kasar's.

== Location ==
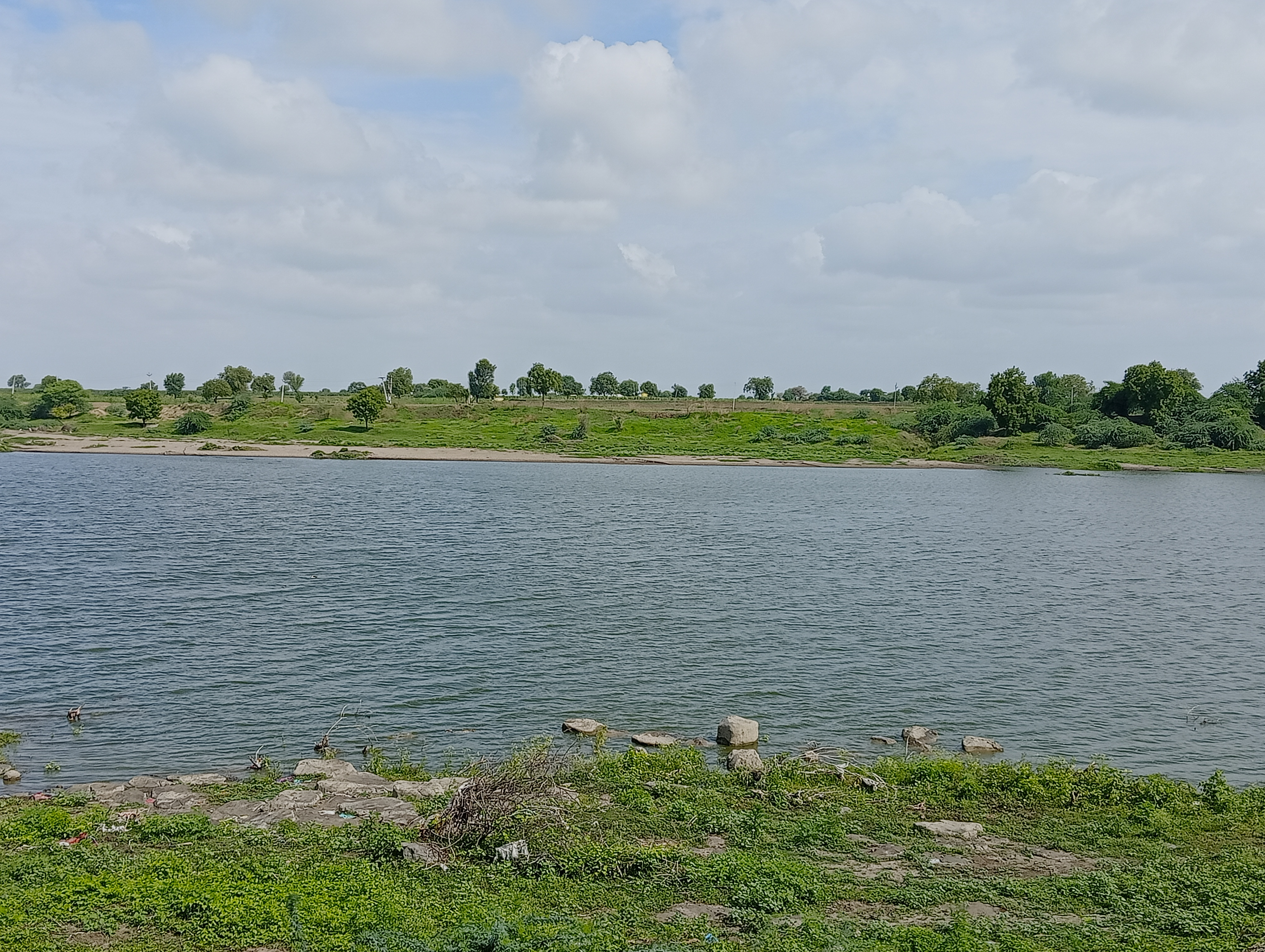
Godavari River

Digras is situated on the banks of the Godavari River in the north–eastern part of Beed district, which shares a border with Parbhani district.

== Administration ==
As per the Constitution of India and Panchayat Raj Act, Digras village is administered by Sarpanch under Parli Vaijnath Panchayat Samiti and Beed Zilla Parishad.

== Education ==
The Zilla Parishad Prathmik Shala (transl. District Council Primary School) is the sole educational institution in the village run by Zilla parishad, Beed and it only offers instruction up to the fourth grade.

== Demographics ==
According to the 2011 census of India, there are 1106 people living in the village.

Indiacator	Total	Male	Female
Households	258	—N/a	—N/a
Population	1106	578	528
0–6 aged	165	91	74
Scheduled castes	350	176	174
Scheduled tribes	3	1	2
Literacy	720	423	297
Illiteracy	386	155	231
Working population	548	321	227
Main working population	540	320	220
Main cultivator population	159	104	55
Main Agricultural labourers	332	177	155
Main households industries	3	3	0
Main other working population	46	36	10
Marginal working population	8	1	7
Non–working population	558	257	301

== Illegal sand mining ==
In 2022, Harshad Kamble of the District Mining Office addressed the need for authorized sand mining to prevent illegal activities and road damage during a public hearing on sand mining in the Godavari river. He also raised concerns about water levels affecting mining operations. Local residents expressed concerns about road damage, traffic congestion, and environmental issues due to illegal sand transport, and called for the removal of sand jetty from the auction.

In 2023, Assistant Superintendent of Sirsala Police, Pankaj Kumawat, conducted a raid at the Godavari river basin at around 1:30 am on 4 April. A tractor being used to illegally extract and smuggle sand from the river basin was seized, along with a two-wheeler used for identifying the location. The tractor driver and others involved were arrested during the operation.
