= Kidiba =

- Country: Burkina Faso
- Region: Plateau-Central Region
- Province: Ganzourgou
- Department: Zorgho Department

Population (2019)
  - Total: 1,446

Kidiba is a village in the Zorgho Department of Ganzourgou Province in central Burkina Faso.

Population
| Year | Pop. | ±% |
|---|---|---|
| 2006 | 975 | — |
| 2019 | 1,446 | +48.3% |
