= Songdin, Zorgho =

Songdin
- Country: Burkina Faso
- Region: Plateau-Central Region
- Province: Ganzourgou
- Department: Zorgho Department

Population (2019)
  - Total: 1,207

Songdin, Zorgho is a village in the Zorgho Department of Ganzourgou Province in central Burkina Faso.

Population
Year	Pop.	±%
1985	663	—
2006	956	+44.2%
2019	1,207	+26.3%
