= Zaïnga =

- Country: Burkina Faso
- Region: Plateau-Central Region
- Province: Ganzourgou
- Department: Zorgho Department

Population (2019)
  - Total: 1,223

Zaïnga is a village in the Zorgho Department of Ganzourgou Province in central Burkina Faso.

Population
Year	Pop.	±%
1985	939	—
2006	968	+3.1%
2019	1,223	+26.3%
