= Imiga =

Imiga Imanga
- Location in Burkina Faso
- Coordinates: 12°19′N 0°33′W
- Country: Burkina Faso
- Region: Plateau-Central Region
- Province: Ganzourgou
- Department: Zorgho Department

Population (2019)
  - Total: 1,477

Imiga is a village in the Zorgho Department of Ganzourgou Province in central Burkina Faso.

Population
Year	Pop.	±%
1985	1,145	—
2006	991	−13.4%
2019	1,477	+49.0%
