= Tamasgo, Zorgho =

Tamasgo
- Location in Burkina Faso
- Coordinates: 12°14′N 0°32′W
- Country: Burkina Faso
- Region: Plateau-Central Region
- Province: Ganzourgou
- Department: Zorgho Department

Population (2019)
  - Total: 1,228

Tamasgo is a village in the Zorgho Department of Ganzourgou Province in central Burkina Faso.

Population
Year	Pop.	±%
1985	719	—
2006	365	−49.2%
2019	1,228	+236.4%
