= International Cruise Terminal Station, Mumbai =

International cruise terminal in India

General information
- Location: Ballard Estate, Mumbai; India
- Coordinates: 18.9309974°N 72.8409685°E

History
- Opened: Jan 2023

Passengers
- Handles 10 lakh passengers per annum and 500 ships. By 2030 MbPT targeted 1,000 ships calling 1.2 million passengers per annum, bring Mumbai into one of the Asia's biggest cruise ports.
Location

International Cruise Terminal Station Mumbai, is an international cruise terminal with a capacity to handle 500 passengers at a time in the city of Mumbai, India.
