= Liu Sifeng =

Chinese systems engineer (born 1955)

- 劉思峰
- Born: 15 July 1955 (age 71)
- Known for: Grey system theory

Academic background
- Education: Henan University (BE); Huazhong University of Science and Technology (MS, PhD)
- Doctoral advisor: Julong Deng

Academic work
- Discipline: Information theory
- Sub-discipline: decision making with incomplete information

Liu Sifeng (Chinese: 刘思峰; born 15 July 1955) is a Chinese systems engineer. He was the director of the Institute for Grey Systems Studies at Nanjing University of Aeronautics and Astronautics, Nanjing, China. He is best known for his work on grey system theory.

== Education and career ==
Liu obtained his BE in Mathematics from Henan University in 1981, then his MS in economics (1986) and PhD in systems engineering (1998) from Huazhong University of Science and Technology, Wuhan, China. He was the doctoral student of Julong Deng, the founder of grey system theory.

Liu was appointed as a lecturer at Henan University in 1985. He was promoted through the ranks, reaching full professor in 1994. In 2000, he moved as a distinguished professor to Nanjing University of Aeronautics and Astronautics, where he also serves as director of the Institute for Grey Systems Studies. In 2014, he worked as a research professor at De Montfort University in Leicester, UK.

Liu is the editor-in-chief of Grey Systems: Theory and Application, and of the Journal of Grey System.

In 2013, he became the Fellow of Marie Skłodowska-Curie Actions.

== Awards and honors ==
Liu is an honorary fellow of the World Organisation of Systems and Cybernetics, and an honorary editor of "International Journal of Grey Systems" (USA). German Chancellor Angela Merkel mentioned Liu's contributions to grey system theory in a 2019 speech at Huazhong University of Science and Technology. In 2023, he received the Global Excellence Award from the Grey Systems Society of Pakistan.

== Books ==
- Liu, Sifeng; Lin, Yi (2006). Grey Information: Theory and Practical Applications. Springer Science & Business Media. ISBN 978-1-84628-342-0.
- Dang, Yaoguo; Liu, Sifeng; Wang, Yuhong (2010). Optimization of Regional Industrial Structures and Applications. CRC Press. ISBN 978-1-4200-8752-9.
- Fang, Zhigeng; Liu, Sifeng; Shi, Hongxing; Lin, Yi (2010). Grey Game Theory and Its Applications in Economic Decision-Making. CRC Press. ISBN 978-1-4200-8740-6.
- Liu, Sifeng; Fang, Zhigeng; Shi, Hongxing; Guo, Benhai (2010). Theory of Science and Technology Transfer and Applications. CRC Press. ISBN 978-1-4200-8742-0.
- Liu, Sifeng; Forrest, Jeffrey Yi-Lin, eds. (2010). Advances in Grey Systems Research. Springer. ISBN 978-3-642-13938-3.
- Jian, Lirong; Liu, Sifeng; Lin, Yi (2011). Hybrid Rough Sets and Applications in Uncertain Decision-Making. CRC Press. ISBN 978-1-4200-8749-9.
- Liu, Sifeng; Xie, Naiming; Yuan, Chaoqing; Fang, Zhigeng (2012). Systems Evaluation: Methods, Models, and Applications. CRC Press. ISBN 978-1-4200-8847-2.
- Liu, Sifeng; Yang, Yingjie; Forrest, Jeffrey (2016). Grey Data Analysis: Methods, Models and Applications. Springer. ISBN 978-981-10-1841-1.
