= Small nucleolar RNA snR61/Z1/Z11 =

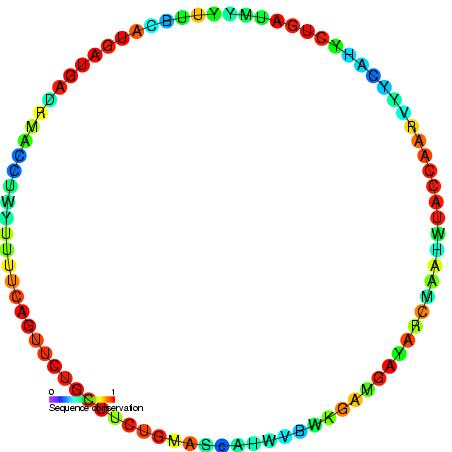
- Predicted secondary structure and sequence conservation of snosnR61

Identifiers
- Symbol: snosnR61
- Rfam: RF00476

Other data
- RNA type: Gene; snRNA; snoRNA; CD-box
- Domain: Eukaryota
- GO: GO:0006396 GO:0005730
- SO: SO:0000593
- PDB structures: PDBe

In molecular biology, Small nucleolar RNA snR61/Z1/Z11 refers to a group of related non-coding RNA (ncRNA) molecules which function in the biogenesis of other small nuclear RNAs (snRNAs). These small nucleolar RNAs (snoRNAs) are modifying RNAs and usually located in the nucleolus of the eukaryotic cell which is a major site of snRNA biogenesis.

These related snoRNAs include yeast (Schizosaccharomyces pombe) snR61, fly (Drosophila melanogaster) Z1 and yeast (Saccharomyces cerevisiae) snR61 and Z11 snoRNAs. They are predicted to belong to the C/D box class of snoRNAs which contain the conserved sequence motifs known as the C box (UGAUGA) and the D box (CUGA). Most of the members of the box C/D family function in directing site-specific 2'-O-methylation of substrate RNAs.
