= Khatgavhan =

Village in Maharashtra, India

Khatgavhan Khatgavan
- Village
- Location in Maharashtra Khatgavhan (India) Khatgavhan (Asia)
- Coordinates: 19°7′23.88″N 76°22′9.48″E
- Country: India
- State: Maharashtra
- Region: Marathwada
- District: Beed
- Taluka: Majalgaon

Government
  - Type: Grampanchayat
  - Sarpanch: Kamalbai Asaram Payghan

Area
  - Total: 243 ha (600 acres)

Population (2011)
  - Total: 1,072
- Demonym: Khatgavhankar

Language
  - Official: Marathi
- Time zone: UTC+5:30 (IST)
- Pin code: 431131
- Vehicle registration: MH–23

Khatgavhan is a village in Majalgaon taluka of Beed district, situated on the banks of Godavari river.

== Administration ==
As per the Constitution of India and Panchayat Raj Act, the village is administered by Sarpanch under Beed Zilla Parishad.

== Demographics ==
According to the 2011 census of India, there are 1072 people living in the village with 242 families.

== 2021 protests ==
The protests in Khatgavhan have been sparked by the failure of the 'Agriculture Insurance Company of India' to provide farmers with the insurance compensation they were promised. Despite receiving a total insurance amount of 860 crores from both central and state governments, farmers have only received a fraction of it, amounting to just 13 crores. This disparity has led to widespread discontent among farmers, prompting strikes and hunger strikes organized by the Shetkari Sangharsha Samiti (Farmers' Struggle Committee) under the leadership of Gangabhishan Thaware. The protests have seen active participation from various farmers, demanding fair compensation for their losses.
