= Zorgho Department =

Coordinates: 12°14′51.91″N 0°36′57.01″W

Zorgho
- Department
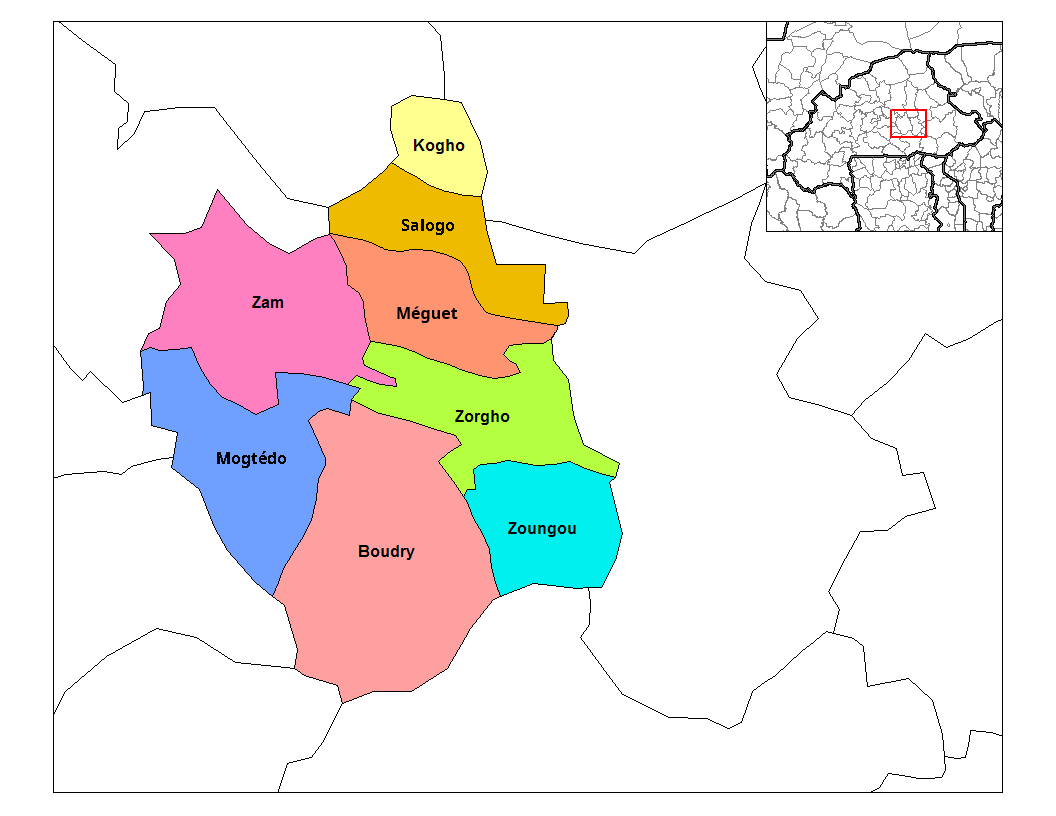
- Zorgho Department's location in the province
- Country: Burkina Faso
- Province: Ganzourgou Province

Area
  - Department: 152 sq mi (394 km^{2})

Population (2019 census)
  - Department: 76,423
  - Density: 502/sq mi (194/km^{2})
  - Urban: 35,398
- Time zone: UTC+0 (GMT 0)

Zorgho is a department or commune of Ganzourgou Province in central-eastern Burkina Faso. Its capital is the town of Zorgho. According to the 2019 census the department has a total population of 76,423.

== Towns and villages ==
- Zorgho (35,398 inhabitants) (capital)
- Bangbily (503 inhabitants)
- Bissiga (1,371 inhabitants)
- Bokin-Koudgo (262 inhabitants)
- Bougré (544 inhabitants)
- Dabèga (501 inhabitants)
- Daguintoéga (355 inhabitants)
- Digré (1,369 inhabitants)
- Douré (843 inhabitants)
- Gonkin (345 inhabitants)
- Imiga (897 inhabitants)
- Kidiba (947 inhabitants)
- Kologuessom (208 inhabitants)
- Koubéogo (658 inhabitants)
- Kourgou (386 inhabitants)
- Nabitenga (975 inhabitants)
- Sapaga (3,316 inhabitants)
- Sapaga -Peulh (500 inhabitants)
- Songdin (987 inhabitants)
- Souka (964 inhabitants)
- Taga (515 inhabitants)
- Tamasgo (931 inhabitants)
- Tamidou (436 inhabitants)
- Tampelcé (169 inhabitants)
- Tintogo (1,450 inhabitants)
- Torodo (2,085 inhabitants)
- Tuiré (1,984 inhabitants)
- Tuiré-Peulh (145 inhabitants)
- Yougoulmandé (771 inhabitants)
- Zaïnga (897 inhabitants)
- Zempassogo (1,192 inhabitants)
- Zinado (734 inhabitants)
- Zinguédéga (890 inhabitants)
