= International Institute for General Systems Studies =

American non-profit organization

The International Institute for General Systems Studies (IIGSS) is an American non-profit scholastic organization for the advancement of scientific studies and education in Systems science and Systemic research with applications in all branches of science and human affairs.

The International Institute for General Systems Studies was established in 1994 and located in Pennsylvania, USA. The current president and director is Jeffrey Yi-Lin Forrest.

In the advisory board of the institute several scientists from several countries participate or have participated such as Gerrit Broekstra (The Netherlands), Guisseppi A. Forgionne (USA), George Klir (USA), Ganti Prasada Rao (India), Achim Sydow (Germany), Yasuhiko Takahara, (Japan), Xuemou Wu (China), Wayne Wymore (USA), and Gerard de Zeeuw (England)
