= Digré =

- Location in Burkina Faso
- Coordinates: 12°17′N 0°34′W
- Country: Burkina Faso
- Region: Plateau-Central Region
- Province: Ganzourgou
- Department: Zorgho Department

Population (2019)
  - Total: 1,977

Digré is a town in the Zorgho Department of Ganzourgou Province in central Burkina Faso.

Population
Year	Pop.	±%
1985	1,587	—
2006	1,113	−29.9%
2019	1,977	+77.6%
