= Bougré =

- Location in Burkina Faso
- Coordinates: 12°13′13″N 0°32′35″W
- Country: Burkina Faso
- Region: Plateau-Central Region
- Province: Ganzourgou
- Department: Zorgho Department

Population (2019)
  - Total: 939

Bougré is a village in the Zorgho Department of Ganzourgou Province in central Burkina Faso.

Population
Year	Pop.	±%
1985	542	—
2006	650	+19.9%
2019	939	+44.5%
