= Tamidou, Zorgho =

Tamidou
- Location in Burkina Faso
- Coordinates: 12°13′N 0°36′W
- Country: Burkina Faso
- Region: Plateau-Central Region
- Province: Ganzourgou
- Department: Zorgho Department

Population (2019)
  - Total: 529

Tamidou, Zorgho is a village in the Zorgho Department of Ganzourgou Province in central Burkina Faso.

Population
Year	Pop.	±%
1985	284	—
2006	1,024	+260.6%
2019	529	−48.3%
