= Grey relational analysis =

Grey relational analysis (GRA) was developed by Deng Julong of Huazhong University of Science and Technology. It is one of the most widely used models of grey system theory. GRA uses a specific concept of information. It defines situations with no information as black, and those with perfect information as white. However, neither of these idealized situations ever occurs in real world problems. In fact, situations between these extremes, which contain partial information, are described as being grey, hazy or fuzzy. A variant of GRA model, Taguchi-based GRA model, is a popular optimization method in manufacturing engineering.

== Definition ==
Let $X_0=\left(x_0\left(1\right),x_0\left(2\right),\dots ,x_0\left(n\right)\right)$ is an ideal data set and$X_k=\left(x_k\left(1\right),x_k\left(2\right),\dots ,x_k\left(n\right)\right),k\mathrm{\ =\ 1,2,3,\dots ,}m$ are the alternative data sets of the same length. The Grey Relational Grade (GRG) between the two data sets is given by

${\mathit{\Gamma}}_{0k}=\int^n_{j=1}{w\left(j\right)\times {\gamma }_{0k}\left(j\right)}$

where the Grey Relational Coefficients (GRC) is

${\gamma }_{0k}\left(j\right)=\frac{{{\min}_k {\min}_j\ }|x_0\left(j\right)-x_k(j)|+{{{\xi \left(j\right)}_{0k}\mathrm{\ }\max}_k {\max}_j|x_0\left(j\right)-x_k(j)|\ }}{|x_0\left(j\right)-x_k(j)|+{{{\xi \left(j\right)}_{0k}\mathrm{\ }\max}_k {\max}_j|x_0\left(j\right)-x_k(j)|\ }}$

where, $w\left(j\right)$ is the weight of the elements of the data sets, and is needed when the GRA method is used to solve multiple criteria decision-making problems. Here, $\xi \left(j\right)\in (0,1]$ denotes the Dynamic Distinguishing Coefficient. Thus, the GRA model defined in this way is called Dynamic Grey Relational Analysis (Dynamic GRA) model. It is the generalized form of Deng's GRA model.

== History ==
GRA is an important part of grey system theory, pioneered by Deng Julong in 1982. A grey system means that a system in which part of information is known and part of information is unknown. Formally, grey systems theory describes uncertainty by interval-valued unknowns called grey numbers, with the width of the interval reflecting more or less precise knowledge. With this definition, information quantity and quality form a continuum from a total lack of information to complete information – from black through grey to white. Since uncertainty always exists, one is always somewhere in the middle, somewhere between the extremes, somewhere in the grey area. Grey analysis then comes to a clear set of statements about system solutions. At one extreme, no solution can be defined for a system with no information. At the other extreme, a system with perfect information has a unique solution. In the middle, grey systems will give a variety of available solutions. Grey relational analysis does not attempt to find the best solution, but does provide techniques for determining a good solution, an appropriate solution for real-world problems. The theory inspired many noted scholars and business leaders like Jeffrey Yi-Lin Forrest, Liu Sifeng, Ren Zhengfei and Joseph L. Badaracco, a professor at Harvard Business School.

The theory has been applied in various fields of engineering and management. Initially, the grey method was adapted to effectively study air pollution and subsequently used to investigate the nonlinear multiple-dimensional model of the socio-economic activities' impact on the city air pollution. It has also been used to study the research output and growth of countries.

In the world, there are many universities, associations and societies promoting grey system theory e.g., International Association of Grey Systems and Decision Sciences (IAGSUA), Chinese Grey System Association (CGSA), Grey Systems Society of China (GSSC), Grey Systems Society of Pakistan (GSSP), Polish Scientific Society of Grey Systems (PSGS), Grey Systems Committee (IEEE Systems, Man, and Cybernetics Society), Centre for Computational Intelligence (De Montfort University), etc.

There are several journals dedicated to grey systems research and studies e.g., "The Journal of Grey System" (UK), "Grey Systems Theory and Application" (Emerald Group Publishing), "International Journal of Grey Systems" (USA), "Journal of Grey System" (Taiwan), "The Grey Journal", Journal of Intelligent and Fuzzy Systems, Kybernetes, etc.
