= List of massacres in Burkina Faso =

List of the massacres in Burkina Faso

The following is a list of massacres that have occurred in Burkina Faso in reverse chronological order:

== List of massacres ==
| Name | Date | Deaths | Involved | Location – Circumstances |
|---|---|---|---|---|
| 2025 Diapaga attack and Guiedougou massacre | March 28 and April 3, 2025 | 250–300+ | Jama'at Nasr al-Islam wal-Muslimin | Est Region, Diapaga, Sourou Valley, Guiedougou |
| Solenzo massacre | March 10 and 11, 2025 | 130+ | Groupe d'autodéfense de Mahouna, Forces rapides de Kouka | Boucle du Mouhoun Region, Solenzo |
| Barsalogho massacre | August 24, 2024 | 600+ | Jama'at Nasr al-Islam wal-Muslimin | Centre-Nord Region, Barsalogho Department, Barsalogho |
| Eastern Burkina Faso military convoy massacres | April 27 - May 10, 2024 | 400+ | Burkina Faso Armed Forces, Volunteers for the Defense of the Homeland, Rapid Intervention Brigade | Sahel Region and Est Region |
| Tawori attack | March 31, 2024 | 75 | Jama'at Nasr al-Islam wal-Muslimin | Est Region, Tapoa Province, Tawori and Boungou gold mine |
| Bibgou and Soualimou massacres | February 29, 2024 | 150+ | Burkina Faso Armed Forces | Est Region, Komondjari Province, Bibgou and Soualimou |
| Nondin and Soro massacres | February 25, 2024 | 223 | Burkina Faso Armed Forces suspected | Nord Region, Yatenga Province, Nondin, Soro and Komsilga |
| Essakane church massacre | February 25, 2024 | 15 | Islamic State - Sahel Province | Sahel Region, Gorom-Gorom Department, Essakane village |
| Djibo massacre | November 26, 2023 | 40+ | Jama'at Nasr al-Islam wal-Muslimin | Sahel region, Djibo – Jihadists broke into villagers' houses and a refugee camp for internally displaced people and killed at least 40 civilians. |
| Karma massacre | April 20, 2023 | 156 | Soldiers | Nord Region, Yatenga province, Karma– Soldiers killed 156 people, burned and looted homes. |
| Kourakou and Tondobi attacks | April 6–7, 2023 | 44 | Islamic State - Sahil Province | Sahel Region, Séno Province, Kourakou and Tondobi |
| 2023 Aorema massacre | March 2, 2023 | 14 | Jama'at Nasr al-Islam wal Muslimin | Nord Region, Yatenga Province, Ouahigouya Department, Aorema |
| Linguekoro massacre | January 28, 2023 | 15 | Jama'at Nasr al-Islam wal-Muslimin | Cascades Region, Linguekoro |
| Goulgountou mosque attack | January 11, 2023 | 9 | Jihadists | Sahel Region, Goulgountou |
| Nouna massacre | December 30, 2022 | 28–88+ | Dozo militiamen affiliated with the VDP | Boucle du Mouhoun Region, Kossi Province, Nouna |
| Bourasso and Namissiguima massacres | July 2–4, 2022 | 34 | Islamic State in the Greater Sahara | Boucle du Mouhoun Region, Kossi Province, Bourasso and Yatenga, Namissiguima |
| Seytenga massacre | June 11–12, 2022 | 86–165+ | Islamic State in the Greater Sahara | Sahel Region, Séno Province, Seytenga |
| Singou massacre | May 25, 2022 | 50+ | Ansarul Islam and Jama'at Nasr al-Islam wal Muslimin | Est Region, Kompienga Province, Singou |
| Markoye massacre | November 1, 2021 | 10 | Islamists | Sahel Region, Oudalan Province, between Dambam and Markoye – Islamists executed 10 civilians on their way to a local market. |
| Gorgadji massacre | August 18, 2021 | 59–80+ | Islamists | Sahel Region, Arbinda |
| 2021 Markoye Department attacks | August 4, 2021 | 30 | Islamic State in the Greater Sahara | Sahel Region, Oudalan Province, Markoye Department, Dambam, Guevara, Tokabangou, Badnoogo, Bassian, Gadba, |
| Yattakou massacre | April 26, 2021 | 18 | Islamic State in the Greater Sahara | Sahel Region, Seno Province, Yattakou |
| Solhan and Tadaryat massacres | June 4 and 5, 2021 | 160 | Islamists | Sahel Region, Yagha Province, Solhan village |
| Kodyel attack | May 3, 2021 | 30 | Islamists | Est Region, Foutouri, Kodyel village |
| 2020 Djibo massacres | November 2019 and June 2020 | 180+ | Burkinabe Armed Forces VDP, FDS | Sahel Region, Djibo and surrounding villages and highways |
| Pansi church shooting | February 16, 2020 | 24 | Terrorists | Sahel Region, Yagha Province, Pansi |
| Nagraogo massacre | January 20, 2020 | 36 | Fulani militants in Jama'at Nasr al-Islam wal Muslimin | Centre-Nord Region, Barsalogho Department, Nagraogo and Alamou |
| Arbinda attack | December 24, 2019 | 35 | Islamic State in the Greater Sahara | Sahel Region, Arbinda |
| Kaïn massacre | February 4, 2019 | 71–84+ | Jama'at Nasr al-Islam wal Muslimin (initial attack) Burkina Faso Armed Forces (reprisal killings) | Boucle du Mouhoun Region, Kossi Province; Nord Region, Yatenga Province, Kain Department, Banh, and Bomboro; Nord Region, Loroum Province |
| Gasseliki massacre | January 10, 2019 | 20 | Ansarul Islam | Sahel Region, Soum Province, Gasseliki |
| Yirgou massacre | December 31, 2018, and January 1, 2019 | 46–216 | Koglweogo (Mossi militia) | Centre-Nord Region, Barsalogho Department, Yirgou; See also: Fulani-Mossi conflict |
| Ouagadougou massacre | August 13–14, 2017 | 19 | Jihadists | Centre Region, Ouagadougou |
| 2016 Ouagadougou attacks | January 15, 2016 | 34 | Al-Qaeda in the Islamic Maghreb Al-Mourabitoun | Centre Region, Ouagadougou |

== Gallery ==
Location of Burkina Faso

Cities and neighboring countries

Administrative divisions

== See also ==
- 2019 attacks in Burkina Faso
- Islamist insurgency in Burkina Faso
- Terrorism in Burkina Faso
- W National Park massacre – massacre in Benin with a connection to Burkina Faso.
- Porga attack– attack in Benin with a connection to Burkina Faso.
