= Fulani-Mossi conflict =

Armed conflict in West Africa

- Part of the Islamist insurgency in Burkina Faso
Date	2014–2018 (low-level, localized conflict); December 31, 2018 – present (full-scale conflict)
Location	Burkina Faso, with spillovers in Mali, Niger, Togo, and Benin

Belligerents
Mossi people; Koglweogos; Volunteers for the Defense of the Homeland; Burkina Faso Armed Forces	Fulani people; Ansarul Islam; Jama'at Nasr al-Islam wal-Muslimin; Islamic State – Sahel Province

Commanders and leaders
Ibrahim Traoré (Burkinabe junta president); Localized leadership	Amadou Koufa; Djaffar Dicko; Ibrahim Malam Dicko †; Localized leadership

Casualties and losses
- Thousands of civilians killed 30,000+ Fulanis displaced to Ouagadougou

The Fulani-Mossi conflict, also known as the Peulh-Mossi conflict, refers to various attacks and massacres between Fulani pastoralists and Mossi farmers, predominantly located in Burkina Faso. The conflict is a subconflict of the jihadist insurgency in Burkina Faso that began in 2015, although ethnically-motivated killings and attacks did not occur on a mass scale until the Yirgou massacre in 2019.

While anti-Fulani sentiment has driven conflicts in Nigeria and Mali for decades, the conflict between Fulani and Mossi groups have primarily been defined by Mossi makeup of pro-government Koglweogo groups, which comprise a majority of the Volunteers for the Defense of the Homeland. Fulani militants comprise a large portion of jihadist groups such as Jama'at Nasr al-Islam wal-Muslimin and the Islamic State – Sahel Province, and Fulani civilians are often targeted by Mossi government forces in suspicion of being affiliated with these groups.

== Background ==
=== Ethnic makeup of Burkina Faso and rise of the Koglweogos ===
The Mossi people inhabit the center of Burkina Faso, including the capital of Ouagadougou, and comprise a majority of the country's population. Because of this, Mossi have a large role in the Burkinabe government. In the rural north, nomadic Fulani pastoralists comprise a large share of the population, extending into the porous Nigerien and Malian borders. In the east, Gourmantches comprise a large majority. Fulani in northern Burkina Faso have felt neglected by the state for decades.

Mossi self-defense groups, known as Koglweogos, first came about in the 1990s and 2000s as a response to a rise in banditry in rural areas. They expanded following the 2014 Burkina Faso uprising due to a lack of security, and eventually became major political players in their respective areas. The Koglweogos are generally pro-government and loosely-connected, and in the late 2010s occasionally engaged in clashes with Fulani groups and dozo fighters in the west of the country. While Koglweogos are predominantly Mossi throughout much of the country, Gourmantche Koglweogo groups exist in and around Fada N'gourma.

=== Jihadist insurgency in Burkina Faso ===
In 2015, Amadou Koufa founded Katiba Macina as a jihadist group based in central Mali and allied with Ansar Dine and other al-Qaeda affiliated groups in Mali that rebelled against the government in the 2012 Tuareg rebellion. Koufa, a Fulani, utilized his past as a radical Islamist preacher to attract young Fulani disheartened with the traditional Fulani hierarchy to his group. Katiba Macina engaged in conflict with Dogon groups in southern Mali, sparking the formation of Dogon defense group Dan Na Ambassagou. Dan Na Ambassagou was supported by the Malian government, but that support was later retracted after the group committed massacres against Fulani civilians.

Koufa's ideas were popular with Fulani across borders. One of his early proteges, Ibrahim Malam Dicko, was a radical Burkinabe Fulani preacher who brought a Katiba Macina cell to northern Burkina Faso in 2015 to form Ansarul Islam. Ansarul Islam expanded into a jihadist insurgency and in 2017, facilitated the rise of Jama'at Nasr al-Islam wal-Muslimin, which Katiba Macina is a part of. These groups recruited heavily from Fulani communities in northern and eastern Burkina Faso, exploiting existing land disputes in communities such as Tongomayel and Boulsa.

== Conflict ==
=== Koglweogos and Yirgou ===
While there had been small attacks between Fulani and Mossi communities, aided heavily by JNIM and Koglweogos on either side, the conflict between Fulani and Mossi did not start in earnest until December 31, 2018, when jihadists speaking Fulfulde entered the village of Yirgou in Barsalogho Department, killing twelve people including the town's mayor and his son. Local Koglweogo groups banded together following the massacre and on March 8, 2019, attacked the villages of Barga, Dingalla-Peulh, and Ramdolla-Peulh. The Peulh in both villages denotes that the villages had mostly Fulani residents. At least 43 civilians were killed by the Koglweogos, who went on to attack seventeen more villages and kill upwards of 210 civilians - mostly Fulanis. Reprisal killings for the Yirgou massacre continued until June 22, 2019.

In October 2019, the Movement of Popular Resistance (MRP) was founded as a way to connect Koglweogos fighting jihadist groups in the north of the country with government aid, and bring dozo groups into this coalition. The head of a national Koglweogo organization, Rassamkande Naaba, denied that the Koglweogo's purpose was to fight jihadism, and instead said that local Koglweogos were responsible for their area's security.

=== VDP and government involvement ===
On November 7, 2019, after a jihadist attack on a mining convoy that killed 37 people, President Roch Marc Christian Kaboré vouched for a law creating the Volunteers for the Defense of the Homeland (VDP), a civilian militia that co-opted many Koglweogo groups in towns on the frontline between the government and jihadists. This law was signed into effect on January 21, 2020, a day after the Nagraogo massacre where Burkinabe soldiers attacked a Mossi community. The VDP law effectively gave the Burkinabe government an outlet to target Fulani communities suspected of harboring jihadist groups, and gave Koglweogo members legal impunity to do the targeting. Discriminatory attacks by Koglweogos and VDP pushed young Fulani to join the jihadists' ranks, exacerbating the jihadist conflict.

An example of these ethnically-motivated massacres sanctioned and committed by Burkinabe forces took place around the city of Djibo in northern Burkina Faso in 2020. Burkinabe forces targeted young Fulani suspected of being jihadists or sympathetic to them, and often executed them en masse with the bodies of Fulani lying on the roads in and out of the city. These massacres were committed by Burkinabe armed forces and police with the help of local civilian volunteers. At the time of the massacres, Djibo was under heavy threat by jihadist groups, which attacked Burkinabe forces regularly.

Since the September 2022 Burkina Faso coup d'état that saw Ibrahim Traoré come to power, the Burkinabe government has relied more and more on VDPs to man bases in rural areas of the country and ensure a government presence in areas where jihadists are active. Unlike 2019 where the conflict between Fulani and Mossi were largely driven by jihadists and local Koglweogo groups, the mass mobilization into the VDP has drawn Mossi from Ouagadougou and elsewhere into the country to fight in areas where they aren't from. This has enabled a common cycle of attacks: jihadist group attacks rural Burkinabe base staffed by barely-trained VDPs and soldiers, and then government forces massacre nearby villages in retaliation. These types of massacres have occurred notably in Karma in April 2023, Nondin and Soro and Bibgou and Soualimou in February 2024, and the eastern part of the country in May 2024. After the massacres, civilians sympathize with jihadist groups, and the cycle starts again. In all massacres, Fulani and non-Mossi civilians like Gourmantches were targeted, although Mossi civilians were often killed as well due to the indiscriminate nature of the attacks.

=== Intra-Fulani conflict ===
Despite the Burkinabe government and Koglweogos' targeting of all Fulani, different clans within the Fulani in Burkina Faso are not as sympathetic to the government. Youth from the lower castes are usually supportive of Amadou Koufa's ideas of jihad to upend the Fulani social hierarchy. In jihadist attacks, the perpetrators rarely discriminate between Fulani and non-Fulani despite the perpetrators being Fulani. However, these groups often tend to target Fulani civilians living in sedentary communities instead of nomadic groups. To Fulani civilians, this makes the threat twofold by government troops and Koglweogos suspecting them of being terrorists and by jihadist groups suspecting them of supporting the government.

In northern Burkina Faso, the primary jihadist group that Fulani join is Ansarul Islam or Katiba Macina, both Fulani-dominated factions of Jama'at Nasr al-Islam wal-Muslimin. In northeastern Burkina Faso, especially Sahel Region in particular, some Fulani clans like the Toloobe have joined the Islamic State – Sahel Province. Prior to 2019, the two groups worked in tandem with one another and drew from the same base of Fulanis and Tuaregs, although since 2019 the Islamic State and JNIM have been at war with each other. Despite ideological reasons for the two groups to go to war, many Fulani join both for non-ideological reasons.

== Displacement ==
Many Fulani and Mossi have been displaced from their villages due to jihadist attacks and government discrimination. Around 30,000 Fulani displaced from areas throughout the country reside in Ouagadougou as of 2024. The number of Fulani, Mossi, and Gourmantché among the 2.1 million civilians displaced during the jihadist insurgency in Burkina Faso is not known. Fulani in Ouagadougou are often neglected by the junta government, and displacement camps are overfilled with refugees.

== See also ==
- Herder–farmer conflicts in Nigeria
