= Operation Kapidougou =

- Part of Jihadist insurgency in Burkina Faso
Date	Kapidougou I: April 3 - April 21, 2023; Kapidougou II: April 21, 2023 - May 2023
Location	Boucle du Mouhoun Region, Burkina Faso
Result	Inconclusive
Territorial changes	Burkinabe forces extend control over major localities in the region; JNIM retains influence on major roads and countryside

Belligerents
Burkina Faso; Burkina Faso Armed Forces; 5th Rapid Intervention Brigade; Volunteers for the Defense of the Homeland; Malian Army (after April 21)	Jama'at Nasr al-Islam wal Muslimin

Commanders and leaders
Celestin Simpore "Captain Lion"; Abdoul Wahib Coulibaly; Toumani Kone	Unknown

Strength
800 (Kapidougou I)	Unknown

Casualties and losses
75+ killed	80+ killed (per Burkina Faso)
- 200+ civilians killed 4,000 displaced

Operation Kapidougou is the name for two operations launched by the Burkinabe Armed Forces and the Malian Armed Forces (FAMa) in April 2023 in Boucle du Mouhoun Region and surrounding regions of Burkina Faso and along the Malian border against Jama'at Nasr al-Islam wal-Muslimin (JNIM) cells in the area.

== Background ==
The Boucle du Mouhoun region has been a hub of jihadist activity by JNIM since 2015, with the group recruiting and seizing territory by utilizing the porous border between Burkina Faso and Mali. Throughout 2022, JNIM had increased its presence in Boucle du Mouhoun like other parts of Burkina Faso despite Burkinabe pressure against the group. Following the Burkinabe coup in September 2022, leader Ibrahim Traoré and Malian junta leader Assimi Goïta began closer collaboration with one another against jihadist organizations. In 2022, the Burkinabe Army coordinated with the Nigerien army to launch Operation Taanli to clear out JNIM in southeastern Burkina Faso and southwestern Niger.

Prior to the start of Operation Kapidougou, Burkinabe civilians had been slaughtered in the Aorema massacre in March. Burkinabe officials stated they would send more troops to the area to prevent further attacks.

== Operation ==
Burkinabe officials announced that Operation Kapidougou, also dubbed Operation Ruche began on April 3, 2023. This initial operation was later dubbed Operation Kapidougou I The operation was being led by a commander named "Captain Lion" of the 5th Rapid Intervention brigade, and around 800 soldiers were taking part in the operation on the Burkinabe side. The goal of the operation, according to Burkinabe media, was the recapture of towns and territory in the region from JNIM. Around 100 soldiers from both Mali and Burkina Faso were deployed to key towns in Boucle du Mouhoun.

The first convoy of Burkinabe soldiers left Ouahigouya towards Boucle du Mouhoun. Burkinabe media reported that several militants were killed in Aorema and Loroum on April 14. At 5pm on April 15, Burkinabe soldiers broke the JNIM siege of Gomboro in Sourou Province along the Malian border, delivering supplies to the population. That same day, six soldiers and over 30 Volunteers for the Defense of the Homeland (VDP) miltiiamen from the operation were killed in a JNIM ambush in Aorema. The Burkinabe government claimed to have killed dozens of jihadists in aerial reprisal attacks. The attack was the first major defeat for Burkinabe forces during Operation Kapidougou. On April 16, twelve militants were reported killed by Burkinabe forces in Tonkoroni, Nouna Department. Burkinabe media posted videos of soldiers sweeping the town of Gassen on April 17, after battles that had reportedly killed 18 militants. The following day, more videos were posted of Burkinabe soldiers on the Gassen-Lanfiéra-Lery axis.

Malian soldiers entered the operation on April 21 under the command of Abdoul Wahib Coulibaly and his superior, Colonel-Major Toumani Kone. This second operation was called Operation Kapidougou II in Malian and Burkinabe media. This operation was the first directed by new Defense Minister Celestin Simpore since his appointment on March 31.

By May 2023, several localities in Boucle du Mouhoun region were still under the influence of JNIM although several cities received a boost in troops. There was no defined end of the operation.

=== Killings ===
The civilian population of Kossi Province and Mouhoun Province were caught by both jihadists and the government during Operation Kapidougou, leading to many killed in reprisal killings on both sides. JNIM placed IEDs along the roads leading in and out of Nouna, along with kidnapping, assassinating, and extorting civilians in the area. On May 12, 2023, JNIM attacked the town of Youlou killing 23 people and on May 20 attacked the town of Kie, killing 20 people. A special delegation of officials from Tchériba Department were kidnapped by JNIM on May 12, and the president of the department killed. Around 4,000 civilians fled Youlou to Tcheriba from May 15-18.

On April 20, Burkinabe soldiers from the 3rd Rapid Intervention Brigade massacred over 150 civilians in the town of Karma, Yatenga Province as a reprisal attack for the attack on Burkinabe forces at Aorema. The massacre was the deadliest in Burkinabe history.
