= Bourasso and Namissiguima massacres =

July 2022 terror attack

- Part of Jihadist insurgency in Burkina Faso
- Location: Bourasso, Kossi Province and Namissiguima, Yatenga, Burkina Faso
- Date: July 2–4, 2022
- Deaths: Total: 34 killed (per Burkinabe government); Bourasso: 22 killed (per Burkinabe government); 30+ killed (per local officials); Namissiguima: 12 killed (per Burkinabe government); 9 killed (per local officials)
- Perpetrator: Islamic State in the Greater Sahara

In early July 2022, two separate massacres occurred in Bourasso, Kossi Province and Namissiguima Department, Yatenga Province in Burkina Faso. The massacre in Bourasso killed 22 people, and the one in Namissiguima killed 12.

== Prelude ==
Northern Burkina Faso has been a hub of jihadist activity since early 2015, with the provinces of Kossi and Yatenga each seeing lots of violence. The towns of Bourasso and Namissiguima, both some of the largest population centers in those areas, have been attacked and battled over numerous times. Prior to the June 30 attack, an attack on June 9 killed four policemen in Kossi and nine were killed in the neighboring province in Séno. Jihadist attacks against civilians had risen since spring 2022, with dozens of attacks in the north of Burkina Faso.

== Bourasso massacre ==
Around 5 pm on July 3, 2022, militants from Islamic State in the Greater Sahara (ISGS) entered the town of Bourasso, firing in the air and leaving shortly after. They returned later that night, threatening churchgoers and prompting arguments and confrontations in front of the local church. Passerby joined these arguments, as this instance was not the first time ISGS militants had entered Bourasso. ISGS then fired on civilians in front of the church, immediately killing 14. They then headed for the center of the village, killing another 20 inhabitants according to the local priest. Survivors of the massacre allege the death toll is over thirty, although the diocese of Nouna announced an official count of 22 dead. The governor of Boucle du Mouhoun region where Bourasso is located, Babo Pierre Bassinga, corroborated the death toll of 22 and claimed the wounded were sent to hospitals in Nouna and Dédougou.

== Namissiguia massacre ==
On July 2, 2022, an attack on Namissiguima in Yatenga Province killed around a dozen people. In the attack, the Burkinabe government stated that six VDP civilian militiamen were killed, along with three civilians, although an anonymous local security source claimed the death toll was around twelve. Following the attack, the Burkinabe government claimed to have clashed with the perpetrators near Barga-Mossi, Burkina Faso, killing seven jihadists and wounding an unknown amount more.
