= Gasseliki massacre =

2019 mass murder in Burkina Faso

Coordinates: 14°00′17″N 0°57′26″W

- Part of Jihadist insurgency in Burkina Faso
- Location: Gasseliki, Soum Province, Burkina Faso
- Date: January 10, 2019
- Deaths: 20
- Injuries: 2

On January 10, 2019, Ansarul Islam militants killed 20 civilians in Gasseliki, Burkina Faso. The attack came in the wake of a massacre perpetrated by the Koglweogo in Yirgou, in Barsalogho department, just days earlier.

== Prelude ==
Northern Burkina Faso has been embroiled in a jihadist insurgency since 2015, against Islamic State in the Greater Sahara, Jama'at Nasr al-Islam wal Muslimin, and Ansar Dine. The insurgency began after these groups, along with many other splinter and side groups, breached the instability of the Burkinabe borders from hubs in Mali. Ansar ul Islam formed in 2016, allied with JNIM, as the first homegrown Burkinabe jihadist group. In 2018, attacks by Ansarul Islam led to the US government sanctioning the group and its affiliates. On December 28, 2018, Ansarul Islam began a campaign stepping up its attack, with an ambush in Loroni killing ten Burkinabe police officers.

== Massacre ==
While the town of Gasseliki was attacked four separate times in January by Ansar ul Islam, according to locals, the deadliest attack occurred on January 10, 2019. Locals claimed that the jihadists were wearing a mixed variety of clothing, some wearing boubous, others in camouflage. The militants then broke into homes, ordering civilians to get up before shooting at them. The attack lasted for around 45 minutes total, and both locals and analysts claimed that the attack was caused by Ansarul Islam demanding that a local self-defense force not be created (likely a Koglweogo). Locals claimed that while a self-defense force protecting two nearby villages also protected Gasseliki, Ansarul Islam attacked the town during a time when the self-defense force was gone. A later attack in Gasseliki killed eight people at a water well. Most of the victims were ethnic Bella, Mossi, or Foulse.

Around that same time on January 27, militants attacked the nearby town of Sikire, with the death toll being ten killed. The Burkinabe government claimed to have killed 146 jihadist militants in retribution for the attacks, although Fulani locals claimed the "jihadists" were actually Fulani civilians targeted in the aftermath of the Yirgou massacre.
