= Tafagou and Nobiol massacres =

- Part of Jihadist insurgency in Burkina Faso
- Location: Tafagou, Nobiol, and other villages in Dori and Gorgadji communes, Burkina Faso
- Date: May 21, 2025
- Deaths: 105+
- Perpetrators: Burkina Faso Armed Forces; Volunteers for the Defense of the Homeland

On May 21, 2025, soldiers from the Burkinabe Armed Forces and allied VDP militiamen attacked several villages including Tafagou and Nobiol in the communes of Dori and Gorgadji, in northeastern Burkina Faso. At least 105 were killed in these massacres.

== Background ==
Burkinabe forces and allied VDP militiamen have conducted various massacres against the civilian populace in search of Jama'at Nasr al-Islam wal-Muslimin militants since the start of the insurgency in Burkina Faso, although death tolls in the three-digit range didn't begin until the Fada N'Gourma-Diapaga massacres in 2024, where several hundred civilians were killed. In March 2025, the Solenzo massacre took place against civilians by Burkinabe forces, where they attacked several villages in Solenzo commune in western Burkina Faso.

== Massacres ==
The convoy of Burkinabe forces left Arbinda on May 21 towards Dori. Along the way, soldiers in the convoy attacked the towns of Tafagou and Nobiol, killing 105 civilians. RFI reported that the attackers didn't spare women, children, or the elderly. The bodies were buried in mass graves. Videos and photos confirmed the government's involvement in the massacres. The Burkinabe government didn't initially release a statement on the massacres. On May 31, Defense Minister Celestin Simpore said that the videos were propaganda, but deleted his statement several hours later.
