= Mamoudou Gazibo =

Nigerien political scientist

Mamoudou Gazibo OON
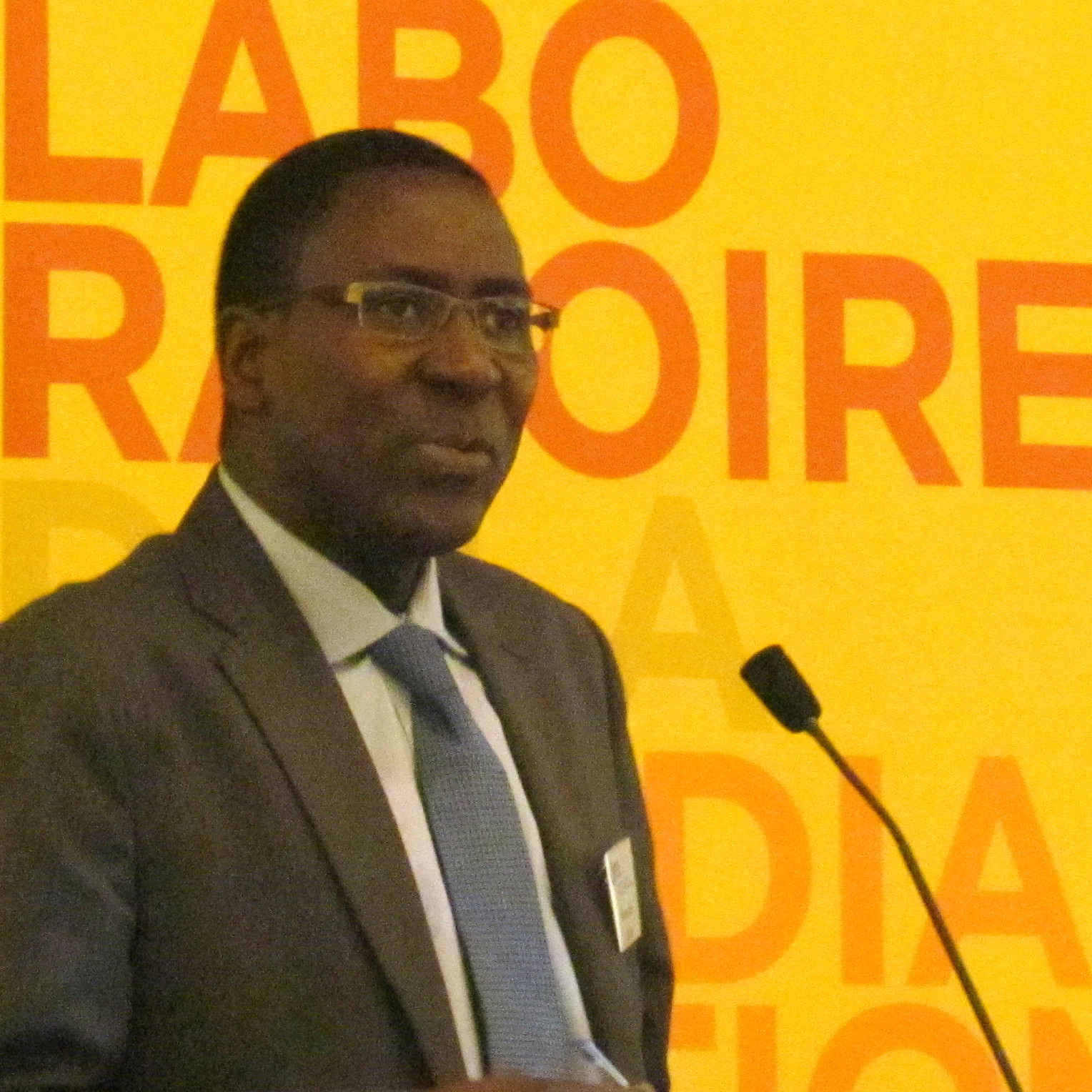
- Education: Montesquieu University
- Awards: Grand officier, Order of the Niger
- Scientific career
- Fields: Political science
- Workplaces: Université de Montréal

Mamoudou Gazibo OON is a Nigerien political scientist. He is a professor of political science at the Université de Montréal. He studies comparative political institutions and democratisation across African countries.

== Education and positions ==
Gazibo attended Montesquieu University in Bordeaux, where he graduated in 1994 with a political science degree. He continued to study there, and in 1995 completed a graduate diploma in political science, followed by a doctorate in political science in 1998.

After finishing his doctorate, Gazibo became a post-doctoral researcher at the Université de Montréal. In 2000, he joined the faculty of political science, first as an adjoint professor, and then in 2006 became a Professeur agrégé and in 2012 a Professeur titulaire (a full professor).

== Research ==
In 2005, Gazibo published the book Les paradoxes de la démocratisation en Afrique. The book studies politics in African countries using a neo-institutionalist framework, focusing on how formal and informal rules constrain group and individual behaviour including through the presences of incentives and strategies. Gazibo particularly focuses on the cases of Benin and Niger, and on the interaction between economics and politics. Gazibo specifically investigates the determinants of democratisation, stressing the importance of incentive structures, political institutions, and economic conditions which are favourable to the emergence of democracy.

In 2006, Gazibo wrote Introduction à la politique africaine, which is a textbook intended to introduce the study of African politics. The book is divided into three sections: the first on methodology in African studies, the second on the structure of government, and the third on the challenges of governance. Introduction à la politique africaine was reprinted in a second edition in 2010.

Gazbio published the book Un nouvel ordre mondial made in China? with Roromme Chantal in 2011. They study the history of political consolidation in China leading up to its development as a world power in industry and manufacturing. They investigate the ramifications of this role in international politics, including China's military development and the creation of information warfare. The book also concerns China's modern involvement in multilateral diplomacy.

In 2009, Gazibo co-edited Le politique - Etat des debats et pistes de recherche with Céline Thiriot. With Daniel C. Bach, Gazibo co-edited the 2011 book L'État néopatrimonial : genèse et trajectoires contemporaines and the 2012 book Neopatrimonialism Africa and Beyond. In 2016, Gazibo and Muna Ndulo coauthored the book Growing Democracy in Africa: Elections, Accountable Governance, and Political Economy.

From 2010 to 2011, Gazibo acted as a special counselor to the Prime Minister of Niger. He was also the president of the comité des textes fondamentaux, responsible for drafting fundamental text for the 2010 Constitution of Niger.

In 2011, Gazibo was named a Grand officier of the Order of the Niger.

Gazibo has been interviewed, or his work has been covered, in media outlets including Jeune Afrique, AllAfrica, Radio France Internationale, Le Devoir, and Agence Ecofin.

== Selected works ==
- Les paradoxes de la démocratisation en Afrique (2005)
- Introduction à la politique africaine (2006; 2010)
- Un nouvel ordre mondial made in China?, with Roromme Chantal (2011)

== Selected awards ==
- Grande officier, Order of the Niger (2010)
