= Eastern Burkina Faso military convoy massacres =

Series of massacres in May 2024

- Part of Jihadist insurgency in Burkina Faso
- Location: Sahel Region and Est Region, Burkina Faso
- Date: April 27 - May 10, 2024
- Target: Fulani civilians and civilians accused of collaborating with jihadists
- Deaths: 400+
- Injuries: Unknown
- Perpetrators: Burkina Faso Armed Forces: Rapid Intervention Brigade; BIR 4; BIR 5; BIR 9; BIR 12; BIR 19; BIR 20

Throughout May 2024, a convoy carrying soldiers from the Burkina Faso Armed Forces and the Volunteers for the Defense of the Homeland committed several massacres against civilians in eastern Burkina Faso, killing at least 400 civilians during the convoy's journey between April 27 and May 10. The massacres occurred in a similar area to the Nondin and Soro massacres and Bibgou and Soualimou massacres that occurred a few months earlier.

== Background ==
Much of northern and eastern Burkina Faso has been the frontline of an insurgency waged by Jama'at Nasr al-Islam wal-Muslimin (JNIM) and the Islamic State in the Greater Sahara since 2015, with these groups intensifying their attacks on civilians seen as sympathetic to the government since 2019. Within Burkina Faso, ISGS is predominantly active in the tri-border area between Mali, Niger, and Burkina Faso. Since the September 2022 Burkina Faso coup d'état that saw Ibrahim Traoré rise to power, the Burkinabe government and VDP auxiliaries have conducted massacres against civilian areas that have killed hundreds of civilians.

In February 2024, in response to simultaneous jihadist attacks on civilians and a military convoy near Ouahigouya, Burkinabe soldiers and pro-government militiamen attacked the villages of Komsilga, Nondin, and Soro, killing over 223 people. Days later, Burkinabe soldiers killed up to 150 people in the Bibgou and Soualimou massacres.

== Massacres ==
The military convoy set out with the task of supplying cities and military bases in eastern Burkina Faso besieged by jihadist groups. The first group of soldiers, made up of Rapid Intervention Brigades 5 and 9 (BIR), left the city of Dori on April 27 and headed out towards Mansila. Mansila had been under siege by JNIM since 2020, and had not been supplied by the government by land since December 2022. On the first day of the journey, the convoy committed its first massacre after being hit by a mine. Thirty people were killed in Niagassi, including fifteen women and nine children, in response to the explosion. The convoy then committed three massacres in Ouro-Djiama, Tepare, and Bognori close to Mansila, killing at least 100 people. The first convoy reached Mansila on May 4, returning via a slightly different route.

The second convoy was composed of soldiers from BIRs 20, 12, 4, and 19, and left Fada N'gourma between May 3 and 5 towards Tankaoulou and Foutouri before returning to Fada N'gourma on May 19. The second convoy did not encounter any jihadist attacks, and only discovered one explosive mine. Despite this, Burkinabe soldiers opened fire in several villages they came across, not distinguishing between men, women, or children. Survivors noted that a predominantly Gourmantche village was spared, but Fulani villages were decimated. The villagers targeted admitted to paying a JNIM-enforced zakat tax, which the military took as proof of the villagers' collusion with JNIM. Around 100 people were killed between May 3 and 9 in villages on the road between Tankaoulou and Fada N'gourma.

Several casualties were reported from at least five mine explosions that the first convoy ran across. The villages that were hit the worst by the massacres were Gatougou, where 84 people were killed and photos showed the bodies of at least seventy people littering the streets of the locality, including women and six infants; Reports from Kampalougou estimated that at least 79 people were killed later on in the convoy's journey. Videos, some taken by the soldiers and some by jihadists who were the first to arrive on scene after the massacres, showed corpses of men, women, and children, including burned bodies.
