= Essakane church massacre =

2024 mass murder in Burkina Faso

- Part of Jihadist insurgency in Burkina Faso
- Location: Essakane-Village, Gorom-Gorom Department, Burkina Faso
- Date: 25 February 2024
- Target: Catholic churchgoers
- Deaths: 15
- Injuries: 2
- Perpetrator: Islamic State - Sahel Province

On February 25, 2024, jihadists from the Islamic State – Sahel Province (ISGS) killed fifteen parishioners at a church in Essakane-Village, Gorom-Gorom Department, Burkina Faso. In retaliation for the attack, Burkinabe soldiers killed over two hundred civilians in the Nondin and Soro massacres that same day.

== Background ==
Much of northern Burkina Faso has been the frontline of an insurgency waged by Jama'at Nasr al-Islam wal-Muslimin and the Islamic State in the Greater Sahara since 2015, with these groups intensifying their attacks on civilians seen as sympathetic to the government since 2019. Within Burkina Faso, ISGS is predominantly active in the tri-border area between Mali, Niger, and Burkina Faso.

On the same day of the attack in Essakane, jihadists attacked a mosque in Natiaboani near Fada N'gourma and three military detachments in Tankoualou, Kongoussi, and Ouahigouya, killing ten VDP militiamen.

== Massacre ==
The attack was committed against a Catholic church in Essakane during Sunday mass. Father Jean-Pierre Sawadogo, vicar general of the diocese of Dori, initially reported a "terrorist attack" on the church that killed fifteen parishioners. Twelve of the victims were killed on site, and three died at a local hospital of their injuries. Two other parishioners were injured. The Islamic State claimed responsibility for the attack on March 8.

The church massacre, combined with the attacks elsewhere in the country that same day, were the reason behind retaliatory attacks by Burkinabe soldiers and VDP militants against civilians in the villages of Komsilga, Nondin, and Soro.
