= Kaïn massacre =

2019 mass murder in Burkina Faso

- Part of Jihadist insurgency in Burkina Faso
- Location: Kain Department, Banh, and Bomboro, Yatenga Province, Loroum Province, and Kossi Province, Burkina Faso
- Date: February 3-4, 2019
- Target: Civilians (by jihadists); Fulani civilians (by Burkinabe government)
- Deaths: 71-84+: 14 in Kaïn by jihadists; 57-60+ in and around Kaïn by Burkinabe forces
- Perpetrators: Jama'at Nasr al-Islam wal Muslimin (initial attack); Burkina Faso Armed Forces (reprisal killings)
- No. of participants: 146 jihadists killed (per Burkinabe government)

The Kaïn massacre refers to the February 4, 2019 attack by Jama'at Nasr al-Islam wal-Muslimin (JNIM) on the village of Kaïn, Yatenga Province, Burkina Faso that killed fourteen people. A reprisal counter-terrorist operation by Burkinabe forces following the attack reportedly killed 146 jihadists, although Human Rights Watch and local NGOS attested that at least 60 of the suspected jihadists killed were civilians.

== Background ==
In early 2019, jihadist groups like Jama'at Nasr al-Islam wal-Muslimin and Ansarul Islam began launching more attacks on villages in northern Burkina Faso, with the Burkinabe government employing more indiscriminate counter-measures against the jihadist groups. On December 31, 2018, the Burkinabe government created the pro-government militia Volunteers for the Defense of the Homeland (VDP), which was signed into law in January 2019. On the same day of the VDP's creation, a small jihadist attack on a Mossi village led Mossi militias to kill over 210 mostly-Fulani civilians.

== Massacre ==
The Burkinabe government reported the massacre on February 5 in a statement saying that the jihadists attacked Kaïn on the night between February 3 and 4, 2019, killing fourteen civilians. In response, the government stated it launched counter-terrorism operations in the vicinities of Kain, Banh in Loroum Province, and Bomboro in Kossi Province. Human Rights Watch reported that during these counter-operations, Burkinabe forces would target market days that attracted Fulani pastoralists, and target and execute Fulani traders.

International Crisis Group reported that of the 146 suspected terrorists killed by the government, 57 were civilians. The Burkinabe Human Rights Movement released a report stating that 60 civilians were killed by Burkinabe forces in and around Kain and Banh following the massacre.
