= Bibgou and Soualimou massacres =

- Part of Jihadist insurgency in Burkina Faso
- Location: Bibgou and Soualimou, Komondjari Province, Burkina Faso
- Date: February 29, 2024; 2pm
- Target: Fulanis and Gourmantches
- Deaths: <150
- Injuries: 40+
- Perpetrator: Burkina Faso Armed Forces

On February 29, 2024, soldiers from the Burkinabe Armed Forces killed up to 150 civilians in the villages of Bibgou and Soualimou, Komondjari Province, Burkina Faso. The massacres occurred just four days after the Nondin and Soro massacres, which were reprisal attacks by government forces against civilians alleged to be collaborating with jihadists that killed 220 people.

== Background ==
Much of northern Burkina Faso has been the frontline of an insurgency waged by Jama'at Nasr al-Islam wal-Muslimin and the Islamic State in the Greater Sahara since 2015, with these groups intensifying their attacks on civilians seen as sympathetic to the government since 2019. Within Burkina Faso, ISGS is predominantly active in the tri-border area between Mali, Niger, and Burkina Faso. Since the September 2022 Burkina Faso coup d'état that saw Ibrahim Traoré rise to power, the Burkinabe governmentand VDP auxiliaries have conducted massacres against civilian areas that have killed hundreds of civilians.

On February 25, simultaneous jihadist attacks against civilians at a Catholic church and military patrols in Ouahigouya and Est Region killed dozens of civilians and soldiers. In response, Burkinabe forces attacked the villages of Komsilga, Nondin, and Soro, killing at least 220 civilians.

== Massacres ==
According to a survivor of the attack, Burkinabe soldiers arrived in the villages of Bibgou and Soualimou at around 2pm on February 29. The soldiers first targeted homes of Fulani civilians, but many Fulani had already fled the area. The soldiers then attacked homes of Gourmantches, who had remained in the town. A survivor stated that the soldiers told remaining civilians to line up in the street, where they were shot. That same survivor estimated that up to 150 people could have been killed, and said that at least 40 were wounded and taken to Gayéri for treatment. A video on March 4 showed dozens of bodies lying in the street, including men, women, and children.

RFI stated that Burkinabe authorities responded to them saying they had no knowledge of the event.
