= Nouna massacre =

2022 mass killing in Nouna, Burkina Faso

- Part of Jihadist insurgency in Burkina Faso
- Location: Nouna, Burkina Faso
- Date: December 30, 2022
- Target: Fulani civilians
- Deaths: 88+
- Perpetrator: Dozo militiamen affiliated with the VDP
- Motive: Reprisal attack for a jihadist attack on the VDP headquarters in Nouna

On December 30, 2022, dozo militants affiliated with the Volunteers for the Defense of the Homeland (VDP) killed over 88 civilians in Nouna, Burkina Faso.

== Background ==
The Volunteers for the Defense of the Homeland (VDP) is a pro-government civilian defense group formed in 2019 to repel jihadist attacks from Jama'at Nasr al-Islam wal Muslimin and Ansarul Islam in northern Burkina Faso. The group has been accused of massacres against Fulanis, who make up the bulk of JNIM and other jihadist groups. Traditional dozo hunters in western Burkina Faso are the main local fighters of the VDP in the Nouna area, despite conflicts with Mossi Koglweogo, the predecessor to the VDP. In October 2022, the Burkinabe junta led by Ibrahim Traoré announced the recruitment of 50,000 new VDPs to combat the jihadist insurgency in the country.

Prior to the attack in Nouna, dozo hunters had been accused of several attacks in Burkina Faso. An attack in Loropéni in December 15 killed five civilians, and three days later, suspected VDP kidnapped and executed a father and son in Kongoussi. On December 22, VDP kidnapped and executed Fulani men and the traditional Fulani leader in the village of Marmisga, and later looted the property of the villagers.

== Massacre ==
On the night between December 29 and 30, 2022, armed men belonging to Jama'at Nasr al-Islam wal Muslimin attacked the headquarters of the VDP stationed in Nouna. In response, dozo hunters affiliated with the VDP moved into the Sector 4 and Sector 6 neighborhoods, which were predominantly Fulani. On the night of December 30, the dozos went door-to door, killing all men over the age of 16. A report from the Collective Against Impunity and the Stigmatization of Communities, a Burkinabe rights group, stated that the dozos sought out "influential" Fulani civilians. The dozos later returned to loot the houses of the civilians they killed.

== Aftermath ==
By January 2, thirty-eight people had been killed in Sector 6 and forty-eight people had been killed in Sector 4. However, the death toll is likely to be higher, as those numbers are only of those who were buried under the authority of the traditional chieftain of Nouna on December 31, and more bodies were being discovered each day after the massacre. Two more bodies were discovered on January 2 according to survivors in an interview with Amnesty International.

On January 2, the Burkinabe government announced an investigation into the killings of 28 people in Nouna on the date of the massacre.

Analysts compared the Nouna massacre to the Yirgou massacre in 2019, when Koglweogo militants killed over 100 Fulani civilians in reprisal attacks following the murder of a Mossi leader by jihadists.
