= Loungue =

- Location within Burkina Faso, French West Africa
- Coordinates: 13°24′N 1°52′W
- Country: Burkina Faso
- Time zone: UTC+0 (GMT)

Loungue is a town within the Namissiguima department of Yatenga Province in northern Burkina Faso.
