= March 2023 Aorema massacre =

- Part of Jihadist insurgency in Burkina Faso
- Location: Aorema, Ouahigouya Department, Yatenga Province, Burkina Faso
- Date: March 2, 2023
- Deaths: 14
- Perpetrator: Jama'at Nasr al-Islam wal Muslimin

On March 2, 2023, jihadists from Jama'at Nasr al-Islam wal-Muslimin (JNIM) attacked the village of Aorema, Yatenga Province, Burkina Faso. They killed fourteen civilians.

== Background ==
Much of northern Burkina Faso has been the frontline of an insurgency waged by Jama'at Nasr al-Islam wal-Muslimin and the Islamic State in the Greater Sahara since 2015, with these groups intensifying their attacks on civilians seen as sympathetic to the government since 2019. These jihadist groups had been known to invade Aorema multiple times over the past few years demanding zakat and that the youth not enter restaurants.

== Massacre ==
On March 2, JNIM fighters entered a restaurant in Aorema where a bunch of youth were gathered and fired indiscriminately on them. Seven people were killed in the restaurant on the spot, and three died in their homes from stray bullets. Fourteen people were killed in the attacks, including those who died of their injuries. In response to the attack, Burkinabe authorities established a province-wide curfew from 10 p.m. and 5 a.m. until March 31 the next day. Burkinabe officials also stated that they were conducting counter-terrorism operations to find the perpetrators.

== Aftermath ==
JNIM attacked Aorema again on April 16, 2023, killing forty people and injuring 33 others. Many of the dead were VDP civilian volunteers sent to the area to fight JNIM. While no group claimed responsibility for the March massacre, JNIM was suspected of the attack.
