= Linguekoro massacre =

2023 mass murder in Burkina Faso

- Part of Jihadist insurgency in Burkina Faso
- Location: Linguekoro, Cascades Region, Burkina Faso
- Date: January 28, 2023
- Deaths: 15
- Perpetrator: Jama'at Nasr al-Islam wal Muslimin

On January 28, 2023, suspected Jama'at Nasr al-Islam wal Muslimin militants stopped two buses headed from Banfora to Mangodara near the village of Linguekoro, Comoé Province, Burkina Faso, and killed fifteen passengers.

== Prelude ==
Jihadist militant groups such as Jama'at Nasr al-Islam wal Muslimin have captured large swathes of territory in southern Burkina Faso since 2017. In attacks against civilians in the Sahel, JNIM militants often stop buses and profile passengers, killing some or all of them. Bus massacres occurred in Silgadji, Burkina Faso in September 2022 and in Bandiagara, Mali, that same month. On the same day of the Linguekoro attack, a bus was stopped by JNIM in between Tenkodogo and Ouargaye near the village of Lalgaye, with at least twenty passengers killed.

== Massacre ==
While passing through the village of Linguekoro from Banfora, two "Dina" minibuses were stopped by armed gunmen. The buses' passengers, which included eight men and sixteen women, were evacuated by the gunmen. The gunmen then took a group of passengers with them, and told eight women and one man to walk to Mangodara. The two buses were then torched, and the remaining passengers taken away. Burkinabe authorities found their bodies on January 30, with bullet holes in them.

International Crisis Group suspected the jihadists of being Jama'at Nasr al-Islam wal Muslimin, due to the group's presence in southern Burkina Faso.

== Aftermath ==
The governor of Cascades Region, Jean-Charles dit Yenapono Some, released a statement regarding the details of the massacre and the bodies on January 31. He urged the population of the region to express support for the Volunteers for the Defense of the Homeland (VDP), a pro-government auxiliary.
