= Gomboro Department =

Gomboro
- Department
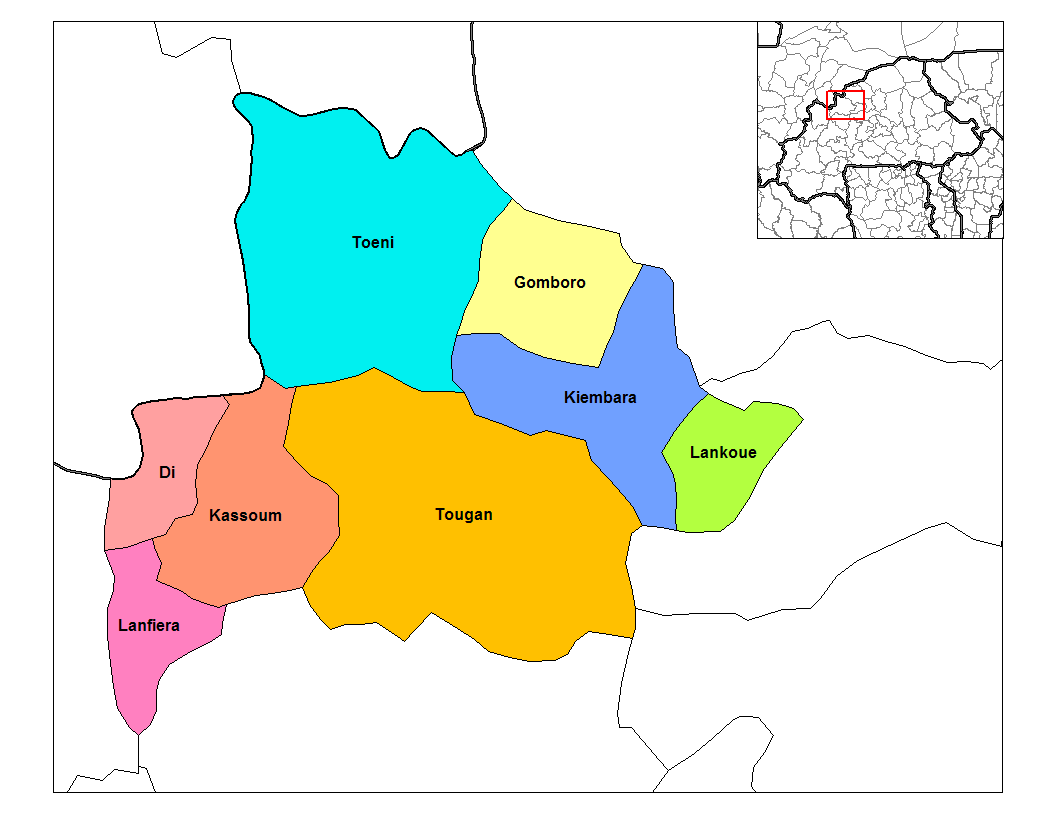
- Gomboro Department location in the province
- Coordinates: 13.483°N 2.767°W
- Country: Burkina Faso
- Province: Sourou Province

Area
  - Total: 483.0 km^{2} (186.5 sq mi)

Population (2019 census)
  - Total: 12,656
  - Density: 26.20/km^{2} (67.87/sq mi)
- Time zone: UTC+0 (GMT 0)

Gomboro is a department or commune of Sourou Province in north-western Burkina Faso. Its capital lies at the town of Gomboro.
