= April 2023 Aorema attack =

2023 battle in Burkina Faso

- Part of Jihadist insurgency in Burkina Faso
Date	April 15, 2023
Location	Aorema, Yatenga Province, Burkina Faso
Result	Indecisive

Belligerents
Burkina Faso: Burkina Faso Armed Forces; Volunteers for the Defense of the Homeland	Jama'at Nasr al-Islam wal Muslimin

Casualties and losses
75+ soldiers and VDP killed (per Liberation); 6 soldiers and 34 VDP killed (per Burkinabe govt); 33 injured	~50 killed (per Burkina Faso)

On April 15, 2023, jihadists from Jama'at Nasr al-Islam wal-Muslimin attacked a group of Burkinabe soldiers and civilian volunteers in the Volunteers for the Defense of the Homeland (VDP) near Aorema, Yatenga Province, Burkina Faso, killing at least forty soldiers and VDP and injuring over thirty others. The attack occurred a month after a massacre against civilians by JNIM in Aorema that killed fourteen. Following the attack, Burkinabe soldiers searching for the perpetrators of the April attack killed over 130 civilians in the Karma massacre.

== Background ==
Much of northern Burkina Faso has been the frontline of an insurgency waged by Jama'at Nasr al-Islam wal-Muslimin and the Islamic State in the Greater Sahara since 2015, with these groups intensifying their attacks on civilians seen as sympathetic to the government since 2019. These jihadist groups had been known to invade Aorema multiple times over the past few years demanding zakat.

On March 2, 2023, JNIM attacked a restaurant in Aorema, killing fourteen civilians. The massacre prompted Burkinabe authorities to establish a curfew until March 31. Jihadists from JNIM's rival group ISGS killed 44 civilians in the Kourakou and Tondobi attacks in Séno Province, which neighbors Yatenga.

== Attack ==
At around 4pm on April 15, JNIM fighters attacked an outpost in Aorema manned by Burkinabe soldiers and VDP. The detachment was intended to man the aerodrome at Ouahigouya. Burkinabe officials reported that forty people were killed in the attack and 33 were injured. Of the dead, six Burkinabe soldiers and thirty-four VDP were killed, and most of the thirty-three wounded were evacuated to the Regional University Hospital of Ouahigouya in a stable condition. The Burkinabe government statement also mentioned that around 50 jihadists were killed in an aerial response.

A report by Libération stated that security sources in the region assessed that over 75 soldiers were killed in the attack, the majority of which were VDP.

== Aftermath ==
The International Crisis Group attributed the attack to JNIM. The attack also fueled the Karma massacre on April 20, where Burkinabe soldiers of the Rapid Intervention Brigade went door-to-door in the village of Karma, seventeen kilometers away from Aorema, and shot indiscriminately at civilians. 157 civilians were killed in the massacre.
