= 2020 Djibo massacres =

Massacres in Burkina Faso

- Part of Jihadist insurgency in Burkina Faso
- Location: Djibo and surrounding villages and highways, Burkina Faso
- Date: November 2019 - June 2020
- Target: Mostly Fulani civilians; civilians arrested by Burkinabe forces
- Deaths: 180+
- Injuries: Unknown
- Perpetrators: Burkina Faso; Burkinabe Armed Forces; VDP; FDS
- Motive: Suspected links to jihadists

Between November 2019 and June 2020, the bodies of over 180 civilians were discovered in and around the city of Djibo, Burkina Faso. Most of the killings targeted Fulani, and were committed by Burkinabe Armed Forces, Volunteers for the Defense of the Homeland (VDP), and Defense and Security Forces (FDS). Several mass graves were made for the victims in March and April 2020.

== Background ==
Since 2015, northern Burkina Faso has been embroiled in a jihadist insurgency against the al-Qaeda aligned Jama'at Nasr al-Islam wal Muslimin coalition and the homegrown Ansarul Islam. The insurgency intensified and spread to the entirety of the country in 2019, and in response the government stepped up recruiting for the Volunteers for the Defense of the Homeland (VDP), pro-government militias used to combat the insurgents. In August 2019, JNIM and the Islamic State in the Greater Sahara (ISGS) launched an offensive in Liptako-Gourma, the tri-border area between Burkina Faso, Mali, and Niger.

The city of Djibo in northern Burkina Faso was under Burkinabe and VDP control between 2019 and 2020, although persistent jihadist attacks and a heavy jihadist presence just outside the city limits threatened the security of the city. The city had been blockaded by the jihadists for months. Since many of the Islamist groups recruit from Fulani communities, Burkinabe forces targeted Fulani civilians much heavier.

== Massacres ==
The massacres took place between November 2019 and June 2020 in and around the city of Djibo. Many of the bodies were Fulani, and suffered signs of torture such as being blindfolded and handcuffed before being shot. The first appearance of bodies by residents of Djibo occurred in November 2019. Residents speaking to Human Rights Watch stated that they began seeing clusters of bodies on the outskirts of the city, mainly on the highways in and out of the town. They also stated that the bodies were not the results of clashes between jihadists and Burkinabe forces, as "word travels fast, and we'd know if that were the case. Public transport would have stopped, we would have never been able to travel."

Some residents recognized the bodies strewn about in November as family members and acquaintances. The victims had been spotted at various places, including a cattle market, working as a security guard before being arrested by VDP, and other areas of the city. The residents told HRW that all of the victims had been detained by the authorities for questioning regarding possible ties to jihadists, and that many of the victims were IDPs from war-stricken areas.

=== Sector 4 massacre ===
Three groups of bodies were discovered within a one kilometer radius in Djibo's Sector 4 neighborhood in November 2019. Forty-three bodies appeared in the circle; one group had eight victims, one had sixteen, and one had between sixteen and nineteen. One resident stated many of the victims were shirtless and tied up, either by the eyes or hands. They mentioned that they had heard vehicles coming from that area of town and subsequent gunshots. It was also too dark to make out the uniforms of the perpetrators, but it was unlikely to be jihadists as there was little chance of a jihadist truck driving that deep into Djibo that late at night. The interviewee concluded that the victims were all likely prisoners. Another resident corroborated hearing vehicles the night before, along with the victims being tied up. The second interviewee stated that nineteen bodies were discovered in a line the next morning, all of them men except for a 15-year old boy. Another group of five bodies was spotted near the village of Mentao on the outskirts of Djibo, all of whom wearing Fulani clothing. The bodies in Mentao had been there for a week before being discovered. All three groups of victims laid where they were dumped until mid-March 2020, when they were buried.

=== Tongomayel massacre ===
Nine men were also discovered in the village of Tongomayel on January 15. A relative of one of the victims stated that his nephew and eight others were arrested at the town's market by Burkinabe forces, and were driven to the Djibo Dam, where gunshots were heard. All of the victims were found face-down and tied, and eight were Fulani and one was Bellah. The bodies were not buried until March.

=== Djibo-Tongomayal highway massacre ===
Eighteen bodies were discovered near billboards along the Djibo-Tongomayal highway on March 17, 2020. A relative of a victim stated that his brother was arrested with several others while boarding a bus in Djibo to Ouagadougou. The relative heard gunshots later that night, and went to the location of them the next morning. While they discovered eighteen bodies along the highway, the interviewee's brother was not among them. Six victims, however, had been detained by Defense and Security Forces, a Burkinabe paramilitary prior to their deaths.

=== Mbodowol massacre ===
On May 14, the bodies of seventeen men were discovered in Djibo's Mbodowol neighborhood after having been arrested by Burkinabe forces the day prior. The body of a mentally disabled man appeared in the same area six days later. A witness to the arrests stated that all seventeen men had come from nearby villages to trade and sell at the Djibo market, and that their bodies were discovered the next day all shot in the head, with bullet casings next to their bodies. All of the men, including the disabled one, were between 25 and 45 years old. Another witness to the arrests stated that only Burkinabe forces would be active during the time the victims were killed.

=== Southern Djibo massacre ===
The bodies of five men were discovered on June 13, including the chief of Gomde Peulh village. A witness to chief's whereabouts prior to his death stated that they saw Burkinabe soldiers detain the chief and six others and bring them into a building. The six others were eventually let go, but the chief remained detained. Gunshots were heard later that day coming from the area of the building, and five bodies were strewn about the area. All of the bodies were buried on the same day.

114 bodies of victims were buried between March 8 and 9, 2020, in Djibo. Eighteen men were buried in early April, and forty other bodies were discovered in and around the Djibo Airport in March and May. At least 180 bodies had been discovered in the mass graves, and the majority of them were committed against Fulani by Burkinabe Armed Forces, VDP, and Defence and Security Forces (FDS).

== Reactions ==
=== Local ===
Burkinabe activists created a "Fulani Lives Matter" campaign in the wake of the massacres. Burkinabe Defence Minister Moumouna Cherif Sy stated that it was hard for security forces to distinguish between jihadists and civilians. Sy also claimed that most of the killings could have been perpetrated by jihadist groups. Burkinabe authorities also promised to investigate the killings and bring justice to the victims.

=== International ===
The United States stated that the massacres in Djibo could put military aid to Burkina Faso at risk. The United Kingdom and European Union called on Burkinabe authorities to investigate the massacres. Human Rights Watch described the city of Djibo as a "killing field" due to the prevalence of the massacres.
