= Tougouri Department =

Coordinates: 13°18′55″N 0°31′05″W

- Department
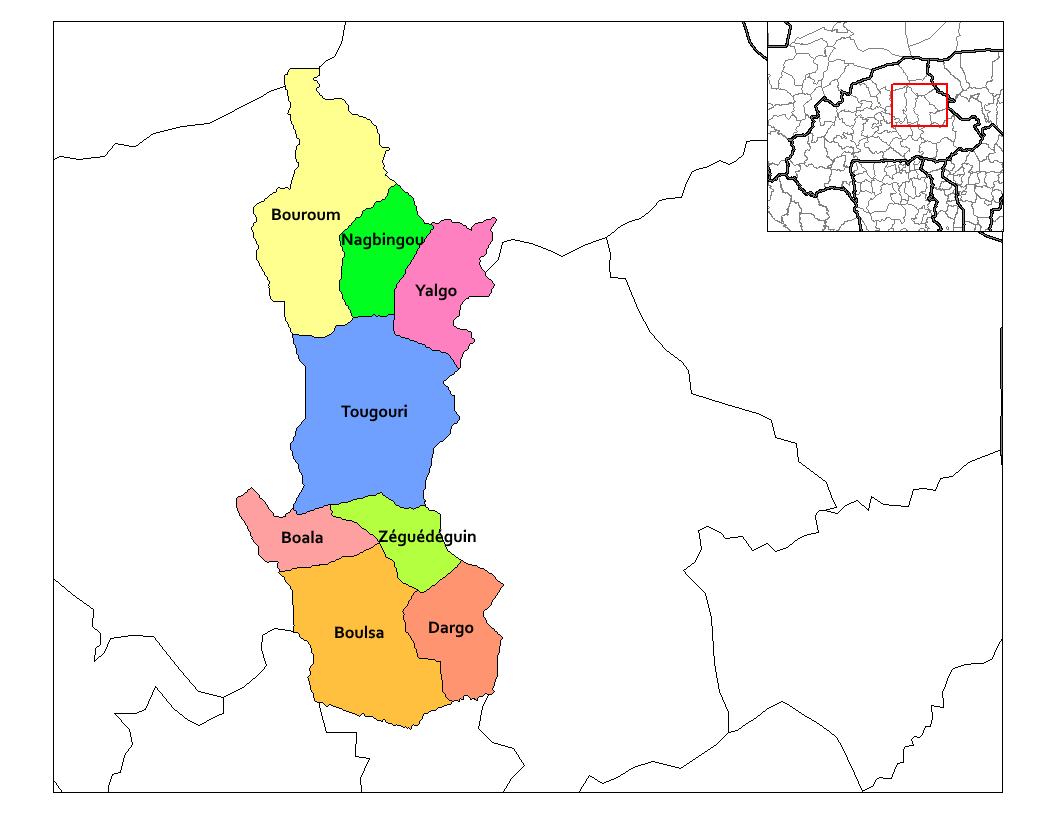
- Tougouri Department location in the province
- Country: Burkina Faso
- Region: Centre-Nord Region
- Province: Namentenga Province

Area
  - Total: 597 sq mi (1,545 km^{2})

Population (2019 census)
  - Total: 115,068
  - Density: 192.9/sq mi (74.48/km^{2})
- Time zone: UTC+0 (GMT 0)

The Tougouri Department is a department or commune of Namentenga Province in northern Burkina Faso. Its capital is the town of Tougouri.

== Towns and villages ==
- Tougouri (capital)
