= Yirgou massacre =

2019 terrorist attack in Burkina Faso

Coordinates: 13°51′11″N 0°59′13″W

- Part of Jihadist insurgency in Burkina Faso
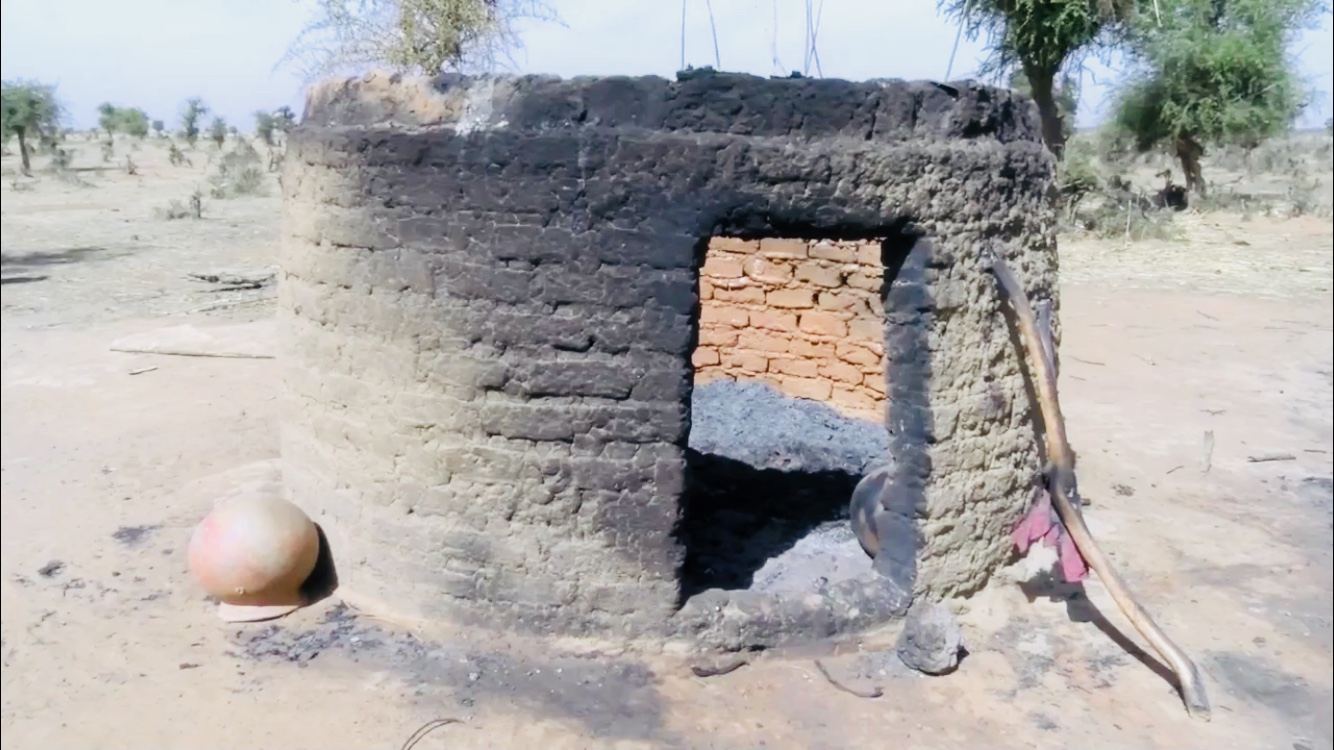
- Burned house in Yirgou
- Location: Yirgou, Barsalogho Department, Burkina Faso other villages in Barsalogho department
- Date: December 31, 2018 - January 2, 2019 (initial attack); January 2 - June 22 (reprisal attacks)
- Deaths: 46 (per Burkinabe government); 210 (per CISC and locals); 216 (per US State Department)
- Perpetrator: Koglweogo

On the night between December 31, 2018, and January 1, 2019, alleged Ansarul Islam jihadists attacked the village of Yirgou, in Barsalogho Department, Burkina Faso. While initial reports claimed the attack killed six people, including the village chief and his son, later reports and investigations showed up to 210 people were killed.

After the attack, fighters from the civilian-based ethnic Mossi militia Koglweogo launched reprisal attacks in ethnic Fulani areas in Barsalogho department, killing dozens of civilians and further intensifying the Fulani-Mossi conflict.

== Prelude ==
Since 2015, northern Burkina Faso has been embroiled in a jihadist insurgency with three main jihadist groups - Ansarul Islam, Jama'at Nasr al-Islam wal Muslimin (JNIM), and Islamic State in the Greater Sahara (ISGS). From 2015 to 2018, many attacks were low-level ambushes in the north, with larger attacks in the Burkinabe capital of Ouagadougou. After the Loroni ambush on December 27, 2018, President Roch Marc Christian Kaboré launched a state of emergency.

== Massacre ==
The first attack began on the night of December 31, when unknown armed fighters only described as "terrorists" by the Burkinabe government attacked the town of Yirgou. In the attack, the terrorists arrived in Yirgou on motorcycles, firing shots into the air before killing twelve people, including the village chief and his son. The attackers then retreated north, towards the province of Soum.

The violence in Yirgou was quickly followed by reprisal attacks from members of the Koglweogo, a Mossi militia group. The Koglweogo attacked Fulani herdsmen and villagers, accusing them of aiding the jihadists. According to the Collective Against the Impunity and Stigmatization of Communities, a Burkinabe human rights organization, seventeen villages were attacked by the Koglweogo in the reprisal attacks. Residents of Yirgou speaking to Voice of America claimed that the Koglweogo returned to Yirgou, and began burning the homes of Fulani civilians and then killing them.

The reprisal killings began on January 2, and most towns were around the outside of Barsalogho city. In the attacks, the Burkinabe government alleged 46 civilians were killed, although locals and the CISC claim that the real death toll is around 210–216. The attacks displaced dozens of thousands of civilians by April 2019, and most Burkinabe army attempts to mitigate the killings only ended up aiding the Koglweogo. The first town affected by the reprisals was Koulpagre, where a man named Diallo Alaye was kidnapped and tortured by the Koglweogo on January 28. The Koglweogo then killed 22 others in the town. Biguel-Kassaye was affected secondly, with nineteen civilians killed and much of the town fleeing towards the capital of Barsalogho. Other villages included Sagho and Guiendbila, where eighteen civilians were killed, Boundussi, where 13 were killed, Madou, where 7 were killed, Dakhan, where 17 were killed, Sago a second time, killing nine, Kougri Koulga, killing 19, Toekedogo, killing 19, Taate, killing fifteen, Boundossi again, killing five, Wiliwissou, killing 11, and Margou, Palal Sambo, and Talelgo, killing one each.

These reprisal attacks continued until June 22, 2019.
