= Bourasso Department =

Coordinates: 12°38′00″N 3°43′00″W

Bourasso
- Department
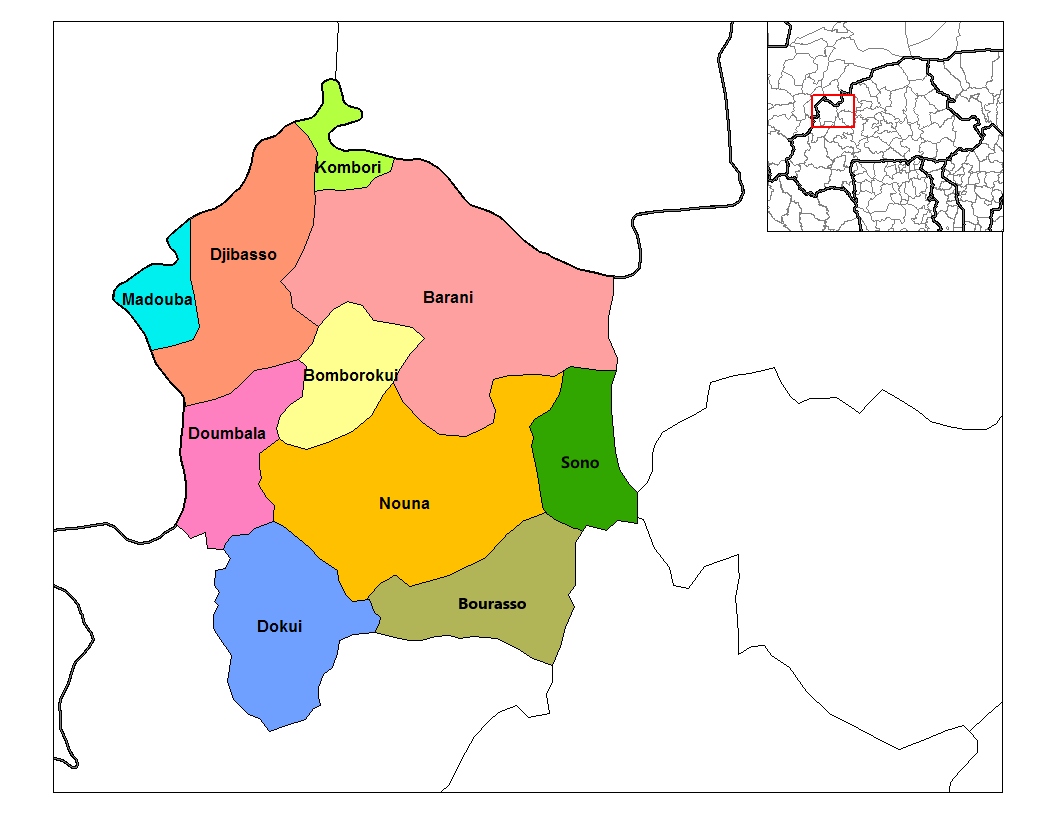
- Bourasso Department location in the province
- Country: Burkina Faso
- Province: Kossi Province

Area
  - Total: 268.8 sq mi (696.3 km^{2})

Population (2019 census)
  - Total: 20,115
  - Density: 74.82/sq mi (28.89/km^{2})
- Time zone: UTC+0 (GMT 0)

Bourasso is a department of Kossi Province in western Burkina Faso. It is in the Boucle du Mouhoun Region. The capital of the department is Bourasso. The population of the department in 2019 was 20,115.

== Towns and villages ==
- Bourasso (capital) (1,986 inhabitants)
- Barakuy (589 inhabitants)
- Biron-Bobo (150 inhabitants)
- Biron-Marka (847 inhabitants)
- Bouni (Burkina Faso) (658 inhabitants)
- Diamasso (508 inhabitants)
- Kamiankoro (1,185 inhabitants)
- Kodougou (1,147 inhabitants)
- Labarani (740 inhabitants)
- Lekuy (942 inhabitants)
- Lemini (Burkina Faso) (974 inhabitants)
- Nokuy (1,269 inhabitants)
- Sikoro (1,096 inhabitants)
- Sirakoro (148 inhabitants)
- Zonakuy (343 inhabitants)
