= Karma massacre =

Massacre in Burkina Faso

- Part of Jihadist insurgency in Burkina Faso
- Location: Karma, Yatenga Province, Burkina Faso
- Date: 20 April 2023; 7:30 a.m. - 2:00 p.m. UTC
- Deaths: 156
- Injuries: Unknown
- Perpetrator: 3rd Battalion of the Rapid Intervention Brigades
- No. of participants: ~100
- Motive: Revenge for April 2023 Aorema attack

The Karma massacre was a massacre in the village of Karma, Ouahigouya Department, Burkina Faso on April 20, 2023 perpetrated by soldiers of the Rapid Intervention Brigade's 3rd Battalion in response to the Aorema attack by jihadists that killed several soldiers and civilians a few days prior. The Karma massacre was one of the deadliest massacres of the jihadist insurgency in Burkina Faso, and up to that point the deadliest perpetrated by government forces.

== Background ==
Much of northern Burkina Faso has been the frontline of an insurgency waged by Jama'at Nasr al-Islam wal-Muslimin and the Islamic State in the Greater Sahara since 2015, with these groups intensifying their attacks on civilians seen as sympathetic to the government since 2019. These jihadist groups had been known to invade towns in Ouahigouya Department, including Karma and Aorema, multiple times over the past few years demanding zakat.

In the first few months of 2023, numerous human rights abuses were committed against civilians by Burkinabe soldiers. In February 2023, seven children and teenagers were executed by Burkinabe soldiers in Ouahigouya Department, and videos of the incidents were recovered by French newspaper Libération. In response, Burkinabe junta authorities expelled Liberation correspondent Agnes Faivre and Le Monde correspondent Sophie Douce.

The commune of Barga is made up of around 20 villages, and became a conflict zone between government forces and those of Jama'at Nasr al-Islam wal-Muslimin (JNIM) and the Burkinabe affiliate Ansarul Islam. In 2022 and 2023, the Fulani inhabitants of Barga fled the area, but the inhabitants of Karma - a majority-Mossi village - remained in support of the army. At the time of the attack, Karma had 400 residents.

Five days before the massacre, between 40 and 75 militants from the pro-government Volunteers for the Defense of the Homeland (VDP) were killed in a jihadist attack in Aorema, located close to Karma. Survivors from the Karma massacre reported that during the killings, a Burkinabe soldier told them "What they did to us, we are going to do to you."

== Massacre ==
At 7:30 am on April 20, over a hundred Burkinabe soldiers emblazoned with BIR3 patches, signifying that they were part of the 3rd Battalion of the Rapid Intervention Brigades, entered Karma on motorcycles and pickups. Eyewitness testimony confirmed the soldiers were part of the BIR3. The villagers welcomed the soldiers, but grew concerned when they began surrounding Karma.

One survivor stated that the soldiers entered civilian homes, rounded up the inhabitants, and took them outside. In the process, the soldiers demanded to see the villagers' IDs, and looted items such as phones and money. The soldiers shot at anyone who attempted to flee or hid in their homes. Residents were gathered in the town's main squares and shot, while others were killed in their homes. Women, children, and the elderly were among the victims.

The imam of the village was killed in front of the mosque. A group of 11 people were tied up and blindfolded, then killed on the side of a hill. Another group of primarily women and children were killed in the Moingayiri neighborhood, with some children being as young as 10 days old. Another group of 13 men was killed in a home's courtyard. People that weren’t rounded up in the village hid in their homes; attackers followed them before breaking in the door and killing them. Residents who were injured that attempted to run were killed. The attackers also looted shops, homes, and mosques, stealing valuable items, money, and at least 10 motorcycles.

Much of the village was torched by the soldiers, including forty granaries, seventeen barns, and forty homes. The killings lasted until 2:00 pm before the convoy, which was followed by a military helicopter, left for the village of Dinguiri. Later that day, six civilians were killed when the convoy stopped at Dinguiri. Two more were killed in the town of Mene, and another three killed on the road between Ouahigouya and Barga.

== Aftermath ==
=== Reactions ===
The massacre was "firmly condemned" by the Burkinabe government on April 28, which said it was "following the process of the investigation very closely." On May 4, junta leader Ibrahim Traoré declared he was waiting for the end of the investigation before drawing any conclusions for the massacre. Traore called for the perpetrators to be brought to justice.

On April 27, Umaro Sissoco Embaló, the president of Guinea-Bissau and chairman of ECOWAS, described the massacre as genocide. Burkinabe authorities condemned the designation, calling Embalo's statement "hasty and preemptory."

=== Casualties ===
On April 23, Lamine Kabore, the prosecutor of the Ouahigouya High Court, announced that sixty people had been killed in Karma by people "wearing the uniforms of our national armed forces." That same day, Liberation, citing local sources, estimated a death toll of between 150 and 200 people killed. RFI reported between 100 and 200 people killed. On April 25, the Office of the United Nations High Commissioner for Human Rights reported that at least 150 civilians had gone missing, and that the attack was carried out by armed men in uniform who were allegedly members of the defense and security forces, accompanied by paramilitary auxiliaries.

The Collective Against Impunity and Stigmatization of Communities (CISC), a Burkinabe human rights organization, put the death toll at 136, including 50 women and 21 children. The Burkinabe Movement for People and Humans' Rights announced a death toll of 147 killed, including 28 women and 45 children along with nine people killed in neighboring localities. Human Rights Watch reported a death toll of 156, including a list of names.

== See also ==
- List of massacres in Burkina Faso
