= Agence Ecofin =

Swiss information agency

- Type: Daily newspaper
- Founded: 2010; 16 years ago
- Language: French
- Website: https://www.agenceecofin.com/

Agence Ecofin is an information agency specializing in public management and the African economy.

== History ==
The Agence Ecofin was founded in 2010 in Geneva to meet a growing need for sectoral and specialized information on African economies. The agency's website was launched in June 2011.

== Activities ==
The Ecofin Agency presents, on a web platform, several daily news feeds on strategic economic sectors for the African continent: Public management, Finance, Agriculture and Agro-industry, Electricity, Hydrocarbons, Mines, Telecom, Communication, etc.

== Audience ==
The Ecofin Agency receives an average of 2 million visits per month (Webalizer) for 260,000 unique visitors. The agency's daily letters have 54,000 subscribers. The agency's information is also available on smartphone or tablet applications (Apple and Android), as well as on social networks like Facebook and Twitter.
