= Tankoulounga =

Village in Zimtenga Department, Burkina Faso

Coordinates: 13°28′N 1°28′W

- Interactive map of Tankoulounga
- Country: Burkina Faso
- Region: Centre-Nord Region
- Province: Bam Province
- Department: Zimtenga Department

Population (2019)
  - Total: 968
- Time zone: UTC+0 (GMT)

Tankoulounga is a village in the Zimtenga Department of Bam Province in northern-central Burkina Faso.

Population
Year	Pop.	±%
1985	194	—
2006	455	+134.5%
2019 (estimate)	968	+112.7%
