= Loroni ambush =

2018 battle in Burkina Faso

- Part of Jihadist insurgency in Burkina Faso
Date	December 27, 2018
Location	Loroni, Burkina Faso
Result	JNIM victory

Belligerents
Burkina Faso	Jama'at Nasr al-Islam wal Muslimin

Commanders and leaders
Ouattara Issouf †	Unknown

Strength
10 (Toeni brigade); Unknown (Dedougou reinforcements)	Unknown

Casualties and losses
10 killed 3-8 injured	Unknown

On December 27, 2018, jihadists from Jama'at Nasr al-Islam wal-Muslimin attacked Burkinabe soldiers in Loroni, northern Burkina Faso, killing ten soldiers. The attack was the deadliest incident for Burkinabe forces since the Nassoumbou attack in 2016.

== Background ==
Northern Burkina Faso has been embroiled in a jihadist insurgency since 2015, with the Mali-based al-Qaeda affiliate Jama'at Nasr al-Islam wal-Muslimin (JNIM), Niger-based Islamic State in the Greater Sahara, and homegrown Ansarul Islam controlling swathes of territory and attacking civilians and Burkinabe forces. These groups had been expanding throughout Burkina Faso between 2017 and 2018, with attacks on the capital of Ouagadougou killing eight soldiers in March 2018 and Burkinabe forces defeating an Ansarul Islam contingent in Inata in October 2018.

== Ambush ==
At about 4am on December 27, 2018, a primary school in Loroni was set ablaze. A ten-man patrol from the Toeni Territorial Gendarmerie Brigade led by Warrant Officer Ouattara Issouf and based twenty-five kilometers from Loroni, arrived in the town at 9am that day for a security mission to find the arsonists. However, when the men reached the entrance of Loroni, their convoy was ambushed by a group of jihadists. Three gendarmes were killed immediately, and the other seven called for reinforcements and fought back against the attackers. All ten men were killed, and a convoy of reinforcements from Dédougou hit an IED on the way to Loroni, injuring several soldiers.

== Aftermath ==
JNIM claimed responsibility for the ambush the day after the attack. In their statement, JNIM claimed to have killed nine soldiers, although the Burkinabe government reported that ten gendarmes were killed and three were injured. RFI reported that eight soldiers were injured in the IED blast. The attack was the deadliest for Burkinabe soldiers since the Nassoumbou attack that kickstarted Ansarul Islam's insurgency in 2016.
