= Namissiguima Department, Yatenga =

Coordinates: 13.6000°N 2.2164°W

Namissiguima
- Department
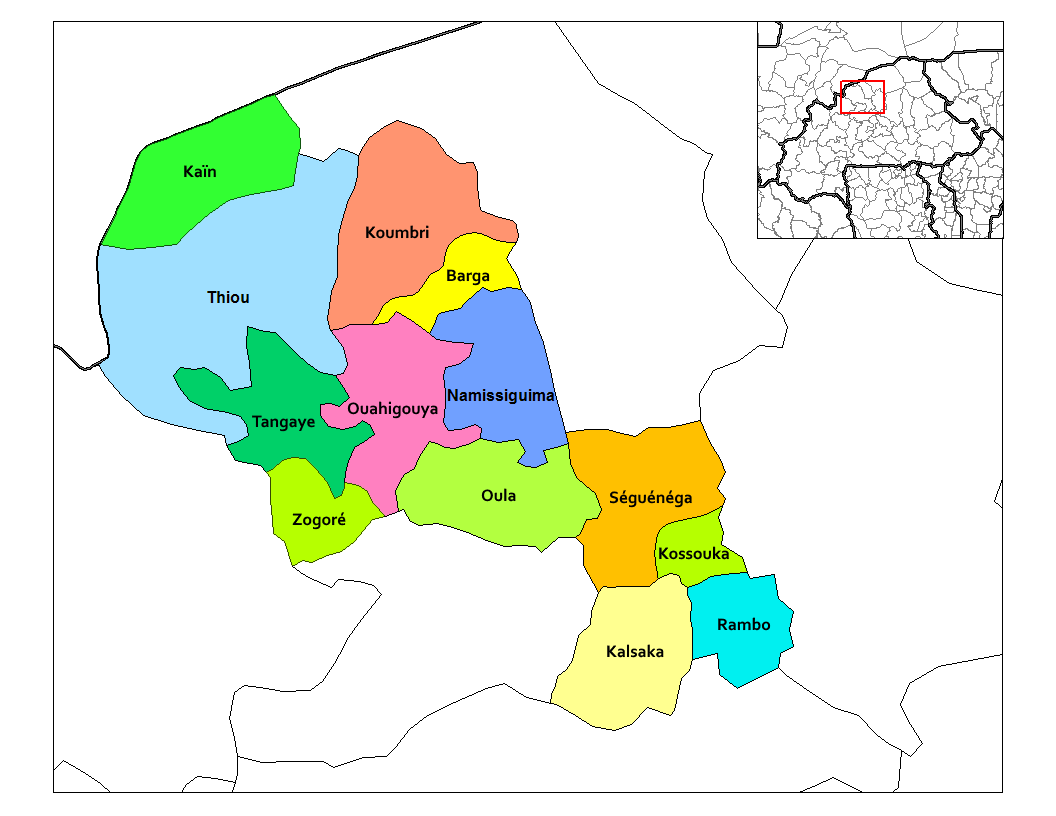
- Namissiguima Department, Yatenga location in the province
- Country: Burkina Faso
- Province: Yatenga Province

Area
  - Total: 192.2 sq mi (497.8 km^{2})

Population (2019 census)
  - Total: 58,830
  - Density: 306.1/sq mi (118.2/km^{2})
- Time zone: UTC+0 (GMT 0)

Namissiguima is a department or commune of Yatenga Province in northern Burkina Faso. Its capital lies at the town of Namissiguima.

== Towns and villages ==
- Loungue
