= Nondin and Soro massacres =

2024 massacres in Burkina Faso

- Part of the Jihadist insurgency in Burkina Faso
- Location: Nondin and Soro, Yatenga Province, Burkina Faso
- Date: 25 February 2024 c. 8:30 a.m. – c. 9:30 a.m. (GMT)
- Target: Civilians
- Attack type: Massacre, mass execution
- Deaths: 223
- Injuries: Unknown
- Perpetrator: Burkina Faso Armed Forces (denied)
- No. of participants: 100+
- Motive: Revenge killings for alleged civilian compliance with jihadists

On 25 February 2024, soldiers of the Burkina Faso Armed Forces summarily executed around 223 civilians, including 56 children, in Yatenga Province, northern Burkina Faso. The massacres took place in the villages of Nondin and Soro, and were perpetrated in retaliation for alleged civilian collaboration with jihadist militias. Human Rights Watch (HRW) described the killings as one of the worst Burkinabe army abuses since 2015.

== Background ==
=== Islamist insurgency in Burkina Faso ===
Burkina Faso, a country located in the Sahel region in western Africa, has fought an armed conflict against Islamist insurgents such as Al-Qaeda and the Islamic State since 2015, as a result of the spillover of the war in neighboring Mali. The conflict has killed around 20,000 people and displaced 2 million others.

In 2022, two military coups took place in the nation, resulting in Ibrahim Traoré seizing power. Traoré has pledged to quell the insurgency, however violence only escalated under his administration, causing over a third of the nation's territory to fall to Islamists. Burkina Faso has been accused by various human rights groups of perpetrating numerous human rights violations, including mass killings and forced disappearances of civilians.

=== Prelude to the massacres ===
On 24 and 25 February, Islamist groups carried out coordinated attacks throughout Burkina Faso, targeting mainly military structures such as barracks and military bases. They also targeted places of worship, killing 29 in two attacks on a mosque and Catholic church. On 25 February, at 7:00 a.m., Islamists carried out a major attack against a Burkinabe military base in Ouahigouya before fleeing towards Thiou district. Soldiers of the Rapid Intervention Battalion responded, chasing the militants and "neutralizing" the ones who were unable to flee.

== Massacres ==
Around 30 minutes prior to the massacre, armed Islamists passed through Nondin yelling "Allah Akbar" (God is great). Between 8:30 and 9:00, a military convoy consisting of pickup trucks, motorbikes, and two armored vehicles arrived in the village. The convoy held at least 100 soldiers armed with Kalashnikovs and heavy weaponry. Upon arrival, soldiers went door-to-door ordering residents to show their identity cards and then ordering them to leave their homes. They were then rounded up into groups. Soldiers then indiscriminately opened fire, targeting the groups and villagers attempting to hide or flee. A 34-year-old woman who was shot on her leg said that the army accused them of being complicit with jihadists and being uncooperative with the army by not informing them of the jihadists' movements before firing. Forty-four people, including 20 children, were killed in Nondin.

Around an hour later, soldiers arrived at Soro, around 5 kilometres (3.1 mi) from Nondin. A similar scenario played out, where soldiers rounded up civilians, separated them into groups based on gender, and then shot at them and those who attempted to hide or flee. A villager said that the soldiers called for the residents and began opening fire as people were moving towards them, killing 179, including 36 children and four pregnant women.

Some survivors of the attack dug mass graves for most of the victims, compiling two lists of names which were acquired by HRW. Eight graves were dug in Soro and three in Nondin. Other bodies were buried separately as they were recovered days after the massacres.

== Aftermath ==
=== Investigations ===
A day after the massacres, family members of the victims traveled to the gendarmerie brigade in Ouahigouya and made a statement about the attacks, prompting high court prosecutor Aly Benjamin Coulibaly to announce an investigation. He vowed to assist in finding the perpetrators.

The HRW, citing reports from 23 witnesses, three activists, three members of international organizations, and three other people, concluded that the Burkina Faso Armed Forces was responsible for the massacres. It also verified photos and videos of the aftermath showing the deaths and injured survivors. HRW noted that as soldiers chased down the jihadists who attacked the Rapid Intervention Battalion in the morning, they requested for drones to not follow them, possibly indicating that they did not want the drones to record their actions. HRW urged for Burkinabe authorities to open a UN-backed investigation. Executive director Tirana Hassan said that the killings were part of a series of mass killings of civilians by Burkina Faso throughout their fight against the insurgency, and labeled them as possible crimes against humanity.

=== Burkinabe response ===
Burkinabe Communications Minister Rimtalba Jean Emmanuel Ouedraogo rejected and condemned the accusations, calling them baseless. He also assured that an investigation was opened into the killings. Burkina Faso said that the accusations were part of a media campaign to discredit its forces. Burkina Faso's Superior Council for Communication suspended 13 news agencies in total for their coverage of the massacres. On 25 April, it suspended access to BBC and Voice of America for two weeks. Two days later, it blocked Agence de Presse Africaine, Agence Ecofin, Deutsche Welle, The Guardian, Le Monde, and Ouest-France, "until further notice", and TV5Monde for two weeks. Burkina Faso communications spokesperson Tonssira Myrian Corine Sanou warned other media organizations to not report on the event.

== Reactions ==
The United States and United Kingdom said they were gravely concerned about the reports of massacres by Burkina Faso's armed forces and called for a probe. Their response sparked protests outside the US embassy in Ouagadougou, where hundreds of shopkeepers and workers marched towards the building with Burkinabe and Russian flags, chanting anti-imperialist slogans and defending their armed forces.

== See also ==
- 2024 Barsalogho massacre
- Karma massacre
