= Kaïn Department =

Coordinates: 14°3′N 2°45′W

Kain
- Department
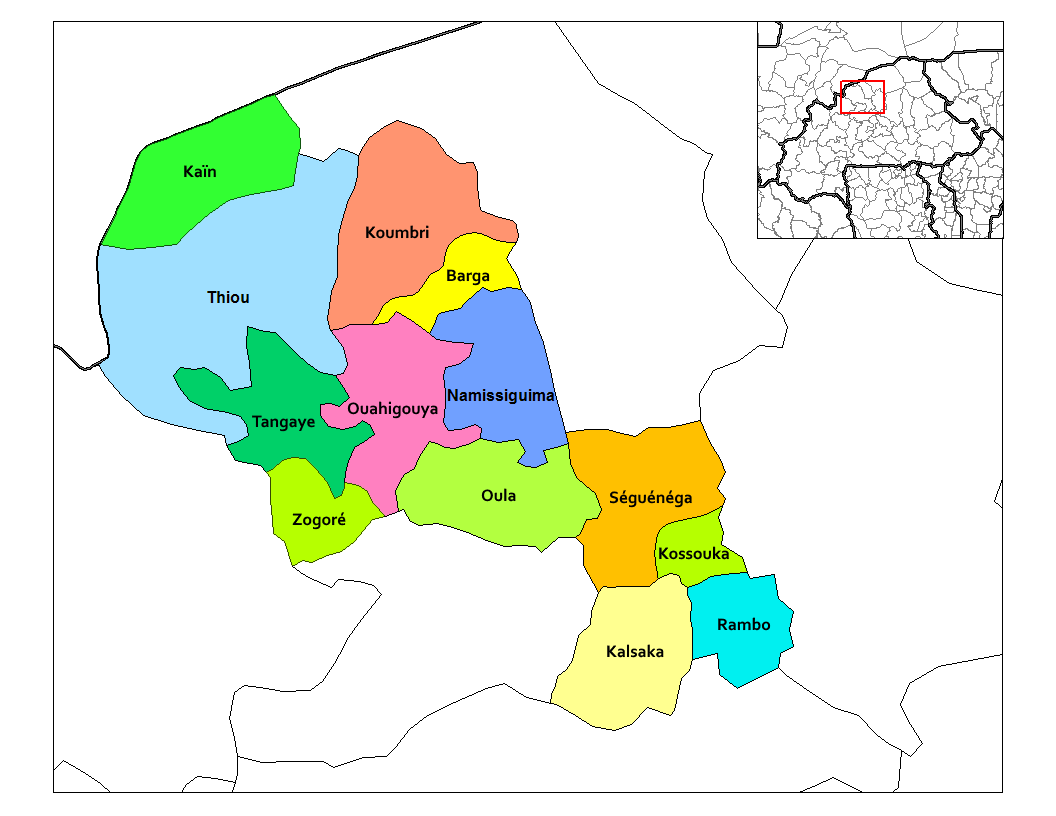
- Kain Department location in the province
- Country: Burkina Faso
- Province: Yatenga Province

Area
  - Total: 301.2 sq mi (780.2 km^{2})

Population (2019 census)
  - Total: 11,778
  - Density: 39.10/sq mi (15.10/km^{2})
- Time zone: UTC+0 (GMT 0)

Kain is a department or commune of Yatenga Province in northern Burkina Faso. Its capital lies at the town of Kain.
