= Ouahigouya Department =

Coordinates: 13.5670°N 2.4170°W

Ouahigouya
- Department
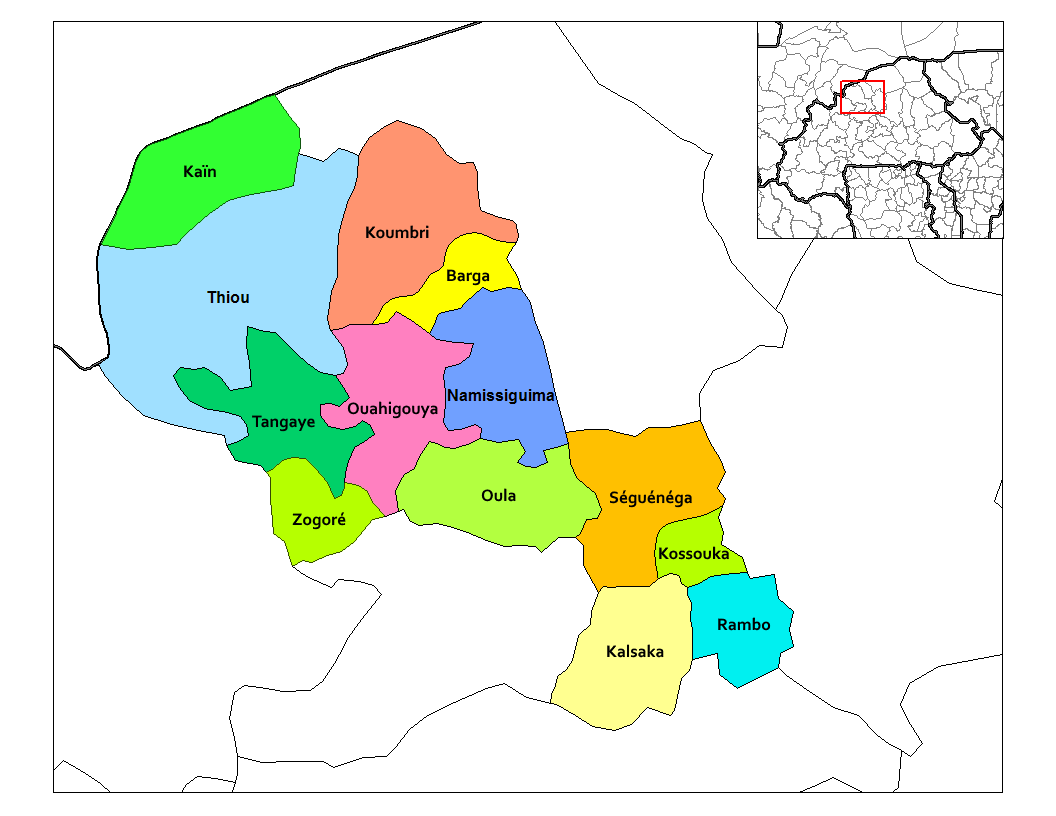
- Ouahigouya Department location in the province
- Country: Burkina Faso
- Province: Yatenga Province

Area
  - Department: 190 sq mi (492 km^{2})

Population (2019 census)
  - Department: 199,387
  - Density: 1,050/sq mi (405/km^{2})
  - Urban: 124,587
- Time zone: UTC+0 (GMT 0)

Ouahigouya is a department or commune of Yatenga Province in northern Burkina Faso. Its capital is the town of Ouahigouya. The department is coloured pink towards the centre of the Yatenga Province map, on the map just to one's right.

== Towns and villages ==
The department of Ouahigouya is composed of the capital of same name, and another 37 villages: Aorema, Bapore, Bassaouassa, Bembela, Bissigaye, Bogoya, Bolongo, Bouri, Cissin, Ippo, Issigui, Komsila, Kouri, Lilligome, Mopeleguin, Mouni, Ouattinoma, Ouedrancin, Passogo, Pirgo, Poedogo, Rallo, Ramesse, Rikou, Risci, Roba, Sambtinga, Saye, Sissamba, Sodin, Somiaga, Soubo, Toessin, Yabonsgo, Youba, Zamioro e Zimba.
