= Barsalogho Department =

Barsalogho
- Department
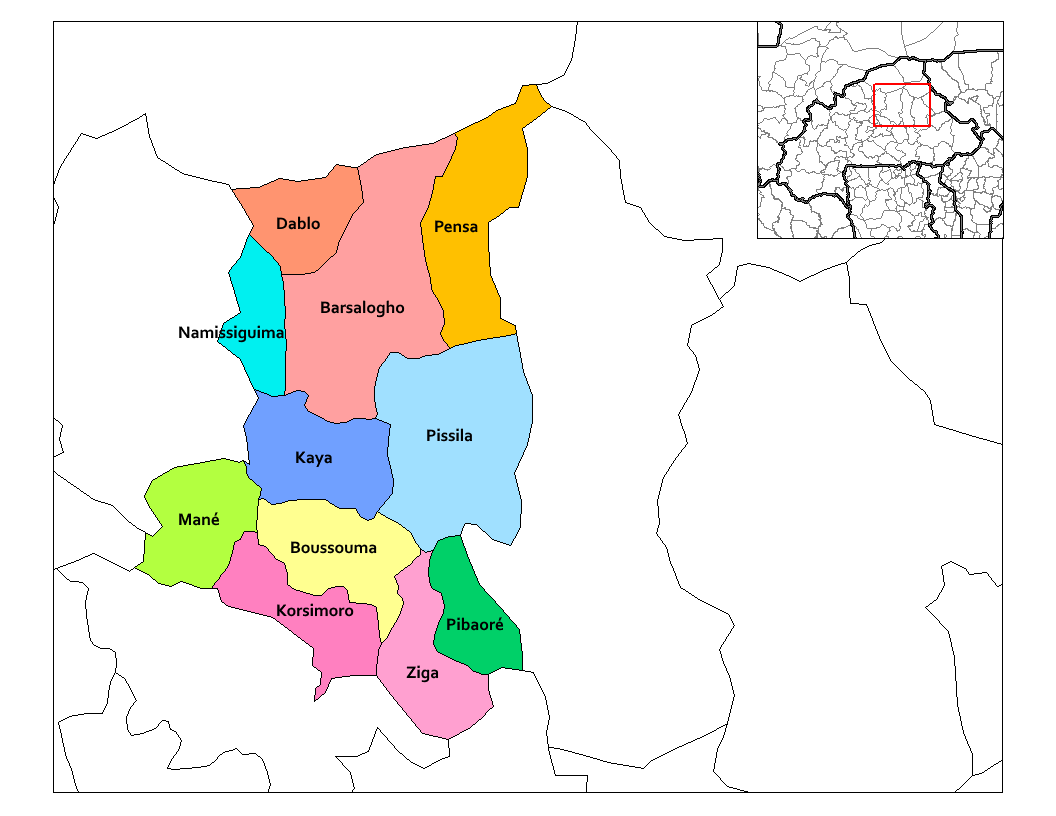
- Barsalogho Department location in the province
- Coordinates: 13°25′07″N 1°03′21″W
- Country: Burkina Faso
- Province: Sanmatenga Province
- Seat: Barsalogho

Area
  - Total: 697 sq mi (1,804 km^{2})

Population (2019 census)
  - Total: 98,553
  - Density: 141.5/sq mi (54.63/km^{2})
- Time zone: UTC+0 (GMT 0)

Barsalogho is a department or commune of Sanmatenga Province in central Burkina Faso. Its capital lies at the town of Barsalogho.

== Towns and villages ==
The Department has 43 main villages, and twelve attached sub-villages. Population figures are from 2006.

- Bangmiougou (1903)
- Bangrin (831)
- Basma (1890)
- Barsalogho (10108, seat)
- Biguélé (1048)
- Bollé (2615)
- Boulsbaongo (1140)
- Darkoa (1009)
- Foubé (4882)
- Gabou (2493)
- Goenega (2111)
- Guiendbila (Note: Guiendbila administratively and statistically groups together the villages of Bafina, Bundissin, Kékobo, Loughary, Poéssin, Rokoutin, Sagho, and Woskossogho, which nevertheless have their own village representatives on the departmental and communal councils. Guiendbila had 410 inhabitants strictly speaking, but all eight attached villages and Guiendbila had a total population of 7,135 in 2006.) (410)
  - Bafina (787)
  - Bundissin (743)
  - Kékobo (1000)
  - Loughary (600)
  - Poéssin (626)
  - Rokoutin (626)
  - Sagho (1600)
  - Woskossogho (743)
- Kamsé (385)
- Kamsé-Peulh (602)
- Kassaye (1882)
- Kogoyendé (1459)
- Kondibito (1476)
- Kondibito-Peulh (380)
- Korko-Mossi (4452)
- Korko-Peulh (754)
- Madou (1188)
- Nagraogo (2724)
- Nagraogo-Foulcé (1869)
- Nakombogo (786)
- Nongo (Note: Nongo administratively includes Yimboulsa for a total population of 1,344 in 2006.) (441)
  - Yimboulsa (903)
- Nongo-Peulh (431)
- Sanba (72)
- Sanba-Peulh (732)
- Sidiga (Note: Sidiga administratively includes Zénzèba for a total population of 2,023 in 2006.) (906)
  - Zénzèba (1117)
- Sidogo (2565)
- Somyalka (1809)
- Soudougou (1029)
- Tamassogo (652)
- Tanghin (464)
- Tankienga (1856)
- Tatoukou (Note: Tatoukou administratively and statistically groups together the villages of Biou and Koulholé, which nevertheless have their own village representatives on the departmental and communal councils. Tatoukou had 516 inhabitants strictly speaking, but all three attached villages and Tatoukou had a total population of 2,199 in 2006.) (516)
  - Biou (968)
  - Koulholé (715)
- Toécé (1203)
- Toyendé (904)
- Toekédogo (721)
- Yantéga (1764)
- Yirgou (991)
- Zimsa (1333)
- Zongo (1705)

== August 2024 attacks ==
On 24 August 2024, Jama'at Nasr al-Islam wal-Muslimin, an Islamic terrorist group with links to al-Qaeda, attacked and massacred more than 600 people in Barsalogho and injured more than 300, mainly civilians while the Burkina Faso Armed Forces fled. This attack is part of an ongoing series of terrorist insurgencies within Burkina Faso and the Sahel Region as a whole.
