= Islamist insurgency in Burkina Faso =

Ongoing insurgency in Burkina Faso (2015–present)

- Part of the War in the Sahel and the spillover of the Mali War
- Map in October 2024
Date	23 August 2015 – present (11 years, 2 months, 4 weeks and 2 days)
Location	Burkina Faso
Status	Ongoing
Territorial changes	Around 30% of the country controlled by jihadist forces (Note: The Burkinabe government states that they control 75%, while Sahel analysts state that jihadists control 30%.)

Belligerents
Alliance of Sahel States; Burkina Faso; Armed Forces; VDP; Koglweogos (civilian militias); Mali; Niger; France (until 2023); Russia (since 2024); Africa Corps; SADAT (alleged, since 2024)	Al-Qaeda; JNIM (2017–present); AQIM (until 2017); Al-Mourabitoun; Ansarul Islam (2016–2017); Ansar Dine (until 2017); Islamic State; ISSP (2022–); ISWAP (until 2022)

Commanders and leaders
(Burkina Faso) Roch Marc Christian Kabore (2015–2022); (Burkina Faso) Paul-Henri Sandaogo Damiba (Jan. 2022 – Sep. 2022); (Burkina Faso) Ibrahim Traoré (Sep. 2022–present); (Burkina Faso) David Kabre (2022–2023); (Burkina Faso) Gilbert Noël Ouédraogo (2021–2022); (Burkina Faso) Moussa Diallo (2023–present); (Burkina Faso) Célestin Simpore (2023–present); (France) Emmanuel Macron (until 2023); (Russia) Vladimir Putin (2024-present) (Russia) Andrey Averyanov (2024-present) (Russia) Yunus-bek Yevkurov (2024-present)	Ibrahim Malam Dicko † (2016–2017); Iyad Ag Ghali (2012–present); Sedane Ag Hita (2010–present); Abdoul Salam Dicko (2017–present); Adnan Abu Walid al-Sahrawi †; Abu al-Bara' al-Sahrawi

Casualties and losses
- 25,000 dead (estimates) 2.06 million displaced

Since August 2015, an insurgency has been fought between the government of Burkina Faso and Islamist militant groups, including Jama'at Nasr al-Islam wa al-Muslimin (JNIM), Ansarul Islam and the Islamic State – Sahel Province (IS–SP). It is estimated that 30% of the country is controlled by jihadist forces. The insurgency originated in the northern area of Burkina Faso amid the broader Mali war, and has grown to affect most of the country.

The conflict intensified after 2016, when Ansarul Islam carried out large scaled attacks in northern Burkina Faso, causing violence to spread into the eastern and central regions. Islamic groups have targeted military bases, civilians, schools, religious leaders and local officials, while government forces and allied militias have been accused of extrajudicial killings and ethnic reprisals, particularly against Fulani communities. The insurgency has contributed to intercommunal violence and ongoing humanitarian crisis.

This led to two military coups in 2022 that brought Lieutenant Colonel Paul-Henri Sandaogo Damiba and later Captain Ibrahim Traoré to power. From that time onwards, Burkina Faso kept distance from France and other western countries, strengthening security cooperation with Mali, Niger and Russia. Despite military offensives and mobilization of the Volunteers for the defense of the Homeland, Islamic groups continue to control large areas of the country.

The insurgency has led to the displacement of over 2 million people and the deaths of at least 20,000 civilians and combatants. Large areas in Burkina Faso are suffering from severe food insecurity and disruption of public services. The war has been interpreted as being the Burkinabé theatre of the War in the Sahel.

== Background ==
Following its incorporation into French West Africa in the late nineteenth century, Burkina Faso (then Upper Volta) remained one of France's least-developed colonies. French colonial authorities concentrated administrative and economic development in the country's central and southern regions, while much of the sparsely populated Sahel in the north received comparatively little investment. State authority in these northern areas often relied on traditional and religious leaders, and cross-border trade and migration with present-day Mali and Niger continued largely uninterrupted. Following independence in 1960, many of these regional disparities persisted, with the northern provinces remaining among the poorest and least developed parts of the country.

Islam first spread into present-day Burkina Faso between the 11th and 15th centuries through trans-Saharan trade routes and the expansion of the Mali and Songhai Empires. By the colonial period, Islam had become the predominant religion in much of the country's north and east, while Christianity was more prevalent in the central and southern regions due in part to French missionary activity. For most of Burkina Faso's modern history, relations between Muslims, Christians, and practitioners of traditional African religions remained largely peaceful, with Sufi brotherhoods playing a prominent role in religious life. Beginning in the late twentieth century, however, Salafism gradually gained influence through foreign-funded mosques, religious schools, and preachers, particularly in northern Burkina Faso. Although the vast majority of Salafi organizations rejected violence, their growth coincided with broader ideological shifts occurring across the Sahel.

Between independence and the 1980s, Burkina Faso experienced repeated military coups and political instability. The country underwent major political and economic reforms under President Thomas Sankara, who ruled from 1983 until his assassination in 1987. Sankara's government sought to strengthen state institutions, expand education and healthcare, reduce the influence of traditional elites, and promote national self-sufficiency. His administration also attempted to extend government authority into remote rural regions, though many of these reforms proved short-lived following his death.

Blaise Compaoré seized power in 1987 and ruled Burkina Faso for twenty-seven years. During his presidency, the country gained a reputation as one of the more politically stable states in West Africa despite increasing instability elsewhere in the region. Compaoré pursued an active foreign policy, frequently acting as a mediator in conflicts across West Africa, including civil wars in Liberia, Sierra Leone, Côte d'Ivoire, and later the Mali War. His government maintained close relations with France, the United States, and neighboring governments while also cultivating informal ties with numerous armed groups operating throughout the Sahel.

Throughout the 1990s and 2000s, militant Islamist organizations expanded across North Africa and the Sahara. Veterans of the Algerian Civil War reorganized under the Salafist Group for Preaching and Combat (GSPC), which pledged allegiance to al-Qaeda in 2007 and became al-Qaeda in the Islamic Maghreb (AQIM). Rather than relying solely on ideological support, AQIM established itself in the Sahel through kidnapping, smuggling, extortion, and alliances with local tribes and criminal networks. Its operations increasingly extended southward into Mali, Mauritania, Niger and Burkina Faso. Unlike neighboring Mali and Niger, Burkina Faso experienced relatively few attacks during this period.

Despite its reputation for stability, Burkina Faso faced longstanding structural challenges that left part of the country vulnerable to future insurgency. Northern and eastern Burkina Faso experienced chronic poverty, limited access to education and healthcare, poor transportation infrastructure, high youth unemployment, and minimal state presence. Environmental factors also contributed to this growing insecurity. The Sahel experienced recurring droughts, desertification, irregular rainfall, and declining agricultural productivity throughout the late twentieth and early twenty-first centuries. These pressures intensified disputes between sedentary farming communities and predominantly pastoral Fulani herders. Although such conflicts had historically been managed through customary mediation, weakening local institutions and the increasing availability of firearms made disputes increasingly violent. Militant groups later exploited these local grievances by presenting themselves as protectors of these communities and offering alternative systems of justice in areas where state institutions were largely absent.

The Fulani became disproportionately affected by the expanding insurgency. Longstanding discrimination, disputes over land use, allegations of cattle theft, and accusations of collaboration with jihadists contributed to deteriorating relations between the Fulani communities and both state security forces and local self-defense militias. Islamist groups, particularly Katiba Macina, actively recruited among marginalized populations by exploiting these grievances, though recruitment also occurred among members of numerous other ethnic communities.

Following the Tuareg rebellion led by the National Movement for the Liberation of Azaqad (MNLA), a military coup in Bamako weakened the Malian state, allowing Islamist organizations including Ansar Dine, the Movement for Oneness and Jihad in West Africa (MUJAO), AQIM, and later Al-Mourabitoun to seize control of much of northern Mali. Burkina Faso played a prominent diplomatic role during the conflict, hosting negotiations between the Malian government and Tuareg rebel factions while simultaneously contributing troops to the African-led International Support Mission to Mali (AFISMA). Nevertheless, the conflict accelerated the flow of fighters, weapons, and extremist networks throughout the central Sahel. Militant groups increasingly established bases in the borderlands separating Mali, Niger, and Burkina Faso, where government authority remained weak.

The years following the Mali intervention also witnessed significant organizational changes among jihadist groups, expanding operations into areas bordering Burkina Faso. Two years later, Ansar Dine, Katiba Macina, Al-Mourabitoun, and AQIM's Sahara branch merged to form Jama'at Nasr al-Islam wal Muslimin (JNIM), creating a unified al-Qaeda affiliate across much of the Sahel.

Political instability within Burkina Faso further weakened the country's security apparatus. In October 2014, Compaoré was overthrown after attempting to amend the constitution to extend his rule. His departure ended many of the informal intelligence, mediation, and patronage networks that had contributed to regional stability in Burkina Faso. The transitional authorities inherited security institutions that had long prioritized regime protection over counterinsurgency and border security, and during this phase, in September 2015, elements of the Regiment of Presidential Security (RSP), loyal to Compaoré, launched a coup against the transitional government. Although the coup collapsed within a week, it diverted precious resources away from maintaining the regional stability in Burkina Faso; and by late 2015, Islamist militants based in Mali had begun carrying out increasingly frequent cross-border raids into northern Burkina Faso. These attacks coincided with the expansion of both JNIM-affiliated factions and Islamic State-aligned militants into Burkina Faso's northern and eastern provinces. Taking advantage of weak state authority, local grievances, and very porous borders, militant organizations gradually established a sustained insurgency that expanded across much of the country over the following years, making Burkina Faso one of the principal theaters of jihadist violence in the Sahel.

== Timeline ==
=== 2015–2016 ===
On 23 August 2015, the insurgency in the Maghreb spread to Burkina Faso, beginning with an attack on a gendarmerie by alleged Boko Haram members. Between August 2015 and October 2016, seven different posts were attacked across the country, leaving 15 dead and 11 injured. On 9 October, three gendarmes, one rebel, and one civilian were killed during a battle in Samorogouan, Hauts-Bassins. On 31 May 2016, three police officers were shot dead in Intangom. On 1 September 2016, a team of two to four jihadists murdered a customs officer and a civilian in Markoye, injuring three others. Two days later, Sahrawi terrorist Adnane Abou Walid Al-Sahraoui accepted responsibility for the attack.

On 15 January 2016, terrorists attacked the capital city of Ouagadougou, killing 30 people. Al-Qaeda in the Islamic Maghreb and Al-Mourabitoune both took responsibility.

=== 2017 ===
In 2016, the number of attacks spiked after a new group Ansarul Islam, led by imam Ibrahim Malam Dicko, was founded. The group is particularly active at the border territories of Mali and Burkina Faso. A large proportion of attacks have been focused on Soum province. On 16 December, Ansarul Islam killed dozens of people in the attack on Nassoumbou. On the first of January 2017, an Imam and defect from Asarul Islam was assassinated in Tongomayel. Two months later, a teacher was murdered in the village of Kourfayel Samorogouan, Soum province. On 22 March, the leader of Ansarul Islam, Harouna Dicko, was shot dead in Pétéga by security forces. By this point, a total of 70 people, the majority of them soldiers, gendarmes and police officers, had been killed in a series of 20 attacks.

Between 27 March – 10 April 2017, the governments of Mali, France, and Burkina Faso launched a joint operation named "Operation Panga", composed of 1,300 soldiers from the three countries, in Fhero forest, near the Burkina Faso-Mali border, considered a sanctuary for Ansarul Islam. On 5 April, Jama'at Nasr al-Islam wal Muslimin detonated an improvised explosive device on a French military vehicle, injuring two people. An allied detachment found the militants during a search operation, but the armed Islamist group members attacked again, killing a French soldier. During the ensuing twelve days of searching, two jihadists were killed, eight were taken prisoner, and up to 200 suspects were arrested. The French forces quickly returned to the offensive, with several successful raids against military targets.

On 27 May, in Pétéga, a retired policeman was assassinated by militants. On the night of 2 June, at least five people, including a couple and their child, were murdered in targeted attacks across Soum province. On 9 June, military forces rounded up 74 villagers in the town of Djibo accused of collaborating with Ansarul Islam. Several of the villagers were tortured, two fatally. On 12 July, a shootout between government forces and jihadist militants took place, with no casualties.

The head of Ansarul Islam, Ibrahim Malam Dicko, was killed in June 2017. He was succeeded by Jafar Dicko. On the night of 24 July, five members of Ansarul Islam were assassinated in the villages of Ndidja, Sibé and Neyba, Soum province, possibly by the new leadership.

On 14 August 2017, a two militants entered a restaurant in Ouagadougou, murdering 18 people before they were shot dead by Burkinabè authorities.

On 17 August, a Burkinabè army vehicle rolled over an explosive in Touronata, killing three people and injuring two more. On 15 September, three men, including an imam and a local village chief, were slain by militants in Soum province. On 23 September, seven soldiers were killed in a mine explosion. Three days later, two gendarmes were killed in an ambush by jihadist militants. On 9 November, the Burkina Faso Armed Forces killed 12 jihadists in the village of Ariel.

=== 2018 ===
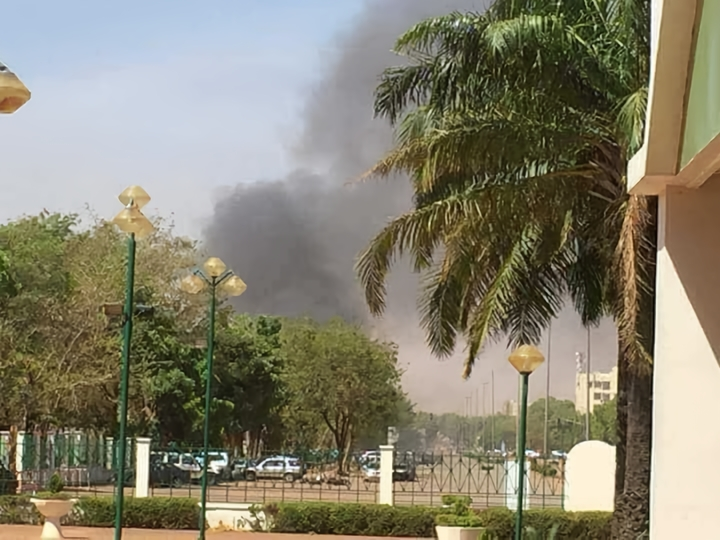
Smoke rises from Embassy of France in Burkina Faso, 2 March 2018

On 2 March 2018, Jama'at Nasr al-Islam wal Muslimin attacked the French embassy in Ouagadougou as well as the general staff of the Burkinabè army. Eight soldiers and eight militants were killed, and a further 61 soldiers and 24 civilians were injured.

In 2018, the insurgency spread to the east of the country. Jihadist militants launched three attacks on 13 June: in Tindangou, against a police checkpoint, and on the police station and gendarmerie brigade of Comin-Yanga. On 12 August, six people were killed by jihadist militants in a bombing in Boungou, near Fada N'Gourma. On the night of 27 August, eight Burkinabe soldiers were killed in a bombing likely carried out by jihadist militants Pama. On the night of 14 September, Jihadist militants murdered nine people in the villages of Diabiga and Kompiembiga including a religious leader. Rebels kidnapped three employees in a gold mine – an Indian, a South-African and a Burkinabé, killing three Burkinabé gendarmes in the process. On 4 October, six Burkinabé soldiers died after their military convoy ran over an explosive device. That night, an army of forty Islamists launched an attack against local gendarmes in Inata. The following day, six policemen died in a mine bombing near Sollé.

In early October, the Armed Forces of Burkina Faso launched a major military operation in the country's East, with French support. On 3 December, Burkinabé gendarmes repelled an ambush at Bougui, ten kilometres from Fada N'Gourma, killing six militants and injuring another.

=== 2019 ===
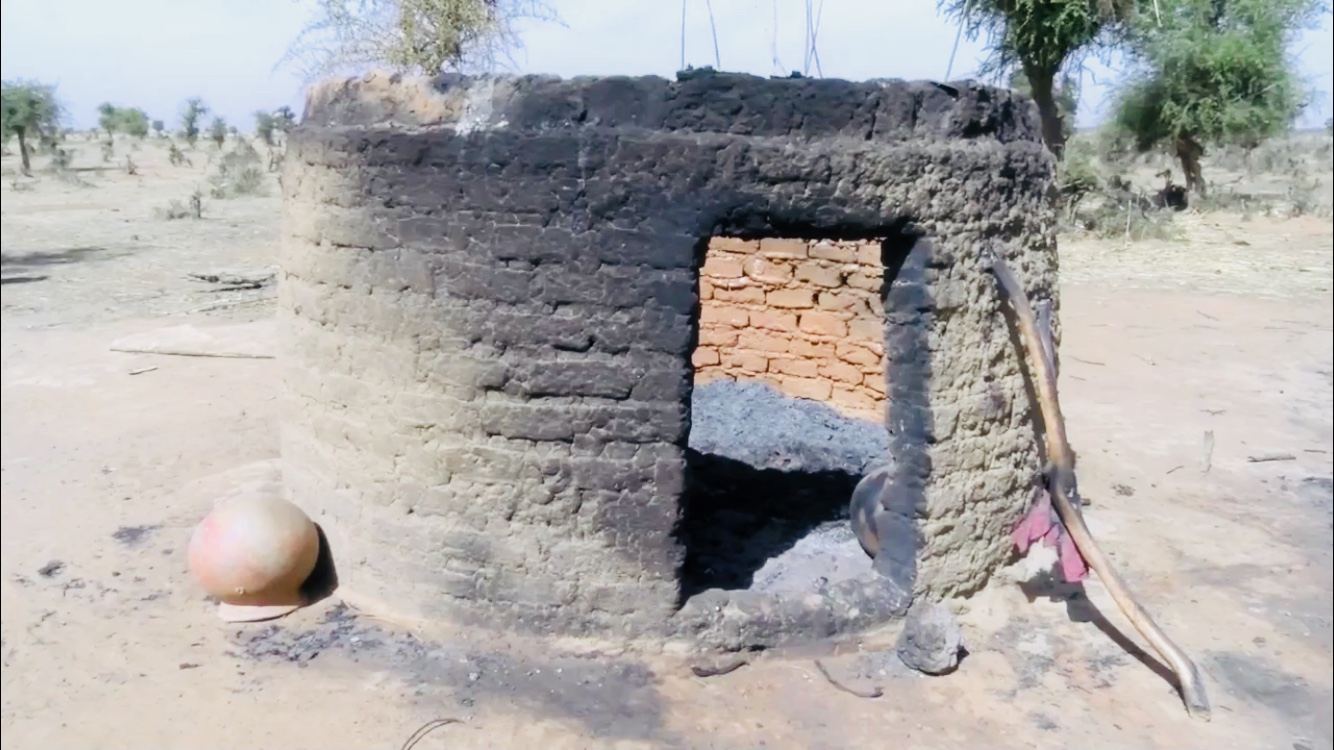
Aftermath of the Anti-Fulani pogrom in Yirgou.

On 1 January 2019, militants murdered twenty people in the village of Yirgou, Barsalogho department. The villagers, mostly ethnic Mossis suspicious of the Fulani and their ties to militants, massacred the Fulani members of the town in the Yirgou massacre. 72 people were killed and over 6,000 were displaced by the violence.

On 10 January, a group of 36 jihadist militants killed twelve civilians in Gasseliki. 17 days later, ten more civilians were killed in Sikiré, near Arbinda. On 28 January, four Burkinabé soldiers were killed and five others wounded in Nassoumbou. From 3–4 February, jihadist militants were reported to have massacred 14 civilians in Kaïn, 80 kilometres from Ouahigouya. On 4 February, the army killed 146 jihadists in the departments of Kaïn, Banh and Bomborokuy. Human Rights Watch alleged that the military had carried out several summary executions. The Burkinabé Movement for Human and Peoples' Rights reported that even though no evidence was found of an attack carried out by terrorists in Kain on that date, government forces killed about sixty civilians.

On 15 February, the Centre-Est region was for the first time attacked by militants. Four Burkinabés and a Spanish priest were killed at a customs post in Nohao, close to the border with Togo.

According to Human Rights Watch, between mid-2018 to February 2019, at least 42 people were killed by jihadist militants and 116 mostly Fulani civilians were killed by the Burkinabé military. From 31 March to 2 April, ethnic clashes between Fulani, Kurumbas, and Mossis killed 62 people in Arbinda.

In 2019, Jihadist groups began a persecution of Christians. The campaign began on 28 April 2019, when six people, including a pastor, were killed by militants inside a Protestant church in Silgadji. On 12 May, six more people, including one priest, were killed in a Catholic church in Dablo after it was attacked by Islamists. The next day, a Catholic procession was targeted near Kayon and Singa-Rimaïbé, in Zimtanga department. Four civilians were killed and a statue of the Virgin Mary was destroyed.

On the night of 9–10 May, French forces attacked a jihadist encampment near Gorom-Gorom, freeing four hostages — two French, one South-Korean and one American. Four jihadist militants and two French soldiers died.

On 9 June 19 civilians died in an attack on Arbinda. On 18 June, jihadist militants killed 17–18 people in the village of Béléhédé. On 22 June 15 villagers in Sagho and Toekédogo, Barsalogho department, were killed, and on the night of 25–26 July, 22 other villagers were killed in a massacre in Dibilou, near the city of Kaya.

According to the ACLED, armed violence in Burkina Faso increased by 174% in 2019, with nearly 1,300 civilians dead and 860,000 displaced.

=== 2020 ===
On 4 January 2020, a bus carrying middle school students blew up after it ran over an explosive device between Toéni and Tougan, resulting in fourteen deaths. On 20 January, jihadist militants attacked the villages of Nagraogo and Alamou, in Barsalogho, Sanmatenga, and massacred 36 civilians. The next day, the Parliament of Burkina Faso passed a law permitting the recruitment of civilian militias called Koglweogo to combat the growing insurgency. The idea was initially proposed by president Roch Marc Christian Kaboré in November 2019.

On 25 January, the village of Silgadji was attacked again by militants, killing 39 civilians. Three days later, six Burkinabé soldiers were killed between Madjoari and Pama, in Kompienga province. On 12 February, two civilians were killed by jihadist militants in Tanwalbougou.

On 16 February, a Protestant church in Pansi was attacked by jihadist militants, who killed 24 people (including the pastor) and wounded 20 more. This was a week before five people (also including a pastor) were killed in a church in the neighbouring town of Sebba.

On 29 February, Sebba was attacked again, leaving ten policemen dead.

On 8 March, the Fulani villages of Barga-Peulh and Dinguila-Peulh, Barga department, were raided by pro-government militias, whose members killed 43 civilians.

The Fada N’Gourma shooting occurred on 7 August 2020. At least 20 people were killed when an unidentified gunmen attacked a cattle market in Fada N’Gourma, Gourma Province, Est Region, Burkina Faso.

In October, around fifty refugees tried to return to their home region. Their convoy was ambushed in the middle of the night, ten kilometers from Pissila. 25 male refugees, approximately half of the convoy, were killed by jihadist militants. All women and children were spared.

=== 2021 ===
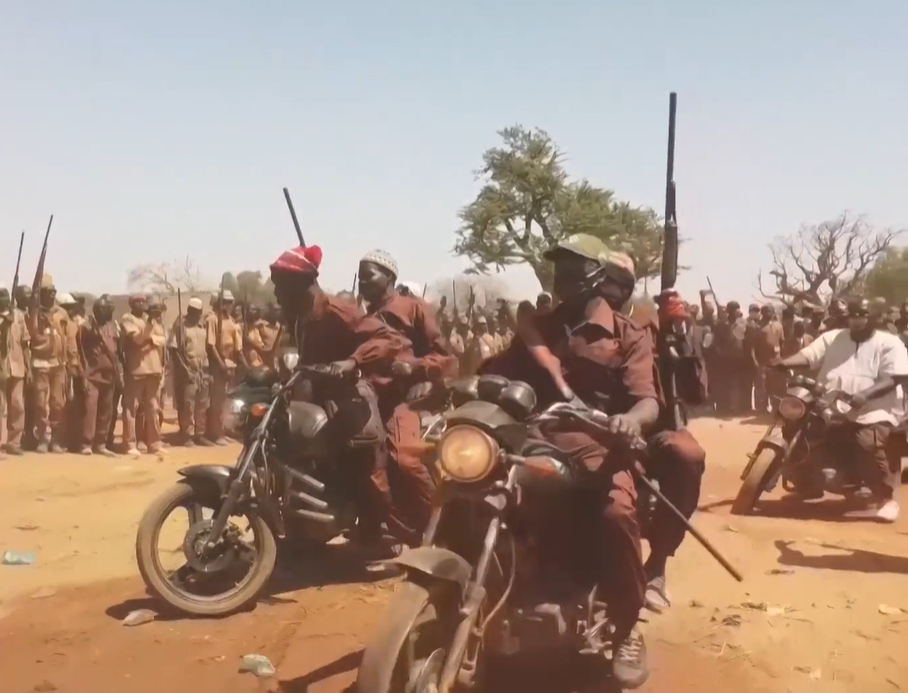
Self-defense forces in Burkina Faso in 2021

From 4–5 June, JNIM militants massacred over 170 people in the villages of Solhan and Tadaryat, the deadliest civilian attack up to that point in the war.

On 20 August, jihadist militants killed 80 people in Gorgadji, including 59 civilians.

November became one of the year's bloodiest months for Burkina Faso. On 14 November, the Jama'at Nasr al-Islam wal Muslimin attacked the gendarmerie in Inata, killing 53 people, including four civilians. The attack, which remains the greatest loss suffered by the Burkinabe military during the insurgency so far, was a major blow to government morale. On 21 November, an attack in Foubé resulted in nine Burkinabé soldiers and ten civilians killed.

In December, a group of civilians stopped a French convoy in Kaya Department, alleging that France was secretly working with the jihadists. In a separate incident during that month, Islamists killed 41 people in an ambush, including the popular vigilante leader Ladji Yoro. Yoro was a central figure in the Volunteers for the Defense of the Homeland, or VDP for short, a pro-government militia that has taken a leading role in the country's struggle against Islamists.

=== 2022 ===
On 15 January, at least 10 civilians were killed in an attack blamed on jihadist militants in northern Burkina Faso, in the village of Namssiguian in Bam province.

Operation Laabingol 1 took place in the north of the country, from 16 to 23 January 2022. 163 jihadists were killed, injured, or captured in the operations, including 60 in collaboration with French forces in the country, according to the French and Burkinabe militaries. The Burkinabe government claimed to have killed the leader of jihadists operating in the Kelbo area. The Burkinabe military claimed to have lost one soldier, and two wounded in the operation, and captured many weapons, including improvised explosive devices.

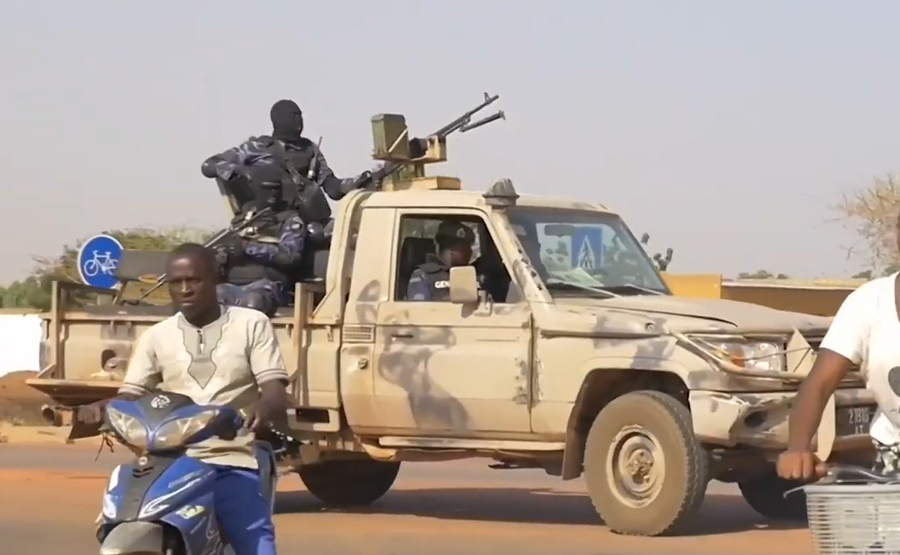
Burkinabé soldiers in the aftermath of the 2022 coup.

On 23 January, military officials overthrew Kabore's ruling government. Government failures to quell the Islamist insurgency were described as the main cause of the coup, which was met with public enthusiasm. The junta's leader, Paul-Henri Sandaogo Damiba, is well known for his widely popular military operations against Islamists. Damiba replaced government ministers (such as Gilbert Noël Ouédraogo) perceived to have handled the insurgency poorly with more popular figures.

Allegations were raised that in the aftermath of the coup the Patriotic Movement for Safeguard and Restoration may hire mercenaries from the Wagner Group in the future. Damiba had called earlier to hire Russian mercenaries against the Islamists, but was forbidden to do so by Kabore.

On 27 January, France confirmed that from 15 to 23 January 2022, more than sixty recorded jihadists had been killed in four separate incidents by Burkinabé soldiers working together with French units.

Ten militants of Ansarul Islam were killed during a battle with French forces on 10 February near Ouahigouya after the killing of five officers in the previous year. Four civilians died in the crossfire. French authorities expressed regret for the civilian casualties, which they claimed were accidental.

On 8–9 February, insurgents attacked the W National Park in Benin, killing nine people. On 12 February, French forces retaliated by launching a major airstrike on an Islamist camp in Burkina Faso, killing forty rebels. On 11 May 2022, militants crossed the border into Togo and killed eight soldiers.

On 9 June, several attacks took place across the country. A civilian and a soldier were killed at the Karma gold mine in Yatenga Province along with 3 to 4 government soldiers injured. In Seytenga Department, Séno Province, 11 military police were killed when their command post came under attack by militants. In Kossi Province, 4 military police were killed in an attack.

Over the weekend of 12–13 June, between 100 and 165 people were killed in Seytenga Department, Séno Province. The attackers appear to have targeted men, and around 3,000 people fled their homes after the attack. The UNHCR reported on 17 June that around 16,000 people had fled the area since the attack and called for urgent support for the IDPs. On 12 June, at least six people were killed in Alga, Bam Province.

On 15 June 7 members of the Volunteers for the Defense of the Homeland were reported to have been killed by militants in Bouroum, Namentenga Province.

On 18 June, the ECOWAS mediator to Burkina Faso, Mahamadou Issoufou, stated that the Government of Burkina Faso controls 60% the country.

On 22 June, the Government announced the creation of "military zones". Populations in these designated areas have to leave their homes and lands in order to allow the country's Armed and Security Forces to fight the armed insurgents without any "hindrances".

On 25 June, the Army of Burkina Faso presented a 2-week deadline for populations in the so-called "military zones" to abandon their homes and move to safer zones.

On the night 3–4 July, fourteen churchgoers were killed by militants at the Cathedral of Nouna.

On 8 August, five civilians and five armed volunteers were killed by unidentified assailants.

On 9 August, fifteen Burkinabé soldiers were killed in a double-tap bomb attack.

On 14 August, the Collective against Impunity and the Stigmatization of Communities (CISC), a Burkinabe NGO, denounced the massacre of at least 40 civilians allegedly perpetrated by Burkinabe soldiers on 8 August. The massacre is said to have occurred in Tougouri Department.

On 5 September, at least 35 civilians were killed and 37 wounded following a suspected jihadist attack when a vehicle in an escorted supply convoy, heading to Ouagadougou, was struck by an improvised explosive device (IED) on the main road, between the northern towns of Djibo and Bourzanga, in the north of Burkina Faso.

On 26 September, eleven soldiers were killed and 50 civilians were missing following a suspected jihadist attack in the northern town of Djibo in the Gaskinde area of Soum Province of Burkina Faso. The attack also left 28 wounded, including 20 soldiers, 1 Volunteer for the Defense of the Homeland (VDP) and 7 civilians.

On 30 September, a second military coup within a year occurred, with the military removing Lt Col Paul-Henri Damiba, citing his "inability to deal with an Islamist insurgency". The new leader Col Ibrahim Traoré, who led an anti-jihadist unit in the north of Burkina Faso called Cobra, claimed Damiba was being protected by the French army, which resulted in violent protests by citizens outside the French embassy. Traoré expects Damiba of plotting a counter-attack, which will push the country into civil war. Gunshots were heard in Burkina Faso's capital city Ouagadougou and helicopters had circled overhead.

On 2 October, religious and community leaders announced that Damiba had agreed to resign from his position after they mediated between him and Traoré. Damiba reportedly demanded seven guarantees in return, including that his allies would be protected, a guarantee for his security and rights, and that the new junta would fulfill the promise he made to the Economic Community of West African States (ECOWAS) about restoring civilian rule in two years.

On 9 November 2022 the 14th Inter-Arms Regiment of Djibo fired artillery into the village of Holdé, Yaté, Ména, and Dabere-Pogowel. The Shells were fired from a military outpost 10 km from the villages. Many civilians were killed including women and a seven-month-old baby, the civilians mainly belonged to the Fulani ethnic minority which has long been suspected of supporting Jihadists. In total at least 50 civilians were killed in the massacre.

On 30–31 December, at least 28 Fula men were massacred in the town of Nouna, in an attack blamed on the Volunteers for the Defense of the Homeland (VDP).

=== 2023 ===
44 civilians were killed by jihadists from 6–7 April in Kourakou and Tondobi, Séno Province.

Insurgents attacked a military detachment and VDP force in Aoréma, Ouahigouya Department on 15 April. Authorities reported that 6 soldiers and 34 VDP militias had been killed, but other sources suggested that the death toll could be as high as 75.

On 20 April, possibly in response to the attack in Aoréma, the Rapid Intervention Brigade committed the Karma massacre, one of the deadliest crimes committed during the conflict. Witnesses described how residents had cheered on the advance of hundreds of soldiers into Karma, a Mossi-majority village with a population of around 400 people. Despite the fact the village was pro-Traoré, soldiers rounded up civilians en masse and had shot them. Soldiers killed civilians in their own homes and burned houses to the ground while the residents were still inside. Women, children, elderly people and babies were said to be among the dead. While officials said that at least sixty people had been killed, witnesses claimed the number of dead was around 200.

On 5 September, dozens were killed in clashes in Yatenga Province.

On 5 November, a massacre was carried out in the village of Zaongo by an unknown group. It was reported that at least 70 people were killed, mostly children and elderly. The European Union's foreign policy chief Josep Borrell issued a condemnation and said that the death toll was over 100.

On 18 November, near-simultaneous attacks took place in Diapaga, killing 15 people.

On 26 November, allegedly about 3,000 jihadists affiliated with JNIM launched a major assault on Djibo, resulting in at least 40 civilian deaths. 400 jihadists allegedly died (per-Burkina Faso) in a counter-offensive, along with several Burkinabe soldiers.

=== 2024 ===
On 25 January, it was reported that Russia had sent around 100 troops, with 200 more expected to arrive, to help train the Burkina Faso Army and patrol dangerous areas. In a state visit in June, Russian Foreign Minister Sergei Lavrov stated that the number of military instructors would increase in the future.

On 25 February at least 15 people were killed by the Islamic State in an attack on a Catholic church in the village of Essakane in Oudalan Province. Dozens of civilians were killed during an attack on a mosque in Natiaboani. Members of the auxiliary VDP were also targeted. Burkina Faso's army summarily executed 223 civilians. Massacres occurred in Nondin and Soro villages.

On 3 March, a recent attack on three villages led to the killing of 170 people by the militants.

On 31 March, JNIM attacked Burkinabe forces in Tawori, Tapoa Province. At least 41 Burkinabe soldiers and 32 civilians were killed during the attack and the subsequent massacre.

On 11 June, JNIM attacked a military base and captured it killing 107 soldiers and taking another seven prisoner.

Reports found August to be a particularly deadly months. JNIM killed over 950 people which was a 117% increase in fatalities from July according to ACLED. On 25 August, JNIM again launched a major attack on people digging trenches for the fortification of security outposts in the region of Barsalogho. At least 600 people were killed and 300 people were injured in the attack.

=== 2025 ===
On 10 February, the Burkinabe army announced it had "neutralised" at least 73 suspected terrorists in the Sourou province, in the west of the country.

On 28 March, JNIM attacked Burkinabe forces at Diapaga, Est Region, killing at least 60 soldiers. The attack was revenge for the massacre of over 58 civilians at Solenzo on 11 March.

On 11 May, JNIM militants attacked several places including hospitals, military bases and civilian infrastructure as well as police station and market in the town of Djibo. The army failed to repel the attack and as a result between 100 and 200 civilians and soldiers were killed.

On 12 May, JNIM launched another attack on Diapaga. This time, they took control of the town for several hours, destroying buildings and monuments, and releasing inmates from the local prison, which was holding suspected insurgents.

On 27 May, The Burkianabe Armed Forces recaptured the town of Gassam in the Boucle du Mouhoun Region. Reportedly, around 87 militants were killed in the offensive.

On 1 June, JNIM took over a military base in Koumbri, Yatenga Province, killing 45 Burkinabe soldiers and 10 VDP militiamen.

On 9 June, the 27th BIR of the Burkinabe Army reentered Diapaga according to a broadcast from Radio Télévision du Burkina, having left from Fada N'gourma two weeks prior.

On 16 June, JNIM destroyed a telcommunications tower in Koaré, 15 km from Fada N'gourma.

On 11 July, JNIM militants ambushed a VDP patrol in Ouarkoye, near Dédougou, killing 16 and destroying 21 motorcycles.

On 28 July 100 JNIM militants launched an attack on a base in Dargo, killing around 40-50 soldiers. The militants also looted and set fire to the base. A convoy travelling between Gorom-Gorom and Dori was also attacked by ISGS militants, killing at least 30.

On 9 August, the BIR-7 Battalion launched a coordinated attack on JNIM militants near Kantchari, who were preparing for an assault on the town. About a hundred militants were killed during the attack and a large stockpile of weapons was abandoned.

On 16 September, Islamic State - Sahel Province militants ambushed JNIM positions near Sebba.

On 17 September, JNIM militants captured three military positions in Djibo, killing 8 soldiers and seizing equipment.

On 8 October, JNIM ambushed a Burkinabe military convoy near the town of Noogo, killing an estimated 50 soldiers.

=== 2026 ===
On 8 January, JNIM militants took control of the town of Lankoure, Sourou Province, claiming to have killed 17 soldiers.

On 14 January, Burkinabe Forces launched an assault in the Koulpélogo Province, killing 57 JNIM militants, including Karim Torodo, a high ranking emir, who had a 175 million CFA bounty on him.

On 17-18 January, hundreds of JNIM militants attacked a police detachment in Balga, Gourma Province, Est Region, killing 11.

On 1 February, Burkinabe state media reported that the villages of Youlou, Oualou and Oualoubié had been recaptured by the Burkinabe Army.

On 12 February, JNIM militants temporarily occupied the town of Bilanga, Gnagna Province.

On 16 February, JNIM militants attacked the town of Titao, killing 10 soldiers and partially destroying a military base. Additionally, at least seven Ghanaian tomato traders who were travelling through the town were shot dead by militants.

On 17 March, JNIM militants attacked the village of Dourtenga, killing 9 VDP militiamen and 3 civilians.

On 22 April, JNIM attacked a military base in Bagmoussa, Koulpelogo, killing 28 soldiers and VDP militiamen. Several others were reported missing, and shops in the town were looted.

On 30 June, a large scale JNIM assault was repelled by the 20th Rapid Intervention Battalion in Gayeri.

On 2 July, the Burkinabe government claimed to have killed over 400 jihadist militants in a complex counteroffensive across the country, involving air and ground attacks.

On July 4, the JNIM carried out a raid on the military camp at Di, where at least 23 soldiers and 11 militiamen were killed. The towns of Dalan and Tiéré in Oudalan Province were attacked the same day and at least 18 soldiers were killed there.

On 12 July, JNIM attacked a VDP militia outpost in the Dedougou Area, claiming to have captured it.

On 13 July, JNIM attacked a VDP militia outpost in the Ouahigouya Area, claiming to have captured it.

On 17 August, a commander of the Islamic Sahel province, known as "Abu Zeid al-Burkinabe", was killed during the JNIM operations in northeastern Burkina Faso in the region of Séno.

On September 2, 2026, violent clashes erupted between the JNIM and the Islamic State in the Greater Sahara in the Kacham and Ndaki region on the border between Burkina Faso and Mali. ISGS claimed to have killed 200 JNIM fighters and captured and executed 30 others, but independent researches are not able to refute or confirm the number of losses. According to Héni Nsaibia, senior analyst for West Africa at the NGO Armed Conflict Location & Event Data Project (ACLED) «If this toll is accurate, it would be their deadliest battle since 2019». JNIM maintains that ISGS's death toll is exaggerated, but the group admitted defeat.

On 17 September, JNIM militants took control of a Burkinabe militia (VDP) Post Near Bobodioulasso, Houet Province.

On 18 September, JNIM took control of a military post (Army/VDP Militias) in Aoréma, Yatenga Province.

On 22 September, JNIM took control of a Burkinabe Army post in Pensa, Kaya area, Sandbondtenga Province.

Clashes between JNIM and ISGS have been taking place since the beginning of October. ISGS claimed that on October 9, they repelled an JNIM offensive near to village Ganavadzi in Oudalan Province, and on 12 October, killed approximately 400 of the JNIM militants. According to a Mauritanian newspaper, at least 60 people were killed on both sides.

== Humanitarian situation ==
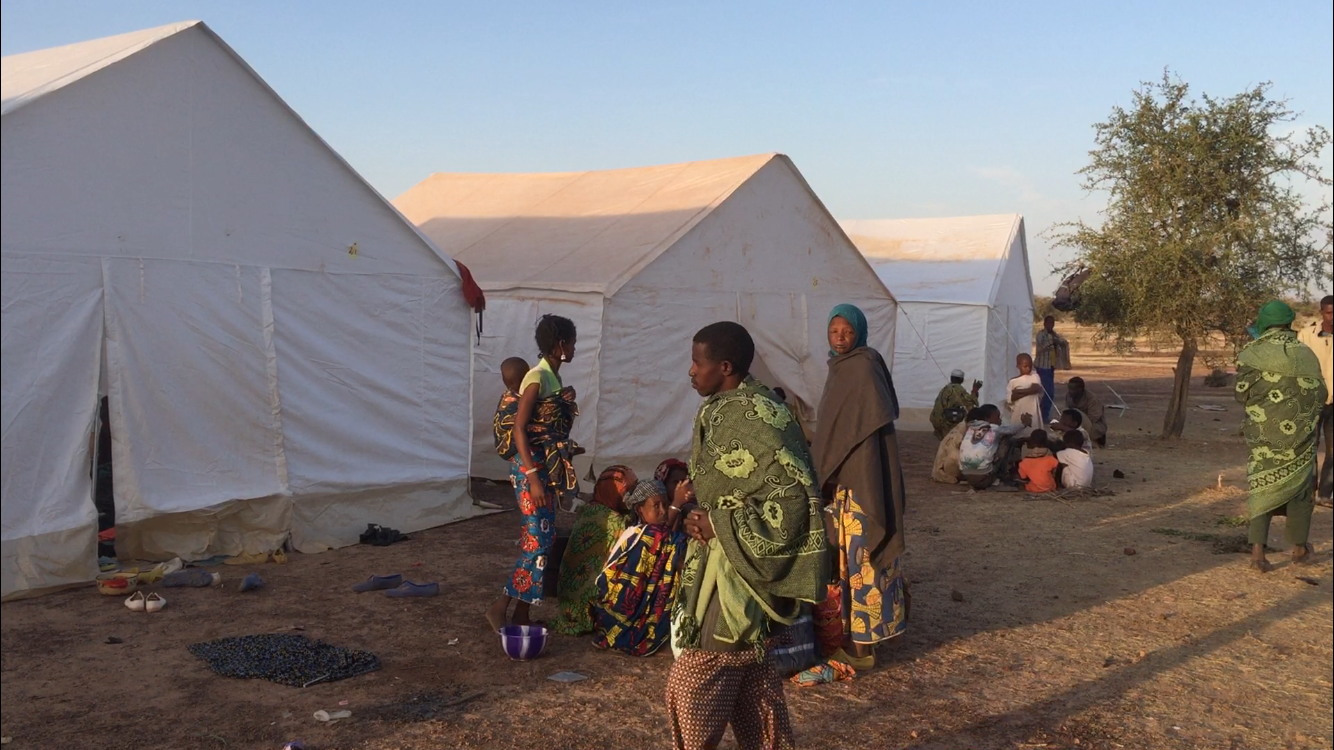
Displaced Fulani civilians in the aftermath of the Yirgou massacre.

A humanitarian crisis has erupted in the aftermath of the conflict, with thousands of people killed by both sides. The UNHCR estimates that six in ten displaced people in the Sahel are from Burkina Faso.

Government forces have summarily executed a very large number of civilians, disproportionately targeting ethnic Fulani. In October 2019, 14 men had their turbans ripped off by government forces, then forced into a truck and executed. Fulanis have also been subject to violence by pro-government civilians, such as during the 2019 Yirgou massacre, in which hundreds of civilians were murdered by ethnic Mossis.

In 2020, a mass grave containing the bodies of over 180 civilians was discovered near Djibo, killed by government forces. Summary executions and war crimes committed by the military have become a disturbingly routine occurrence in the town. In one separate incident, 10 civilians were killed in a market place in Petagoli, three of them Dogon foreigners from Mali.

Jihadists have also been guilty of human rights abuses. Islamists have also targeted schools, the most famous example happening on 12 November 2018, when six Islamists broke into a primary school, mugged the principal, and attacked several students. This was one of the few local cases in which the people responsible for such an attack were arrested. Rebels have justified attacks on schools by painting them as French and Western-style indoctrination programs. Numerous schools have been shut down, leading to an estimated 300,000 children without access to education. Villagers have been terrorized during their everyday lives, often prohibited from holding baptisms or marriages; the assassination of local elders has become a common occurrence. From April 2019 to January 2020, Human Rights Watch recorded the killing of at least 256 civilians in a series of 20 different attacks. Between February and September 2024, JNIM had killed at least 128 civilians in attacks across the country. These attacks targeted villagers, displaced peoples, and non-Muslims. An ACLED report however said that JNIM's killings reached 1,004 civilians in 259 attacks between January and August.

From May 2025 onwards, JNIM and IS-GS were responsible for the killings of dozens of civilians in Burkina Faso, such as an attack on the town of Djibo on 11 May, and the village of Youba on 3 August, altogether killing at least 40 civilians. Witnesses to the massacres reported that JNIM was targeting ethnic Fulanis, and that local notable families like the Tambouras defected from JNIM to the government's side.

== See also ==
- Jihadist insurgency in Niger
