= Terrorism in Burkina Faso =

Regions of Burkina Faso with significant terrorism.

Terrorism in Burkina Faso refers to non-state actor violence in Burkina Faso carried out with the intent of causing fear and spreading extremist ideology. As of 2026, Burkina Faso faces significant danger from terrorist groups, mainly from Islamic extremist groups such as Jama'at Nusrat al-Islam wal-Muslimin (JNIM) and the Islamic State, and is widely regarded as one of the countries most impacted by terrorism.

Counter-terrorism efforts by Burkina Faso include domestic and regional security efforts, and preventing terrorism-related economic transactions. Citing the government's failures to stop Islamic extremists, however, elements of the Burkina Faso Armed Forces led a September 2022 coup d'etat that unseated interim president Paul-Henri Sandaogo Damiba, replacing a military government that seized power that January for the same reasons. Under interim president Ibrahim Traoré, who led the September coup and heads the nation's military junta, the Patriotic Movement for Safeguard and Restoration, Burkina Faso has ended French assistance against terrorism in favor of aid from Russia, China, Turkey and was a founding member of the Alliance of Sahel States. In a similar time frame in the context of the larger War in the Sahel several groups, most notably JNIM, rapidly expanded operations and non-state forces controlled over half the country.

== Background ==
=== Independence to 2015 ===
Prior to 2015, there were no recorded terrorist incidents in Burkina Faso. However, the country experienced seven coups during this time period, the most of any African country. Additionally, there were some reports that terrorist financing and fund-raising were taking place domestically.

Some argue that then-President Blaise Compaoré, who was in power from 1987 to 2014, partnered with terrorist organizations. While most research suggests that partnerships between Compoaré and terrorist organizations did exist, the exact nature of these agreements remains unverified. In particular, some reports show that Compaoré brokered an agreement with Tuareg rebel groups in Mali associated with al-Qaeda. In trade for operating in Burkina Faso, the Tuareg groups and associated terrorist organizations allegedly agreed not to carry out attacks within the country.

In addition, Compaoré allowed special forces from France and the U.S. to operate in Burkina Faso, serving as a key partner for counterterrorism efforts in the Sahel. Such partnerships led to descriptions of Burkina Faso as "West Africa's linchpin" by the media. Linchpin states signify "crucial but endangered allies" in "creating a global anti-terror regime."

=== First coup and aftermath (2015-2018) ===
During this time period, attacks in Burkina Faso increased both in number and fatality rate. Such incidents garnered international attention, especially including three major terrorist attacks in Ouagadougou in 2016, 2017, and 2018.

According to Joe Penney, this spike in activity can perhaps be attributed to the current government's discontinuation of Compaoré's practice of negotiating with terrorist organizations. Another more referenced cause is the weakened Burkina Faso security apparatus.

In 2014, popular uprisings removed Compaoré from power. Following his removal, the Burkina Faso Regiment of Presidential Security (French: Régiment de la Sécurité Présidentielle, RSP), who was loyal to Compoaré, carried out a coup in 2015 against the transitional government. Although the coup failed, the RSP was dissolved, weakening the state security apparatus and allowing terrorist organizations to increase their operations domestically. The RSP included about 1,300 soldiers and had received training from the U.S. and France in counterterrorism practices. Following its dissolution, this technical expertise and manpower was no longer available to contribute to security efforts. For comparison, Burkina Faso's entire Armed Forces currently has approximately 11,200 personnel − the RSP thus constituted about 10% of Burkina Faso's army.

More recently, human rights organizations have also accused the security forces of carrying out "atrocities...leaving scores dead and forcing tens of thousands of villagers to flee their homes." Some argue that the human rights abuses conducted by the security forces in the name of counterterrorism undermines their effectiveness at preventing terrorist attacks, because abuses make locals less likely to collaborate with security forces against terrorist organizations.

In response to the increased terrorist threat, in November 2016, Burkina Faso decided to withdraw its soldiers from United Nations peacekeeping in Sudan to refocus military efforts on fighting terrorism domestically and to help reinforce existing security forces.

=== State of emergency (2018-2022) ===
Beginning in December 2018, there was a spike in terrorist activity in Burkina Faso. Over a two-month period, there were eight terror attacks, killing over thirty people altogether (see List of terrorist incidents below).

In response to a terror attack near the border with Mali on December 27, 2018, that killed ten gendarmes, the Burkina Faso government declared a state of emergency in several northern provinces. The state of emergency began on January 1, 2019, and included the following fourteen provinces.

- Boucle du Mouhoun: Kossi, Sourou
- Centre-Est: Koulpélogo
- Est: Gnagna, Gourma, Komandjari, Kompienga, Tapoa
- Hauts-Bassins: Kénédougou
- Nord: Lorum
- Sahel: Oudalan, Séno, Soum, Yagha

As part of the declaration, the government authorized curfews, restrictions on movement, searches of private property, weapons confiscation, and prohibiting pro-terrorism publications. The government ruled that any terrorist crimes would be tried in military, not civilian, courts.

Even with these amended regulations, several terrorist attacks occurred during January 2019. In response, on January 19, former Prime Minister Paul Thieba resigned from office. For months leading up to his resignation, the opposition had called for Thieba to step down due to the failure of the government to stop terrorist attacks. Although Thieba did not provide the reason for his resignation, President Roch Marc Christian Kaboré likely pressured Thieba to resign due to the high-profile terrorism-related kidnapping of foreigners in Burkina Faso in December.

=== Coups d'etat and rise of JNIM (2022-present) ===
In January 2022, the Burkina Faso Armed Forces led by Paul-Henri Sandaogo Damiba launched a coup against president Roch Marc Christian Kaboré. Detaining Kaboré, other government officials and dissolving the government and constitution, the military formed the Patriotic Movement for Safeguard and Restoration. Damiba used terrorism as a justification for the coup. Burkina Faso was suspended from the African Union and ECOWAS following the coup.

Again citing concerns over the government's handling of the worsening terrorism crises, dissidents in the armed forces launched another coup in 2022 led by captain Ibrahim Traoré. Under Traoré, Burkina Faso saw the complete departure of French Forces, and closer relations with Russia, Turkey and China, with Russia becoming a close ally. In addition, Burkina Faso formed a security alliance, the Alliance of Sahel States (AES) with fellow coup belt members Mali and Niger in 2023. The tripoint the countries share of Liptako-Gourma is noted for having been a hotspot of unrest and rebellion in recent decades In 2024, Burkina Faso welcomed fighters from Russia's Africa Corps (formerly the private Wagner Group).

Terrorist and separatist controlled areas across the AES states.

The early 2020's also saw the rise of Jama'at Nusrat al-Islam wal Muslimeen (JNIM) from a coalition al-Qaeda affiliate to one of the largest and deadliest terror groups in the world. In 2022, Burkina Faso experienced over 2,000 JNIM-linked incidents. According to a report from Vision of Humanity, using data from the Institute of Economics and Peace, Burkina Faso accounted for 15% of all terrorism deaths in 2025, second to Pakistan, but still saw the largest decrease in deaths from the previous year. In 2026, JNIM attacks caused the deaths of 755 people in Burkina Faso, the highest of any country they operate in. Attacks include mass assaults on Burkinabe military installations and sieges on civilian locations. JNIM and other militant groups continue to hold significant areas of Burkina Faso, along with Mali and Niger. In addition to JNIM attacks, Burkinabe armed forces, militias, and the Russian Africa Corps have been accused of committing atrocities against civilians.

During the same time, the Islamic State Sahel Province (ISSP) also seized land and is responsible for many attacks. In 2019, a war broke out between JNIM and ISSP that has seen fighting occur across the Sahel. ISSP has been reported to be more concerned with controlling territory than JNIM, but JNIM has been able to prevent ISSP's further expansion.

== Terrorist organizations ==
Several different terrorist organizations have claimed responsibility for attacks in Burkina Faso. Most attacks are carried out by foreign-based organizations, affiliated with Al-Qaeda, usually from neighboring Mali. Such organizations tend to focus on religious extremism and anti-Western sentiment. However, some organizations also target Burkina Faso because of communal frustration over the lack of economic development. In particular, terrorist organizations are able to recruit people in Burkina Faso, due to disillusionment about the stagnating economy.

=== Al-Qaeda in the Islamic Maghreb and its affiliates ===
Prior to 2017, most attacks were carried out by al-Qaeda in the Islamic Maghreb (AQIM). AQIM is the North African branch of al-Qaeda (AQ), based in Mali. AQIM has conducted attacks all over the Sahel. For example, AQIM and its affiliate, al-Mourabitoun, claimed responsibility for the 2016 Ouagadougou attacks. These two organizations had merged one month earlier in December 2015, although they previously had a contentious relationship. Following the merger, many expected the danger posed by AQIM to the region to increase.

Other AQ affiliates that have participated in terrorist activity in Burkina Faso include: Ansar-ul-Islam lil-Ichad wal Jihad (IRSAD), which is led by a radicalized Burkina Faso preacher, Islamic State in the Greater Sahara (ISGS), a breakaway group from al-Mourabitoun that pledged allegiance to the Islamic State in Iraq and the Levant (ISIL/IS), Macina Liberation Front, a Mali organization that has worked with AQIM, and the Movement for Unity and Jihad in West Africa (MUJAO), a breakaway group from AQIM.

=== Jama'at Nusrat al-Islam wal Muslimeen ===
In March 2017, Jama'at Nusrat al-Islam wal Muslimeen (JNIM) formed from the merger of AQIM, Ansar al-Dine, and al-Mourabitoun. Since's its formation, it has developed into one of the largest terror organizations in the world. A 2025 estimate put them at nearly 6,000 fighters, led by Iyad ag Ghali and Amadou Koufa. JNIM is noted for their high centralization at the top of the organization and cooperation with al-Qaeda, while also being adaptable at the lower levels and adapting their recruiting to fit local needs. The group also targets roads and supply chains to further disrupt government and mercenary forces fighting them, and has conducted sieges on towns and cities in Burkina Faso and Mali. JNIM, in addition to holding territory in Burkina Faso, Niger and Mali has also committed attacks in Togo, Benin, Ivory Coast and Nigeria.

=== Islamic State and its affiliates ===
The Islamic State also has a significant presence in the region, led by their affiliate Islamic State - Sahel Province (ISSP). Originally known as the Islamic State in the Greater Sahara, it was led by Adnan Abu Walid al-Sahraoui until his death in a French drone strike in 2021. Following a reorganization in 2022, it was declared a province as the group seized territory and attempted to form a proto-state.

== List of major terrorist incidents ==
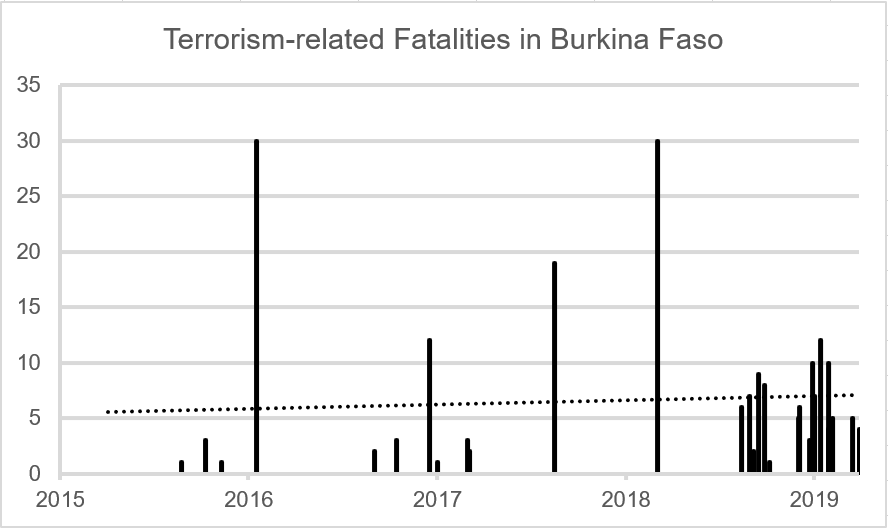
Graph of terrorism-related fatalities. The dotted trend line shows the gradual increase of the fatality rate.

Terrorist incidents are currently concentrated in the Sahel and Est regions because these regions are particularly close to instability in Mali and Niger. The most fatal attacks include the 2016, 2017, and 2018 terror attacks in Ouagadougou. As shown in the table below, there has been a further spike in terrorism activity in 2019.

Date	Incident	Perpetrator	Location (Region − city)	Fatalities	Injuries
April 4, 2015	Kidnapping of Romanian mineworker	Al-Mourabitoun	Oudalan − Tambao mining site	0	1 (kidnapped)
August 23, 2015	Samorogouan attack, Police post attack	Unidentified*	Sahel − Oursi	1	1
October 9, 2015	Police station attack	Mali separatists	Hauts-Bassins − Samorogouan	3	2
November 8, 2015	Gold convoy attack	Unidentified*	Sahel − Djibo	1−3	NA
January 15, 2016	2016 Ouagadougou attacks	Ansar al-Dine / Al-Qaeda in the Islamic Maghreb	Centre − Ouagadougou	30	71
January 15, 2016	Kidnapping of Australian medical workers	Al-Qaeda in the Islamic Maghreb	Sahel − Djibo	0	2 (kidnapped)
September 1, 2016	Customs post attack	Islamic State in the Greater Sahara	Sahel − Markoye	2	3
October 12, 2016	Intangom attack, Army checkpoint attack	Islamic State in the Greater Sahara	Sahel − Intangom	3−5	3
December 16, 2016	2016 Nassoumbou attack	Ansar-ul-Islam lil-Ichad wal Jihad	Sahel − Nassoumbou	12	~2
December 31, 2016	Targeted reprisal attacks	Ansar-ul-Islam lil-Ichad wal Jihad	Sahel − Djibo, Sibé	1	1
February 27, 2017	Police stations attacks	Ansar-ul-Islam lil-Ichad wal Jihad	Sahel − Soum	3	NA
March 3, 2017	School attack	Unidentified*	Sahel − Kourfayl	2	0
August 14, 2017	2017 Ouagadougou attack	Unidentified* (al-Qaeda in the Islamic Maghreb is suspected)	Centre − Ouagadougou	19	21−25
March 2, 2018	2018 Ouagadougou attacks	Jamaat Nusrat al-Islam wal Muslimeen (JNIM)**	Centre − Ouagadougou	30	85
August 13, 2018	Mining convoy attack	Unidentified* (roadside bomb and attack)	Est − Fada N'Gourma	6	NA
August 28, 2018	Security forces convoy attack	Unidentified* (roadside bomb)	Est − Pama	7	6
September 5, 2018	Military convoy attack	Unidentified* (roadside bomb)	Est − Kabonga	2	6
September 15, 2018	Targeted attacks	Unidentified*	Est − Diabiga and Kompienga	9	NA
September 26, 2018	Military convoy attack	Unidentified* (roadside bomb)	Sahel − Baraboule	8	NA
October 6, 2018	Military convoy attack	Unidentified* (roadside bomb)	Est − Pama	1	1
November 30, 2018	Police convoy attack	Unidentified* (roadside bomb)	Est − Boungou	5	NA
December 3, 2018	Military convoy attack	Unidentified*	Est − Bougui	6	1
December 22, 2018	Military convoy attack	Unidentified*	Est − Kompienga	3	4
December 27, 2018	Police convoy attack	Jamaat Nusrat al-Islam wal Muslimeen (JNIM)**	Boucle du Mouhoun − Loroni	10	3
January 1, 2019	Village attack	Unidentified* (Jihadist attack triggering ethnic massacre)	Centre-Nord − Yirgou	7	0
January 12, 2019	Village attack	Unidentified*	Sahel − Gasseliki	12	2
January 27, 2019	Village attacks	Unidentified*	Sahel − Sikire	10	NA
January 28, 2019	Military base attack	Jamaat Nusrat al-Islam wal Muslimeen**	Sahel − Nassoumbou	4	NA
January 30, 2019	Military facility attack	Jamaat Nusrat al-Islam wal Muslimeen**	Est − Kompienbiga	0	1
February 5, 2019	Military reprisal attack	Unidentified*	Sahel − Oursi	5	3
March 2, 2018	2018 Ouagadougou attacks	Jama'at Nasr al-Islam wal Muslimin	Centre – Ouagadougou	8	65
March 16–17, 2019	Military convoy attacks	Unidentified*	Est − Gourma	5	NA
March 28, 2019	Military base attack	Unidentified*	Boucle du Mahoun − Barani	4	NA
May 3, 2021	Kodyel attack	Unidentified*	Est - Kodyel	30	20
June 4–5, 2021	Solhan and Tadaryat massacres	Unidentified*	Sahel - Solhan and Tadaryat	132	NA
July 2, 2022	Village attack	Unidentified*	Nord − Namissiguima	12	NA
July 3, 2022	Village attack	Unidentified*	Boucle du Mouhoun − Bourasso	22	NA
August 9, 2022	2022 Namsiguia bombing	JNIM or ISGS	Centre-Nord – Namssiguia	15	1+
September 5, 2022	Silgadji bus bombing	Unknown jihadists	Sahel – Outside the town of Silgadji	35	37
April 6–7, 2023	Village attack	Unidentified	Séno Province-Kourakou and Tondobi	44	N/A
September 4, 2023	Battle of Koumbri	Jama'at Nasr al-Islam wal Muslimin	Nord – Yatenga Province, Koumbri	53	30

* Most "unidentified" terror attacks are likely carried out by Ansar al-Islam or Jamaat Nusrat al-Islam wal Muslimeen.

** Jamaat Nusrat al-Islam wal Muslimeen (JNIM) formed in March 2017 from the merger of al-Qaeda in the Islamic Maghreb, Ansar al-Dine, and al-Mourabitoun.

== Counterterrorism efforts ==
=== Domestic efforts ===
Burkina Faso's former President Roch Marc Christian Kaboré has described counterterrorism as a "national priority." Efforts to fight terrorism include placing more security forces throughout Burkina Faso, creating specialized task forces, and organizing raids targeting terrorists.

Regarding increasing security forces in Burkina Faso, President Kaboré planned to remove soldiers deployed as peacekeepers in Darfur, Sudan by July 2017 to refocus manpower on domestic terrorism issues. The government also requested in 2016 that Burkina Faso soldiers that were part of the United Nations (UN) peacekeeping mission in Mali be deployed to areas close to its own border. Nonetheless, media reports in 2019 showed that Burkina Faso forces outside the country were often better trained than domestic units.

The government also created specialized military units dedicated to fighting terrorism. In January 2013, the Groupement des Forces Anti-Terroristes (GFAT) was created as a joint Army-Gendarmerie-Police counterterrorism task force. GFAT has since grown from 500 troops to 1,600 troops that specialize in targeting terrorism activity.

Starting in 2018, the military also began conducted more raids against terrorist networks in northern areas of Burkina Faso, but such raids were often correlated with alleged human rights abuses. For example, on February 4, 2019, the Army claimed to have fought and killed 146 terrorists near the border with Mali, but human rights groups suggested that there was no evidence that the people targeted were terrorists and described the incident as a "summary execution."

On 9 April 2020, security forces of Burkina Faso executed 31 unarmed men on the day of their arrest by the security forces. They were killed within a few hours of their arrest.

Government handling of terrorist organizations have become a central issue in Burkina Faso, with both 2022 coups citing it as the reason for their seizure of power. Following the consolidation of power under military ruler and interim president Ibrahim Traoré and the introduction of Russia's Africa Corps, allegations of humans rights abuses against the government and their allies have grown. Traoré has focused on economic advancement and security of the regime, but his claims that the state security forces have been pushing back the terror groups are doubted by analysts.

=== International efforts ===
Burkina Faso partners with other countries in the region to improve security efforts. The country was part of the G5 Sahel, a cooperative alliance between Burkina Faso, Chad, Mali, Mauritania, and Niger. Operating a joint force, the group attempted to focus on counterterrorism. However, after several members including Burkina Faso departed following a series of coups, the alliance was dissolved in 2023.

In 2023 Burkina Faso, Mali and Niger formed the Alliance of Sahel States, a defense pact that commits the countries, all led by military governments, to collaborate on counterterrorism initiatives. Traoré also distanced the country from the West, removing all French troops. Instead, the Burkinabe government pursued closer relations with Russia, eventually receiving a force from the Russian Africa Corps.

== Impacts of terrorism ==
Terrorism has had several significant impacts on Burkina Faso, including the displacement of people, limiting access to public services, and declining safety ratings.

=== Displacement ===
According to a March 2019 United Nations High Commissioner for Refugees (UNHCR) report, increasing violence has led to the displacement of 115,310 Internally Displaced Persons (IDPs) in Burkina Faso. Regions most affected included the Sahel, Centre-Nord, Nord, and Est regions, which are also where terrorism attacks are the highest.

In January 2019, the Burkina Faso government created two IDP-hosting sites and a response strategy to the displacement crisis. Currently, 90% of IDPs live in host communities, many of whom live in the Mentao refugee camp near Djibo, Sahel. IDPs face several issues including malaria, cholera, and respiratory disease outbreaks, sexual violence, and cultural clashes.

=== Access to public services ===
Terrorism has harmed access to education and health facilities in several areas of the country. According to a report by the BBC, since December 2018, 1,111 out of 2,869 schools in the Nord, Sahel, and Est regions of Burkina Faso have closed. Due to terrorist activity, 150,000 children were effected, only 57.9% of children in 2016 completed elementary school, and 352 schools were closed in the Soum province, the highest rate in the country.

Meanwhile, access to health services in Burkina Faso has also declined. Prior to 2015, the health system was able to overcome external pressure and maintain secure access to health services. However, the increase in terrorism has made it harder for the system to address citizen needs. A study found that while health services had "appropriate management" in response to terrorist attacks, it still faced several issues, including coordinating resource allocation in crises. In addition, security measures by the government have caused some health workers to be unwilling to work in dangerous areas, undermining access to health services in regions affected by terrorism. Meanwhile, IDPs also face poor health access. For example, the local health center at the Mentao refugee camp (which houses 30% of all IDPs) provides free health services but is constantly overwhelmed with patients.

=== Safety ratings ===
The U.S. State Department lists Burkina Faso as a Level 4 - Do Not Travel due to reasons including terrorism. U.S. government employees are not permitted to leave the capital and notes the threat of kidnapping of Westerners. The UK Foreign and Commonwealth Office advises against all travel to Burkina Faso The Canadian Government also issued a warning to "Avoid all travel" due to the threat of terrorism and regional instability.

== See also ==
- List of massacres in Burkina Faso
