= War in the Sahel =

War in West Africa

- Part of the war on terror, spillover of the Insurgency in the Maghreb (2002–present) and the War against the Islamic State
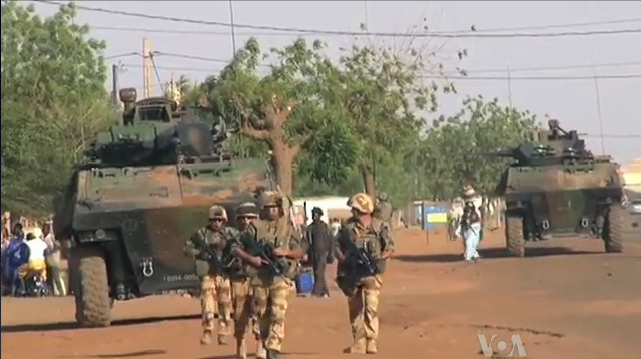
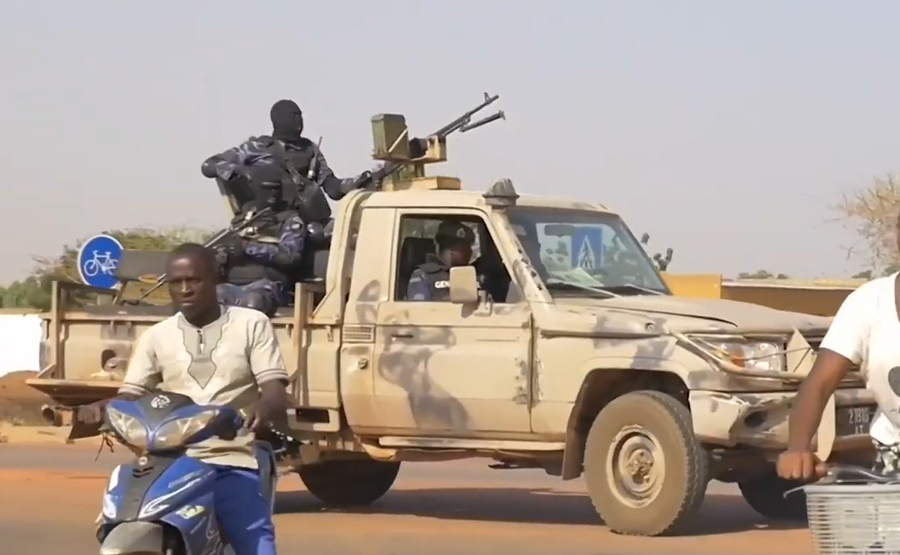
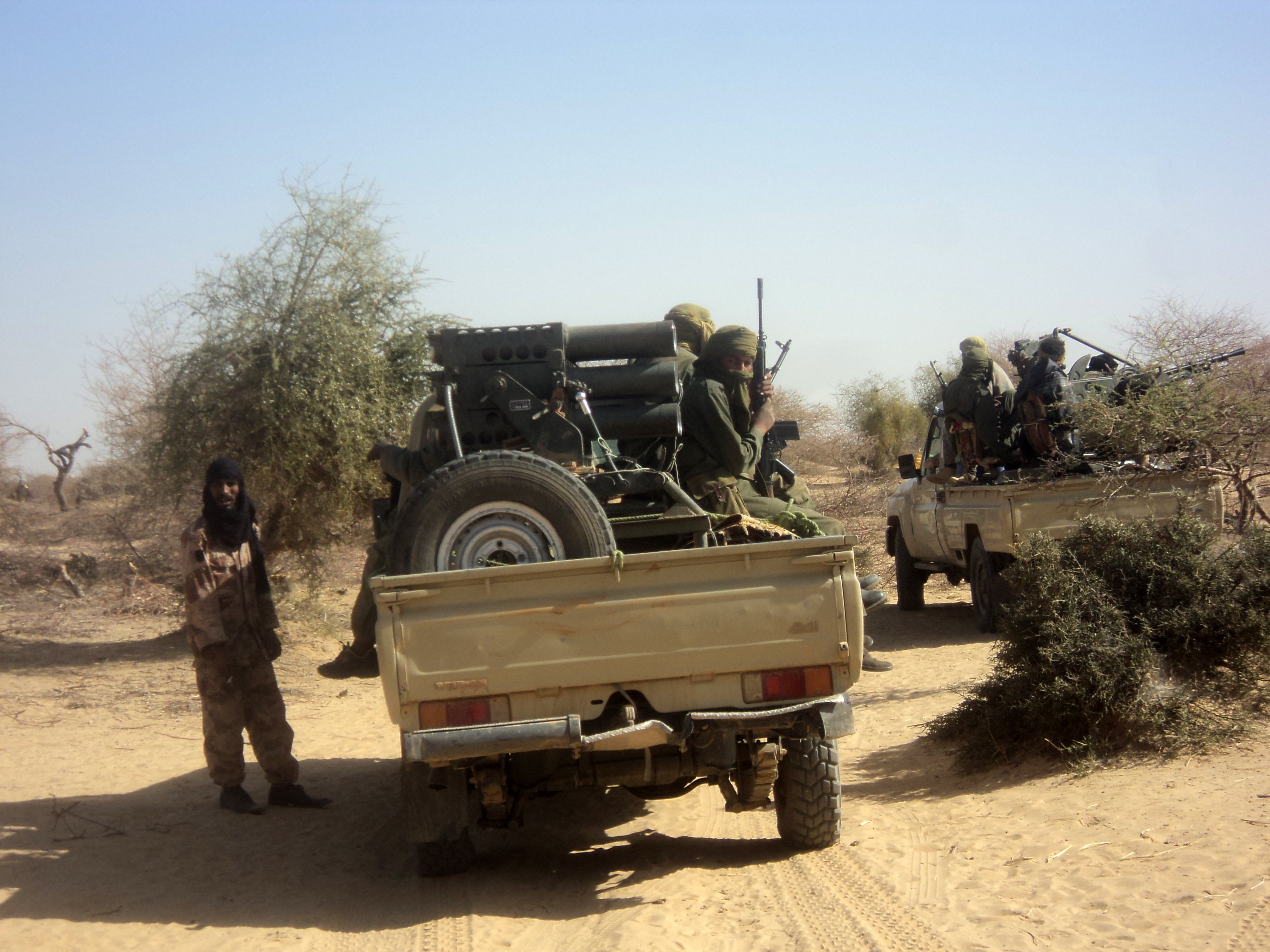
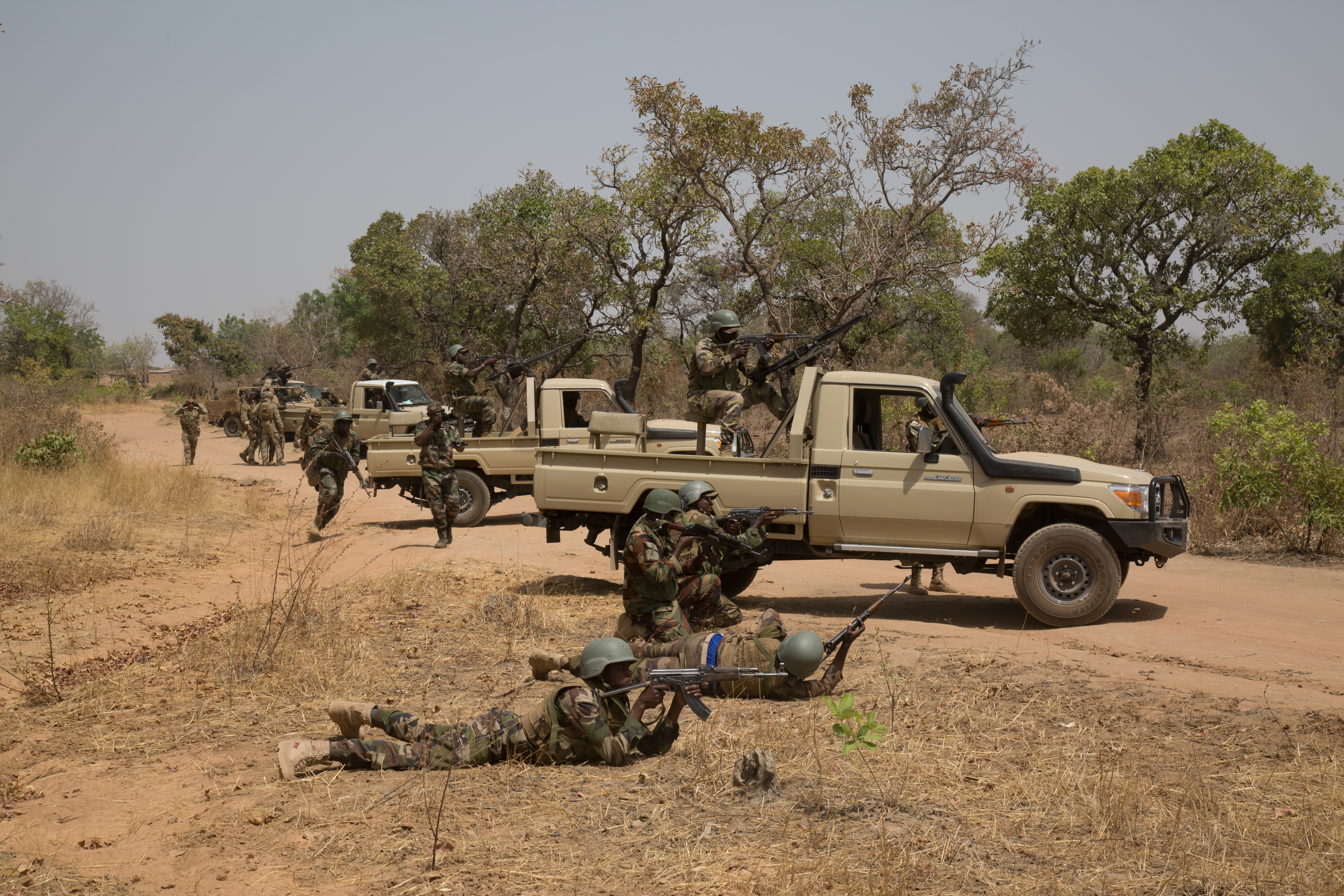
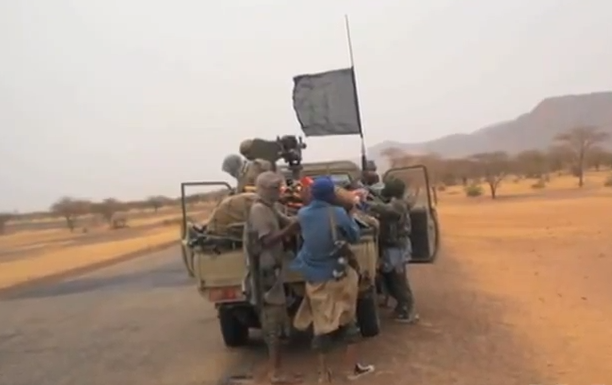
- From top to bottom, left to right: French soldiers in Gao, c. March–April 2013; Burkinabé soldiers in the aftermath of the January 2022 coup; Touareg militants, seen driving near Timbuktu, May 2012; Nigerien soldiers respond to an ambush during training at Exercise Flintlock 2019 near Po, Burkina Faso, February 2019; Islamist fighters in Northern Mali.
Date	16 January 2012 (Note: While conflicts like the AQIM insurgency and Tuareg rebellions were ongoing up until the start of the 2012 Tuareg rebellion, the conflict that would devolve into the war in the Sahel did not start until January 2012.) – present (14 years, 10 months and 2 days)
Location	Sahel (mainly Mali, Burkina Faso and Niger), with spillovers in Benin, Togo, Mauritania, Algeria and Ivory Coast
Status	Ongoing; Mali War: Tuareg rebels and allied Islamists overrun Northern Mali in 2012 until pushed back by a French intervention; Islamist insurgency in Burkina Faso: Mali War spills over into Burkina Faso by 2015; Around 25~60% of the country controlled by jihadist forces; Islamist insurgency in Niger; Boko Haram insurgency arises and extends in Chad, Niger, and Cameroon; French and American intervention on behalf of governments; Al-Qaeda–Islamic State conflict and the JNIM-ISGS war; Jihadist insurgency in Northern Benin; Rise of the Coup Belt; French exit finalized in 2025, Russian intervention on behalf of governments; Creation of the Alliance of Sahel States

Belligerents
United Force of the Alliance of Sahel States (FU‑AES); Mali; Niger; Burkina Faso; Benin; Togo (Note: JNIM has had a small presence in northern Togo since 2021, with several attacks carried out since then.); Ivory Coast (Note: Jihadist groups have little to no presence on Ivorian soil, but have occasionally launched attacks along the Burkinabe-Ivorian border since 2019. AQIM attacked Grand-Bassam in 2016 as well.); Algeria (Note: No jihadist groups are active on Algerian soil, although the country has been attacked several times in the early days of the Mali War by jihadist groups. Diplomatic relations between the AES states and Algeria have been bad due to Algeria allowing FLA rebels on their soil, but a diplomatic restart was launched in 2026.); Nigeria France (only against jihadist until 2022) Russia (2022–present)	Al-Qaeda; JNIM; Nigerian Brigade; Katiba Macina; Ansarul Islam; Ansaru; Boko Haram; Islamic State; IS-SP; Lakurawa (2023–present); (Islamic State) ISWAP	Azawad Liberation Front; Nigerien anti-coup movement; Patriotic Front for Justice; Free Armed Forces; Patriotic Movement for Freedom and Justice; Former belligerents: CSP-PSD (2023-2024); Coordination of Azawad Movements (2014–2021, 2023–2024); MNLA (2012–2024); HCUA (2013–2024); MAA (2012–2024) GATIA (al-Mahmoud faction) (2023–2024) (Note: Faction affiliated with the CSP-PSD) Patriotic Liberation Front (2023–2024)

Commanders and leaders
Assimi Goïta; Ibrahim Traoré; Abdourahamane Tiani; Romuald Wadagni; Fauré Gnassingbé; Alassane Ouattara; Abdelmadjid Tebboune; Former commanders: (Mali) Amadou Toumani Touré (Mali) Dioncounda Traoré (Mali) Ibrahim Boubacar Keïta (Mali) Bah Ndaw (Mali) Sadio Camara † (Mauritania) Mohamed Ould Abdel Aziz (Burkina Faso) Roch Marc Christian Kaboré (Burkina Faso) Paul-Henri Sandaogo Damiba (Niger) Mahamadou Issoufou (Niger) Mohamed Bazoum (Benin) Thomas Boni Yayi Patrice Talon	Iyad Ag Ghaly; Amadou Koufa; Sedane Ag Hita; Djaffar Dicko; Former commanders: Abdelmalek Droukdel † Ibrahim Malam Dicko † Abou Zeid † Mokhtar Belmokhtar † Ahmed al-Tilemsi †; (Islamic State) Bakura Doro; (Islamic State) Abubakar Shekau ‡‡; (Islamic State) Abu al-Bara' al-Sahrawi; (Islamic State) Adnan Abu Walid al-Sahrawi †	Bilal Ag Acherif; Rhissa Ag Boula; Fahad Ag Almahmoud †

Strength
Total armed forces: Mali: 40,000; AFISMA: 2,900; Niger: 12,000; Chad: 30,350; France: 5,100 deployed in the Sahel	JNIM: 10.000 (2026) 6.000 (2025); MUJAO: ~500; Al-Mourabitoun: Fewer than 100; Ansar Dine: 300–10.000; Islamic State 2.000–3.000	FLA: 4.000 (2025); MNLA: 2.800–4.000 (2012); Coordination of Azawad Movements: thousands

Casualties and losses
Unknown	Unknown	Unknown
- 68,933+ people killed (Note: 22,074 from 2007–2022, 12,000+ in 2023 13,806+ in 2024 21,053 killed in 2025); 46,859+ killed (2023—present); 3 million displaced

The War in the Sahel, also known as the Sahel War, is a multi-sided armed conflict that has been ongoing since 2012. The conflict mainly takes place in the countries of Mali, Niger and Burkina Faso.

The conflict began during the early stages of the Mali War, which itself was a conflict caused by the Insurgency in the Maghreb. As Islamist Tuareg rebels overran Mali in 2012, a concurrent insurgency in Nigeria, led by Boko Haram, began to spread to nearby countries. By 2015, the Mali war had spread to Burkina Faso and Niger, which led to heavy fighting and humanitarian crises in both countries.

The conflict in Nigeria also reached a climax before a 2015 coalition offensive forced insurgents into remission. By 2019, the effects of the region-wide conflict began to accelerate as widespread anger over government ineffectiveness led to a series of coups in Mali, Niger, Sudan, Burkina Faso, Chad and Guinea, which became known as the "Coup Belt".

== Background ==
=== Algerian incursions (1990s–2007) ===
Amid the Algerian Civil War in the late 1990s, militants from the radical Islamist Armed Islamic Group (GIA) established connections with drug traffickers in Mali, Niger, Mauritania, and southern Algeria in order to establish supply lines and logistical support. However, the GIA did not establish themselves as a militant group in the Sahel until 2003. Mokhtar Belmokhtar, the commander of the Salafist Group for Preaching and Combat (GSPC) in southern Algeria, the GIA's successor, was on the losing side of an Algerian army offensive in the early 2000s. In December 2002, after an ambush near In Salah that killed several of his men, Belmokhtar crossed the Algerian border and settled in Mali. He reached Lerneb, near the Mauritanian border, and formed an alliance with the Berabich by marrying a daughter of the influential Hamaha family of the Oulad Idriss chiefdom. Belmokhtar enriched his in-laws through raids and preaching, and his in-laws protected him and gave him a local base. Other jihadists like Nabil Abou Alqama followed Belmokhtar's example. The Malian government did not react to these developments as to not anger the jihadists.

=== Al-Qaeda in the Islamic Maghreb insurgency (2003–2011) ===
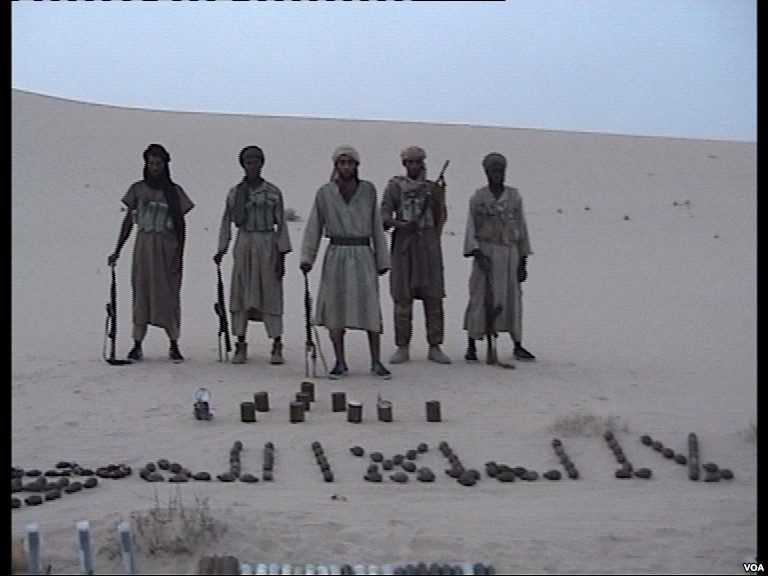
AQIM militants in the Algerian desert, 2011

The first kidnappings of Western nationals began in 2003. In February and March that year, 32 tourists, mostly Germans and Austrians, were kidnapped by Abderreza El Para, who had fled to Mali. Some hostages were freed by Algerian forces, but the remainder were under Belmokhtar's control. Malian officials sent two notables, Iyad Ag Ghaly and Baba Ould Cheikh, to negotiate for the hostages. The hostages were released on August 18 for a ransom of 5 million euros. Para was arrested by Chadian authorities shortly after the hostage-taking.

On June 4, 2005, in response to a series of arrests of jihadists and Mauritanian Islamists by Mauritanian officials and the announced participation of Mauritanian troops in American army exercises in the Sahel, the GSPC attacked Mauritanian troops at Lemgheity, killing 17 soldiers and taking 35 prisoner. While the attack was the start of the GSPC insurgency in Mauritania, it was more notable for the comment made by Abu Musab al-Zarqawi congratulating the Maghrebi mujahideen. This led to a warming of relations between al-Qaeda and the GSPC, with al-Qaeda in the Islamic Maghreb being formed in January 2007.

In the summer of 2007, Abdelmalek Droukdel, head of the GSPC/AQIM, deemed Belmokhtar as too independent and removed him as "emir of the Sahara", a position he gave to Yahia Djouadi. Droukdel split the Sahara zone in two; the first, comprising southwest Algeria and northern Mali with Mauritania under Belmokhtar's control. The second, comprising northeastern Mali, Niger, and western Chad, went to Abou Zeid. Belmokhtar opposed this decision and formed a new katiba, starting a rivalry between him and Abou Zeid.

Meanwhile, clashes between Mauritanian forces and AQIM continued through 2008. The killing of five French tourists near Aleg, Mauritania in late December 2007 led to the cancellation of the 2008 Dakar Rally. Twelve Mauritanian soldiers were also found decapitated by AQIM near Tourine. The accession of Mohamed Ould Abdel Aziz in 2009 changed the situation; utilizing French and American support, the Mauritanian military was overhauled and restructured, forming a locally-driven counter-insurgency strategy. Under Abdel Aziz, Mauritanian forces curbed AQIM attacks and even entered Malian territory to ambush the jihadists. By the end of 2011, Mauritania and AQIM were under a non-aggression pact.

=== Organized crime connections ===
Tuareg leaders, in the 1990s and 2000s, began forming connections with prominent Arab drug traffickers in central Mali, particularly around the cities of Gao and Timbuktu. The first drug trafficked through Mali was hashish, but expanded to cocaine by the 2000s. Tuareg youth would join the organized crime routes as smugglers and handlers. The Air Cocaine scandal in 2009 brought media attention to the crisis, after a plane filled with 11 tons of cocaine crashed in the Malian desert.

At the start of the Mali War in 2012, drug kingpins began collaborating with Tuareg arms smugglers to funnel the rebels' and jihadists' efforts to capture territory. This included AQIM and its allies, Ansar Dine and MUJAO, with civilians and soldiers reporting that the jihadist groups had copious access to cocaine and other drugs, along with the jihadist groups escorting drug convoys across the desert.

=== Libyan crisis ===
In early 2011, as part of the Arab Spring, Libyan protesters rose up against the dictator Muammar Gaddafi, who responded with brutal suppression of the protests. Many protesters took up guns, and following a several-month long civil war, overthrew Gaddafi's government and killed him. Many Malian and Nigerien soldiers of Gaddafi's former Islamic Legion fought with pro-Gaddafi forces during the civil war, but fled to their home countries following the rebels' victory. These soldiers were predominantly Tuareg or Sahelien Arab groups like Bella, all minorities in their home countries.

The former soldiers returned to an unstable peace in Kidal Region and Ménaka Region, where Malian Tuaregs held positions of local authority in the army as part of peace deals following the Tuareg rebellion of 2007–2009. Despite low-level violence being committed by Tuareg separatist militias until 2011, the majority of battle-hardened Tuareg leaders like Iyad Ag Ghaly had defected to the Malian Army in exchange for authority and promises of economic development in the rural Kidal Region.

With Libya providing Tuareg rebels a safe haven prior to their civil war, many rebels and Islamic Legion soldiers held an allegiance to a Tuareg identity over a Malian one, even if they were in the Malian army. Returning to a region that the Malian government had neglected, along with new access to weapons and supply chains from the former Libyan government, many Tuaregs were ready to revolt again.

== Mali ==
A map showing the fullest extent of rebel-held territory, January 2013

The military situation in Mali in 2026. For a detailed map, see here.

=== Tuareg rebellion of 2012 ===
In late 2011, Ibrahim Ag Bahanga, an irredentist Tuareg militia leader who was one of the last hold-outs of the 2006–2009 war, founded the National Movement for the Liberation of Azawad (MNLA), which drew a support base from all Tuareg clans. The MNLA sought independence for a Tuareg state named Azawad located in northern Mali. This state, in practice, would include many non-Tuareg groups like the Songhai, Fulani, Bella, Arabs, and different clans of Tuareg. Many of these groups had collaborated with the Tuaregs or the Malian government depending on what was more advantageous for their community, with the Songhai most notably forming the self-defense militias Ganda Koy and Ganda Iso to fight alongside the government during the 1990s Tuareg rebellion. Bahanga's goal with the MNLA was to unite all Tuaregs under one organization in order to avoid fragmentation.

Bahanga largely succeeded with his unification until 2012, when Ansar Dine was formed by Iyad Ag Ghaly. Ghaly's goal was to form a state in Mali under a strict interpretation of sharia law. Ansar Dine recruited many Ifoghas Tuaregs, the dominant clan in Kidal Region and Ghaly's clan, from the MNLA. Ansar Dine received support from AQIM and another jihadist group, Movement for Oneness and Jihad in West Africa (MUJAO), that had split off from AQIM in late 2011.

The MNLA and jihadist alliance captured many cities and Malian bases in a surprise offensive in January 2012. By the end of January, the cities of Tessalit, Aguelhok, Andéramboukane, Léré, and Ménaka had been captured by the rebel alliance. In the first week of February, the MNLA captured Tinzaouaten and began fighting for Kidal. Discontent grew in Bamako by March, when the towns of Diré, Goundam, and Niafunké came under MNLA control, often without fighting. Jeremy Keenan said in 2012 regarding the MNLA-jihadist alliance, "What seems to happen is that when they move into a town, the MNLA take out the military base—not that there's much resistance—and Iyad [ag Aghaly] goes into town and puts up his flag and starts bossing everyone around about sharia law."

On March 21, Malian soldiers overthrew President Amadou Toumani Touré due to his lackluster response to the rebellion, with Amadou Sanogo taking over in a junta. Sanogo later passed power peacefully to Dioncounda Traoré.

==== Falls of Timbuktu and Gao and rebel infighting ====
Despite the coup, Kidal fell on March 30 and Gao one day later. The fall of Gao was the start of public disputes between the MNLA and the jihadist groups, as there were conflicting reports of who actually controlled the town. As with other cities, the MNLA entered both cities but jihadist groups took up the administrative control. In Kidal, that was Ansar Dine; in Gao, it was both MUJAO and Ansar Dine.

Timbuktu and Douentza fell in the first week of April, and the MNLA declared Azawadi independence on April 6. With the seizure of Douentza, the MNLA ceased fighting and said that all of Azawadi territory was liberated. This directly contradicted Ansar Dine's goals, with the group seeking to spread Sharia across all of Mali and past its borders. Immediately after the declaration of Azawadi independence, several Tuareg groups sprung up against the MNLA, with the Arab Movement of Azawad (MAA) forming a pro-government and pro-rebel faction on April 8.

After failed negotiations between the MNLA and Ansar Dine in May, anti-MNLA protests began in Gao supported by MOJWA and Ansar Dine. Clashes broke out between the two groups, and the jihadist alliance seized power after a short battle. By August, the MNLA was forced out of every major city they had taken, and Ghaly was declared emir of the new Azawadi Islamic state.

The jihadist alliance began imposing strict interpretations of Sharia in the territories it controlled, destroying many mausolea of the World Heritage Site of Timbuktu and holding public executions of people who defied Sharia. The imposition of punishments and Sharia law was considered by analysts a reason for the collapse of the Islamic Azawadi state—Droukdel later admitted his own commanders' rushed implementation was the reason for their collapse.

=== Foreign intervention ===
By January 2013, Islamist forces advanced to 600 km from the capital and were closing in to capture the major town of Mopti. The MNLA began peace talks to realign with the Malian government while the French military launched Opération Serval on January 11, intervening in the conflict. The furthest that the jihadist coalition was able to advance was Konna, where they were defeated at the Battle of Konna, one of the most significant events of the war.

The new Malian government under Dioncounda Traoré requested the French support to repel the jihadist invasion, and additionally allowed in the European Union Training Mission in Mali (EUTM) and the UN-led African-led International Support Mission to Mali (AFISMA). Within a week of the French intervention that began on January 11, the jihadist offensive had been halted and reversed. French air raids wiped out jihadist strongholds in the Adrar des Ifoghas mountains, and helped Malian troops recapture every major northern city.

Another reason the jihadist alliance collapsed quickly was because of Belmokhtar's failed hostage crisis at an oil facility in In Amenas in southern Algeria in January 2013, where 800 people were taken hostage by AQIM. The expansion of the conflict to Algeria, combined with the southward offensive occurring at the same time, provoked France and international governments to respond quickly.

Targeted airstrikes wiped out jihadist leadership throughout 2013 and 2014. Abou Zeid was killed in February 2014, and smaller local commanders like Haroun Ag Said, Omar Ould Hamaha, Abu Bakr al-Nasr, Ahmed al-Tilemsi, and Abdallah al-Chinguetti were all assassinated. In 2013, French, Malian Tuareg, and Chadian troops launched an operation in the Ifoghas mountains, destroying the last AQIM base and effectively ending their territorial control. Operation Serval ended in July 2014, with the French government beginning Operation Barkhane and the United Nations founding MINUSMA to ensure long-term stability in the Sahel.

==== Insurgency and negotiations ====
Despite being effectively defeated with over a third of their manpower killed across all groups, jihadist organizations—particularly MUJAO in Gao—made great advances in recruiting from the Fulani and Songhai community in the area, with MUJAO sympathizers launching attacks on the city after Mali regained control in 2013 and 2014. Hardline Islamist survivors of Operation Serval fled to Libya to aid the Islamic State – Libya Province and the various al-Qaeda-aligned Libyan rebel groups like Ansar al-Sharia in their own conquests. Islamist militants from places like Niger and Burkina Faso found it easy to flee across the porous borders into their home countries, with Ibrahim Malam Dicko using his war experience in Ansar Dine to later expand jihadism into Burkina Faso.

The MNLA, on the other hand, offered a hesitant hand to Malian and French authorities in the aftermath of Serval. Many Tuaregs had moved from Ansar Dine to the MNLA and other secular Tuareg organizations in the hope of maintaining autonomy for northern Mali. France prevented southern Malian troops from taking part in the recapture of Tuareg cities like Menaka and Kidal, and left that to the pro-government Tuareg commander El Hadj Ag Gamou, the MNLA (in Kidal), and Chadians.

While negotiations and agreements were put in place for Tuareg autonomy with the 2015 Algiers Accords, these agreements were not upheld and neither side wanted to risk a new war with one another. As such, Kidal remained in MNLA hands until 2023, and secular Tuareg movements and the Malian government did not clash until that same year.

The transition to Operation Barkhane from Serval included a French ultimatum calling for the Malian government to democratize and hold elections. These elections, held in 2013, launched Ibrahim Boubacar Keïta to the presidency, and initially, relations were good between Tuaregs and the Malian government, France and Mali, and Mali and other nations. Serval also expanded to Burkina Faso and Niger, with troop deployments increasing in both countries. The Takuba Task Force and American troops also participated in regional security operations against jihadists.

== Border insurgencies and ethnicization ==
=== Porosity ===
Before the start of the 2012 Tuareg rebellion, the Malian borders with Niger and Burkina Faso were porous. Communities that lived along the border treated it as nonexistent. No Sahelian country had the manpower and resources to adequately control their borders outside of a few major border towns. Tuareg rebel leaders often fled back and forth between the Malian and Nigerien borders to evade capture during the 2006–2009 rebellions. During the Malian retreat from the north in the initial stages of the 2012 rebellion, Malian colonel El Hadj Ag Gamou and his troops fled towards Niamey across the Malian-Nigerien border.

Additionally, a large number of foreign fighters from across the Sahel joined the Islamist half of the Tuareg rebellion in 2012 and 2013. The most notable group was a small group of Boko Haram and Ansaru militants that fought alongside MUJAO in Gao. When Operation Serval decimated the rebellion, these foreign fighters fled back home with their war experience, like Dicko. Between 2013 and 2017, several attacks were committed across West Africa by small cells of al-Qaeda-aligned militants, particularly in Côte d'Ivoire and Ouagadougou in 2016.

=== Fulani grievances ===
In the wake of the French intervention, an ethnic Fulani preacher named Amadou Koufa began amassing followers for his oratory skills and calls for revolution among the Fulani caste system. The Fulani are a nomadic and staunchly conservative ethnic group in southern and central Mali, Burkina Faso, Niger, and other parts of West Africa. The Massina Empire, based in what is now central Mali, was an Islamic caliphate ruled by Fulani in the 19th century during the Fula jihads. In the decolonization period, many Fulani were marginalized and oppressed by West African nations due to their nomadic lifestyle, with their widespread populace making them a minority almost everywhere. Koufa rose to power through his radio and in-person sermons preaching hardline interpretations aligned with al-Qaeda theology. He mixed this with calls for a revolution against both the Malian state and the upper echelons of the Fulani social hierarchy, attracting many young Fulani across the Sahel.

==== Niger ====
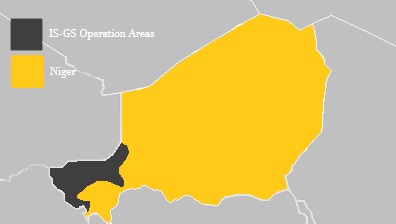
Map of Islamist insurgency in Niger

Niger faces jihadist insurgencies both in its western regions (as a result of the spill-over of the Mali War) and in its southeastern region (as a result of the spill-over of the Islamic insurgency in Nigeria). The insurgency in the west of the country began with incursions in 2015 and intensified from 2017 onwards. Since 2021, attacks were carried out with greater frequency in the country.

==== Burkina Faso ====
Map of Islamist insurgency in Burkina Faso

The insurgency in the Sahel spread to Burkina Faso in 2015, beginning with an attack on a gendarme by alleged Boko Haram members. In 2016, the amount of attacks spiked after a new group, Ansarul Islam, was founded by imam Ibrahim Malam Dicko.

Since 2021, the insurgency in Burkina Faso has spread to neighboring countries of Ivory Coast, Ghana, Benin and Togo. On 8 February 2022, insurgents attacked the W National Park in Benin, killing nine people. On 11 May 2022, militants crossed the border into Togo and killed eight soldiers.

=== 2020s ===
Beginning in the early 2020s, numerous coups were staged in the Sahel, Mali in 2020 and 2021, Chad, two in Burkina Faso in January and September 2022, and Niger in 2023.

In 2024 Niger, Burkina Faso and Mali formed a confederation called the Alliance of Sahel States. On 21 January 2025, they decided to create a joint armed force of 5,000 soldiers to fight regional jihadism in the Sahel.

== Boko Haram and ISWAP insurgency ==
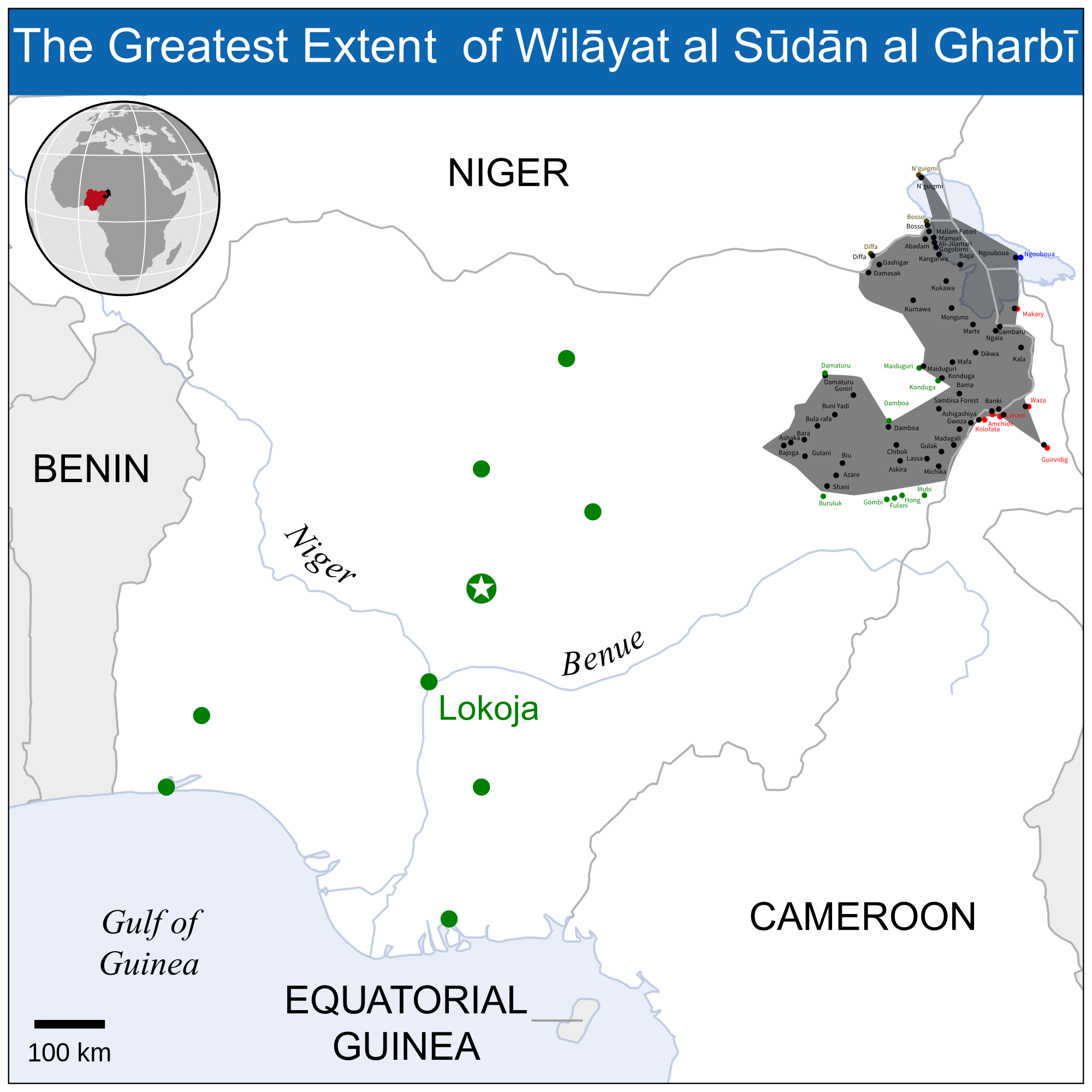
Boko Haram's territorial control prior to the 2015 West African offensive

Having cooperated and trained alongside AQIM in the Sahel since 2006, the Nigerian Islamist group Boko Haram began expanding into Chad and Niger in 2014 after successfully seizing territory in the insurgency in Nigeria. By then controlling a significant area around Lake Chad, a coalition of Western African countries launched an offensive against the group in January 2015. The group eventually ended its alliance with al-Qaeda, pledging allegiance to ISIL in March 2015. By the end of 2015 Boko Haram had largely retreated into the Sambisa Forest in Nigeria. Though attacks have continued, including in Niger.

== Timeline ==
=== 2012 ===
- January 16 – The start of the Mali civil war.

=== 2013 ===
- May 23 – Twin suicide attacks occur in Niger targeting a military base in Agadez and a uranium mine in Arlit.

=== 2014 ===
- December 11 – French troops in Mali killed top Islamist commander Ahmed al Tilemsi. Tilemsi was a founding member of Movement for Unity and Jihad in West Africa (MUJWA) and held a $5 million bounty.

=== 2015 ===
- November 20 – Al-Qaeda in the Islamic Maghreb attacked an Hotel in Bamako, the capital of Mali, killing 20 people, and taking hostage another 170.
- November 28 – Ansar Dine attacked UN peacekeepers in Kidal killing 2 soldiers and one contractor.

=== 2016 ===
- January 15 – Gunmen armed with heavy weapons attacked the Cappuccino restaurant and the Splendid Hotel in the heart of Ouagadougou, the capital of Burkina Faso. The number of fatalities reached 30, while at least 56 were wounded; a total of 176 hostages were released after a government counter-attack into the next morning as the siege ended. Three perpetrators were also killed. The nearby YIBI hotel was then under siege, where another attacker was killed. Notably, former Swiss MPs Jean-Noël Rey and Georgie Lamon were killed. Responsibility for the attack was claimed by Al-Qaeda in the Islamic Maghreb (AQIM) and Al-Mourabitoun.
- February 5 – A UN base in Mali was attacked by unknown Islamists.
- February 11 – Suspected Islamist militants killed two civilians and a customs officer and burned a car in an attack on a customs post in Mopti, central Mali.
- February 12 – Five UN peacekeepers killed in Kidal, Mali and over at least 30 wounded, from an insurgent attack.
- February 15 – AQIM confirmed the death of MOJWA spokesman, Omar Ould Hamaha, in a France airstrike.
- February 23 – Gunmen attacked a checkpoint southwest of the Malian town of Timbuktu overnight killing three soldiers and wounding two others.
- March 1 – It is reported that France special forces conducted two separated raids killing a Spanish AQIM commander, Abu al Nour al Andalusi, and two fighters of Al-Mourabitoun.
- March 6 – Ansar Dine claims four attacks across Mali, detonating three UN vehicles in Kidal, Tesslitnear, Aguelhok and an attack on a UN camp in Kidal with rockets, meanwhile defense ministers from West Africa's semi-arid Sahel region have agreed to work together to establish special rapid reaction force, named the G5 Sahel, to counter the growing threat from al Qaeda and Islamic State-linked militants.
- March 10 – Warring Tuareg clans in northern Mali have agreed to cease hostilities after tit-for-tat violence killed dozens of people from the start of the year.
- March 13–14 – 2016 Grand-Bassam shootings: AQIM and Al-Mourabitoun attacked the town of Grand-Bassam, in the Ivory Coast, killing at least 18 people, including three members of the country's special forces, and four European tourists. Three of six assailants were also killed.
- March 15 – AQIM branch said its attack in the Ivory Coast on March 13 that killed 18 people was revenge for the France Operation Barkhane against Islamist militants in the Sahel region and called for its forces to withdraw. Also, Ivory Coast has raised its security alert to the highest level and President Alassane Ouattara has pledged that the country would not be "intimidated by terrorists" following the attack of March 13 that killed 18 people.
- March 16 – The French government said it will deploy a paramilitary police force in the capital of Burkina Faso to react quickly in the event of new attacks by Islamist militants in West Africa, after the Ivory Coast attack by AQIM.
- March 19 – Three policemen were shot dead by AQIM soldiers in a Niger village near the border with Burkina Faso. One soldier was killed and two others wounded when a military convoy was attacked close to Nigeria's border by Boko Haram fighters.
- March 22 – AQIM attacked a European Union military training mission's headquarters in the Malian capital, Bamako, which left an insurgent dead. On the same day, the Ivory Coast arrested the suspected leader and other 15 militants of the AQIM group that conducted the beach attacks of March 13. The man is named Kounta Dallah.
- March 23 – 21 AQIM suspects were captured by the Malian police in response to their attack on an EU base in Bamako.
- March 27 – Two AQIM fighters were arrested in Mali over Ivory Coast resort attack.
- April 9 – Ansar Dine claimed two bombings on the Aguelhok-Tessalit axis just north of the city of Kidal.
- April 10 – Gunmen ambushed a Malian military patrol outside of Timbuktu near the town of Gourma, injuring three soldiers.
- April 12 – Three French soldiers were killed by an IED in northern Mali. Also, another two Malian soldiers and one Chadian were killed by land mines.
- April 22 – Malian police captured the AQIM mastermind of the terrorist attacks of November 2015 in Radisson blu hotel in Bamako. The man identified as a Mauritanian by the name of Fawaz Ould Ahmeida.
- July 31 – In Timbuktu, northern Mali, a captain of the Malian army was killed by four AQIM members
- September 2 – In Markoye, Burkina Faso killed ISIS members one border guard and a civilian.
- September 9 – 3 Malian troops were killed after suspected AQIM fighters ambushed them in the centre of the country.
- September 26 – In Timbuktu, Mali a military guard and his cousin were killed in their house by terrorists.
- October 3 – One Blue helmet was killed and eight others were injured in an attack on their base in Aguelhok, Mali. AQIM claimed the attack
- October 6 – The Malian refugee camp Tazalit in the Tasara region was attacked by forty assailants, presumably AQIM. Twenty people were killed (all site security forces). One refugee was injured.
- October 9 – One of the main Tuareg leaders of Mali, Cheikh Ag Awssa, military head of the High Council of Azawad (HCUA, French acronym), died Saturday when the vehicle he was traveling with his son stepped on a mine, reported today the Coordinator movements of Azawad (CMA).
- October 12 – Burkina Faso's defense ministry says heavily armed assailants have attacked a military position in the north near the Mali border, killing three soldiers and wounding another. ISIS claims responsibility for the attack.
- October 14 – An American aid worker has been kidnapped in a town northeast of Niger's capital Niamey, before being taken by his abductors to Mali, according to a security source. Armed men raided the house of the aid worker on Friday, killing his two guards before driving him off across the desert, the mayor of the town of Abalak said on Saturday.
- November 3 – A peacekeeper was killed and five others were injured when militants attacked a military base. After the shooting, a bomb exploded, killing one soldier and injuring dozens more. AQIM claims the attack.
- November 4 – A French soldier was killed and four others injured after that their truck exploded because of a land mine in the north of Kidal. Ansar Dine claimed the attack.
- November 5 – An al-Qaeda-linked group has released a video showing the purported execution of two Malians accused of collaborating with French counter-terrorism forces in Mali.
- November 6:
  - A convoy of MINUSMA was attacked in the center of Mali, about 25 km north of the town of Douentza. The convoy hit a mine or an IED and the assailants are then out of hiding by opening fire. One peacekeeper died, seven others were wounded. Ansar Dine claimed the attack.
  - A Togolese peacekeeper was killed along with two civilians when the convoy was attacked in Gourma, Mali. AQIM claims the attack.
  - Militants attack a military base, killing a Togolese in Gourma-Rharous Cercle, Mali. AQIM claims the attack.
  - Militants raided in a prison and freeing 21 prisoners. They also kidnapped a guard in Banamba, Mali. Ansar Dine claims the attack
- November 11–12 – In Gao, Mali have one of the positions of the Malian army was targeted by terrorists on motorcycle. Two soldiers were injured. Al-Mourabitoun claims the attack.
- November 13:
  - Militants attacked a military checkpoint, in Gao, Mali killing one soldier and injuring other two.
  - Two people were killed in two attacks in Djibo.
- December 6 – Al-Qaeda militants attacked a prison in Niono, Mali. Two guards were injured. Dozens of prisoners have escaped.
- December 16 – 2016 Nassoumbou attack: Several dozen heavily armed gunmen attacked an army outpost near the border with Mali, leaving at least 12 soldiers dead and 2 others missing.
- December 22 – Six gunmen on motorcycles attacked Saye's military soldier in Mali and shot the gendarmes on the scene, one soldier was killed and several were wounded.
- December 24 – A Frenchwoman was abducted in the city of Gao.

=== 2017 ===
- January 2 – One person was killed and another was injured in two separate shooting attacks in Djibo, Burkina Faso.
- January 12 – Five Malian soldiers were killed and two others injured when their patrol hit a landmine in Mali's Segou region.
- January 18 – 2017 Gao bombing: Five suicide bombers exploded near a NATO army base in Gao, Mali. At least 65 people were killed while an unknown number of people were injured. There were no reported casualties among the NATO troops. Al-Mourabitoun claimed responsibility.
- January 24 – A peacekeeper in Mali was killed and two other peacekeepers were injured in mortar fire in Aguelhok. Al-Qaeda is suspected for the attack.
- January 30 – Two civilians were injured in a terrorist attack in Madougou, Mali.
- February 4 – Four soldiers were killed and eight others were injured in a terrorist attack in Ménaka of Mali.
- February 5 – Four Chadian soldiers were killed in a bomb attack.
- February 27 – Two police stations in Tongomayel and Baraboulé were attacked overnight by suspected jihadists. The Ansar ul Islam militant group, which has links to the Ansar Dine extremist movement in Mali, said it staged the attacks.
- March 3 – Ansar ul Islam militants on motorbikes killed two people including a school director.
- March 5 – Eleven soldiers were killed and four others were injured in an attack on a position of the Malian Army close to the border with Burkina Faso.
- March 6 – At least five Nigerien gendarmes were killed in the night during a likely terrorist attack in the Tillabéri Region.
- March 11 – The muezzin of a mosque was found butchered by a suspected jihadist in Ivory Coast.
- March 13 – As reported by Iranian state news, two Malian soldiers and two Malian civilians were killed in a shooting attack.
- March 28 – Two soldiers and a civilian were killed in an attack at the border with Burkina Faso. Jama'at Nasr al-Islam wal-Muslimin claimed responsibility on April 1, 2017.
- April 6 – A French soldier was killed in the Sahel region, Mali after a clash with armed militants.
- April 9 – Five people were killed in an attack carried out by militants in Gargando, Mali.
- April 18:
  - Two soldiers and one civilian were injured during an attack against their UN convoy in Mali.
  - Four Malian soldiers were killed when terrorists attacked their base. Sixteen other soldiers were also injured.
- May 3 – 3 rockets struck the MINUSMA Super Camp at Timbuktu Airport around leaving 1 peacekeeper dead and 9 wounded.
- May 14 – In Mali four members of the Red Cross were abducted. The memers were on the road in Ténenkou in the central region of Mopti on Sunday to assess the humanitarian situation there.
- May 23 – Two peacekeepers of the United Nations Multidimensional Integrated Stabilization Mission in Mali (MINUSMA) were killed and another injured on Tuesday morning in an ambush in the northern Kidal region.
- August 13 – 2017 Ouagadougou attack.
- October 4 – An ambush in Niger near the Malian border leaves four U.S. Special Forces soldiers, five Nigerien soldiers and 21 ISGS militants dead during a joint patrol.
- December 6 – US and Nigerien forces kill 11 ISGS militants in a firefight.

=== 2018 ===
- January 27 – At least 14 Malian soldiers have been killed and 18 others wounded in an AQIM attack during which fighters briefly took control of a military camp in Soumpi, Timbuktu region. They retreated later. Two terrorists were also killed.
- March 2 – 2018 Ouagadougou attacks.

=== 2019 ===
- January 1–2 – Yirgou massacre. In northern Burkina Faso, six villagers are killed by jihadists. Koglweogo (Mossi "bush guardians") react by massacring between 49 and 210 (reports vary widely) Fula.
- January 20 – AQIM claims the attack on 10 UN Mali peacekeepers due to Chad's restoration of relations with Israel.
- February 6 – Five Burkina Faso gendarmes are killed in a supposed terrorist attack at Oursi in the Sahel region.
- February 24 – The Burkina Faso military takes out 29 suspected militants through an air force and army operation.
- March 19 – A raid in a Mali military camp leaves 16 Malian soldiers dead.
- May 9 – Burkina Faso hostage rescue.
- May 16 – 28 Nigerien soldiers are ambushed and killed while patrolling near the Mali border.
- June 14 – An Aérospatiale Gazelle operated by the French Army Light Aviation was damaged by 7.62 mm machinegun fire and had to make an emergency landing in the town of Liptako but was then destroyed to stop it falling into enemy hands.
- July 1 – At least 18 soldiers were killed and another four were missing in action when two suicide car bombers attacked a Nigerien army outpost around the town of Inates before attempting to storm the camp. The Islamic State in the Greater Sahara is suspected of responsibility. Niger's capital Niamey is expected to host the African Union summit on July 7 and 8.
- July 11 – Ten UN peacekeepers were wounded by a roadside mine near Kidal, northern Mali.
- July 22 – Six Estonians and "around the same number" of French soldiers were wounded when suicide bombers struck a French military base in Gao.
- August 21 – Twenty-four soldiers of Burkina Faso's army were killed in an attack on a military base in the country's north. Five soldiers were ambushed and killed by militants in central Mali, near the towns of Hombori and Boni.
- August 29 – Three soldiers were killed and another seven wounded in Koro, Mali, after being attacked by militants. At least one attacker was killed.
- September 3 – A bomb planted in a bus exploded in Mopti, Mali, killing 20 civilians and wounding 15 more.
- September 8 – A food convoy and a transport truck were attacked by militants in two different incidents in northern Burkina Faso, killing at least 29 people in total.
- September 9 – Six Burkinabe police officers were ambushed and killed by suspected jihadists in Soum Province.
- September 19 – Five soldiers were killed and two were wounded in an overnight attack by unknown gunmen against a military patrol.
- September 23 – Nine people were killed after terrorists opened fire on a group of people in two locations near Bourzanga.
- September 25 – Six civilians were shot dead after armed militants stormed three villages in the city of Zimtenga.
- September 28 – Nine people were killed after terrorists stormed the village of Komsilga, while seven others were killed during another attack in Deneon. Later, a soldier was shot dead.
- September 30 – Attacks on two military posts in Mopti Region, Mali, left 38 soldiers dead and more than 60 others missing, while the posts themselves were destroyed. The attack was one of the worst to hit Mali's military in years. At least 15 militants were reportedly killed in the attack.
- October 1 – Six civilians were killed by militants in a camp for displaced people in Kangro, Burkina Faso.
- October 4 – Dolmane gold mine attack: About 20 people were killed in Soum, Burkina Faso, when militants attacked a gold mining site. Meanwhile, it was estimated that the surge of Islamist violence in Burkina Faso forced more than 300,000 people to flee the north of the country, while 2,000 schools were closed.
- October 6 – A roadside bomb exploded as a vehicle containing UN peacekeepers passed by, killing one of the peacekeepers and injuring four others. The bombing occurred in Aguelhok in northern Mali. A soldier was shot and wounded in a related incident.
- October 7 – Militants clashed with the Nigerien military in a valley in Dogondoutchi, leaving two soldiers dead and five more wounded.
- October 11 – Burkina Faso mosque attack: Armed men assaulted the Grand Mosque in Salmossi, northern Burkina Faso, killing 16 people and critically injuring two more.
- October 12 – Militants killed five officers in Sanam, in Niger's Tillaberi region.
- October 19 – Simultaneous attacks in northern Burkina Faso (in Loroum Province and Yatenga Province) left four soldiers and a police officer dead while another 11 soldiers were wounded.
- October 28 – Pobé Mengao shooting: Militants killed 16 civilians in Pobe Mengao, Burkina Faso, when the civilians refused to supply the armed Islamists with ammunition.
- November 1 – 2019 Indelimane attack: An attack on a Malian army base in Indelimane, in the country's north and near the border with Niger, left 53 soldiers and a civilian dead. The Islamic State in the Greater Sahara claimed responsibility for the attack, the worst in years.
- November 2 – The Islamic State in the Greater Sahara claimed responsibility for the death in Mali of a French soldier whose vehicle passed by an IED, which exploded. France confirmed the death.
- November 4 – An MP and deputy mayor was killed in Burkina Faso's Sahel Region by a roadside IED. Two others in his vehicle also died, while a fourth survived.
- November 6 – At least 37 people were killed and 60 more injured when militants attacked a gold mining convoy in Burkina Faso's Est Region. Although previous attacks in Burkina Faso were blamed on Al Qaeda groups, this attack bore the hallmarks of the Islamic State.
- November 18 – At least 30 Malian soldiers were killed and 23 more wounded when they were attacked by militants in the Gao region. The Malian military claimed at least 17 militants were also killed.
- November 22 – The bodies of 13 more Malian soldiers were found after the November 18 attack, which was claimed by the Islamic State in the Greater Sahara. The bodies were found in Tabankort and Infokaritene.
- November 25 – Thirteen French soldiers were killed when two helicopters collided with each other in the middle of an operation against militants in northern Mali. The accident was the worst loss for a European country in the Sahel since the beginning of anti-terrorism operations in 2013.
- December 1 – 2019 Burkina Faso church attacks: Militants attacked a church in Foutouri, Burkina Faso, killing 14 people and wounding dozens more.
- December 9 – Three soldiers and 14 militants were killed when insurgents attacked an army post in Agando, in western Tahoua, Niger.
- December 10 – At least 71 soldiers were killed, 30 more were missing, and at least 12 were wounded when militants staged a massive attack on a military base in Inates, near the border with Mali. The attack was the deadliest single incident Niger's military has ever experienced.
- December 21 – French President Emmanuel Macron announced that 33 militants were "neutralized" in a French military operation in central Mali, while also releasing two Malian gendarmes held hostage in Mopti. A militant was also arrested by the French soldiers.
- December 23 – France said it killed seven insurgents in Mopti, Mali, in its first-ever drone strike.
- December 24 – Insurgents killed seven soldiers and 35 people, mostly women, during a raid on a military outpost in Soum Province, Burkina Faso. The authorities claimed at least 80 militants were killed in the raid. Prior to the attack, Burkina security forces said they had killed about 100 fighters in several operations since November.
- December 25 – Eleven soldiers were killed when they were ambushed by militants in Hallele, Soum Province, Burkina Faso. At least five of the insurgents were also killed. Meanwhile, in southwest Niger, 14 security personnel were killed and another was missing after their convoy was attacked by gunmen in Sanam.

=== 2020 ===
- January 4 – Fourteen civilians were killed and four more were seriously injured when a roadside bomb exploded near their bus in Sourou Province, Burkina Faso. Many of the casualties were children returning from holidays.
- January 6 – Five soldiers were killed in a roadside bomb attack in the Alatona region of Mali.
- January 9 – At least 25 soldiers were killed when a large group of militants stormed a military base in Chinegodrar, Tillaberi, Niger. The Defense Ministry of Niger said more than 63 "terrorists" were killed during the battle. Meanwhile, a rocket attack on a base in Kidal region, Mali, wounded 20 people, including 18 UN peacekeepers.
- January 11 – The number of soldiers killed in the Chinegodrar attack in Niger two days ago rose to 89 from 25. The number of militants killed also rose to 77 from 63.
- January 20 – Insurgents killed 36 civilians during an attack on villages in Sanmatenga Province, northern Burkina Faso.
- January 21 – Two soldiers were killed by an IED in Mopti, Mali.
- January 23 – At least six soldiers were killed by militants in Dioungani, Mali.
- January 25 – Insurgents killed 39 civilians in Soum Province, northern Burkina Faso.
- January 26 – At least 20 soldiers were killed by militants during an attack on a military outpost in Segou Region, Mali. Five more were wounded. Residents reported that the fighting lasted only two hours, and that the well-armed insurgents had quickly surrounded and raided the base before withdrawing, taking captured supplies and dead comrades with them.
- February 2 – France announced it would deploy 600 more soldiers to the Sahel to fight the deteriorating security situation in the region, bringing the total up to 5,100 troops from 4,500.
- February 3 – Insurgents killed at least 18 civilians in Bani Department, northern Burkina Faso.
- February 6 – In Tillaberi, Niger, four gunmen on motorbikes opened fire on workers in a village, killing four people
- February 7 – French forces killed 30 insurgents in the Gourma and Liptako regions of Mali in the past two days.
- February 13 – Troops returned to Kidal, northern Mali, following a six-year absence, after former Tuareg rebels allowed them into the city.
- February 14 – At least 31 people were killed when armed men stormed the central Mali village of Ogossagou. Several members of a quick reaction force sent by MINUSMA to the village during the attack were wounded. On the same day, eight soldiers were killed and four more injured in an ambush in central Gao region, while a soldier was killed in an attack on a military camp in Mondoro.
- February 16 – Gunmen killed 24 people and wounded 18 more in an attack on a church in Yagha province, northern Burkina Faso. Last week, a pastor was killed and another abducted in the same province.
- February 17 – A French soldier died in unspecified circumstances in Burkina Faso.
- February 27 – The African Union announced the deployment of an anti-terrorism force of 3,000 soldiers in the Sahel to combat the rising insecurity there.
- March 8 – At least 43 people were killed during an attack on two Fulani villages in Yatenga Province, northern Burkina Faso. The perpetrators were likely militiamen that blame the Fulani people for harboring extremist groups in the country.
- March 13 – An Italian man and a Canadian woman were released in Kidal, Mali, after being kidnapped by a militant group Burkina Faso in December 2018.
- March 19 – Militants attacked an army base in Tarkint, Gao Province, northern Mali, killing at least 29 soldiers and leaving five more wounded.
- March 25 – The Malian URD opposition leader Soumaila Cisse was abducted along with six others near Niafunké, central Mali. The abductors killed his bodyguard and wounded two more.
- March 29 – Nine people were killed when their vehicle hit a landmine in central Mali.
- March 30 – Three soldiers were killed and another three were wounded when their vehicle struck a roadside bomb in central Mali.
- April 6 – At least 25 soldiers were killed in an attack on a military base in Bamba, northern Mali.
- April 9 – President Idriss Déby of Chad said his country's troops will no longer engage in military operations abroad in order to focus on fighting militants and rebels at home. Chad is part of MNJTF, which focuses on fighting extremists in the Lake Chad region, and the G5 Sahel force, which focuses on fighting extremists in the Sahel region. Thousands of Chadian soldiers will withdraw from bases in Niger, Mali and Nigeria by April 22.
- April 10 – Security forces allegedly executed 31 unarmed Fulani people hours after arresting them in Djibo, northern Burkina Faso.
- May 1 – A French Foreign Legion soldier died of his injuries after being wounded last week by an IED explosion on his tank in Mali.
- May 10 – At least 20 people were killed by gunmen in the Tillaberi region of southwest Niger. Meanwhile, three Chadian soldiers were killed and four more seriously wounded when their convoy hit a roadside bomb in Aguelhok, northern Mali.
- May 11 – A clash between the Burkinabe military and armed militants in Yagha Province left eight soldiers and 20 militants dead.
- May 27 – Ethnic clashes between Fulani herdsmen and Dogon tribesmen in central Mali left 27 civilians dead.
- May 28 – An attack on a rebel camp in a province in northern Burkina Faso left 10 militants and one soldier dead, according to reports.
- May 29 – An attack on a trading convoy in Loroum Province, northern Burkina Faso, left at least 15 people dead and several more wounded.
- May 30 – An aid convoy was attacked by militants near Barsalogho, northern Burkina Faso, leaving at least five civilians and five gendarmes dead.
- May 31 – Militants attacked a market in Kompienbiga, Burkina Faso, killing around 30 people before fleeing on motorbikes. Meanwhile, in the Tahoua Region of western Niger, about 50 gunmen stormed the Intikane refugee camp, killing at least three camp officials and destroying parts of the camp before fleeing.
- June 3 – The French army and local partners killed Abdelmalek Droukdel, the leader of AQIM, along with some of his associates during an operation in northern Mali. The French also stated that they were holding an ISGA leader who was captured in Mali on May 19. Meanwhile, an attack on the Fulani village of Niangassadiou in Mopti region, Mali, left 14 villagers dead.
- June 5 – An attack on the Fulani village of Binedama in Mopti region, Mali, left 29 villagers dead and the village burned down.
- June 11 – Militants in Burkina Faso attacked an Ivory Coast border post, killing 10 soldiers and wounding six more, while one militant was killed. The attack was the first on the country since the 2016 Grand-Bassam shootings.
- June 12 – Two UN peacekeepers were killed during an attack on their convoy between Tessalit and Gao in Mali's north.
- June 14 – An ambush of a convoy near Bouka Were, central Mali, left "dozens" of soldiers killed or missing. At least 24 were confirmed dead while another 12 remain missing.
- June 24 – Armed men abducted 10 aid workers distributing food in a village in the Tillaberi region of southwest Niger.
- July 1 – At least 32 civilians were killed when they were shot at by gunmen on motorbikes in an attack on four ethnic Dogon villages in central Mali's Mopti region.
- July 2 – Soldiers investigating the massacre yesterday in Mali's Mopti region were themselves attacked, leaving nine soldiers dead and two more wounded.
- July 6 – Five soldiers, a town mayor, and two "trackers" were killed when militants ambushed a convoy escorting Pensa town hall members, northern Burkina Faso. Three others also went missing.
- July 8 – A Human Rights Watch report claimed that at least 180 recently deceased corpses were found in mass graves in Djibo, northern Burkina Faso, with the watch group alleging they were killed by government forces.
- July 16 – At least 12 Dogon villagers were killed in central Mali when they were attacked by gunmen on motorcycles.
- July 20 – Two soldiers were killed and five more were wounded in an attack by militants on a Burkina Faso town in Komondjari Province.
- July 23 – A French soldier was killed during a firefight in Mali after he stepped on an explosive.
- August 2 – Twin attacks in Ségou Region, central Mali, left five soldiers dead.
- August 7 – About 20 people were killed by militants during an attack on a cattle market in Fada N'Gourma, eastern Burkina Faso.
- August 9 – Six French aidworkers and two Nigerien volunteers were killed when they were attacked by militants near Kouré, in southwest Niger.
- September 4 – An ambush on a troop convoy left 10 Malian soldiers dead in Nara, Mali.
- September 5 – Two French soldiers were killed and a third was injured when their vehicle was hit by an IED in Tessalit Province, Mali.
- September 26 – Six militia fighters were killed when jihadists attack them in Burkina.
- October 8 – 25 men were killed in Burkina Faso when unknown attackers attacked their refugee convoy separating them from the women and children and executing them.
- October 13 – 25 people including 13 soldiers when Jihadists attacked and burned down a military base in Mali then ambushed the reinforcements sent to the base.
- October 16 – 20 people were killed in a jihadist attack on three villages in Burkina Faso.
- November 12 – 14 soldiers were killed in an ambush along Tinakof-Beldiabe road in Oudalan province, Burkina Faso.
- December 28 – three French soldiers were killed when an IED hit their armored vehicle in Mopti province, Mali.

=== 2021 ===
- January 2 – 2021 Niger attacks: 105 people were killed and 75 injured in Tchombangou and Zaroumdareye villages in Tillabéri Region in Niger in a suspected Islamist attack.
- January 2 – Two French soldiers were killed and another injured when their AFV hit an IED in Menaka, Mali.
- January 3 – Militants held a wedding hostage in Central Mali, but an airstrike was conducted on the wedding killing 20 people and leaving 27 missing.
- January 5 – Six people were killed after 100 gunmen attacked the town of Loumbila, Burkina Faso. The insurgents stole food and motorbikes and burned several buildings.
- January 13 – Four Ivorian soldiers were killed and five others wounded by an ambush conducted by armed militants.
- January 24 – January 2022 Burkina Faso coup d'état
- February 3 – Nine Malian troops were killed and six wounded in an ambush near the village of Boni in Mali.
- March 16 – 2021 Niger attacks: 58 people were killed in Niger when armed militants attacked four vehicles carrying people that had just visited a local market at two nearby villages.
- March 21 – ISIL militants attacked a Malian army post killing at least 33 Malian soldiers.
- March 21 – 2021 Tahoua attacks: 141 people were killed by gunmen in Niger after series of attacks near the border with Mali. This has been called Niger's deadliest jihadist massacre.
- April 3 – ISIL militants attacked a Niger army camp close to the border with Nigeria. 5 Nigerien soldiers were killed and many more were wounded. Six soldiers were also killed when an IED was activated against Nigerien reinforcements that arrived after the exchange of gunfire.
- April 15 – Two Chadian soldiers were killed after being targeted by gunfire near the Mali-Niger border.
- April 26 – Two Spanish documentary journalists and an Irish wildlife conservationist were killed following an ambush by Nusrat al-Islam on their convoy in eastern Burkina Faso, near the Benin border. The three Europeans, David Beriáin, Roberto Fraile and Rory Young, were initially reported missing together with a member of the Burkinabe armed forces following the attack. They were killed while filming a documentary about poaching in Pama, Burkina Faso.
- April 27 – ISIL claimed an ambush on a group of Malian soldiers in the Ansongo region. At least 3 Malian soldiers were killed in the attack.
- May 1 – A Jihadist ambush on a military patrol in the Tahoua region left 16 Nigerien soldiers dead, six injured, and one missing.
- May 3 – Kodyel attack: jihadists attacked the village of Kodyel, Burkina Faso, killing 30 and injuring 20.
- May 4 – ISIL claim responsibility for an ambush on the Malian Azawad Liberation Movement militia, leaving 18 of the militiamen dead.
- May 22 – 2021 Niger attacks: ISIL attacked a Nigerien police headquarters on the Chetimari-Maine-Soroa road, about 40 km west of Diffa, near the Nigeria-Niger border, killing a policeman.
- June 4–5 – Solhan and Tadaryat massacres
- June 8 – ISIL released photos of them executing 5 Christians somewhere on the Mali-Niger border. In the same release, they also showed a photo of them executing an alleged spy.
- June 22 – Unknown assailants ambushed a police convoy en route to Yirgou in northern Burkina Faso, killing at least 11 police officers and leaving four others missing.
- June 25 – A car bomb injured 13 UN peacekeepers stationed in a temporary base near the village of Ichagara in the Gao Region of Mali. At least six Malian soldiers were killed in a separate attack in the nearby Mopti Region.
- July 12 – Ten people were killed in northern Burkina Faso, 7 of them members of a civilian defense force, and the other 3 were civilians. It is suspected that jihadists carried out the attack.
- August 6 – 30 people, including 15 soldiers, were killed in several suspected jihadist attacks in northern Burkina Faso.
- August 9 – More than 40 civilians were killed by jihadists in separate attacks in the villages of Karou, Ouatagouna and Daoutegeft in northern Mali. On the same day, 15 civilians were killed during a jihadist attack in Banibangou region. 33 civilians were killed in the same area two weeks prior.
- August 12 – 17 Jihadists and 5 defense volunteers were killed in an attack in Bilakoka, northern Burkina Faso.
- September 24 – A French soldier was killed in an armed clash with insurgents in Mali, close to the Burkina Faso border. The gunman was also killed.
- October 7 – 16 Malian soldiers were killed in a Jihadist attack in central Mali.
- October 13 – A French soldier was killed following an accident that occurred during a maintenance operation in Timbuktu.
- October 20 – British soldiers killed two suspected ISIS fighters after they came under fire whilst conducting a UN Peacekeeping mission on the road between Indelimone and Ménaka.
- November 27 – Three Burkina Faso soldiers were killed in a Jihadist attack near the southern Ivorian border.
- November 5 – 2021 Adab-Dab attack: At least 69 people, including the town mayor, were killed in a Jihadist attack on the village of Adab-dab in western Niger. Local sources say that members of the ISGS launched the attack on Nigerien defence forces in the area.
- November 15 – 32 people, including 28 military police officers and 4 civilians were killed in an armed attack on a gendarmerie post in north Burkina Faso.

=== 2022 ===
- January 22 – A French Brigadier was killed in a mortar attack on the Barkhane military camp in Gao, northern Mali.
- June 11* – Seytenga massacre: Militants from the Islamic State – Sahel Province attacked the town of Seytenga, Séno Province, Burkina Faso, killing over a hundred civilians in a massacre.
- September 5 – Silgadji bus bombing: At least 35 civilians were killed and 37 wounded following a suspected jihadist attack when a vehicle in the escorted supply convoy, heading to Ouagadougou, hit an improvised explosive device (IED) on the main road, between the northern towns of Djibo and Bourzanga, in the north of Burkina Faso.
- September 26 – Eleven soldiers were killed and 50 civilians are missing following a suspected jihadist ambush in the northern town of Djibo in the Gaskinde area of Soum Province of Burkina Faso. The attack also left 28 wounded, including 20 soldiers, 1 Volunteer for the Defense of the Homeland (VDP) and 7 civilians.

=== 2023 ===
- January 29 – Fifteen men were found dead in Cascades Region after armed men stopped two transport vehicles carrying 24 people.
- January 30 – Fourteen people were killed, including 10 soldiers, two volunteer fighters and a civilian, in an attack on a unit in Falagountou.
- February 1 – At least 15 Nigerian pilgrims were killed in Burkina Faso on their way to Senegal after their bus convoy was attacked by gunmen.
- February 7 – A checkpoint in Nara, Mali was attacked by suspected jihadists, leaving two police officers and a gendarme dead.
- February 11 – An ambush in the Tillabéri region of Niger kills 10 soldiers and leaves 29 more missing or wounded.
- February 17 – An ambush by the Islamic State against a Burkinabe army convoy in the Oudalan region of Burkina Faso leaves 54-plus soldiers dead, dozens of others wounded, and 5 others captured.
- March 5 – Nouakchott prison break: Four AQMI members escaped from the Nouakchott civil prison, killing guards and leading to a state of emergency in the surrounding area.
- April 6–7 – Kourakou and Tondobi attacks: Twin attacks in the villages of Kourakou and Tondobi, Burkina Faso kill 44 people.
- April 16 – Six Burkinabe soldiers and 34 members of a volunteer defense group were killed and an additional 33 were wounded after an attack in the village of Aorema, located in the Nord region of Burkina Faso.
- April 22 – A bomb attack near a military camp in Sévare, Mali killed 10 people and injured 61 others.
- April 28 – 33 soldiers were killed and 12 more were wounded from an attack on a military base in eastern Burkina Faso.
- May 11 – 33 vegetable farmers were killed by gunmen in Boucle du Mouhoun Region, Burkina Faso.
- June 2 – Two people were killed after jihadists attacked a food convoy in the Loroum province. Two military units that were escorting the convoy attacked back, killing at least 50 jihadists.
- June 5 – Suspected jihadists kill 21 people in Sawenga, Burkina Faso. At least 14 of the dead were members of the VDP.
- June 9 – One U.N. Peacekeeper was killed and another 8 were injured after they were attacked by an IED and then fired at in Mali's Tombouctou region.
- June 27 – A supply convoy that was escorted by military personnel was ambushed by suspected jihadists while returning from Djibo. At least 34 soldiers were killed.
- June 30 – UN peacekeeping mission MINUSMA disbands as requested from the Foreign Minister of Mali, with all UN forces due to leave Mali by December 31.
- July 5 – 15 civilians were killed by suspected jihadists in the province of Gnagna in Burkina Faso.
- July 15 – A police officer and four civilians are killed in a suspected jihadist attack in Tillabéri Region, Niger.
- July 26–28 – A coup d'état occurred in Niger when Mohamed Bazoum was detained by the country's presidential guard and Abdourahamane Tiani proclaimed himself the leader of a military junta. This led to the start of the 2023 Nigerien crisis.
- August 3 – 16 Malian soldiers were killed in a jihadist attack in the Ménaka region near Niger. The Islamic State claimed responsibility for the attack.
- August 7 – Around 20 people were killed and over a dozen were injured in a suspected jihadist attack in the Centre-Est region in Burkina Faso.
- August 10 – ECOWAS orders the activation and deployment of a regional standby force to restore constitutional order in Niger.
- August 13 – Armed jihadists killed 6 Malian soldiers in northern Mali.
- August 16 – 17 Nigerien soldiers were killed and 20 more were injured in an ambush by suspected jihadists near the town of Koutougou.
- August 18 – 23 people were killed by gunmen and 12 more were wounded in the village of Yarou in central Mali.
- August 20 – 12 Nigerien soldiers were killed in a suspected jihadist ambush in the Tillabéri Region.
- September 2 – Four members of the VDP and a policeman were killed by jihadists in Silmiougou, Burkina Faso.
- September 5 – 2023 Yatenga Province clashes: 53 Burkina Faso soldiers were killed repelling a jihadist attack in the town of Koumbri.
- September 7 – September 2023 Mali attacks: 64 people, including 49 civilians and 15 soldiers, were killed in a 'complex' jihadist attack at a Malian military base in Gao.
- September 12 – At least 10 Malian soldiers were killed and 13 were wounded in an attack by a rebel group in northern Mali.
- September 14 – 8 people were killed, 10 were injured, and several more were missing after jihadists attacked a camp in Wendou, Burkina Faso.
- September 22 – Five people were killed and multiple others were injured after a mortar attack in Timbuktu.
- September 28 – 2023 Burkina Faso coup d'état attempt: Burkina Faso's military junta claimed that the country's intelligence and security services have foiled a coup attempt. Four people have been arrested and two others are on the run for their alleged involvement.
- September 29 – 12 Nigerien soldiers were killed; 7 during combat and 5 after a road accident while attempting to respond to the attack, and another 7 were injured in an attack in southwestern Niger. Hundreds of jihadists participated in the attack, which took place in the town of Kandadji. Niger's defense minister claimed that over 100 jihadists were killed in a counteroffensive.
- September 30 – The Permanent Strategic Framework, a coalition of mainly Tuareg separatist groups, claimed to have killed 81 Malian soldiers in the center of the country. They also claimed to have wounded dozens more, taken five as prisoners, while losing seven of their own fighters. The claims have not been confirmed.
- October 2 – 2023 Tabatol attack: At least 29 Nigerien soldiers were killed after being attacked by jihadists in western Niger, near the Malian border. Over 100 militants participated in the attack, who used IEDs and "kamikaze vehicles". Two more soldiers were left seriously wounded and several dozen jihadists were killed.
- October 5 – France begun its withdrawal of military personnel from Niger, and stated that all French military units in the country will return to France by the end of the year.
- October 15 – Six Nigerien soldiers were killed and 18 were injured in a clash between Niger's armed forces and "terrorist elements" in the town of Téra. 31 terrorists were also killed.
- October 27 – A MINUSMA convoy was attacked while withdrawing peacekeepers from Mali, resulting in four truck drivers being wounded.
- November 1 – A UN convoy was attacked by an IED after leaving its camp in Kidal, Mali, injuring eight peacekeepers.
- November 3 – Seven UN peacekeepers were injured after a convoy was hit by IEDs.
- November 4 – 22 UN peacekeepers were injured after their convoy encountered two IEDs.
- November 5 – At least 70 people were killed in the Burkinabè village of Zaongo by unknown assailants.
- November 7:
  - At leas14 people, including children, the deputy mayor and a local councillor, were killed after a series of strikes on the town of Kidal perpetrated by the Malian Armed Forces.
  - About 40 Dogon people were kidnapped after ambushes on several public transport buses traveling between Koro and Bankass by suspected Islamic extremists. The women were later released. About 30 men remain hostage.
  - Unidentified gunmen killed a journalist and kidnapped two others on the Gao–Asongo road.
- November 18 – Fifteen people, including three army auxiliaries, were killed in simultaneous attacks in Diapaga, Burkina Faso.
- November 26 – Battle of Djibo: JNIM fighters carried out a "major" attack on a military base, targeting an army detachment in Djibo. Burkina Faso claimed that they inflicted "heavy losses" on the attackers, while some soldiers were killed. They also attacked homes and camps in the city, killing at least 40 civilians and injuring 42. The Burkina Faso Information Agency stated that the attacks were an attempt to seize Djibo, in which 3,000 criminals participated in. They added that around 400 of them were "destroyed" during a counter-offensive by the country's Armed Forces.
- November 28 – Mali announced that they started several investigations against leaders of various ethnic separatist and jihadist groups for terrorism and money laundering. Among those under investigation are Iyag Ag Ghaly, and six other leaders of Tuareg rebel groups.
- December 1 – Daouda Diallo, a human rights defender in Burkina Faso, was abducted by unknown individuals in the country's capital. The abductors were dressed in civilian clothing, and captured Diallo as he tried to enter his car.
- December 3 – The Malian army claimed that it repelled jihadist attacks against four localities in northern Mali.
- December 12:
  - Around 30 soldiers and five civilians were killed in twin attacks in Mali's Ségou Region. Militants stormed the village of Farabougou and attacked a nearby military camp. Some residents in Farabougou were kidnapped, and the camp was burned down by the attackers.
  - Three people were killed and another was injured from an IED explosion in Bankass, Mali.
- December 13 – JNIM leader Iyad Ag Ghaly published a video warning about a "new phase of Jihad" and urged local residents to fight against the juntas of Mali, Burkina Faso, Niger and the Wagner Group.
- December 24:
  - GSIM fighters launched an attack on the Solle detachment, killing around 60 Burkinabé soldiers. The soldiers were able to repel the attacks.
  - A gendarmerie base in Gorgadji was attacked by several terrorists on motorbikes.
- December 29 – A Nigerien soldier was killed and an additional five were wounded when their vehicle drove over a land mine in Ouro Gueladjo.
- December 30 – Several civilians and soldiers were killed during an attack on a military base in Nouna.
- December 31 – Niger's defense ministry announced that 11 people were killed in weekend attacks on the villages of Amara and Loudji.

=== 2024 ===
- January 5 – An unknown number of civilians were killed while Niger's army conducted airstrikes against terrorists as they attempted to attack a military post in Tyawa.
- January 28 – 22 people were killed during a suspected jihadist attack on Motogatta, Niger.
- February 25:
  - Islamic State militants killed 15 people and injured two others in a Catholic church in Essakane village, Burkina Faso.
  - Several dozen people were killed, including an important religious figure, when armed individuals (most likely affiliated with JNIM) attacked a mosque in Natiaboani, Burkina Faso. Soldiers and members of the VDP were also targeted by the attackers.
  - Nondin and Soro massacres: Members of the Burkina Faso Armed Forces killed 223 civilians in Nondin and Soro.
- March 22 – 2024 Tillabéri attack: A Nigerien military unit was attacked by over 100 militants between Teguey and Bankilare in the Tillabéri Region. 23 soldiers were killed and 17 more were wounded, while at least 30 attackers were killed.
- March 31 – Tawori attack: JNIM militants attacked a Burkinabe army detachment in Tawori, killing 73 including 32 civilians.
- April 30 – Malian authorities announced the killing of senior Islamic State commander Abu Huzeifa, who was linked to the Tongo Tongo ambush.
- May 1 – A suspected JNIM improvised explosive device bombing near Arbinda, Burkina Faso killed one civilian and injured four others.
- May 19 – The chief of Barhiaga, Burkina Faso, was killed by JNIM fighters who accused him of collaborating with the Burkina Faso Armed Forces.
- May 22 – Hundreds of JNIM militants attacked a VDP base and internally displaced persons' camp that housed around 3,500 people in Gougré, Burkina Faso, killing eight VDP fighters and 72 civilians and injuring 40 others.
- June 11:
  - JNIM claimed responsibility for an attack on a military post in Mansila that they said killed 107 Burkinabe soldiers.
  - At least 20 civilians were killed and many were displaced after suspected JNIM militants attacked Sindo, Burkina Faso. They also looted shops and stole livestock.
- June 18 – JNIM fighters with tree branches attacked five women returning to Sindo.
- June 30 – Suspected JNIM militants killed at least two civilians in the Niamana in Hauts-Bassins Region, Burkina Faso after previously attacking civilians and armed personnel in the village.
- July 27 – JNIM claimed that it ambushed soldiers and Wagner Group mercenaries fleeing the Battle of Tinzaouaten, killing ten Malians and 50 Russians.
- August 24 – 2024 Barsalogho attack: JNIM militants killed at least 400 people during an attack against soldiers and civilians digging trenches in Barsalogho, Burkina Faso.
- August 25 – Militants killed at least 26 people in an attack on a church in Nouna, Burkina Faso.
- September 17 – 2024 Bamako attacks: JNIM conducted a major attack against Malian military sites in Bamako, claiming that it killed and injured hundreds of soldiers. Malian TV acknowledged "some" deaths.
- September 18 – Niger announced that 12 soldiers were killed and 30 others were injured in several attacks throughout the week.
- November 21 – At least six Wagner Group fighters were killed in an ambush on a convoy in the Mopti Region claimed by JNIM.
- December 12 – 10 Nigerien soldiers are killed in western Niger, near the border with Burkina Faso.
- December 14 – At least thirty-nine villagers were killed in two massacres in villages near the border with Burkina Faso.
- December 20 – Suspected jihadist attacks on six villages in the Bandiagara region of central Mali killed at least 20 people.
- December 26 – The force of the Alliance of Sahel States (AES) kills Moussa Himma Diallo, number 2 of the Katiba Serma, "a formidable terrorist" in the Serma sector, Douentza region, in central Mali.
- December 28 – 21 terrorists were killed by the Malian army, 1 Malian soldier was killed, 3 other soldiers were injured and 2 civilians were also injured.

=== 2025 ===
- January 2 – Five Burkina Faso soldiers were killed in an attack in the Gnangdin area, near the border with Togo and Ghana.
- January 6 – At least 30 terrorist militants are killed, and one soldier injured, in the Mobti region of Mali.
- January 9 – 28 Beninese soldiers were killed in a jihadist attack on an army position near the Benin-Niger border.
- February 7 – A jihadist attack targeted a convoy of 19 vehicles carrying mostly miners and traders near Kobe, Mali, killing 34 civilians and injuring 34 others. An unknown number of Malian soldiers were also killed, and the Malian army announced that it recovered 19 bodies belonging to the attackers.
- February 12 – JNIM killed two in an armed assault in Yatenga Province of Burkina Faso.
- February 14 – Katiba Macina, a jihadist group with links to al-Qaeda, reportedly conducted a rocket attack on the convoy of Malian Minister of Higher Education Bourema Kansaye in Niéna. An ensuing shootout injured four police officers.
- March 2 – Nine gunmen and a Beninese soldier were killed in clashes in the commune of Karimama, northern Benin.
- March 2 – 11 Nigerien soldiers were killed in a jihadist ambush close to the border with Algeria.
- March 10–11 – The Human Rights Watch reported that Burkinabe government and allied forces massacred at least 58 Fulani civilians, including two children, in Solenzo, apparently in response to their alleged support for Islamist militants. The HRW later increased the death toll to over 130.
- March 14 – Hundreds of militants attacked a police station in Yamba, eastern Burkina Faso, killing up to 16 police officers and volunteers and injuring several others.
- March 15 – Several civilians were killed in an attack in Foutouri.
- March 21 – Gunmen killed 44 people and injured 13 others in a mosque in Kokorou. The Nigerien defense ministry accused ISGS of carrying out the attack.
- March 29 – A suspected jihadist attack on an army detachment from Diapaga killed dozens of Burkinabe soldiers and civilian auxiliaries and wounded at least 30 others.
- April 1 – JNIM killed at least 13 civilians in Lanfiéra after abducting men from their homes.
- April 5 – Hundreds of JNIM fighters launched a coordinated attack on the Burkinabe villages of Gonon, Mara, and Tiao, gathering men into one location before shooting them. At least 100 people were killed.
- April 17 – At least 54 Beninese soldiers stationed in W National Park were killed in an attack claimed by JNIM, marking the deadliest such incident since jihadists began operating in northern Benin.
- April 25 – A Nigerien military unit was ambushed by militants north of Sakoira, resulting in the death of twelve soldiers. Two attackers were arrested.
- April 26 – 19 people were killed after gunmen raided a gold mine in the state of Zamfara, Nigeria.
- April 30 – 15 Nigerian civilians were killed after ISWAP militants stormed Kwaple village, near the town of Chibok, Nigera.
- May 4 – 11 Nigerian soldiers were killed after ISWAP raided a military base in the town of Buni Gari, Yobe state, Nigeria.
- May 11 – Hundreds of JNIM fighters attacked an army base, police station, and market in Djibo, killing dozens of soldiers and civilians. JNIM later claimed that it killed 200 soldiers.
- May 12:
  - JNIM launched an attack on Diapaga, attacking a military post, destroying monuments, setting fires to businesses, and freeing inmates from a prison.
  - Suspected JNIM fighters attacked a Chinese-owned shop in Narena, kidnapping two Chinese citizens. They later attacked a nearby artisanal gold panning site, killing a Malian and two Ghanaians.
- May 13 – JNIM claimed responsibility for an attack on a Burkinabe army post in Sole, Loroum Province, that it said killed 60 soldiers. SITE Intelligence Group also reported that ten VDP fighters were killed in an undated attack in Gnagna Province.
- May 14 – Four Nigerian soldiers were killed in an ISWAP raid on a Nigerian military base in northeastern Nigeria.
- May 17 – The Malian Army was accused of carrying out a massacre after at least 20 civilians were shot dead in a mass execution in the village of Mamba near Diafarabe.
- May 24 – at least 29 people were killed after a group of armed 'bandits' attacked two villages in Northeastern Nigeria.
- June 1 – JNIM attacked a military base housing 280 soldiers in Boulkessi, Mali, killing at least 60 and injuring 40 others. A military source stated that all of the survivors were captured.
- June 2 – JNIM claimed that it attacked Wagner mercenaries and a military airport in Timbuktu. The Malian army claimed that it repelled the attack, killing 14 militants and arresting 31.
- 2 June – At least 20 civilians were killed in a Nigerian airstrike in Zamfara state, northwestern Nigeria.
- June 5 – At least 50 gunmen on motorcycles attacked a military post in Mahou, Mali, killing five people and injured around ten others.
- June 6 – The Wagner Group announced that it would withdraw from Mali, claiming that it completed its mission in the country and killed thousands of militants.
- June 8 – JNIM launched an attack on Kpékankandi, Togo near the Burkina Faso Border. The attack was repelled by the military, killing six and taking three prisoners.
- June 11 – Local authorities reported that at least 20 civilians were killed in armed attacks in the Mangu local government area, north-central Nigeria over the past week.
- June 12 – JNIM attacked and took control a military position in Basso village, Borgou Department, Benin, near the border of Nigeria.
- June 13 – Nine people were killed in a jihadist attack on a road linking Makalondi and Torodi near the border with Burkina Faso.
- June 14 – At least 45 people were killed in a raid by armed gunmen in raid on Yelewata town, Benue state, Nigeria.
- June 19 – June 2025 Banibangou attack: 34 Nigerien soldiers were killed in an attack by several hundred IS-SP militants in Bani-Bangou, Niger.
- June 20–21 – 71 civilians were massacred and 20 more were injured during a Friday prayer gathering in Manda, Talliberi, Niger by IS-SP militants.
- June 24–25 Mutinies occurred within the Nigerien Army occurred in Filingué and Téra and refused to partake in a combat mission, demanding better resources and intelligence. The commander of the company in Filingué, Lieutenant Colonel Massaoudou Dari Mossi, was beaten by his men after opposing the mutiny, being transported to Turkey for hospitalization.
- June 26 – At least 20 Nigerian soldiers were killed in an armed raid by bandits on a base outside the town of Bangi in Mariga district, central Nigeria.
- July 1 – JNIM fighters conducted coordinated attacks on several Malian military posts near the borders of Senegal and Mauritania, with the group claiming that it seized three barracks and dozens of army positions. According to the Malian army, 80 insurgents were killed. During the attacks, three Indian nationals were abducted from a cement factory in Kayes.
- July 4:
  - 11 people were killed in an ISWAP attack in the town of Malam Fatori on the border with Niger and another 17 killed in a separate Lakurawa jihadist attack in Kwallajiya village, Sokoto, Nigeria.
  - Hundreds of militants attacked Nigerien soldiers in Bouloundjounga and Samira, western Niger, killing ten and wounding 15. Forty-one attackers were killed during the fighting, according to Defense Minister Salifou Modi.
- July 15 – Two Indian nationals were killed and a third was abducted during a terrorist attack in Dosso Region, Niger.
- July 29 – At least 50 soldiers were killed in a suspected JNIM attack on the Dargo military base in northern Burkina Faso.
- August 1 – At least three Russian Africa Corps mercenaries were killed in a JNIM ambush on their convoy near Ténenkou, in their first known casualties since their deployment to Mali.
- August 19 – Two Malian military outposts, located in Farabougou and Biriki-Were, were attacked. JNIM took responsibility, claiming it killed 21 soldiers, captured two, and seized military equipment.
- August 24 – JNIM members crossed the border from Burkina Faso into the Ivory Coast and entered the village of Difita in search of VDP soldiers. They proceeded to burn 20 houses, kill four people, injure one, and kidnap another. Later reports from Ivorian media stated that VDP militiamen kidnapped six DAARA agents (Direction d'aide et d'assistance aux réfugiés et apatrides) who were conducting censuses of displaced people.
- September 8 – JNIM imposed a nationwide blockade on fuel and other goods imported from neighboring countries while besieging Malian government-held cities and towns. An unknown number of fuel trucks from Senegal and the Ivory Coast violating JNIM's blockade have been attacked and burned by militants.
- September 11 – At least 27 Nigerien soldiers were killed by IS-SP militants in two attacks on the outskirts of Tillaberi. The first attack was an ambush on five pick up trucks carrying National Guard soldiers and killed 15, while the second attack was on an army position next to the airport, killing 12 and burning down a refugee camp.
- September 15 – Gunmen killed 22 people in the Tillabéri Region, including 15 who were at a baptism ceremony in Takoubatt.
- October 4 – JNIM militants take control of a military outpost in Ouara, Benin, killing three soldiers.
- October 28 - JNIM claimed responsibility for an attack that killed a soldier in Nigeria near the Benin border in its first attack in the country.

=== 2026 ===
- 4 January - Eight Nigerian soldiers were killed by an ISWAP IED detonation targeting their vehicle near Damasak, Borno State. On the same day, 30 people were killed after armed men attacked the village of Kasuwan-Daji, Niger state.
- 6 January – A Nigerien drone strike at a market in Kokoloko, Tillabéri Region, killed 17 civilians, including four children, and injured 13 others. Three Islamic State fighters were also killed.
- 14 January - At least six people, including three soldiers, were killed in clashes between the Chadian army and MPRD rebel forces in the Moyen-Chari region of Chad.
- 21 January - 11 Burkina Faso police officers were killed in jihadist attacks in the eastern part of the country.
- 3 February - At least 162 people were killed after suspected armed jihadists attacked villages of Woro and Nuku in the Kwara state, western Nigeria. Another 13 people were also killed in a separate attack in the village of Doma in the northwestern state of Katsina.
- 9 February - at least 30 people were killed in two attacks by armed militants on two neighboring towns in Nigeria's central state of Benue.
- 14 February - 46 people were killed in armed attacks on three villages the Borgu local government area in Niger State, Nigeria.
- 24 February - At least 30 people were killed in Jihadist attacks on Madagali and Hong in the border region of Adamawa state, Nigeria.
- 27 February - 25 Nigerien militiamen were killed in a suspected Islamic State ambush near Tillaberi, western Niger.
- 30-31 March - 27 civilians had their throats slit by ISWAP miliants in a mass execution in a forest outside the town of Mafa, northeastern Nigeria. The before, 11 people were killed in a separate ISWAP raid on Kautikeri village outside the town of Chibok.
- 7 April-35 JNIM fighters were killed in an attack by IS in Western Niger in the Tera region. On the same day, at least 50 people were killed in a jihadist raid on the village of Erena in the Shiroro, Niger state.
- 11 April - 21 civilians were killed after armed bandits attacked a village in northern Nigeria’s Zamfara state.
- 12 April- At least 100 civilians were killed after a Nigerian Air Force fighter jet hit a market in a village in Yobe state, northern Nigeria. The jet was pursuing jihadist fighters in the area.
- 30 April- A joint Beninese and Nigerian militia killed 41 Fulani herders in a raid in Niger State, the militia went door to door, arresting people they believe were Ansaru and shooting those who resisted.
- 21 May - Boko Haram fighters killed 33 fisherman and loggers in an attack on Malam Maja village in nearby Dikwa district.
- 13 June - Gunmen killed at least 17 farmers in an attack on Goron Namaye village in Maradun district of Zamfara state.
- 18 June - The Nigerien government announced that 11 soldiers and 2 civilians were killed in a jihadist attack on Diori Hamani international airport near Niamey.
- 30 June - A Malian airstrike killed 8 civilians in a strike near Inkadewane on the border with Niger.
- 2 July - 15 people were killed in an attack by gunmen in Nigeria’s Benue state.
- 8 July - 22 soldiers were killed in a suspected jihadist attack on a military base in Di, near Dedougou, Burkina Faso.
- 12 July - The Malian government announced that at least 30 Malian soldiers had been killed in the past week of fighting with rebels during an operation to retake the northern town of Anefis.
- 29 August - 2026 Nigerien coup attempt: Mutinous soldiers of the Nigerien Armed Forces attempt to overthrow the government of Abdourahamane Tiani.

== Effects ==
As a result of the insurgency, the affected countries have been severely destabilized, with the emergence of the coup belt following several coup d'états within the region due to perceived inability to handle the conflict. In Mali and Burkina Faso, both countries lost significant control of their territory to the Islamists. The conflict has also seen a political shift in the region, with many military juntas, many having recently overthrown US- and Chinese-backed governments, allying themselves with the Russian government and the Wagner Group.

In particular, Mali has seen significant activity of the Wagner Group as the government moved closer to Turkey and Russia. Niger saw its government being overthrown in 2023 due to poor management of the conflict. In particular, the M62 Movement, a pro-Russian group, supported the coup. Burkina Faso also saw its government being overthrown twice within a year, with coups occurring in January and September, both of which caused by poor management of the conflict against Islamists. As a result of Russian expansion, Ukraine began to support militia groups such as the Azawad Liberation Front.

Although not affected as much, countries nearby like Ghana, Benin, Guinea, Togo and the Ivory Coast have been under constant threat of either full-on insurgency or severe destabilization internally. Guinea has already seen a coup d'état while the Gambia has seen turmoil internally. Northern Benin has seen an increase in terrorism attributed to Jama'at Nusrat al-Islam wal-Muslimin and the Islamic State, with 28 incidents attributed to the groups between 1 November 2021 and 14 September 2022, including the W National Park massacre. Ivory Coast reported that it hosted 90,000 refugees from Burkina Faso and an influx of Malian refugees in 2025.

== See also ==
- Allied Democratic Forces insurgency
- Boko Haram insurgency
- JNIM-ISGS war
- Insurgency in Cabo Delgado
- Insurgency in the Maghreb (2002–present)
- Sinai insurgency
