= Salmossi mosque attack =

Terrorist attack in Burkina Faso

- Part of the Islamist insurgency in Burkina Faso and the War in the Sahel
- Location: Salmossi, Oudalan Province, Burkina Faso
- Date: 11 October 2019
- Target: Worshippers
- Attack type: Mass shooting
- Deaths: 16
- Injuries: 2

The Salmossi mosque attack occurred on the evening of Friday, 11 October 2019 in a mosque in Oudalan Province, Burkina Faso which left 16 people dead and two injured. It happened while the residents were praying inside the Grand Mosque in Salmossi, a village close to the border with Mali. AFP reported that 13 people died on the spot while 3 died later due to the injuries.

== Background ==
In the aftermath of the 2011 Libyan Civil War, militant attacks have increased due to a large influx of weapons and fighters into the region. Neighbouring Mali faced conflict in Azawad that threatened to split the country.

Burkina Faso also faced an uprising in 2014 leading to the downfall of President Blaise Compaoré later that year. Burkina Faso is a member of the Trans-Saharan Counterterrorism Partnership and its commitment of peacekeeping troops in Mali and Sudan has made it a target for extremists in the region. Until 2015, Burkina Faso had remained violence free despite violent events occurring in the northern neighbouring countries of Mali and Niger. Since then, jihadist groups linked to Al-Qaeda and the Islamic State began their infiltration into the country from the northern borders followed by its eastern borders. The infiltration have also brought danger to the southern and western borders. Since 2015, Burkina Faso has faced cross-border attacks and sporadic raids in its territory, the result of instability and unrest in neighboring countries.

Several major attacks have occurred in the capital Ouagadougou in recent years: In 2016, attacks on a hotel and restaurant killed 30 people, including foreigners; and in 2017, similar attacks killed 19 people, including foreigners. Both of these attacks were carried out by Al-Qaeda in the Islamic Maghreb. On 2 March 2018, at least eight heavily armed militants launched an assault on key locations throughout Ouagadougou, the capital city of Burkina Faso. Targets included the French embassy and the headquarters of Burkina Faso's military. 16 people, including the eight attackers died in the incident that left 85 injured.

In the year 2019, the ethnic and religious tensions started due to the Islamist insurgency in Burkina Faso. The effect was more prominent in the northern areas of Burkina Faso bordering Mali. AFP reported that the Insurgents have combined hit-and-run tactics of guerrilla warfare along with the road side land mines and suicide bombings. Using these tactics, the insurgents have killed about 600 people. However the toll is estimated to be more than 1,000 by the civil society groups. AFP reported that the violence have displaced around 300,000 people and around 3000 schools were closed. The country's economy is largely rural and effect of violence is increasing on the economy. The violence has been causing disruption in the trade and markets. According to the UN Refugee agency, in the last three months preceding October, over 750,000 people have had to flee Burkina Faso.

== Attack ==
The attack occurred on the evening of Friday, 11 October 2019 on a mosque in northern Burkina Faso. It left 16 people dead and two injured. It happened while the residents were praying inside the Grand Mosque in Salmossi, a village close to the border with Mali. AFP reported that 13 people died on the spot while 3 died later due to the injuries.

== Perpetrators ==
No group has claimed the responsibility for the attack.

== Aftermath ==
Residents of the Salmossi village fled from their homes after the attack.

Even though the region is experiencing jihadist violence, many residents of Burkina Faso oppose the stationing of foreign troops in the country. France was the colonial ruler of the region and faces notable opposition of its troops in the country. On Saturday 12 October, AFP reported that crowd consisting of approximately 1000 people led a march in the capital city of Ouagadougou, "to denounce terrorism and the presence of foreign military bases in Africa." According to Gabin Korbeogo, an organiser of the march, foreign military bases were getting installed on the pretext of fighting terrorism. They added that despite the large presence of foreign troops from France, America, Canada, Germany and other countries, the strength of the terrorist groups have increased.

== Reactions ==
United Nations: Secretary-General António Guterres condemned the incident, and expressed deep condolences.
