= Ouagadougou attack =

Ouagadougou attack may refer to:

- 2016 Ouagadougou attacks, 15 January
- 2017 Ouagadougou attack, 13 August
- 2018 Ouagadougou attacks, 2 March
