= Kodyel attack =

Terrorist attack in Burkina Faso

- Part of the Islamist insurgency in Burkina Faso
- Location: 12°48′7″N 1°10′4″E; Kodyel, Foutouri, Burkina Faso
- Date: 3 May 2021
- Attack type: Arson, mass shooting
- Deaths: 30
- Injuries: 20
- Perpetrator: 100+ Islamists
- Motive: Islamic extremism, revenge for aid in battle against insurgency

On 3 May 2021, Islamic militants attacked Kodyel, a village in Foutouri, Burkina Faso. The attack left at least 30 people dead and another 20 injured.

== Background ==
An Islamist insurgency spread throughout the Sahel during the early 21st century. Burkina Faso suffered a lot of unrest during the 2010s. Several major insurgent attacks occurred in the landlocked West African country during the latter part of that decade. Most attacks occur near the country's borders with Mali and Niger. However, major attacks occurred in Ouagadougou in 2016, 2017, and 2018. The insurgency continued into the 2020s, including two fatal attacks on 26 April 2021. In the Est Region, two Spanish journalists and an Irish conservationist were killed and a Burkinabé soldier went missing when their anti-poaching patrol was ambushed. In the Sahel Region, 18 people were killed in the massacre at Yattakou village.

== Attack ==
Over 100 heavily armed militants on motorcycles and pick-up trucks stormed the village of Koydel in Foutori, a department in Burkina Faso located in Komondjari Province near the border with Niger, with a population mainly from the Gurma ethnic group. The attackers initially burned homes and other buildings. Residents exited the buildings after they were set on fire and smoke was increasing; the attackers then opened fire, killing several people at the scene. Survivors then escaped, and the perpetrators opened fire again, killing and wounding many more people. At least 30 civilians were killed and at least 20 more wounded. Children were among the casualties. The village was empty in the immediate aftermath of the attack, as the residents who survived had fled to nearby towns. The attack is one of the deadliest in Burkina Faso's modern history. The assault is suspected to be a revenge as the village recently provided fighters to a volunteer programme which is fighting against the Islamists.

== See also ==
- List of terrorist incidents in 2021
