= W National Park massacre =

Massacre in a Beninese national park

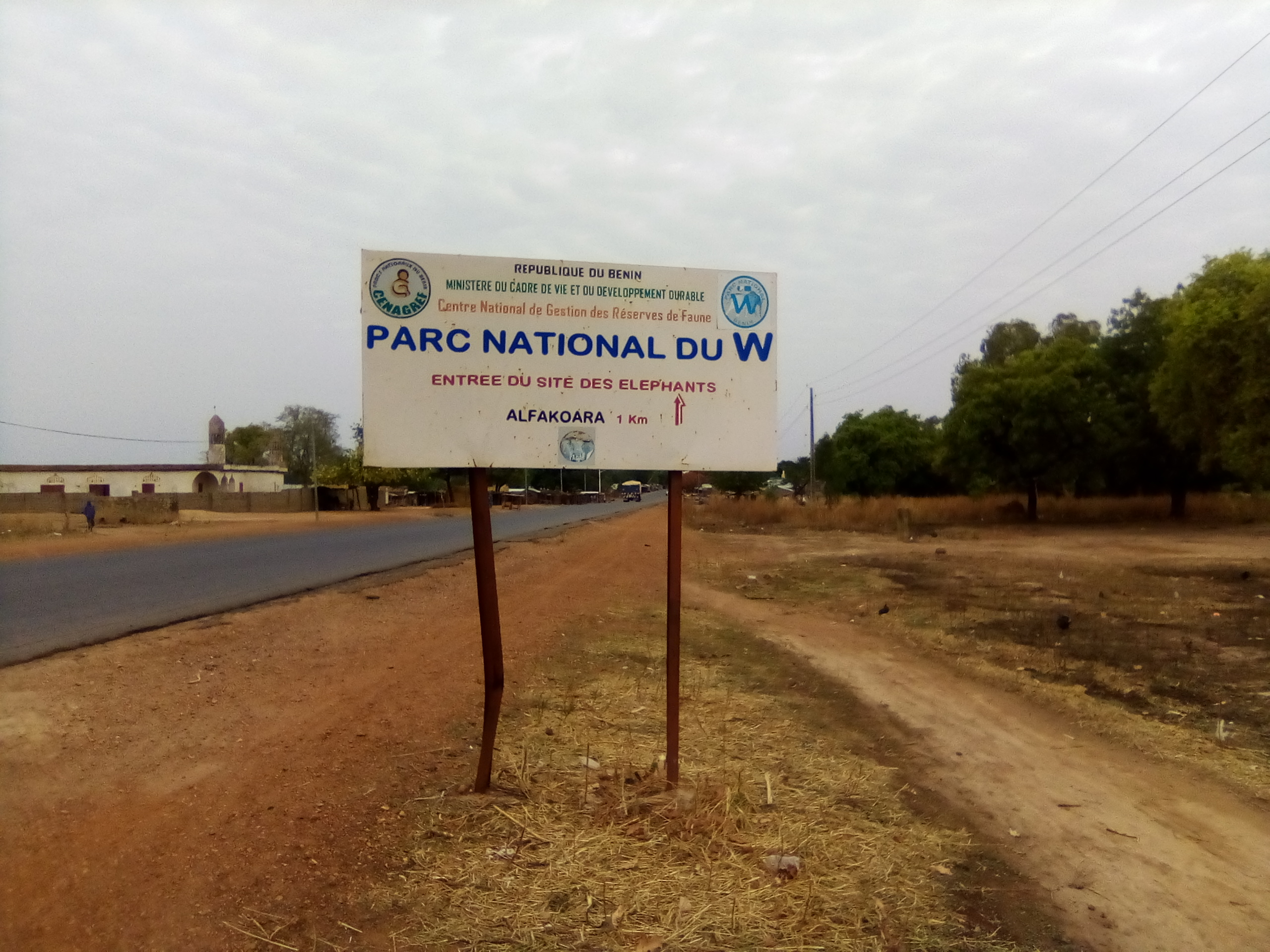
- The park entrance sign in Benin
- Location: 12°2′27.64″N 3°2′3.42″E; W National Park, Benin
- Date: 8 February 2022; 4 years ago (West Africa Time)
- Weapons: Land mines, explosives
- Deaths: 8
- Perpetrator: Jihadists in Burkina Faso (suspected)

On 8 February 2022, two African Parks patrol vehicles in Benin's W National Park were badly damaged by land mines, killing eight people. The incident, believed to have been perpetrated by Islamists, was one of the largest terrorist attacks in the country's history.

== Background ==
Benin is more stable than most other countries in West Africa, and is one of the few nations to not have a major terrorism problem. However, beginning in late 2021, terrorism began to creep in from abroad, especially from the Sahel, which is to the north. In December 2021, the Porga attack occurred when gunmen (probably from Burkina Faso, which has a jihadist insurgency), raided a military outpost near the town of Porga in Atakora Department, killing two soldiers. In January 2022, a military vehicle collided with an improvised explosive device, killing two people.

== Massacre ==
On 8 February 2022 a patrol vehicle in W National Park was scouting for poachers when their vehicles hit two land mines planted by the terrorists. Of the eight people killed in the explosion, five were park rangers, one a park official, another a French law enforcement officer, and the other a soldier. Ten people were injured.

== Aftermath ==
French authorities agreed to launch an investigation after learning that a French citizen was among the dead. African Parks issued a statement that they were working with French and Beninese authorities in response to the massacre. Beninese troops were sent to the park to maintain order. Government authorities also held a meeting to discuss the attack.

On 10 February another roadside bombing killed a civilian and a park ranger. The ranger initially survived the bombing but died after he was attacked by the perpetrators.

On 10 February the French Armed Forces conducted an airstrike on a base held by Jihadist rebels in Southern Burkina Faso. The official motive given was retaliation for the massacre.
