= Barhiaga =

Coordinates: 13°7′42.9″N 0°6′58.3″W

Barhiaga Barhinga
- Interactive map of Barhiaga
- Country: Burkina Faso
- Region: Est Region
- Province: Gnagna Province
- Department: Manni Department

Population (2019)
  - Total: 3,321

Barhiaga is a town in the Manni Department of Gnagna Province in eastern Burkina Faso.

Population
| Year | Pop. | ±% |
|---|---|---|
| 1985 | 868 | — |
| 2006 | 1,311 | +51.0% |
| 2019 | 3,321 | +153.3% |
