= Battle of Koumbri =

2023 battle in Burkina Faso

- Part of Islamist insurgency in Burkina Faso
Date	September 4, 2023
Location	Koumbri, Yatenga Province, Burkina Faso
Result	Indecisive

Belligerents
Burkina Faso: Burkina Faso Armed Forces; 12th Infantry Commando Regiment; Volunteers for the Defense of the Homeland	Jama'at Nasr al-Islam wal Muslimin

Casualties and losses
53 killed ~30 injured	Several dozen killed or injured (per Burkina Faso)

On September 4, 2023, clashes broke out between jihadists from Jama'at Nasr al-Islam wal-Muslimin and Burkinabe soldiers backed by pro-government VDP militiamen in the village of Koumbri, Yatenga Province, Burkina Faso. The battle left over fifty Burkinabe soldiers and militiamen dead and an unknown number of jihadists killed.

== Background ==
Violence by jihadist groups increased exponentially since the September 2022 Burkina Faso coup d'état that overthrew putschist Paul-Henri Sandaogo Damiba, who came to power in a coup that January. Much of the violence was caused by the al-Qaeda-aligned Jama'at Nasr al-Islam wal-Muslimin and its affiliates in Burkina Faso and the Islamic State – Sahil Province, which have besieged towns and launched deadly attacks on Burkinabe soldiers and pro-government militiamen.

The town of Koumbri was captured by jihadists in 2020. On September 2, 2023, the Burkina Faso Armed Forces deployed to the commune of Koumbri with the objective of reestablishing themselves and "enabling the resettlement" of local populations which had fled the town over two years prior. When the soldiers arrived, brief clashes erupted with small pockets of jihadist resistance being crushed by the army. Once reestablished, the soldiers combed through mostly abandoned houses in Koumbri.

== Battle ==
The 12th Infantry Commando Regiment of the Burkinabe army, based in Ouahigouya, was present in Koumbri during the recapture. Militiamen from the Volunteers for the Defense of the Homeland (VDP) also supported the army.

On the morning of September 4, jihadists from JNIM launched an attack on the Burkinabe soldiers in Koumbri. The soldiers were caught between "intense fighting" and "harassing fire." Burkinabe officials stated that the attack was repelled, and that aerial reinforcements helped break the attack. However, Jeune Afrique reported that following the attack, the jihadists remained in Koumbri without being disturbed by remaining Burkinabe soldiers. Jeune Afrique also mentioned there were no airplanes above the town, and that the only reinforcements were ambulances that arrived the next day at 10am to collect the dead and injured.

The attack was claimed on September 6 by JNIM. The Burkinabe army claimed victory, but acknowledged heavy losses. On September 5, Burkinabe officials reported that 17 soldiers and 38 VDP were killed. They also mentioned that around thirty injured were evacuated. The Burkinabe government also stated that several dozen jihadists were killed or injured.
