= MNLA =

MNLA may refer to:

- Malayan National Liberation Army (1949–1960 and 1968–1989), a communist guerrilla force
- Mon National Liberation Army, an insurgent group in Myanmar
- National Movement for the Liberation of Azawad, a political and military organisation in Mali
