= Koumbri Department =

Coordinates: 13°51′N 2°25′W

Koumbri
- Department
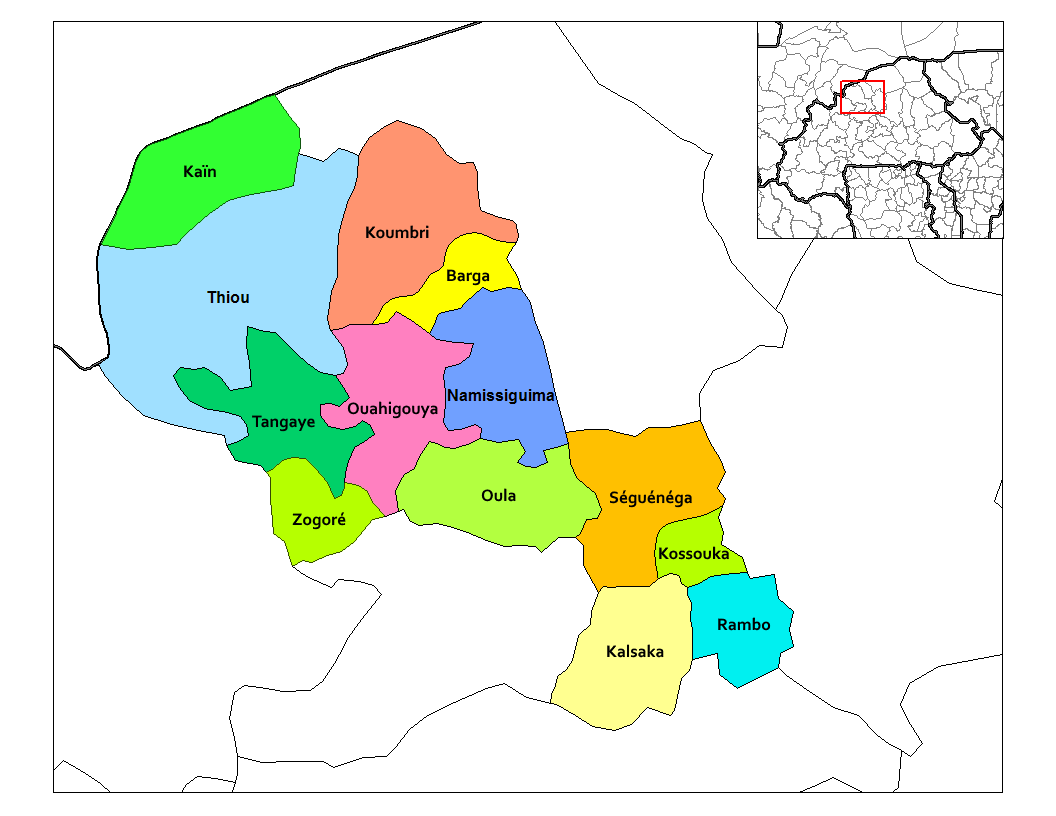
- Koumbri Department location in the province
- Country: Burkina Faso
- Province: Yatenga Province

Area
  - Total: 236.7 sq mi (613.0 km^{2})

Population (2019 census)
  - Total: 61,818
  - Density: 261.2/sq mi (100.8/km^{2})
- Time zone: UTC+0 (GMT 0)

Koumbri is a department or commune of Yatenga Province in northern Burkina Faso. Its capital lies at the town of Koumbri.
