= 2018 Ouagadougou attacks =

Terrorist attack on French Embassy in Burkina Faso

2018 Ouagadougou attack
- Part of the Islamist insurgency in Burkina Faso
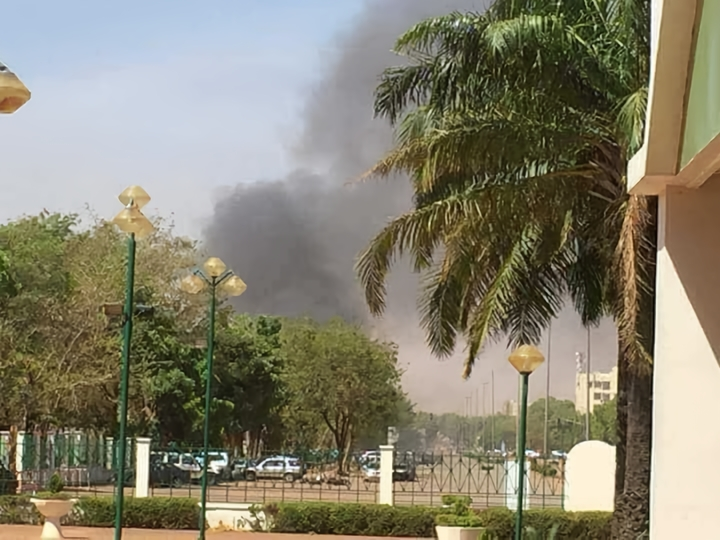
- Smoke rises from the French embassy
- Location: Ouagadougou, Burkina Faso
- Date: 2 March 2018
- Target: French embassy; National army headquarters; French Institute
- Attack type: Shooting, suicide car bombing
- Deaths: 8 (+8 attackers)
- Injuries: 85
- Perpetrators: al-Qaeda in the Islamic Maghreb: Jama'at Nasr al-Islam wal Muslimin

On 2 March 2018, at least eight heavily armed militants launched an assault on key locations throughout Ouagadougou, the capital city of Burkina Faso. Targets included the French embassy and the headquarters of Burkina Faso's military.

== Background ==
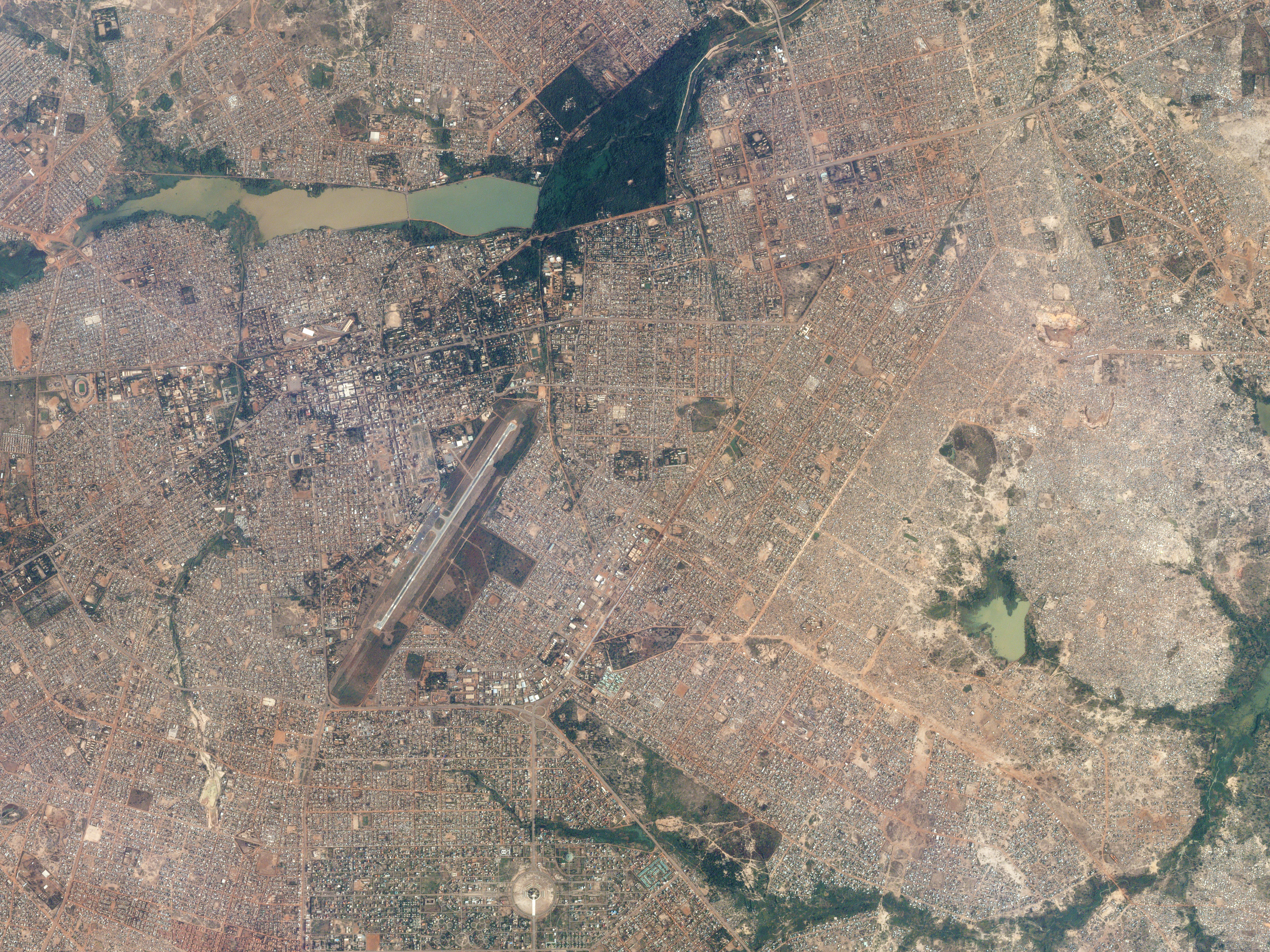
The city of Ouagadougou.

In the aftermath of the 2011 Libyan Civil War, militant attacks have increased due to a large influx of weapons and fighters into the region. Neighbouring Mali faced conflict in Azawad that threatened to split the country. Since 2015, Burkina Faso has faced cross-border attacks and sporadic raids in its territory, the result of instability and unrest in neighboring countries. Two major attacks have occurred in the capital Ouagadougou in recent years: In 2016, attacks on a hotel and restaurant killed 30 people, including foreigners; and in 2017, similar attacks killed 19 people, including foreigners. Both of these attacks were carried out by Al-Qaeda in the Islamic Maghreb.

Burkina Faso also faced an uprising in 2014 leading to the downfall of President Blaise Compaoré later that year. Burkina Faso is a member of the Trans-Saharan Counterterrorism Partnership and its commitment of peacekeeping troops in Mali and Sudan has made it a target for extremists in the region.

== Attacks ==
At around 10:00 a.m., the attackers began their assault on the military headquarters, detonating a car bomb in an apparent attempt at targeting a meeting of senior officers. The blast destroyed one room in the building. Shortly after the assault on the army headquarters, gunmen converged on the French embassy, exchanging fire with local security forces and French special forces soldiers. The French Institute, a cultural organisation located in the city, was targeted as well according to an embassy statement. Local police believes that "Islamic extremists" were behind the attack, which involved the use of gunfire and at least one car bomb. Many of the gunmen were also reportedly wearing army uniforms. Five of the militants were killed at the embassy, and at least three others were killed near the army headquarters, according to Communications Minister Remy Danjuinou. Eight soldiers have been killed, and 85 others wounded.

To the west of the capital, heavy smoke rose from the army joint chief of staff’s office, where unnamed witnesses reported loud explosions. Windows were broken there and in the surrounding buildings.

== Perpetrators ==
The day after the attack, the group Jama'at Nasr al-Islam wal Muslimin (JNIM), an affiliate group of Al Qaeda in the Islamic Maghreb led by Iyad Ag Ghaly, claimed responsibility for the attack, calling it retaliation for a previous raid during Operation Barkhane by the French army in northern Mali.

On 5 March, the group released a picture of the suicide bomber who detonated the explosives at the army headquarters, identifying him as Yunus al-Fulani.

On 7 March, eight people were arrested in connection to the attack including two military officers.

== Reactions ==
Burkina Faso: Prime Minister Paul Kaba Thieba condemned the attacks, labeling them "revolting." In a statement, President Christian Kaboré said the country had again become the "target of dark forces.” During a subsequent meeting with the presidents of Niger and Togo, Kaboré vowed to "end terrorism no matter what" and claimed "no sacrifice will be too high in the defense of our fatherland.”

Egypt: Egypt's Ministry of Foreign Affairs denounced the attacks in the "strongest terms." The Ministry released a statement expressing support for "the efforts of France and Sahel states in facing this phenomena (sic) that attacks security and stability worldwide."

France: French President Emmanuel Macron spoke by telephone with Burkinabe president Christian Kaboré to issue condolences and pledge his continuing support to the country. French foreign minister Jean-Yves Le Drian announced that a "crisis unit" had been established and said that the security of French nationals in the region was "his priority."

Japan: Japan's Ministry of Foreign Affairs issued a statement strongly condemning the attacks and expressing condolences to those affected. The statement went on to express the commitment of the Japanese government "to continue to support the efforts of the Government of Burkina Faso to improve the security situation in Burkina Faso, in cooperation with the international community."

Saudi Arabia: The Saudi foreign ministry condemned the attack, issued condolences to the victims, and reiterated the Kingdom's rejection of terrorism.

Turkey: Turkish President Recep Tayyip Erdogan said in a press conference while visiting neighboring Mali, "We strongly condemn the terrorist attacks that took place in Ouagadougou".

United Nations: United Nations Secretary-General António Guterres spoke over the phone with President Kaboré, and expressed his solidarity with Burkina Faso as well as his "profound sympathy." The UN Security Council called the attacks "barbaric and cowardly".

United States: In a statement condemning recent violence in West Africa, the White House expressed its "deepest sympathies" to the families of those killed and claimed that the attacks only served to "strengthen the resolve of the United States." The State Department also issued a travel advisory, urging Americans to avoid Burkina Faso due to "terrorism."

== Diplomatic and regional context ==
In December 2025, Burkina Faso released 11 Nigerian Air Force personnel who had been detained after their aircraft made an emergency landing in western Burkina Faso on 8 December 2025. The release followed diplomatic talks between Nigerian officials and Burkina Faso's military leadership, and both countries agreed to strengthen bilateral cooperation and enhance diplomatic consultations amid regional security tensions. This incident highlighted Burkina Faso's active diplomatic engagement with neighbouring states in matters affecting national security.
