= 2017 Ouagadougou attack =

Terrorist attack in Burkina Faso

Coordinates: 12°21′36″N 1°31′3″W

- Part of the Islamist insurgency in Burkina Faso, the War in the Sahel, and the Insurgency in the Maghreb (2002–present)
- Location: Ouagadougou, Burkina Faso
- Date: 13–14 August 2017; 21:00 (GMT)
- Target: Hotel Bravia and the Istanbul Restaurant
- Attack type: Mass shooting, hostage taking
- Deaths: 19 (+3 attackers)
- Injuries: 25
- No. of participants: 4

Nineteen people were killed and 25 others were injured when suspected jihadists opened fire on a Turkish restaurant and hotel in Ouagadougou, Burkina Faso, on 13 August 2017. Police cornered the attackers, who took hostages and then were killed in an ensuing shootout.

== Background ==
Since the 2011 Libyan civil war, instability had spread into central Africa, in particular northern Mali/Azawad where French forces intervened to oust the rebels from Ansar Dine and MOJWA. Meanwhile, the secular MNLA were also in the conflict, though largely separate from both the parties following the Azawadi declaration of independence.

Ouagadougou was also the site of a similar attack in 2016, which took place in the same district as the 2017 attack. Later that year, the region was struck again with the 2016 Grand-Bassam shootings.

== Attack ==
The attack started at about 21:00 GMT (the same as local time) on 13 August. Witnesses reported that four gunmen arrived to the scene in a pickup truck and opened fire on patrons seated outside the Hotel Bravia and the Aziz Istanbul Restaurant. The attack lasted into the early morning hours of 14 August as the attackers exchanged fire with security forces after barricading themselves in the restaurant. Three attackers were killed by security forces after they were cornered in an upper floor of the restaurant and took around 40 hostages. Burkinabe Security Minister Remis Dandjinou said that eventually the hostages had been freed by security forces. He stated that the assailants were reported to be young men, who arrived at the restaurant with AK-47s, riding on motorcycles. Locals say that the restaurant, popular for its European-style bakery, was host to a birthday party the evening of the attack.

=== Victims ===
Eighteen civilians from eight different nationalities and a gendarme were killed.

Deaths by nationality
Country	Number
Burkina Faso	10
Kuwait	2
Canada	2
France	1
Nigeria	1
Senegal	1
Turkey	1
Lebanon	1
Total	19

== Perpetrators ==
It is suspected by the government that al-Qaeda's Maghreb affiliate was behind the attack.

== Reactions ==
Burkinabe president Roch Marc Christian Kaboré condemned the attack, offered condolences to the families of the victims and praised the actions of security forces. French president Emmanuel Macron also condemned the attack and described it as a "terrorist attack". Canadian Prime Minister Justin Trudeau condemned the attack and wished for a speedy recovery for the injured. Kuwaiti Emir Sheikh Subah al-Ahmad al-Subah sent a cable of condolences to the Burkinabe president expressing his sadness and praying for the victims and wishing the injured a speedy recovery. He instructed a special plane be sent to retrieve the bodies of the Kuwaiti victims to their home country. Secretary-General of the United Nations António Guterres condemned the attack, and offered his condolences to the victims.
