= 2019 Koutougou attack =

2019 battle in Burkina Faso

- Part of Jihadist insurgency in Burkina Faso
Date	August 19, 2019
Location	Koutougou, Soum Province, Burkina Faso
Result	ISGS victory

Belligerents
Burkina Faso	Islamic State in the Greater Sahara

Commanders and leaders
Unknown	Abdulhakim al-Sahrawi; Moussa Moumini; Adama Garibou †

Strength
Unknown	~100 fighters 65 motorcycles 4 pickups

Casualties and losses
24 killed 12 injured	30 killed

On August 19, 2019, jihadists from the Islamic State in the Greater Sahara attacked Burkinabe forces in Koutougou, Soum Province, Burkina Faso. 24 Burkinabe soldiers were killed in the attack, and Burkinabe authorities were forced to abandon military outposts in several northern Burkinabe towns following the attack. The attack was the deadliest jihadist attack in Burkinabe history up to that point.

== Background ==
Koutougou is located in northern Burkina Faso's Soum Province, near the Malian and Nigerien borders. Since 2017, three main jihadists groups have been active in the area, those being Jama'at Nasr al-Islam wal-Muslimin, Islamic State in the Greater Sahara, and Ansarul Islam. These groups have conducted deadly ambushes against Burkinabe forces in the north for years, including in Loroni in December 2018, which prompted President Roch Marc Christian Kaboré to declare a state of emergency in the region.

== Attack ==
The attack began at around 5 am on August 19. According to France 24, a hundred or so jihadists participated in the attack, although a security source speaking to AFP stated several dozen fighters participated. The jihadists attacked the Burkinabe military base in the town of Koutougou aboard motorcycles and pickups, coming from the west and leaving in that same direction. A witness told VOA that the shooting lasted for two and a half hours until 7:30 am, and that the soldiers in the base were caught by surprise. The jihadists first fired rockets at the base, and as they raided the camp the base and dormitories were torched. The attackers stole motorcycles and weapons.

No group claimed responsibility for the attack immediately afterward. Malian media Nord Sud Journal reported that Burkinabe sources assessed that the attack was carried out by the second-in-command of the Islamic State in the Greater Sahara (ISGS), Abdulhakim al-Sahrawi along with ISGS commander Moussa Moumini. The journal also mentioned that ISGS used 65 motorcycles and four pick-ups, and arrived in Koutougou from the village of Beri in Déou Department. The jihadists divided into three groups, launching the attack at 4am, seizing the base a 5am, and withdrawing at 6am. One group fled northeast and one group fled south.

== Aftermath ==
ISGS did not claim responsibility in the central Islamic State's Al-Naba until September 19, a month after the attack. Le Monde, however, reported that the attack was carried out jointly with Jama'at Nasr al-Islam wal-Muslimin.

=== Casualties ===
Burkinabe forces initially reported on the evening of August 19 a toll of ten soldiers killed, although AFP mentioned that that number could easily exceed twenty. Kalidou Sy, the Burkinabe correspondent for France 24, published a toll that night of 24 killed. The following day, Burkinabe officials revised the toll to 24 killed, seven wounded, and five soldiers missing. The Burkinabe government statement also stated many attackers were killed in a "vast air and land sweeping operation." The five missing soldiers were found alive but injured on August 22.

The Koutougou attack was at that point the deadliest terror attack committed by jihadists in Burkinabe history. Nord Sud Journal reported that six jihadists were killed in the attack, and two more were killed several hours later near the Malian border by a Burkinabe helicopter. A villager on the Malian-Burkinabe border also stated that nine jihadists succumbed to their injuries in the days following the attack. By September 24, the Nord Sud Journal assessed that 24 jihadists had been killed or succumbed to their injuries after fleeing Koutougou, including prominent Burkinabe ISGS commander Adama Garibou. Garibou was the highest-ranking Burkinabe in ISGS until his death.

=== Reactions ===
The main opposition party in Burkina Faso, the Union for Progress and Reform (UPC), called on the Christophe Dabiré government to resign on August 20. President Roch Marc Christian Kaboré condemned the attack and stated that "Burkinabe people won't give up an inch of our territory, even if we have to lose our lives." The Burkinabe government declared three days of national mourning on August 23.

On the night between August 22 and 23, gunshots were fired by disgruntled soldiers at the Guillaume-Ouedraogo military base in Ouagadougou. The soldiers were demanding new security measures to be implemented before they were redeployed to Koutougou. The soldiers calmed down after talks with Burkinabe officials.

Burkinabe forces abandoned military posts in Nassoumbou, Inata, Tongomayel, Baraboulé, and Koutougou following the attack. All five areas are located on the Malian border.
