= 2021 Inata attack =

- Part of Jihadist insurgency in Burkina Faso
Date	November 14, 2021
Location	Inata, Soum Province, Burkina Faso
Result	Jihadist victory: Resignation of Dabire government; Key motivation for January 2022 Burkina Faso coup d'état

Belligerents
Burkina Faso	Jama'at Nasr al-Islam wal Muslimin; Ansarul Islam

Strength
100–150 soldiers	300 fighters

Casualties and losses
53 killed 20 missing	Unknown
- 4 civilians killed

On November 14, 2021, jihadists from Ansarul Islam and Jama'at Nasr al-Islam wal-Muslimin attacked the mining town of Inata, Burkina Faso, the last place in Djibo Department under Burkinabe government control at the time of the attack. The Burkinabe outpost in Inata was overrun and over fifty soldiers were killed. The attack was the deadliest ambush against Burkinabe forces since the start of the jihadist insurgency in Burkina Faso in 2015, and was a primary reason for the January 2022 Burkina Faso coup d'état.

== Background ==
Inata is a gold mining town in northern Burkina Faso's Soum Province, a hotspot of activity by jihadist groups Ansarul Islam and Jama'at Nasr al-Islam wal-Muslimin (JNIM). The town had been attacked before in 2018 by Ansarul Islam, but these attacks were repelled. At the time of the attack in November 2021, Inata was the last area of Djibo Department under Burkinabe government control. Since 2021, JNIM had become the dominant jihadist group in the region after driving out the Islamic State in the Greater Sahara earlier that year. The region was so dangerous and volatile that the Burkinabe garrison in Djibo refused to relieve the soldiers in Inata except by helicopter.

The living conditions in the Burkinabe camp at Inata were deplorable. The base was constantly besieged and attacked by jihadists who targeted their supplies, and soldiers were often forced to scavenge and hunt for food. On November 12, 2021, the commander of the Inata garrison alerted Burkinabe officials that "for two weeks, the detachment had been feeding itself by slaughtering animals," and requested authorization to leave the position. Reinforcements who were supposed to take over the garrison refused to go to the frontline without aerial and armored support, which Burkinabe authorities did not grant.

== Attack ==
At the time of the attack, Inata was being defended by 100 to 150 soldiers and gendarmes, according to RFI. AFP stated 150 were present, and Le Monde stated 120 men were in Inata. Le Monde reported that the attack was led by jihadists from JNIM with militants from Ansarul Islam. AFP initially reported that the jihadist attack was led by "a large number of armed individuals" riding on motorcycles and pick-ups. This number was later assessed to be around 300 fighters.

The attack occurred at 5:30 a.m., with the jihadists launching an assault on the Inata base located near an old mine. Fighting was intense, and the gendarmes were quickly overpowered by the jihadists. Several gendarmes were shot dead trying to flee the area. The jihadists then torched the camp buildings before fleeing.

== Aftermath ==
The first report following the attack stated at least twenty soldiers were killed, but this number was revised several times by the Burkinabe government. On November 17, the Minister of Communications Ousseni Tamboura stated in a cabinet meeting that the death toll was 49 gendarmes and 4 civilians killed, and that 46 gendarmes had been found alive. On November 22, Tamboura stated that 57 people had been killed including 53 gendarmes. As of December 8, 2021, twenty soldiers were still missing. The attack was the deadliest attack against Burkinabe forces since the start of the jihadist insurgency in Burkina Faso.

A video released by a unit claiming to be JNIM showed dozens of attackers storming the base with machine guns mounted on pick-ups. JNIM stated that sixty soldiers were killed and released photos of looted weaponry, including 86 assault rifles, five RPGs, and several machine guns. The military base in Inata was completely destroyed.

=== Reactions ===
President Roch Marc Christian Kaboré declared national mourning for three days. Hundreds of people protested in several cities across Burkina Faso over the government's ineffectiveness in fighting the jihadists, with some protesters demanding the resignation of Kabore. On the night between November 17 and 18, a French convoy was blocked by protesters for several hours between Bobo-Dioulasso and Ouagadougou.

Burkinabe officials dismissed the commander of the Northern Sector, covering Centre-Nord Region, Nord Region, and Sahel Region, and the commander the first gendarmerie region that covers Kaya Department, Ouahigouya Department, and Dori Department. Kabore promised that there would be no more talk of food issues in the Burkinabe army. Prime Minister Christophe Dabiré resigned on December 8, 2021, along with the entire Burkinabe government due to backlash from the attack. Dabire was replaced by Lassina Zerbo.

The government instability due to Dabire's resignation, the food shortages leading up to the Inata attack, and the attack itself all served as rationale for the January 2022 Burkina Faso coup d'état led by Paul-Henri Sandaogo Damiba that overthrew Kabore.
