= Battle of Ariel =

2017 battle in Burkina Faso

- Part of Jihadist insurgency in Burkina Faso
Date	November 9, 2017
Location	Ariel, Soum Province, Burkina Faso
Result	Burkinabe victory

Belligerents
Burkina Faso	Ansarul Islam

Casualties and losses
4 injured	10 killed

On November 9, 2017, clashes broke out between Burkinabe forces and Ansarul Islam in the hills between Kereboule and Ariel, Soum Province, Burkina Faso. It was the first major victory against jihadists by the Burkinabe government since the start of the jihadist insurgency in the country.

== Background ==
The jihadist insurgency in Burkina Faso began in 2015 when jihadist militant groups from Mali and Niger began expanding into northern and western Burkina Faso, conducting attacks on civilians and Burkinabe forces. In October 2016, Ansarul Islam was formed by Ibrahim Malam Dicko, effectively becoming the first homegrown Burkinabe jihadist group. Ansarul Islam's first attack was in Nassoumbou, killing a dozen Burkinabe soldiers.

== Battle ==
On the night between November 8 and 9, 2017, a group of Ansarul Islam jihadists were spotted in the hills between the villages of Kereboule and Ariel in Soum Province. The Burkinabe army decided to intervene, mobilizing an anti-terrorist detachment based in Nassoumbou to carry out the operation. Fighting began on November 9 at around 1:30 p.m. in the village of Ariel, lasting for two hours. Burkinabe forces eventually pushed the jihadists out of Ariel. The victory was the first tangible victory against the jihadists from the Burkinabe forces.

Initial reports stated that four militants were killed in the battle, and that four soldiers were injured. A Burkinabe military source speaking to Jeune Afrique stated that ten jihadists were killed, and a large stockpile of weapons was also captured. One soldier was also temporarily reported missing before being found.
