= Arbinda attack =

2019 militant attack in Burkina Faso

December 2019 Arbinda attack
- Part of the Islamist insurgency in Burkina Faso
Date	24 December 2019
Location	Arbinda, Soum Province, Burkina Faso 14.22917°N 0.86333°W
Result	Burkinabe victory

Belligerents
Burkina Faso	Islamic State in the Greater Sahara

Strength
Unknown	200 – 300

Casualties and losses
7 killed 17 wounded	30–80 killed
- 35 civilians killed, 6 wounded

On December 24, 2019, militants from the Islamic State in the Greater Sahara attacked the Burkinabe government military base in Arbinda, Sahel Region, Burkina Faso along with the town of Arbinda itself. The attack was halted due to French and Burkinabe air intervention, although 35 civilians were killed in the jihadists' massacre. The Arbinda attack was the deadliest incident in the jihadist insurgency in Burkina Faso in several years.

== Background ==
The town of Arbinda in northern Burkina Faso was the site of various violent attacks between Mossi militias called Koglweogos, backed by the Burkinabe government, and Fulani civilians alleged to be sympathetic or involved with jihadist groups active in the area. Gendarmes in Arbinda were responsible for the killing of 116 men, most of whom were Fulani, between mid-2018 and February 2019. Between March 31 and April 2, 2019, inter-ethnic clashes between Mossi militias, Fulani militias, and Kurumba militias left 62 people dead in Arbinda. The Burkinabe government claimed that the clashes involved "terrorists." On June 9, nineteen more civilians were killed in Arbinda.

In October, jihadists attacked Dolmane near Arbinda, killing twenty gold miners. A second attack on Arbinda on November 20 was repelled by Burkinabe forces, killing at least eighteen jihadists and only one gendarme.

== Attack ==
Fighting in Arbinda began at 6am on December 24, 2019. Burkinabe officials stated that a "significant number of terrorists" carried out the attack, with the jihadists simultaneously attacking the Burkinabe military base and the town of Arbinda itself. AFP reported that around 200 jihadists participated in the attack, although a Burkinabe official told Le Monde that 300 men participated. Many of the attackers were Fulani.

The attack began with a suicide bomber driving a VBIED into the military base. Clashes between the jihadists and soldiers lasted for two to three hours and was unusually intense. The battle was interrupted by a Burkinabe A-29 Super Tucano and two French Mirage 2000s launching airstrikes, repelling the attack. However, the jihadists had massacred dozens of civilians, mostly women and internally displaced refugees. The rationale for the killings was not immediately known, although it could've been a reprisal for the killings of Fulani months prior.

== Aftermath ==
=== Perpetrator ===
The attack was not immediately claimed, and Ansarul Islam and the Islamic State in the Greater Sahara were the main suspects. The latter claimed responsibility on December 27, 2019.

=== Casualties ===
On December 24, the Burkinabe government assessed that seven Burkinabe fighters were killed; four soldiers and three gendarmes, and twenty other Burkinabe men wounded. The number of wounded was later reduced to 17. Burkinabe officials also announced that 35 civilians had been killed by the jihadists, including 31 women. Six other civilians had been wounded. The Burkinabe government also stated that 80 jihadists had been killed in the attacks and a hundred motorcycles had been captured.

Journalist Wassim Nasr stated that the Burkinabe claim of 80 killed was likely an exaggeration. Matteo Puxton, an expert on the Islamic State, stated that photos only showed the bodies of thirty to forty jihadists. Both Puxton and Nasr stated that the 80 number was part of a series of exaggerated, unprovable death tolls from operations against jihadists.

ISGS stated that they had killed seven Burkinabe soldiers, but did not mention the massacred civilians.

=== Reactions ===
The Burkinabe government announced two days of national mourning beginning on December 25. President Roch Marc Christian Kaboré condemned the barbarity of the attack, and praised the gendarmes. Secretary-General of the UN António Guterres condemned the attack alongside Pope Francis, European Union president Charles Michel, and Nigerien president Mahamadou Issoufou.
