= Belehede massacre =

2019 mass murder in Burkina Faso

- Part of Jihadist insurgency in Burkina Faso
- Location: Belehede, Soum Province, Burkina Faso
- Date: June 18, 2019; 3pm – 5pm
- Deaths: 18
- Injuries: Unknown
- Perpetrator: Ansarul Islam (suspected)
- Motive: Reprisal for government presence in village

On June 18, 2019, jihadists suspected to be from Ansarul Islam attacked the village of Belehede, Soum Province, Burkina Faso, killing 18 civilians.

== Background ==
Soum Province in northern Burkina Faso has been a hotbed of jihadist activity since the start of the jihadist insurgency in Burkina Faso. Tensions between Mossi groups and Fulani groups after the Yirgou massacre in early 2019 led to clashes between these groups in the provincial capital of Arbinda in April. The tensions were stoked by the Fulani-majority jihadist group Ansarul Islam, which has a large presence in Soum. On June 10, an Ansarul Islam attack killed 19 civilians in the center of Arbinda.

Prior to the massacre, during "Operation Doofu", the Burkinabe military used Belehede's school as a launching pad for patrols in the area against jihadist groups. These groups later used the military presence as justification for the massacre.

== Massacre ==
At around 3pm on June 18, a survivor of the attack stated she saw jihadists enter the town on motorcycles. As they entered, they broke into houses and shops, looting and pillaging the village. The survivor said that the jihadists attacked the village because they accused the population of providing information and support to Burkinabe government forces. All of the dead were Fulse and Mossi, with four children killed in the attack as well.

On June 20, Minister of Defence Chérif Sy stated that "armed terrorist groups" attacked the village of Belehede, killing 17 civilians. Sy also stated that government forces were conducting a counter-terrorist operation in the area.

== Aftermath ==
No group claimed responsibility for the attack, but Ansarul Islam is suspected due to its presence in the area. After the attack, many residents from Belehede joined pro-government VDP militias and fought in the Siege of Djibo.
