= Dibilou massacre =

- Part of Jihadist insurgency in Burkina Faso
- Location: Dibilou, Centre-Nord Region, Burkina Faso
- Date: July 25, 2019; 4:45 pm
- Deaths: 22
- Perpetrator: Unknown jihadists
- No. of participants: ~50

On July 25, 2019, unknown jihadists attacked the village of Dibilou, Centre-Nord Region, Burkina Faso, killing 22 civilians.

== Background ==
Northern Burkina Faso has been a hotbed of jihadist activity since the start of the jihadist insurgency in Burkina Faso. Tensions between Mossi groups and Fulani groups after the Yirgou massacre in early 2019 led to clashes between these groups in the city of Arbinda in April. The tensions were stoked by the Fulani-majority jihadist group Ansarul Islam, which has a large presence in Soum. On June 10, an Ansarul Islam attack killed 19 civilians in the center of Arbinda. Eight days later, jihadists attacked Belehede, killing eighteen civilians.

== Massacre ==
At the time of the attack, the town of Dibilou had no government-sponsored self-defense militia. This militia had departed the town in early January. A survivor of the massacre in Dibilou stated that around 25 motorcycles, each with two men on them, entered the town at around 4:45pm on July 25. The attackers immediately began shooting at residents, with many hiding in their homes. During the attack, the perpetrators torched the market and several homes.

All of the victims were of Mossi descent, and many bodies were found in the market and in their home. Several other bodies were discovered in their farms on the outskirts of the town. 22 people were killed during the massacre.

== Aftermath ==
Many residents of Dibilou and the neighboring town of Rofenega fled elsewhere following the attack, with many settling in Kaya. No group claimed responsibility for the attack.
