= April 2019 Arbinda clashes =

- Part of Jihadist insurgency in Burkina Faso, Anti-Fulani sentiment
- Location: Arbinda and surrounding villages, Soum Province, Burkina Faso
- Date: March 31 - April 2, 2019
- Deaths: 69: 62 Fulani killed by Fulse civilians; 7 killed in Hamkan by Ansarul Islam
- Injuries: Unknown
- Victims: 9 civilians kidnapped, hundreds displaced
- Perpetrators: Fulse civilians Ansarul Islam (in Hamkan)
- Motive: Reprisal killings for Hamkan attack

Between March 31 and April 2, 2019, intercommunal clashes broke out in Arbinda commune, Burkina Faso between Fulani and Fulse civilians after an attack by Ansarul Islam killed seven people in Hamkan, near Arbinda. The killings prompted Fulse civilians to conduct reprisal attacks on Fulani civilians, killing 62 people. The Burkinabe government stated that 30 people were killed in intercommunal clashes, and 32 were killed by Ansarul Islam.

== Background ==
Ansarul Islam is a Burkinabe jihadist group founded in 2016 as part of the spillover from the Mali War. The group is predominantly Fulani, and gained a small following among Fulani in northern Burkina Faso who felt abandoned by the Mossi-majority government. In early 2019, the group's low-level insurgency gained much starker ethnic lines after an attack on the Mossi village of Yirgou at the start of 2019 led to retaliatory attacks on Fulani civilians by Mossi militias, killing over 200 people. Since August 2018, the Burkinabe government has aided Mossi militias in hunting down jihadists, with Burkinabe forces killing at least 116 mainly-Fulani civilians until March 2019. Ansarul Islam rarely discriminated attacks by ethnic group, with all ethnic groups in the north being targeted. At the time of the clashes, the Burkinabe government had little presence in Arbinda.

== Clashes ==
The clashes began as a result of an Ansarul Islam incursion into the village of Hamkan, seven kilometers from Arbinda, where the jihadists assassinated the revered local religious leader Cheikh Werem Issouf and six of his relatives on March 31. The women of Issouf's family were raped. As news of the killings spread throughout Arbinda commune, local communities began a series of reprisal attacks, kidnappings, and killing that devolved along ethnic lines. A resident of Arbinda speaking to Voice of America said that between April 1 and 2, locals began blaming their relatives and neighbors of complicity.

Simeon Sawadogo, the Minister of Territorial Administration, released a statement on April 4 saying that between March 31 and April 2, 30 people were killed in intercommunal clashes and 32 were killed by "terrorists". Sawadogo mentioned that the government was working with local political and religious leaders in Arbinda to quell the violence. The United States Department of State, on the other hand, stated that the 62 deaths were caused by Fulse residents attacking Fulani civilians in and around Arbinda. Nine people were kidnapped during the attacks, and hundreds more were displaced.
