= Siege of Djibo =

Battle between Burkina Faso and Jihadist rebels

- Part of the Islamist insurgency in Burkina Faso and Insurgency in the Maghreb (2002–present)
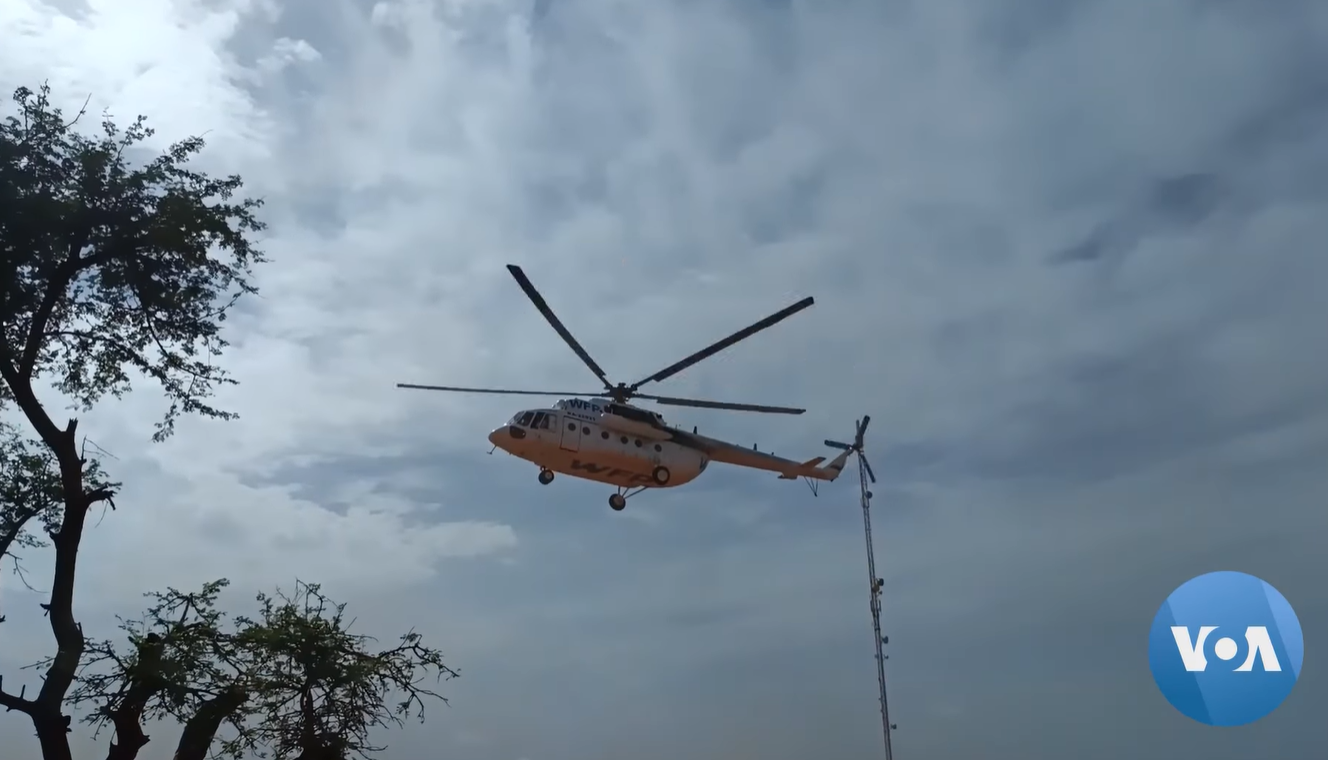
- World Food Programme helicopter landing in besieged Djibo, September 2022
Date	16/17 February 2022 – present (4 years, 8 months, 2 weeks and 3 days)
Location	Djibo, Burkina Faso 14°06′04″N 01°37′50″W

Belligerents
Burkina Faso; France (until February 2023)	Ansarul Islam; Al-Qaeda: Jama'at Nasr al-Islam wal Muslimin (JNIM)

Commanders and leaders
(Burkina Faso) William Baguera (c. 2022) (Burkina Faso) Poignard (BIR 22)	Djaffar Dicko (Ansarul Islam); Ousmane Dicko (Ansarul Islam); Tidiane Djibrilou Dicko † (JNIM)

Units involved
Burkina Faso Armed Forces: Ground Forces; 14th Inter-Arms Regiment; 22e Bataillon d'intervention Rapide (BIR); Air Force; Volunteers for the Defense of the Homeland (VDP); French Air Force (until February 2023)	Several JNIM groups: Tidiane Djibrilou Dicko's "katiba"; Katiba Macina (per Critical Threats Project)
- Location within Burkina Faso

The siege of Djibo is an ongoing blockade of the city of Djibo in Burkina Faso by several factions of Jihadist Islamist rebels. The siege began in February 2022, and is part of the Jihadist insurgency in Burkina Faso.

Djibo is located in Burkina Faso's north, an area which is one of the centers of Jihadist rebel activity. Since the start of the Jihadist insurgency in 2015, the city was gradually isolated from the rest of the country as the rebels increased their attacks. From early 2022, the rebels organized a large-scale blockade by first evicting villagers from the territories around Djibo, forcing the refugees to seek shelter in the settlement. They then began to attack the local infrastructure, prevented people from leaving Djibo, and ambushed supply convoys to the city, subjecting its inhabitants to starvation. Though the Burkinabé security forces have been able to occasionally transport new supplies to Djibo, the situation of the encircled population became increasingly difficult as months passed. Negotiations between government representatives and insurgents, aimed at ending the siege peacefully, were sabotaged by pro-government militias. By early 2023, the blockade had been strengthened to the point that Djibo was mainly supplied via airlift.

== Background ==
Djibo serves as the capital of Soum Province and was originally one of the most important hubs of cattle trade in the Sahel. From the start of the Jihadist insurgency in Burkina Faso in 2015, the area around Djibo was a center for rebel activity. As the fighting escalated, the city was increasingly isolated by rebels. Local officials and security forces were already fearing constant attacks by 2019, and France24 described Djibo as "liv[ing] as though in a state of siege". Insecurity in the area further worsened from November 2021.

As villages in Soum Province became more exposed to rebel attacks, many people fled from the rural areas and sought safety in Djibo. In January 2022, the Burkina Faso Armed Forces launched Operation Laabingol 1 and destroyed several insurgent camps in the north, mostly in Soum Province. In response, the rebels aimed at attacking the 14th Inter-Arms Regiment which is based at Djibo.

== Siege ==
=== Initial encirclement and negotiation attempts ===
The siege began on 16 or 17 February 2022. Jihadist forces surrounded the city, preventing locals from leaving as well as supplies from coming into the settlement. The rebels intercepted public transport buses and goods trucks between Bourzanga and Namssiguia, informing the drivers that they would be executed if any of them tried to enter Djibo. They also toured villages around the city, telling the locals to leave within three days. The settlements of Baagadoumba, Baama, Mandali, Sintaou, Firguindi, Djaw djaw, Baakoore, Senobaani, and Inagani were abandoned, and its inhabitants relocated to Djibo, while the population of Ganoua, Sè, Petelthioudi, Pilaadi and Simbè were taken hostage by the jihadists and forbidden from entering the city. Thus, the city's population increased from 60,000 to 200,000–300,000 people. By forcing much of the local population into a very confined area within the city boundaries, the rebels put pressure on the security forces, destroyed the local economy, and made it more difficult for the government to supply Dijbo.

The besieging rebels belong to several groups, including Ansarul Islam and al-Qaeda-linked JNIM. The rebels maintain the siege by regularly ambushing supply convoys, mining the roads into the city, erecting checkpoints, and destroying the local water infrastructure. By early March, shortages of food and water were already creating a "dire humanitarian situation". The Burkina Faso Air Force bombed jihadists near Djibo from 20 to 22 March, reportedly killing 53. On the other side, the rebels attacked the city in the same month, damaging the local water facilities. Before retreating, the rebel raiders reportedly told the locals that they would inflict a "Ukrainian death" (French: "la mort ukrainienne") on the city, referencing the then-ongoing Siege of Mariupol.

In April, the Burkinabé military junta attempted to organize talks with the rebels to lift the siege. The Emir of Djibo Boubacari Dicko, his advisors and other local dignitaries met with Ansarul Islam commanders near the town, as the insurgents preferred to negotiate with these individuals rather than regular government officials. Ansarul Islam demanded that the inhabitants of Djibo close all their bars, stop arrests, and that the men should grow beards and wear short pants in accordance with their Islamist clothing standards. In addition, the city was supposed to become neutral in the insurgency. The emir told the rebels that these demands were difficult to fulfill, though he and the other representatives would try as long as the siege was lifted. Despite the vagueness of this response, Ansarul Islam leader Jafar Dicko agreed to ease his group's blockade of the city on 20/21 April. The Burkina Faso Armed Forces were thus able to escort a convoy of 100 food trucks to Dijbo. However, the agreement only involved groups not linked to al-Qaeda and the Islamic State; rebel factions belonging to these organizations thus continued their attacks in the area. In addition, the military reportedly tried to prevent free movement out of Djibo, as it feared that locals might smuggle food to the besieging rebels. Abuses committed by the military and pro-government VDP militias against civilians in Djibo ultimately "scuttled the dialogue aiming to lift the blockade on the town". As 20 civilians attempted to leave Djibo, they were murdered by the VDPs. The VDP militiamen, many of whom were not locals, were fiercely opposed to any compromise with the jihadists.

=== Growing pressure ===
[...] carcasses of trucks and cars having hit mines, blown up bridges, electric poles on the ground or bent, and ghost villages where people have stormed off, abandoning everything.

— Journalist Liradan Philippe Ada describing the route from Bourzanga to Djibo by May 2022 (Note: Translated from French. In the original, this reads: "[...] des carcasses de camions et de voitures ayant percuté des mines, des ponts dynamités, des poteaux électriques à terre ou courbés, et des villages fantômes où les gens sont partis en trombe en abandonnant tout".)

By May, the city was once again mostly cut off from outside aid, and suffered under food and water shortages. On 26 May, an airstrike by the Burkina Faso Air Force killed JNIM commander Tidiane Djibrilou Dicko and ten other militants near Djibo. On 2 June, rebels raided the city and bombarded two local security forces bases, killing a soldier and four VDPs. This attack further demoralized the local population, and when a convoy of traders attempted to leave the city for the south, so many people tried to climb onto their trucks to escape Djibo that the convoy had to be cancelled. In July, the rebels blew up two bridges to Djibo, further hindering any attempts to supply the city by land. In early August, a military convoy to Djibo was struck by a roadside bomb, killing 15 soldiers. At this point, most people in Djibo had access to one meal per day at most, and many had begun resorting to eating tree leaves.

On 5 September, a roadside bomb hit a supply convoy from Bourzanga which was trying to reach Djibo; 35 people were killed and dozens injured. On 26 September, a supply convoy to Djibo was ambushed by JNIM. The ambush killed 26 soldiers, 10 civilians, and left 95 vehicles destroyed. Burkinabé officers requested support by the forces involved in Operation Barkhane, and the French Air Force intervened to save what remained of the beset convoy. This ambush further undermined public confidence in Interim President Paul-Henri Sandaogo Damiba's government, and possibly contributed to his overthrow on 30 September. By early October, Djibo was mainly supplied by humanitarian flights. On 24 October, JNIM insurgents assaulted the 14th Inter-Arms Regiment's base in Djibo, killing at least ten soldiers and wounding 40 more. Security forces stated that the attackers suffered 18 dead. JNIM claimed that it had also freed 67 prisoners during the raid, and captured 400 "light weapons".

By early November, thousands of civilians had fled Djibo. Facing mass starvation and no longer believing that the government could break the siege, they had opted to risk a trek through rebel-held areas. A spokesman for a group of civil society organisations in the Soum Province declared that the "situation is catastrophic in Djibo", referencing that at least 15 people had died of hunger in the city in the month of October. Meanwhile, Burkina Faso's new President, Ibrahim Traoré, visited Djibo, expressing horror at seeing "children who have skin on their bones, the old people who are dying of hunger, the women who can no longer breastfeed because they have nothing left in their breasts". He also used the occasion to laud the 14th Inter-Arms Regiment for their role in defending Djibo. In the same month, army soldiers and VDP militiamen reportedly attacked villages near Djibo and killed local civilians, resulting in calls for an investigation by the Office of the United Nations High Commissioner for Human Rights.

By December, 370,000 people remained besieged in Djibo, with the local civilians forced to exist largely on the consumption of wild leaves. Many had to regularly go hungry for several days before receiving food packages by the government or NGOs. At this point, food supplies almost exclusively reached the city via an airlift organized by the UN World Food Programme. At this point, the Burkinabe government became increasingly critical of certain foreign powers in regards to the Islamist insurgency, blaming France for the situation and accusing Barbara Manzi, United Nations representative for Burkina Faso, of cooperating with the rebels besieging Djibo. In February 2023, the junta demanded that all French forces leave the country; France subsequently terminated its military support mission. Instead, the Burkinabe government declared its intention to seek support from Russia. Meanwhile, conditions in Djibo continued to detoriate. On 21 March, a military-protected supply convoy managed to reach Djibo for the first time since November; the convoy, consisting of 74 trucks, brought not just a large amount of food, but also military supplies for the 14th Inter-Arms Regiment.

In late June, another convoy reached Djibo to deliver supplies. However, the convoy was ambushed at Namsiguia on its way back, resulting in the deaths of at least 31 soldiers and three VDP militiamen. Several more militiamen were reported as missing, while army officials claimed that over 40 attackers had been killed.

=== November 2023 assault ===
On 26 November 2023, a large contingent of JNIM insurgents stormed Djibo using motorcycles and pickup trucks after shelling the area first. Security forces later claimed that the rebel force had included around 3,000 militants who had attacked in waves, starting at around 2:00 or 3:00 pm. Government forces admitted that the JNIM insurgents had been able to penetrate the local military base and kill several Burkinabe soldiers, though the number was not specified. According to local sources, the rebels completely overran the base. In other parts of the town, JNIM fighters attacked homes, camps, and shops. They killed at least 40 civilians and injured 42 more. The jihadists burned down 20 shops and three sites for displaced people.

The attack lasted for about three hours, and most rebels soon began to retreat, taking much loot with them, including guns, ammunition, and even armored vehicles. By 6:00 pm, most insurgents had left Djibo; at this point, the Burkinabe Air Force began to attack the rebels. According to security forces, a counter-attack by ground forces aided by the Air Force drove the insurgents from the city. The government forces subsequently claimed that they had inflicted heavy casualties on the jihadists, and launched immediate counter-attacks; overall, the military claimed that it had killed over 400 rebels in and around Djibo in the span of two days. After the attack, Doctors Without Borders treated locals who had been injured during the fighting. The overall situation in the area remained confused, though locals reported that the military had indeed retaken the local base.

=== Continued operations ===
Today, if you have food in Djibo, you're a king. Men use food to demand sexual favors, and some women are ready to do anything just to eat.

— Anonymous "humanitarian source", quoted by La Croix in November 2024

In Januar 2024, the Burkinabe military set up new Rapid Intervention Battalions; one of the new units, the 22e Bataillon d'intervention Rapide (BIR 22), was stationed in Djibo. By mid-2024, the insurgents had further tightened the siege. One farmer reported that local civilians risked death or abduction by venturing just outside the city to tend to pea and millet fields. In July, the local office of Doctors Without Borders came under fire during a rebel raid into Djibo. Doctors Without Borders suspended its activities in the city on 21 October, citing security concerns. By November, pressure on the city had increased to such a degree that local residents avoided conversations with journalists out of fear of rebel retributions. As a result of frequent attacks, the road used for military-protected aid convoys had become locally known as the "Highway of Death"; local food supplies had become heavily depleted as months went by without large food deliveries. Some residents had opted to relocate to rebel-held villages due to hunger.

At dawn on 30 January 2025, "several dozen" jihadist militants entered northeastern Djibo and clashed with the local defenders, including the BIR 22. The insurgents were ultimately repelled by the Burkinabé military and VDP militiamen. There were conflicting reports about losses. JNIM assumed responsibility for the January attack, claiming that it had captured a number of "military positions" inside the city during the operation. On 10 April, JNIM again attacked the military positions at the outskirts of Djibo. At this point, much of the city's population had gathered in trench-surrounded neighborhoods which were located around the local military camp. The rest of the settlement was described as a ghost town by Radio France Internationale.

At 6am on 11 May 2025, JNIM launched another attack on Djibo's military bases and urban areas. Critical Threats Project analyst Liam Karr argued that this operation "may have involved multiple JNIM subgroups", including Katiba Macina and Ansarul Islam; it was commanded by Ousmane Dicko, younger brother of Ansarul Islam leader Djaffar Dicko. The attack was coordinated to occur at the same time as seven other insurgent attacks around the country, dispersing the Burkina Faso Air Force. As a result, no effective air support was provided to Djibo's garrison when hundreds of rebels launched an assault, overrunning the city's entry checkpoints and then striking the military camps, focusing on the Special Anti-Terrorist Unit's camp. The rebels continued to operate inside Djibo for hours, killing at least 100 people, mostly soldiers. Some male civilians were reportedly also executed by JNIM militants in front of their homes. The insurgents eventually retreated before a government counter-attack could be mustered. Using 14.5mm antiaircraft guns, the rebels fended off eventual intervention attempts by the Burkina Faso Air Force. ACLED analyst Heni Nsaibia described this operation as unprecedented JNIM success, stating that the insurgents had captured about $3 million worth of munitions during their raid.

On 27 June, another supply convoy managed to reach Djibo. This considerably improved the situation in Djibo, with basic services being restored to some degree. Security forces made efforts to enable farmers to return to their fields around the city. In September 2025, JNIM organized an offensive in the Soum corridor, with Djibo being one of the targeted locations. On 17 September, rebels carried out a major raid against the city. By November, Karr argued that JNIM "could likely capture Djibo city should it choose to", pointing out that the rebel group had inflicted "as many fatalities in Djibo commune in 2025 as it did in 2023 and 2024 combined". In the same month, Emir Boubacari Dicko of Djibo died of an illness. Due to his status as an important traditional and religious leader as well as mediator, his demise was described by Radio France Internationale as a heavy blow to the community.

By mid-2026, the situation in Djibo was still described as "catastrophic" by local residents. Civilians also stated that the garrison increasingly prevented them from fleeing the town, with soldiers and militiamen claiming that the continued civilian exodus would eventually leave no one to defend Djibo. Furthermore, residents and international aid workers suspected that this was part of an effort by the government to downplay the extent of the regional refugee crisis. On 30 October 2026, BIR 22 commander Poignard organized celebrations for the 66th anniversary of the Burkinabe military in Djibo, seeking to improve local morale.

== Reactions ==
In response to the November 2023 attack during the siege, the United Nations condemned the killings of dozens of civilians. In a statement, UN spokesperson Seif Magango said, "Attacks on civilians are inexcusable and must stop, and those responsible must be held to account following thorough, impartial and independent investigations by the authorities." Magango also reiterated that the deliberate targeting of civilians and non-combatants is a war crime, and called on all parties to respect international humanitarian law.
