= 2022 Bandiagara highway bombing =

Bombing in Mopti region, Mali

- Part of the Mali War
- Location: Sibo, Bandiagara-Goundaka highway, Mopti region, Mali
- Date: October 13, 2022
- Deaths: 11 civilians killed
- Injuries: 53 injured
- Perpetrator: Jama'at Nasr al-Islam wal Muslimin

On October 13, 2022, an IED hit a civilian bus travelling along the Bandiagara-Goundaka highway in rural Mali, killing 10 civilians and injuring dozens more. The attack was alleged to be coordinated by Jama'at Nasr al-Islam wal Muslimin (JNIM).

== Prelude ==
The tri-state area between Mali, Burkina Faso, and Niger has been a hub of jihadist violence since 2013, escalating in 2015. The area is home to several jihadist groups, including Jama'at Nasr al-Islam wal Muslimin, Islamic State in the Greater Sahara, and Ansar ul Islam. In these areas, these militant groups often conduct bombings or ambushes along the highway against Malian, Nigerien, and Burkinabe troops, although they often conduct attacks against civilians. In 2022, the United Nations reported an increase in civilian attacks in rural Mali, especially due to roadside bombs. The Mopti region, where Bandiagara is located, was the deadliest region for these attacks, due to fighting between the army, pro-government and ethnic civilian militias, and the jihadist groups across the Mali-Burkina Faso border. Two deadly bus bombings and ambushes occurred in northern Burkina Faso in September 2022, with one in Silgadji and one in Gaskinde killing a total of over seventy people, including dozens of civilians.

== Bombing ==
On the afternoon of October 13, a civilian convoy was travelling between Bandiagara and Goundaka, when they hit an IED near the village of Sibo. Moussa Houseyni, the leader of the Bandiagara Youth Association, in conjunction with local hospitals, claimed that the death toll was eleven killed and fifty-three people injured. A local policeman, speaking to Libération, claimed all the dead were civilians. Data from the Armed Conflict Location and Event Data Project (ACLED) suggested the perpetrator was Jama'at Nasr al-Islam wal Muslimin.
