= Silgadji, Burkina Faso =

Town in Burkina Faso

Silgadji
- Town
- Location within Burkina Faso
- Coordinates: 13°49′N 1°18′W
- Country: Burkina Faso
- Region: Sahel
- Province: Soum
- Department: Tongomayel
- Elevation: 323 m (1,060 ft)
- Highest elevation: 479 m (1,572 ft)
- Lowest elevation: 291 m (955 ft)

Population (2012)
  - Total: 4,977
- Time zone: UTC+0 (GMT)

Silgadji is a town located in the province of Soum in Burkina Faso. It has a population of 4,977.

== Transportation ==
The closest international airport to Silgadji is the Ouagadougou Airport located 164 km away.

== History ==
On 25 January 2020, 39 people were killed in Silgadji by armed jihadists. Victims were told to separate into two groups by gender and then told to "convert to Islam or die".

On 5 September 2022, a bus outside of Silgadji was traveling from Djibo to Ouagadougou when it hit a mine, killing 35 people and injuring 37 others. The victims were mainly traders and students returning to the capital. The perpetrators of the attack are unknown.
