= Pétéga =

City in Burkina Faso

- City
- Location within Burkina Faso
- Coordinates: 14°17′49″N 1°41′7″W
- Country: Burkina Faso
- Region: Sahel Region
- Province: Soum
- Department: Nassoumbou Department

Population (2003)
  - Total: 1,463
- Time zone: UTC+0 (GMT)

Pétéga is a village situated in the Nassoumbou Department in the province of Soum.

== History ==
On March 22, 2017, a leader of Ansar ul Islam, Harouna Dicko, was killed in Pétéga by Burkina Fasan security forces.
