= Boubacari Dicko =

Burkinabe politician (1955–2025)

Emir of Djibo
- Reign: 27 July 1987 – 19 November 2025
- Predecessor: Dicko Amadou Manga

National Assembly representative of Soum Province
- In office 1992–?
- President: Blaise Compaoré
- Born: July 1955; Djibo, French Upper Volta
- Died: 19 November 2025 (aged 70); Ouagadougou, Burkina Faso
- Burial: Djibo
- House: House of Djibo (Jelgobe branch)
- Father: Dicko Amadou Manga
- Religion: Sunni Islam (Qadiriyya)

Boubacari Dicko (July 1955 – 19 November 2025) was a Burkinabe politician who was the emir of Djibo from 1987 to his death, a National Assembly representative for Burkina Faso's Soum Province, and a member of the Burkina Faso's Constitutional Commission of 1991. His emirate was non-sovereign, but served an important traditional and religious role for Djibo's Fulani community.

== Biography ==
=== Early life and political career ===
Boubacari Dicko was born to Dicko Amadou Manga (r. 1952–1984), emir of Djibo, in July 1955. The emirate of Djibo is a traditional Fulani monarchy, and one of the three great emirates of the Soum Province. Established around the 18th century, the emirate has been traditionally ruled by a royal family known as the House of Djibo which is a branch of the Jelgobe noble lineage. All Jelgobe are traditionally given the praise name Dicko. After his father's death in 1984, Boubacari Dicko was enthroned on 27 July 1987; he was aged 32 at the time. In his role as the emir, he served as traditional and religious leader and often mediated in disputes. He became known for promoting peace and social cohesion in Djibo, and was fairly popular among his subjects. In terms of religion, his emirate was aligned with the Qadiri Order (Qadiriyya) of Sunni Islam which dominated Djibo.

Boubacari Dicko was part of the Constitutional Commission which drafted the 1991 constitution of Burkina Faso. He and other non-sovereign monarchs (such as Ouédraogo Nobila, Christophe of Téma, and Sanon Siaka of Houet) served as representatives of the traditional chiefs in the commission. In 1992, he was elected to represent Soum Province in the National Assembly, though generally preferred to stay in his hometown. Boubacari Dicko's younger brother eventually became Djibo's deputy major as a member of the Congress for Democracy and Progress.

=== Islamist insurgency ===
In 2009, a preacher named Ibrahim Malam Dicko became active in Djibo; though initially peaceful, his sermons denounced social inequalities and the traditional elites of the city. Ibrahim Malam Dicko became radicalized in 2015, starting to advocate militant activism and eventually open violence. Concluding that the preacher had crossed a line, Boubacari Dicko summoned Ibrahim Malam Dicko to appear before the emirate's council. The council questioned the militant and eventually presented him with two options: Cease his attacks on the establishment or be banned from preaching in Djibo. Ibrahim Malam Dicko remained committed to his radical views, whereupon he was publicly denounced by the emir and Djibo's Grand Imam. Ibrahim Malam Dicko subsequently became an insurgent, founded Ansarul Islam, and became one of the leaders of the Islamist insurgency in Burkina Faso.

In March 2021, Boubacari Dicko expressed scepticism about truces signed between Islamist rebels and the Burkinabe government, arguing that "a truce is nothing; it doesn't mean anything. Truces are signed everywhere, but things resume." At this point, rebels had largely overran Soum Province, with Djibo serving as the last local pro-government stronghold. As the Islamist uprising escalated, the rebels eventually put Djibo under siege. Efforts were made to resolve the siege through negotiations. In April 2022, the emir, his advisors and other local dignitaries met with Ansarul Islam commanders near the town, as the insurgents preferred to negotiate with these individuals rather than regular government officials. Yet the talks did not result in an end of the siege. In 2023, Boubacari Dicko expressed the belief that a continued partnership between France and Burkina Faso could be benefitial, yet cautioned that changes to this partnership were "necessary" as French military support had not prevented the rise of jihadism in Burkina Faso.

=== Exile and death ===
As the siege of Djibo progressed, rebels declared their intention to kill the emir. Boubacari Dicko thus began to leave Djibo more often for the first time in his life. He started to mainly live in the Burkinabe capital of Ouagadougou, where he was also attended by a medical team due to his declining health. He continued to involve himself in Djibo's community affairs from Ouagadougou.

Aged 70, Boubacari Dicko died of an illness at a hospital in Ouagadougou on 19 November 2025. He was widely mourned at his community, and the Burkinabe government praised him as a great mediator and upholder of traditions. His remains were flown with a helicopter to Djibo and buried next to his father and grandfather at the local royal royal courtyard on 20 November. The burial itself took place in a private family ceremony, but many locals later came to pay their last respects.

== Personal life ==
By the time of his death, Boubacari Dicko had a wife, three daughters, four sons, and several grandchildren.

== See also ==
- List of current non-sovereign African monarchs
