= Ouahigouya ambush =

- Part of the Jihadist insurgency in Burkina Faso
Date	February 7–8, 2022
Location	Ouahigouya Department, Burkina Faso
Result	French victory

Belligerents
France: Operation Barkhane	Ansarul Islam

Casualties and losses
None	10 killed
- 4 civilians killed

The Ouahigouya ambush took place near Ouahigouya, Burkina Faso, between February 7 and 8, 2022. French forces launched an airstrike on Ansar ul Islam militants responsible for the November Inata attack that killed dozens of Burkinabe police officers.

== Prelude ==
In 2021, Ansar ul Islam, a jihadist militant group active in northern Burkina Faso with ties to the Islamic State, attacked a police outpost in Inata, killing nearly 50 officers and four civilians. The attack, which was the deadliest of the jihadist insurgency in Burkina Faso at that point, was a key reason for the January 2022 Burkina Faso coup d'état. Following the attack, France's Operation Barkhane, which combatted jihadists in Burkina Faso, launched raids against suspected perpetrators of the Inata attack.

== Battle ==
The battle began on February 7, when French forces launched airstrikes on Ansarul Islam positions near the town of Ouahigouya. A group of French commandos then attacked an encampment where many jihadists were located, and opened fire on it. In the attack, ten jihadists were killed, and four civilians hiding in the camp were killed in the crossfire. The French government also stated that the ten jihadists killed were involved in carrying out the November Inata attack.

== Aftermath ==
Following the ambush, Burkinabe junta leader Paul-Henri Sandaogo Damiba visited Ouahigouya on a surprise visit on February 15. Later, on February 20, Damiba announced the expulsion of Barkhane troops from Burkina Faso, stating that they were looking for other partners to combat the insurgency. The Ouahigouya ambush was one of the last French operations of Operation Barkhane in Burkina Faso.
