= Djaffar Dicko =

Burkinabe jihadist

- Born: Amadou Boucary or Abdoul Salam Dicko; 1972 or 1980; Pétéga or Soboulé, Nassoumbou, Soum Province, Burkina Faso
- Relatives: Ibrahim Malam Dicko (older brother); Mansour Dicko (brother)
- Military career
- Allegiance: Ansarul Islam (2015–present)
- Rank: Head executioner (2015–2017); Emir (2017–present)
- Nickname: Yéro

Amadou Boucary, nom de guerre Djaffar Dicko and Yéro, is a Burkinabe jihadist who has served as the leader of Ansarul Islam since 2017.

== Biography ==
Dicko was born as Amadou Boucary or Abdoul Salam Dicko in 1972 or 1980 in either Soboule or Pétéga, Burkina Faso and is the younger brother of Ansarul Islam founder Ibrahim Malam Dicko. He attended a Koranic school, and is reportedly very technology-savvy, and is addicted to online jihadist organizations and social media platforms. Dicko also had two wives and five children as of 2017. Dicko's first roles in Ansarul Islam was as the third-in-command of the group, carrying out executions. He was also close with Katiba Macina founder Amadou Koufa, and maintained ideological and operational links with Koufa. These contacts with Koufa led Dicko and his older brother to pledge allegiance to Al-Qaeda. Following the deaths of his brothers Ibrahim Malam and Mansour in May 2017, Dicko assumed command of Ansarul Islam.

In negotiations with the Burkinabe government of Roch Marc Christian Kaboré in 2020, Dicko and Ansarul Islam received an undisclosed sum of money that allowed Dicko to expand Ansarul Islam's capabilities. Dicko also came in contact with Jama'at Nasr al-Islam wal Muslimin leader Iyad Ag Ghaly, and Ghaly allegedly let Dicko's group remain independent of JNIM to diminish Koufa's prominence in JNIM. On April 1, 2023, the Burkinabe junta claimed that Dicko had been killed in drone strikes against hundreds of Ansarul Islam and JNIM fighters in Djibo Department, Burkina Faso. The rumors of Dicko's death turned out to be untrue, although a large number of jihadists were killed.

The United States government imposed sanctions on Dicko and JNIM second-in-command Sidane Ag Hitta on April 23, 2024, for the kidnapping of American nationals. Dicko has been described by Burkinabe security sources as brutal and not charismatic. During clashes with the Islamic State in the Greater Sahara in the past, Dicko had executed several ISGS commanders and enlisted the remaining fighters.
