= 2022 Gaskinde attack =

2022 terrorist attack in Burkina Faso

- Part of Jihadist insurgency in Burkina Faso
- Location: Gaskinde, Soum Province, Burkina Faso
- Date: September 26, 2022
- Deaths: 37: 27 soldiers killed; 10 civilians killed
- Perpetrator: Jama'at Nasr al-Islam wal Muslimin

On September 26, 2022, a convoy bound for the besieged city of Djibo in northern Burkina Faso was attacked by armed gunmen, killing 27 soldiers and 10 civilians. The Mali-based jihadist group Jama'at Nasr al-Islam wal Muslimin (JNIM) claimed responsibility for the attack. The Gaskinde attack was a key reason for the September 30 coup in Burkina Faso, as many frontline officers were disgruntled about Paul-Henri Sandaogo Damiba's handling of the jihadist insurgency.

== Prelude ==
Since 2015, northern Burkina Faso has been embroiled in a jihadist insurgency after Mali-based jihadist groups such as Islamic State in the Greater Sahara, JNIM, and Al-Mourabitoun. Soum Province, and its capital city of Djibo, have been at the forefront of the insurgency, and as it escalated in early 2022, jihadist groups laid siege to the city and forced Burkinabe troops and civilians to use only one road to get in or out. This road has been the scene of multiple bombings, attacks, and ambushes by jihadist groups against civilians and soldiers, most notably on September 5, 2022, when a bus carrying students from Djibo to Ouagadougou was bombed, killing 35 people and injuring 37 more.

== Attack ==
Prior to the attack, Djibo had not seen a supply convoy enter for 40 days, according to the local transportation union. The most recent resupply was on September 20, when a helicopter airlifted 70 tons of food into the town. As the Burkinabe convoy was traveling towards Djibo, the 150 vehicles were ambushed by militants near Gaskinde. Initially, the Burkinabe government claimed the death toll was 11 soldiers killed, 28 wounded, and 50 civilians and soldiers missing. Online videos showed at least a dozen blazing trucks, some including military vehicles. Parts of the convoy however, did make it into Djibo, as evidenced by other videos that showed crowds cheering on some of the videos.

== Aftermath ==
After the attack, Jama'at Nasr al-Islam wal Muslimin claimed responsibility.

The Gaskinde attack was the last major militant attack under Paul-Henri Sandaogo Damiba's regime, as due to the worsening security situation under his regime, captain Ibrahim Traoré overthrew the Burkinabe government, with the Gaskinde attack partially as the casus belli.
