= 2018 Inata attack =

Attacks in Burkina Faso

- Part of Jihadist insurgency in Burkina Faso
Date	October 3–4, 2018
Location	Inata, Soum Province, Burkina Faso
Result	Franco-Burkinabe victory

Belligerents
Burkina Faso; France	Ansarul Islam

Strength
Unknown	40

Casualties and losses
1 killed 1 injured	7+ killed

The 2018 Inata attack occurred between October 3 and 4, 2018, when suspected militants from Ansarul Islam attacked the gold mines near Inata, Burkina Faso, but were repulsed by Burkinabe forces.

== Background ==
Since 2017, Islamist militant groups such as Jama'at Nasr al-Islam wal-Muslimin, Islamic State in the Greater Sahara, and the homegrown Ansarul Islam have been active in northern Burkina Faso's Soum Province, on the Malian and Nigerien borders. The town of Inata is known for its productive gold mines, and is located in Soum. On September 23, three foreign nationals were kidnapped by militants at the mines.

== Attack ==
Militants attacked an outpost of the Burkinabe gendarmerie in Inata at 8:50 p.m, close to the mines. Around forty men participated in the attack, riding on six motorcycles and two pickups. Burkinabe soldiers stated that the militants were heavily armed. The attackers destroyed several vehicles at the gold mine, and raided the dormitories of civilian miners and staff.

Burkinabe authorities alerted French airplanes of Operation Barkhane and asked them to intervene. French officials then directed a MQ-9 drone to the area along with two Mirage 2000 planes and a C-135 fueling plane that took off from Niamey. The drone spotted a column of several motorcycles headed north from Inata towards the Malian border, and carried out an airstrike against them that night.

== Aftermath ==
The Burkinabe Ministry of Defense stated that one soldier was killed and one was injured in the attack, and ten militants had been killed or injured. On October 5, the Burkinabe Chief of Staff clarified that seven militants were killed, and that aerial reconnaissance reported that at least seven bodies were at the site of the airstrike.

== Responsibility ==
No group claimed responsibility for the attack, although Ansarul Islam was suspected due to being active in the area of Inata.
