= Dolmane gold mine attack =

2019 terrorist attack in Soum Province, Burkina Faso

Dolmané gold mine attack
- Part of the Islamist insurgency in Burkina Faso
- Location: Madouji, Arbinda Department, Soum Province, Burkina Faso
- Date: 4 October 2019
- Target: Mineworkers
- Attack type: Shooting
- Deaths: 20
- Injuries: Unknown
- Perpetrator: Islamic State's West Africa Province or al-Qaeda in the Islamic Maghreb (suspected)

The Dolmané gold mine attack occurred on 4 October 2019 near Madouji, Arbinda Department, Soum Province, Burkina Faso. The Dolmané gold mining site was attacked by suspected Islamic terrorists. The attack took place not far from where a bridge linking two northern towns was blown up in mid-September. At least 20 persons, mostly people that worked in the gold mine, were killed and an unknown number of people were injured. Both Islamic State and al-Qaeda have affiliated groups in the region. It is unknown which of the two was responsible for this attack.

Burkina Faso is one of the biggest gold producers in Africa. Attacks against gold mines are causing a drop in the production of gold in the country. The goal of this attack was not only to terrorize, but also to damage the local economy.

== Background ==
In the aftermath of the 2011 Libyan Civil War, militant attacks have increased due to a large influx of weapons and fighters into the region. Neighbouring Mali faced conflict in Azawad that threatened to split the country.

Burkina Faso also faced an uprising in 2014 leading to the downfall of President Blaise Compaoré later that year. Burkina Faso is a member of the Trans-Saharan Counterterrorism Partnership and its commitment of peacekeeping troops in Mali and Sudan has made it a target for extremists in the region. Until 2015, Burkina Faso had remained violence free despite violent events occurring in the northern neighbouring countries of Mali and Niger. Since then, jihadist groups linked to Al-Qaeda and Islamic State began their infiltration into the country from the northern borders followed by its eastern borders. The infiltration have also brought danger to the southern and western borders. Since 2015, Burkina Faso has faced cross-border attacks and sporadic raids in its territory, the result of instability and unrest in neighboring countries.

Several major attacks have occurred in the capital Ouagadougou in recent years: In 2016, attacks on a hotel and restaurant killed 30 people, including foreigners; and in 2017, similar attacks killed 19 people, including foreigners. Both of these attacks were carried out by Al-Qaeda in the Islamic Maghreb. On 2 March 2018, at least eight heavily armed militants launched an assault on key locations throughout Ouagadougou, the capital city of Burkina Faso. Targets included the French embassy and the headquarters of Burkina Faso's military. 16 people, including the eight attackers died in the incident that left 85 injured.

In the year 2019, the ethnic and religious tensions started due to the Islamist insurgency in Burkina Faso. The effect was more prominent in the northern areas of Burkina Faso bordering Mali. AFP reported that the Insurgents have combined hit-and-run tactics of guerrilla warfare along with the road side land mines and suicide bombings. Using these tactics, the insurgents have killed about 600 people. However the toll is estimated to be more than 1,000 by the civil society groups. AFP reported that the violence have displaced around 300,000 people and around 3000 schools were closed. The country's economy is largely rural and effect of violence is increasing on the economy. The violence has been causing disruption in the trade and markets.

== Attack ==
The attack occurred on 4 October 2019 near Madouji, Arbinda Department, Soum Province, Burkina Faso. The Dolmané gold mining site was attacked by suspected Islamic terrorists. The attack took place not far from where a bridge linking two northern towns was blown up in mid-September. At least 20 persons, mostly people that worked in the gold mine, were killed and an unknown number of people were injured. Both Islamic State and al-Qaeda have affiliated groups in the region. It is unknown which of the two was responsible for this attack. Burkina Faso is one of the biggest gold producers in Africa. Attacks against gold mines are causing a drop in the production of gold in the country. The goal of this attack was not only to terror, but also to damage the local economy.

== See also ==
- Gold mining in Burkina Faso
