= Battle of the Foulsaré Forest =

2017 battle of the Mali War

- Part of Mali War
Date	April 29–30, 2017
Location	Foulsaré forest, Burkina Faso-Mali border
Result	French victory

Belligerents
Operation Barkhane: 27th Mountain Infantry Brigade	Ansarul Islam; Jama'at Nasr al-Islam wal Muslimin

Commanders and leaders
Unknown	Ibrahim Malam Dicko †

Casualties and losses
None	20 killed or injured

Between April 29 and 30, 2017, French forces launched an offensive against jihadists from Ansarul Islam and Jama'at Nasr al-Islam wal Muslimin based in the Foulsaré forest in southern Mali. The operation was dubbed Operation Bayard by the French.

== Background ==
Between March 27 and April 10, an operation dubbed "Panga" was carried out by 1,300 Malian, Burkinabe, and French forces in the Foulsaré forest, also known as the Fhero forest, south of Hombori on the Burkinabe-Malian border. A French soldier was killed in this operation on April 5, in an attack claimed by JNIM. In twelve days of searches, two jihadists were killed, eight were taken prisoner, and between several dozen and 200 suspects were arrested. The intelligence gathered during Operation Panga led French forces to conduct the attack on the Foulsaré forest. The forest is considered a sanctuary of Ansarul Islam, the Burkinabe jihadist group, and the intelligence showed that JNIM was recently trying to gain a foothold in the area and form an alliance with Ansarul Islam.

== Battle ==
French forces launched the offensive on April 29. A group of jihadists was spotted by French Mirage 2000s, and subsequently shot at by Tigers and a Cayman which deployed French commandos from the 27th Mountain Infantry Brigade. The helicopters and commandos pursued the jihadists, who did not put up a fight and instead broke up into various groups carrying their dead and wounded. At the end of the night, mine clearance teams and more commandos were airlifted to the site. French soldiers began combing the area around 5:30am. A skirmish broke out between jihadist remnants and French forces, but the jihadists quickly fled. French forces withdrew by the end of the day.

== Aftermath ==
By daybreak, twenty jihadists were either killed or injured, according to the French army. One of the jihadists present during the battle was Ibrahim Malam Dicko, the leader of Ansarul Islam, who was targeted by French helicopters. He managed to flee the battle, although died several days later due to his diabetes. Burkinabe military sources stated his death was practically certain. Le Monde reported that a member of Dicko's entourage stated he died of exhaustion after the battle, and had no trace of injury on his body. Following the raid, he had no food and resources, and was buried where he laid.
