= ACMAT Bastion =

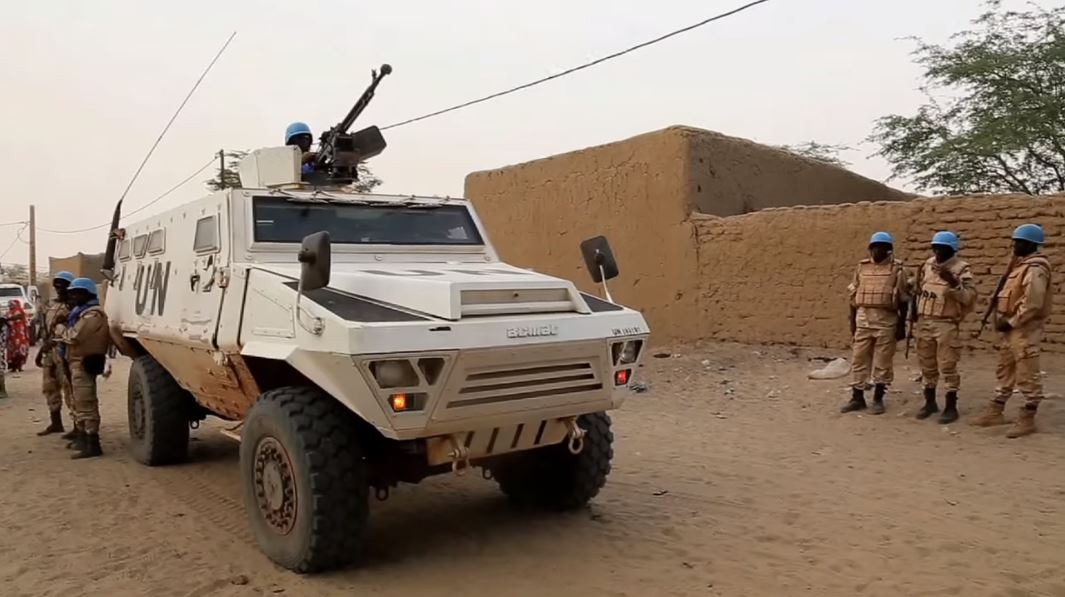
- A MINUSMA Bastion APC in Northern Mali, 2015
- Type: Armoured personnel carrier
- Place of origin: France

Service history
- In service: 2012–present
- Wars: Insurgency in the Sahel; Somali Civil War; 2015 offensive against Boko Haram; Yemeni Civil War; 2019 Gabon Coup D'etat

Production history
- Designer: ACMAT
- Manufacturer: ACMAT (Former, France); Renault Truck Defense (Former, France); Arquus (Current, France); MACK Defense (Former, USA); AM General (Current, USA)
- Variants: Bastion; PATSAS; Fortress

Specifications
- Mass: 12,000 kilograms (26,000 lb)
- Length: 6 m (19 ft 8 in)
- Width: 2.2 m (7 ft 3 in)
- Height: 2.4 m (7 ft 10 in)
- Crew: 2
- Passengers: 8–10
- Armour: STANAG 4569 level 1 to level 3
- Main armament: 7.62 mm or 12.7 mm ring or remote control turret
- Engine: 180 hp (130 kW; 180 PS); 450 pound-feet (610 N⋅m)
- Suspension: wheeled
- Operational range: 1,400 km (870 mi)
- Maximum speed: 110 km/h (68 mph)

The ACMAT Bastion is a modern French armoured personnel carrier, manufactured by ACMAT.

The Bastion was available to customers in North America and Oceania via Mack Defense. As of 2021, AM General is making the Bastion.

== Design ==
Its chassis is based on the ACMAT VLRA. In 2018, Arquus, owner of ACMAT, signed a contract with AM General to propose the Bastion as an armored ambulance for the U.S. Army.

=== Bastion PATSAS ===
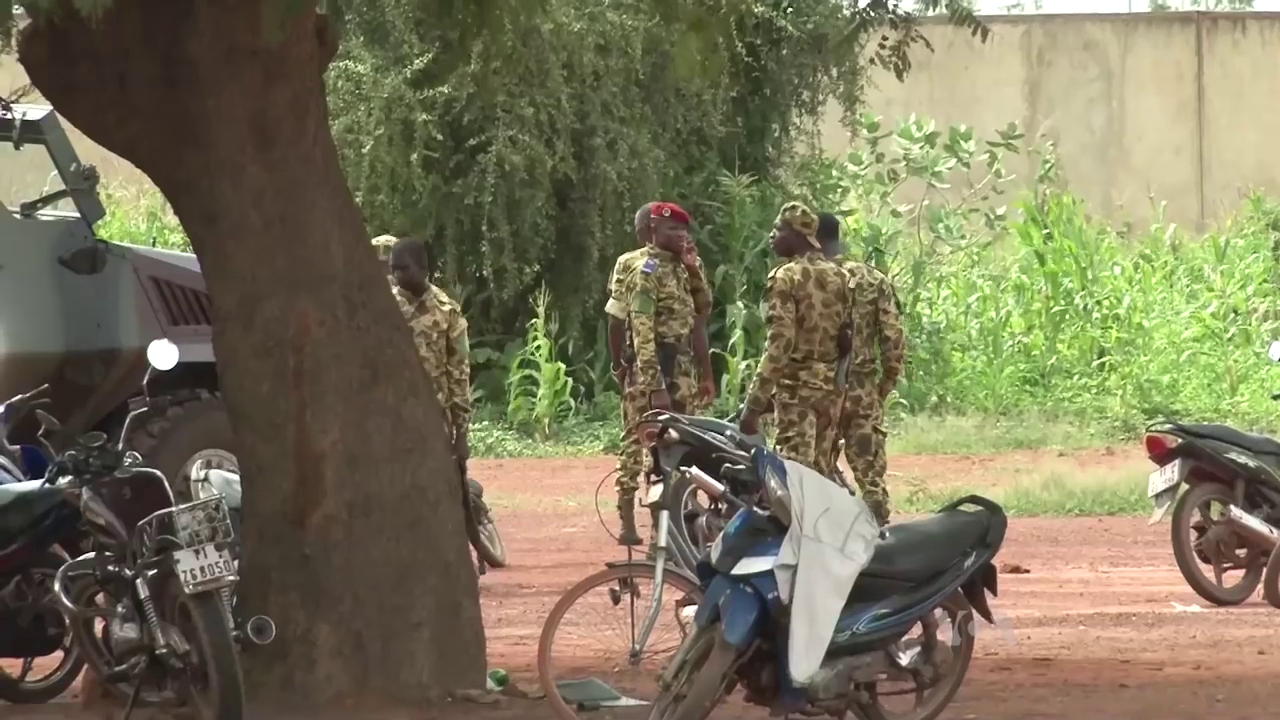
A Bastion PATSAS of the Regiment of Presidential Security (left) during the 2015 Burkinabé coup d'état.

The Bastion PATSAS (PATrouille SAS) is a variant designed for special forces. It is lighter (10 tonnes) and carries 5 equipped soldiers. It is armed with a 12.7mm heavy machine gun and can carry 3 additional medium machine guns.

=== Fortress ===
The Fortress, formerly Bastion HM (High Mobility), is an up-armored Bastion, with a more powerful motor (340 hp) and an independent suspension to improve its mobility. It exists in two versions, APC and armored logistic vehicle.

== Service history ==
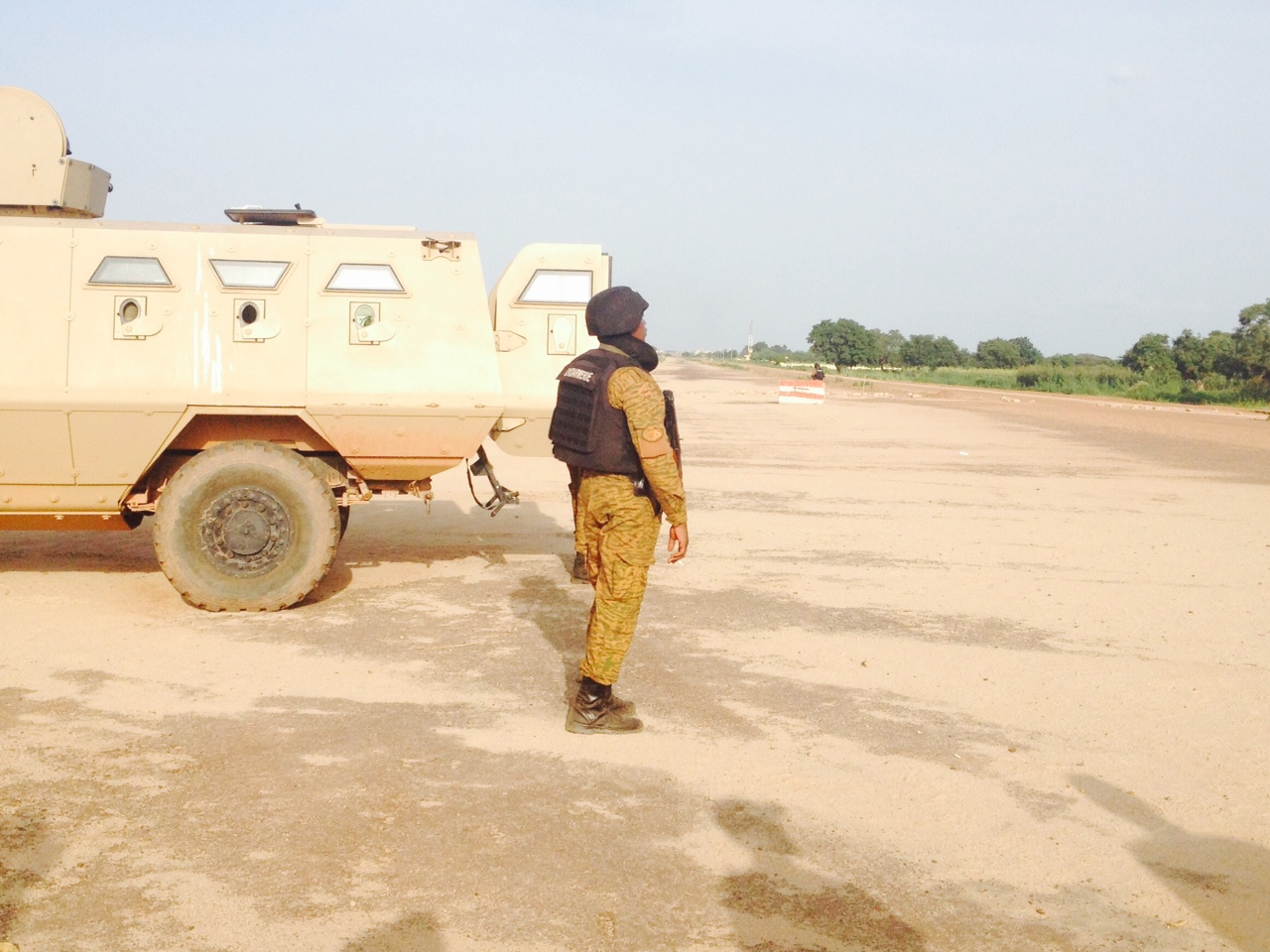
A Bastion APC of the loyalist National Gendarmerie during the 2015 Burkinabé coup d'état.

=== West Africa ===
The Chadian détachement d'action rapide (rapid action detachment) used the Bastion PATSAS during the 2013 intervention in Mali. The Chadian Army also fielded Bastions during the 2015 intervention against Boko Haram in Far North Cameroon and Nigeria.

The Cameroonian Bastion APCs, nicknamed as Cyclones, have been deployed in Northern Cameroon with the Rapid Intervention Brigade.

Burkina Faso deployed its Bastions in peacekeeping operations in Northern Mali, under the MINUSMA banner. They have also been used in internal security missions, Bastion PATSAS being for instance fielded by the regiment de sécurité présidentielle before its disbandment in 2015. One Bastion was destroyed by Ansar ul Islam in the 2016 Nassoumbou attack.

In Mali, the 134th Escadron de Reconnaissance (Recce Squadron) was trained to operate the Bastion APC by the EUTM Mali.

=== East Africa ===
In 2015, the United States Department of Defense bought 62 Bastion APC variants commercialised by Mack Trucks to supply various African forces, some of them, such as Uganda, being involved in AMISOM.

=== Arabian Peninsula ===
Some of the Saudi Arabian Bastion PATSAS were reportedly used in the intervention in Yemen.

== Operators ==
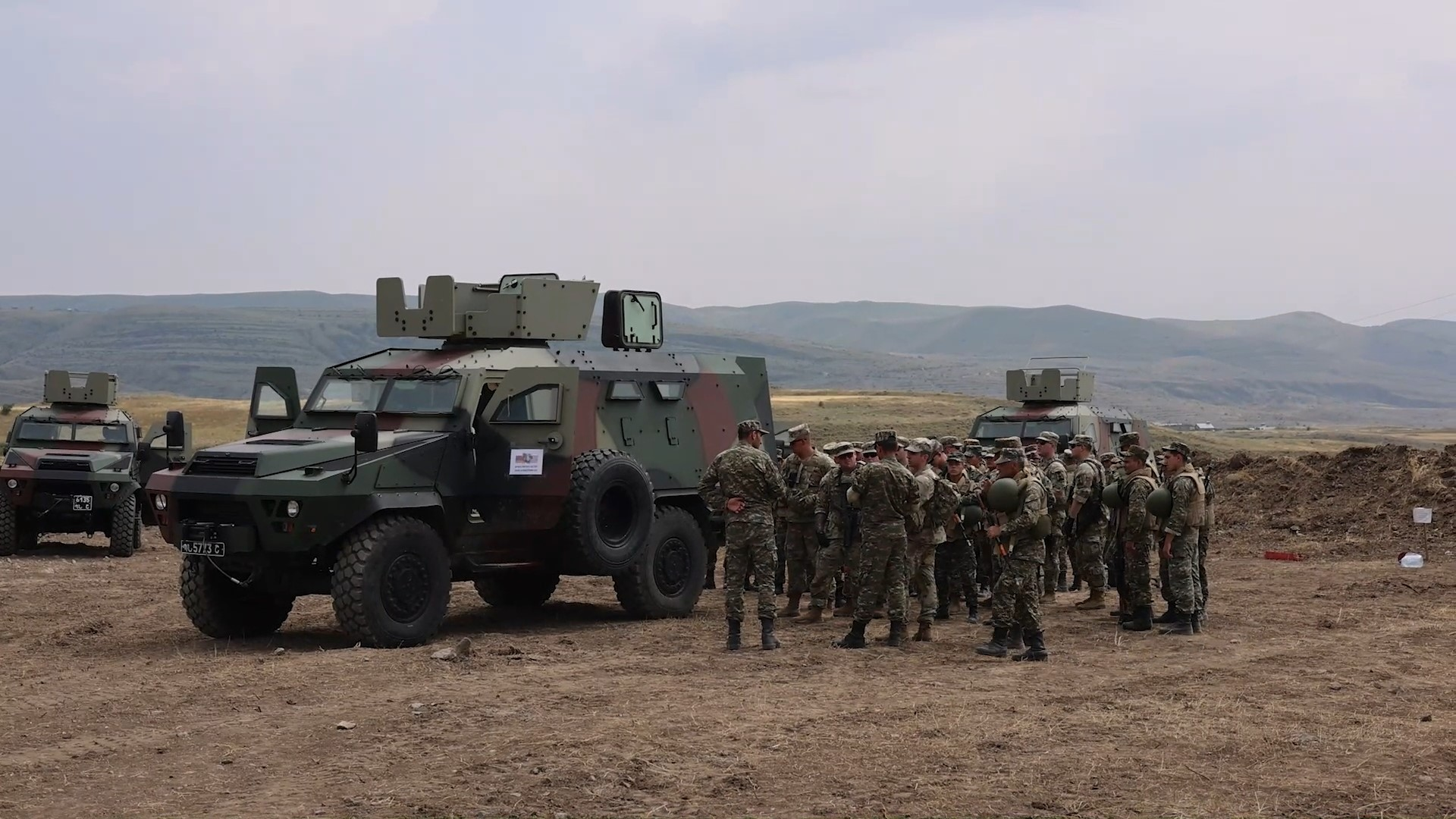
Several Bastion APCs during the Eagle Partner joint Armenia-U.S. exercise in July 2024

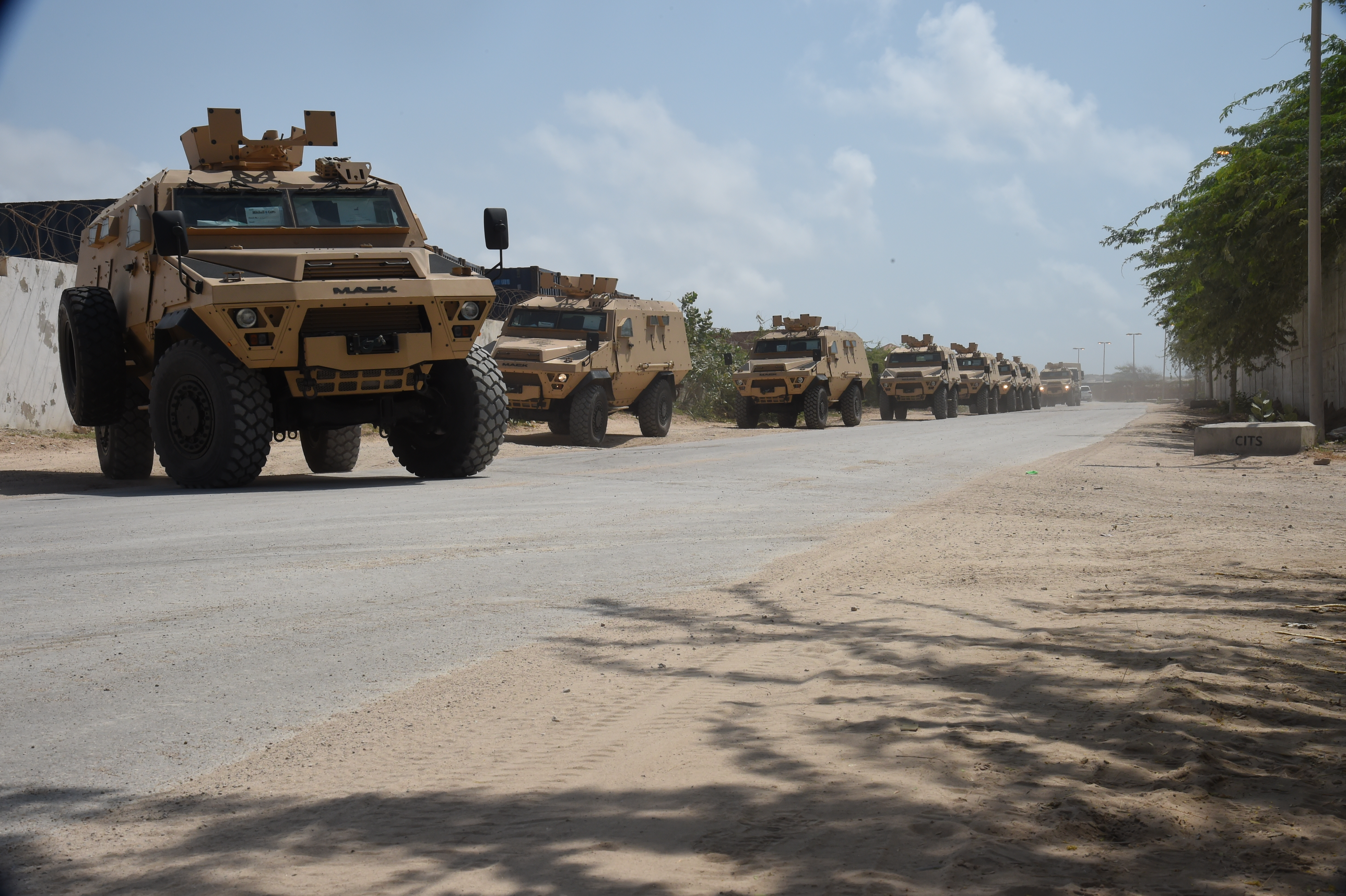
Mack Bastion APCs being delivered to the Ugandan contingent of the AMISOM, 2017.

- Armenia – 50 Bastion APCs (24 delivered in November 2023 with 26 in production).
- Burkina Faso – 10 Bastions received in 2012. At least 8 Bastion PATSAS and some Bastion APCs in service. More than 100 in service according to Jane's.
- Cameroon – 23 Bastion APCs received in 2015–2016, supplied via U.S. DoD. 15 Bastions received in late 2017.
- Congo-Brazzaville – Two Bastions acquired for the National Police.
- Chad – 22 Bastion PATSAS received in 2013.
- Chile – 7 Bastion 4x4 in 2024 for police use (Carabineros de Chile)
- Ethiopia – 12 Bastion APCs received in 2016, supplied via U.S. DoD. In 2018, an industry source explained to Jane's that none have actually been supplied.
- Gabon – 5 Bastion APCs.
- Ivory Coast – at least 9 Bastions in 2018.
- Kenya – 12 Bastion APCs received in 2018, supplied via U.S. DoD.
- Kosovo – 3 Bastion APCs have been seen used by Kosovo Police, provided by AM General.
- Mali – 5 Bastion APCs received in 2016 for the Malian military.
- Saudi Arabia – 71 Bastion PATSAS received in 2016. Used by Saudi special forces units.
- Senegal – 36 Bastion APCs and 2 PATSAS, 7 were bought in December 2017 by the Senegalese Gendarmerie for riot control. An additional 29 were procured in 2019 for the Army with financial aid from Saudi Arabia.
- Somalia – 13 Bastion APCs received in 2016, supplied via U.S. DoD. In 2018, an industry source explained to Jane's that none have actually been supplied.
- Sweden – some Bastion HMs supplied from 2016, used by the Särskilda operationsgruppen. Also used by Swedish police after their Plasan Sandcat vehicles were replaced.
- Tanzania – several dozens of Bastion APCS leased from the UN for peacekeeping missions.
- Togo – 30 Bastion PATSAS received in 2014 for the Togolese military.
- Tunisia – 4 Bastion APCs received in 2016, supplied via U.S. DoD.
- Uganda – 19 Bastion APCs received in 2017, supplied via U.S. DoD. A total of 31 have been reportedly supplied.
- Ukraine − 11 delivered and 50 on order as of August 2025.

=== Evaluation only ===
- France – Bastion PATSAS evaluated by the French special forces.
