= Ibrahim Malam Dicko =

Burkinabè jihadist (1970–2017)

- Born: Boureima Dicko; 1970; Soboulé, Soum Province, Upper Volta
- Died: 2 May 2017 (aged 46–47); Foulsaré Forest, Burkinabe-Malian border
- Military career
- Allegiance: Katiba Macina (2015–2016); Ansar Dine (2015–2016); Ansarul Islam (2016–2017)
- Rank: Emir
- Known for: Founder of Ansarul Islam
- Conflicts: Mali War Jihadist insurgency in Burkina Faso: 2016 Nassoumbou attack; Battle of the Foulsaré Forest †

Boureima Dicko (1970 – 2 May 2017), nom de guerre Ibrahim Malam Dicko, was a Burkinabe jihadist and the founder of Ansarul Islam.

== Biography ==
=== Early life ===
Dicko was born in 1970 to a Fulani family from the commune of Soboulé, Soum Province, Upper Volta. He went to a regular school before entering a Quranic school in Burkina Faso, later studying abroad. He married the daughter of the Grand Imam in Djibo. Dicko began preaching in villages across Soum in 2009 and local radio stations. Gaining popularity, he founded an Islamic association named Al-Irchad and then founded a Quranic school in 2012. Dicko's earlier speeches did not preach extreme jihadism, instead advocating for equality between the Fulani and the Rimaïbé, the descendants of formerly-enslaved populations who later assimilated into the Fulani.

=== Mali War ===
In September 2013, Dicko was arrested along with twenty of his students by French forces of Operation Serval near Tessalit, Mali. Dicko had a bounty put on him for attempting to join Ansar Dine. He was handed over to Malian forces, and imprisoned in Bamako before being released in 2015. After his release, Dicko returned to Djibo and continued preaching in a mosque and on the radio. He was disowned by the Grand Imam of Djibo (his father-in-law) in early 2016, and forced to divorce his wife shortly afterward. The preacher was also dencounced by Boubacari Dicko, the emir of Djibo. He then took over leadership of Al-Irchad, but again left his role in summer 2016.

In 2015, Dicko attempted to join Katiba Macina led by increasingly-popular preacher Amadou Koufa. At the time, Katiba Macina had a small sleeper contingent of forty men in Soum Province of Burkina Faso. Koufa objected to a jihadist rebellion in Burkina Faso however, as he considered it premature and would disrupt supply lines of gas and food crucial to Katiba Macina's operations. Dicko, serving under Koufa, initially complied with these orders. A former member of Ansarul Islam testified that Dicko decided to spur a violent insurrection in Burkina Faso following Operation Ségueré in November 2016, where he saw Burkinabe soldiers publicly humiliating Fulani peasants.

=== Ansarul Islam ===
Ansarul Islam was founded in November 2016 in the Foulsaré forest, coming to prominence in a press release where they claimed responsibility for the 2016 Nassoumbou attack against the Burkinabe army. In the press release, Dicko called himself the "commander of believers" and "guide of Ansarul Islam". According to the International Crisis Group, Ansarul Islam was born from the stigmatization of different social groups and classes in northern Burkina Faso. Dicko called into question the "omnipotence of customary chiefdoms and the monopoly of religious authority held by maraboutic families, whom he accuses of enriching themselves at the expense of the populations." During his preaching years, Dicko had massive popularity among Burkinabe youth for these sentiments. While many of them rejected Dicko following his switch to armed insurgency, he kept a sizable number of followers to wage a low-intensity guerrilla campaign.

Despite maintaining close relations with Koufa, Dicko disagreed with Koufa's decision to merge into Jama'at Nasr al-Islam wal Muslimin.

=== Death ===
On June 27, 2017, the unofficial Facebook page of Ansarul Islam announced the instatement of Djaffar Dicko, Ibrahim Malam's brother, as head of Ansarul Islam. The post implied that Ibrahim Malam had been killed. Dicko had been present in the Foulsaré forest at the time of a French raid on May 2, in which he was targeted by French helicopters. A member of Dicko's entourage who was present during the raid stated that when Dicko ran off, he was weakened by his diabetes and without food and resources, he died of exhaustion shortly after the battle. Dicko was buried where he laid.
