= Douna drone strike =

2024 drone strike in Mali

- Part of Mali War
- Location: Douna, Douentza Cercle, Mali
- Date: March 22, 2024; 10pm
- Weapon: Bayraktar TB2
- Deaths: 14
- Injuries: 9
- Perpetrator: Malian Armed Forces

On the night between March 22 and 23, 2024, a Malian Army Bayraktar TB2 drone struck a madrasa in the village of Douna, Douentza Cercle, Mali, killing fourteen children and injuring nine others. The drone strike came several days after another strike in Amasrakad killed fourteen civilians.

== Background ==
The Douentza Cercle where Douna is located has been a hub for the Katiba Serma, a jihadist group that is part of Jama'at Nasr al-Islam wal Muslimin (JNIM). Douna itself is sometimes invaded by these jihadists, who are based in the Serma and Foulsare forests nearby. The forests were closed to the population of Douna a week prior to the drone strike due to a Malian Army operation in the area.

The Malian Army in recent months had also been launching indiscriminate drone strikes against civilian areas. On March 17, civilians in Amasrakad, Gao Region were hit by Malian drone strikes, killing 13 and injuring over a dozen others. In February, Malian drone strikes targeted a wedding in Konokassi killing five people, and then killed five more when a funeral service was held for the wedding victims.

== Drone strike ==
Most madrasas in the Dogon country have class very early in the morning and very late in the evening. For evening classes, a fire is often lit to illuminate the area. On March 22 at around 10pm, students were gathered around the fire when the drone strikes hit. Fourteen students were killed immediately, nine of whom were from the Ongoiba family. Two victims were from the Sawadogo family, and three were from the Maiga family. Nine injured students were brought to hospitals in Mopti and Sévaré.

== Aftermath ==
The drone strike and publication of photos of the victims stirred up controversy within the Malian government and army. JNIM condemned the attack in a March 25 press release and decried the use of Bayraktar TB2 drones. A day prior, the emir of JNIM in Burkina Faso Djaffar Dicko called on Turkish politicians to hat the sale of Bayraktar drones to the Sahelian governments.
