= Silgadji bus bombing =

2022 terrorist attack in Burkina Faso

- Part of Jihadist insurgency in Burkina Faso
- Location: near Silgadji, Burkina Faso
- Date: September 5, 2022
- Deaths: 35
- Injuries: 37
- Perpetrator: Unknown jihadist group

On September 5, 2022, a bus travelling from Djibo to the Burkinabe capital of Ouagadougou hit a mine outside the town of Silgadji, killing 35 people and injured dozens more.

== Prelude ==
Since 2015, northern Burkina Faso has been the hotbed of a jihadist insurgency, with much of the countryside being controlled by Islamist militants like Islamic State in the Greater Sahara. Throughout the years of fighting, key roads linking major cities have been mined by both the Burkinabe military and the jihadist groups, posing a major threat to civilians. The road between Djibo and Ouagadougou has especially been a target of mining since early 2022, when jihadists from Jama'at Nasr al-Islam wal Muslimin began a campaign to besiege the city. In August, a bombing and ambush on the road led to the death of 15 Burkinabe soldiers.

== Bombing ==
On September 5, the Burkinabe government launched a supply convoy to relieve civilians and soldiers at the ongoing siege of Djibo. One of the vehicles in the convoy, according to Sahel Region governor Rodolphe Sorgho, was carrying civilians at the time of the bombing. The convoy was bombed in between Djibo and the town of Bourzanga, in particular near the town of Silgadji. An anonymous resident of Silgadji speaking to AFP claimed many of the civilians were merchants looking to buy supplies and students returning to Ouagadougou for school.

After the attack, the Burkinabe government claimed to have secured the area around the road.
