= Inata, Burkina Faso =

Town in Soum, Burkina Faso

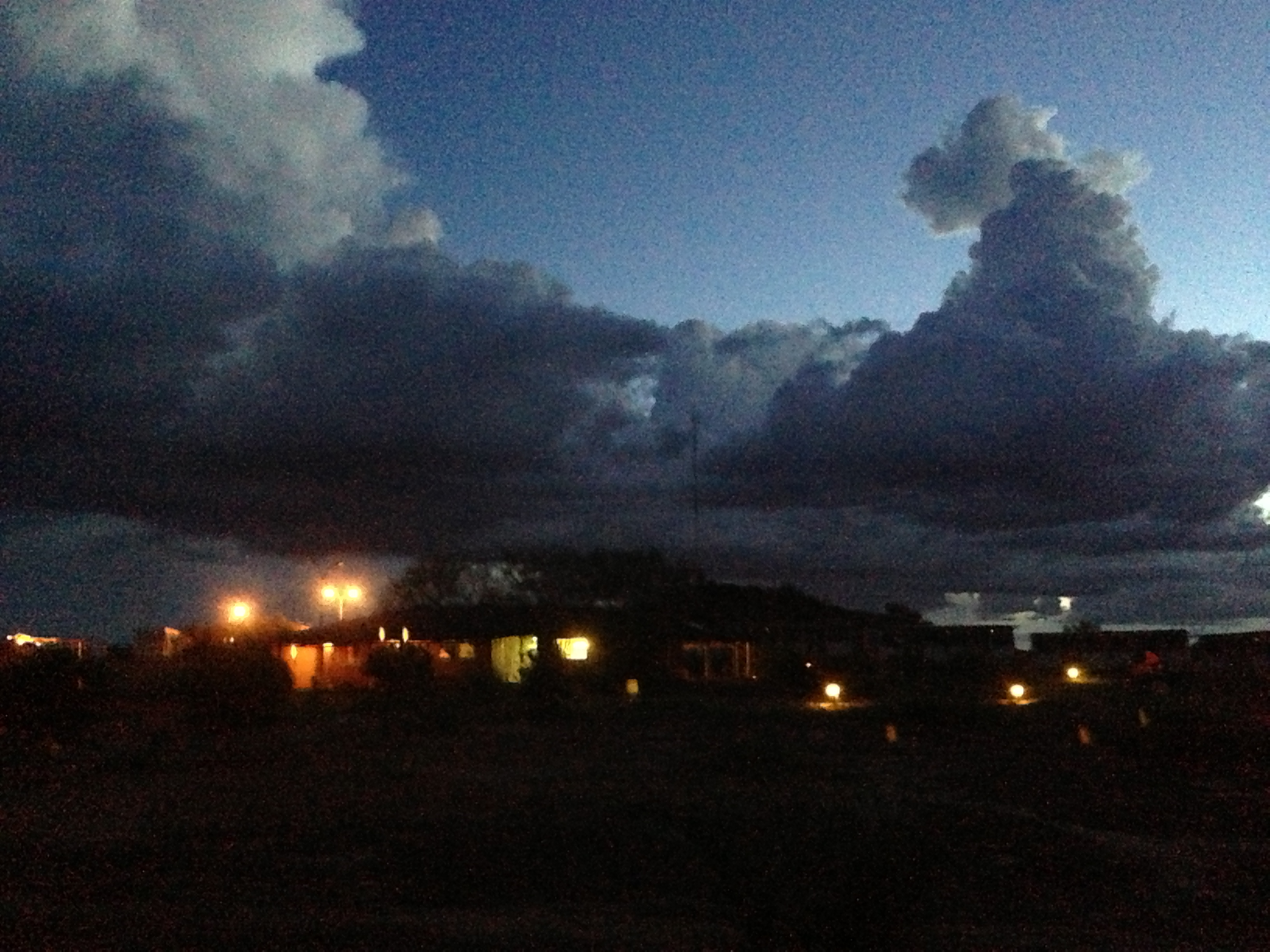
- Bar at the Inata Gold mine

- Location within Burkina Faso
- Coordinates: 14°20′12.8″N 1°19′30.7″W
- Country: Burkina Faso
- Province: Soum

Inata is a town in Soum Province, Burkina Faso. Inata is well known for its gold mine.

== History ==
In 2018, the mine and military base in Inata was attacked by Ansarul Islam, but the attack was repelled by French and Burkinabe forces. Three workers at the local gold mine, including two foreigners, were kidnapped in September 2018 by jihadist fighters. Both were eventually released in 2019.

It became famous for an attack on November 14, 2021 that killed 53 gendarmes and four civilians. The attack was one of the influencing factors in the January 2022 Burkina Faso coup d'état.

== See also ==
- Djibo, which is nearby
