= Diguel Department =

Coordinates: 14°26′06″N 1°53′00″W

Diguel
- Department
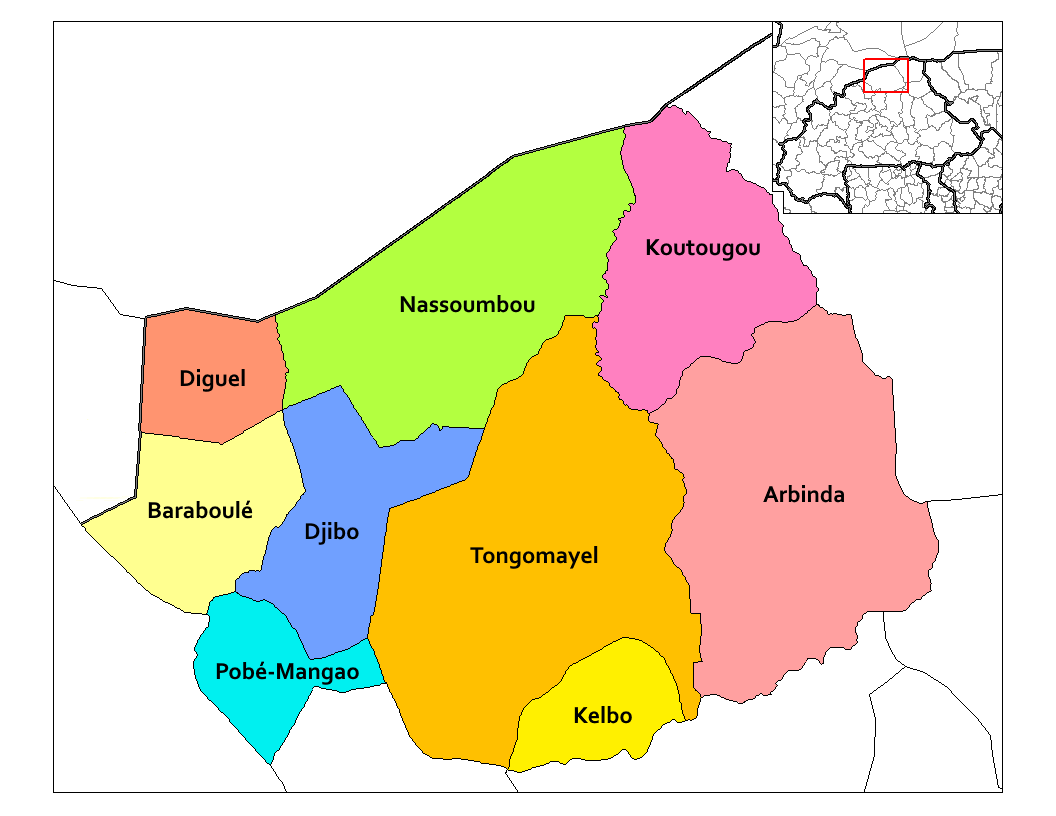
- Diguel Department location in the province
- Country: Burkina Faso
- Province: Soum Province
- Time zone: UTC+0 (GMT 0)

Diguel is a department or commune of Soum Province in north-western Burkina Faso. Its capital lies at the town of Diguel.
