= Nassoumbou attack =

Battle of the islamist insurgency in Burkina Faso on 16 December 2016

- Part of the Islamist insurgency in Burkina Faso
| Date | 16 December 2016 |
| Location | Nassoumbou, Soum Province, Burkina Faso |
| Result | Jihadist victory |

Belligerents
| Burkina Faso | Ansarul Islam; Islamic State in the Greater Sahara; Katiba Serma |

Strength
| 600 (before battle) | 28 (per Ansarul Islam) |

Casualties and losses
| 12 killed 4 wounded | 2 killed 1 wounded |

On 16 December 2016, jihadists from Ansarul Islam and the Islamic State in the Greater Sahara attacked a Burkinabe army outpost in Nassoumbou, Soum Province, Burkina Faso, killing twelve soldiers. The attack was the first claimed by Ansarul Islam, Burkina Faso's first homegrown jihadist movement that formed a month prior.

== Background ==
Since 2015, northern Burkina Faso's Soum Province has served as a rear base for jihadist groups such as Katiba Macina and the Islamic State in the Greater Sahara based in neighboring Mali and Niger. Burkinabe imam Ibrahim Malam Dicko had been fighting for years with Katiba Macina under the leadership of Amadou Koufa. Dicko opposed Koufa's idea of fomenting a jihadist insurrection, calling it too premature and disruptive to the fuel and supply pipelines to Malian jihadist groups that existed in Burkina Faso at the time. At the end of November 2016, Dicko changed his mind on an insurgency following the Burkinabe military's Operation Seguere, where Dicko had seen Fulani farmers humiliated and searched by the Burkinabe military. Ansarul Islam was formed shortly afterward in the Foulsare forest on the Malian-Burkinabe border.

== Attack ==
At about five in the morning on 16 December 2016, forty jihadists from Mali attacked the Burkinabe army military post in Nassoumbou. The soldiers attacked were part of the Anti-terrorist Armed Forces Group (GFAT), a mixed gendarmerie-army battalion of over 600 men who had been deployed to the Malian border in January 2013 at the end of Operation Serval. The Ansarul Islam jihadists were supported by a few men in Katiba Serma, a brigade affiliated with Katiba Macina. The International Crisis Group also stated that men from the Islamic State in the Greater Sahara participated in the attack. The jihadists attacked in a pick-up truck and six motorcycles, divided into three groups each equipped with a rocket launcher and a Kalashnikov.

Fighting lasted an hour and a half. Most of the Burkinabe soldiers fled at the onset of the attack; only about twenty fought back. A Bastion armored vehicle and several other vehicles were destroyed. The jihadists seized the camp and stole two vehicles as well as weapons and equipment before returning to Malian territory.

== Aftermath ==
Burkinabe President Roch Marc Christian Kaboré and Security Minister Simon Compaoré stated that twelve soldiers were killed and four were injured in the attack. The high commissioner of Soum Province, Mohammed Dah, stated that black jihad flags had been waved by the perpetrators during the attack.

The attack was claimed by Ansarul Islam on 26 December, officially announcing itself as a militant group. In their statement, Ansarul Islam claimed to have launched the assault with 28 fighters and claimed that two of their own fighters were killed and one injured, along with twenty Burkinabe soldiers killed and nine vehicles destroyed.
