= Pobe-Mengao Department =

Coordinates: 13.8997°N 1.7656°W

Pobe-Mengao
- Department
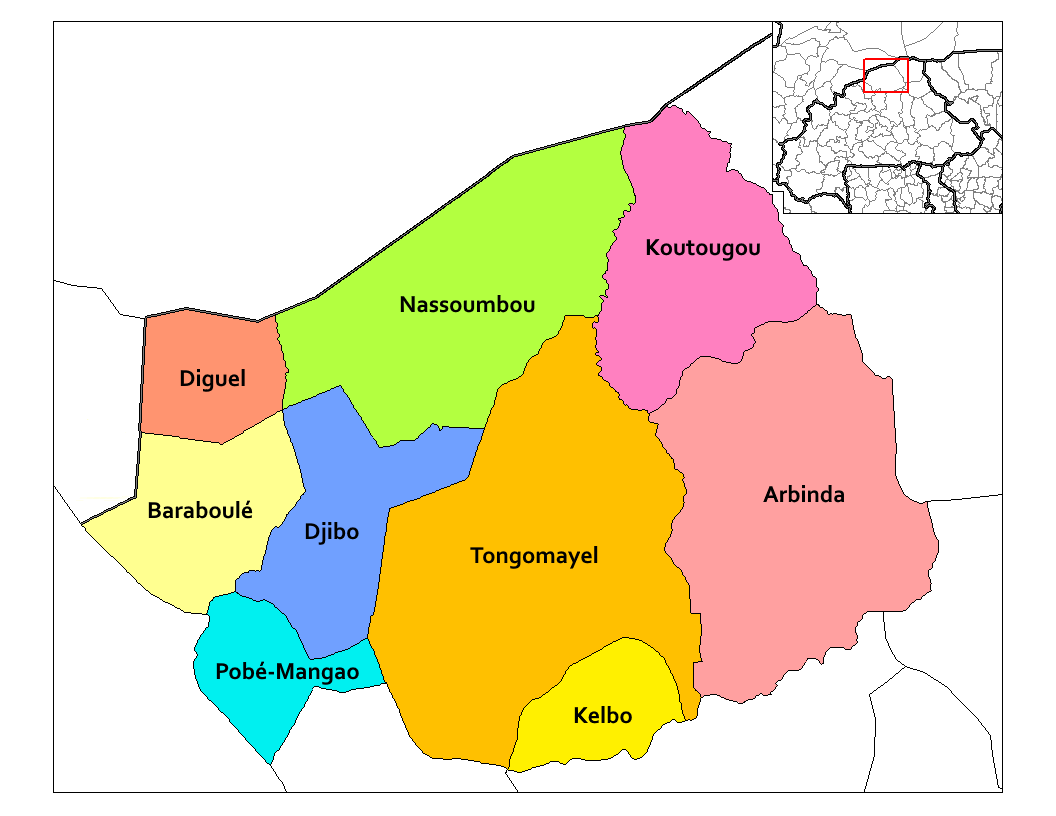
- Pobe-Mengao Department location in the province
- Country: Burkina Faso
- Province: Soum Province
- Time zone: UTC+0 (GMT 0)

Pobe-Mengao is a department or commune of Soum Province in north-western Burkina Faso. Its capital lies at the town of Pobe-Mengao.

== History ==
On 28 October, 2019, Islamists shot 16 civilians dead in Pobe Mengao after they refused to help the gunmen buy weapons. During the incident, the rebels looted shops, stealing several vehicles from store owners. It was part of a broader campaign by Islamist rebels in the country.

== Towns and villages ==
- Pobe-Mengao
