= Kelbo (department) =

- Department
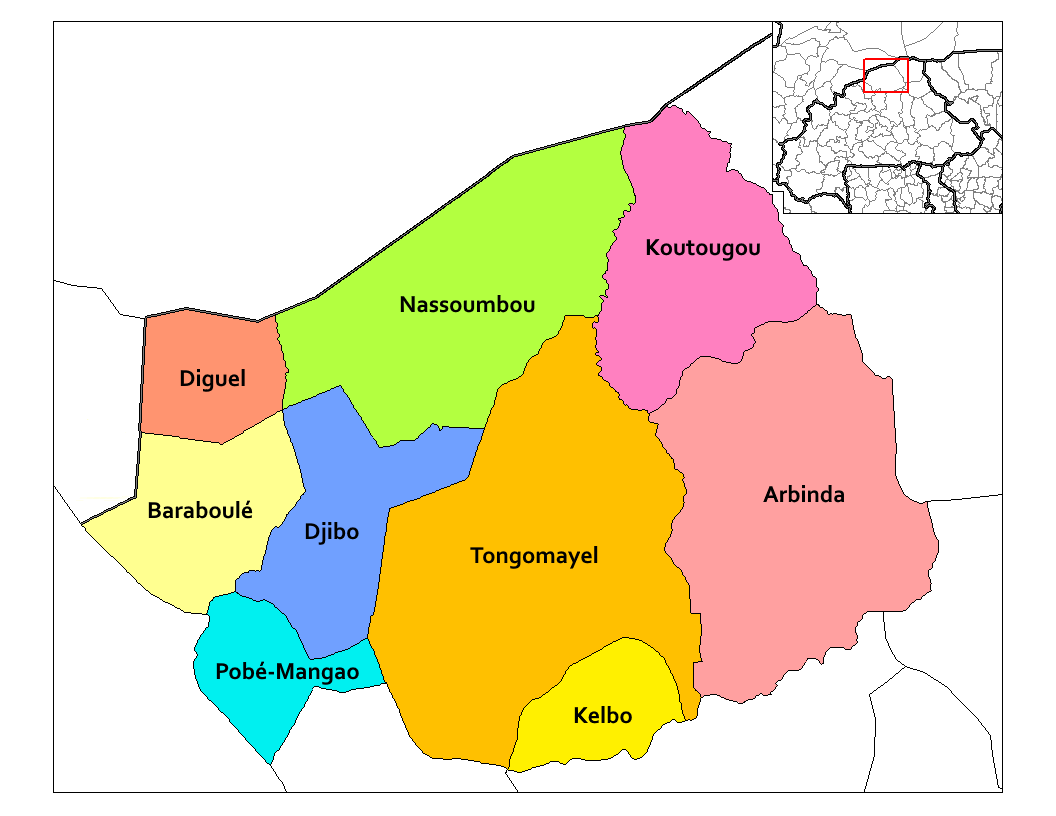
- Kelbo Department location in the province
- Country: Burkina Faso
- Region: Sahel Region
- Province: Soum Province

Population (2012)
  - Total: 24,157
- Time zone: UTC+0 (GMT 0)

Kelbo is a department or commune of Soum Province in Burkina Faso.
