= June 2019 Arbinda massacre =

- Part of Jihadist insurgency in Burkina Faso
- Location: Arbinda, Sahel Region, Burkina Faso
- Date: June 9, 2019
- Deaths: 19
- Injuries: 13
- Perpetrator: Ansarul Islam (suspected)

On June 9, 2019, jihadists from Ansarul Islam attacked the town of Arbinda, Sahel Region, Burkina Faso, killing 19 civilians and wounding 13 others.

== Background ==
Arbinda, in northern Burkina Faso, was the scene of heavy clashes between Fulani and Mossi civilians in April 2019, following increased tensions between the two groups after the Yirgou massacre earlier that year. The area is a hotspot for the homegrown jihadist group Ansarul Islam, allied with Mali-based jihadist coalition Jama'at Nasr al-Islam wal-Muslimin. The town has swelled in recent years from displaced civilians, and maintains a large security presence.

== Massacre ==
The perpetrators of the attack entered the town of Arbinda on motorcycles during a dust storm. A survivor told Human Rights Watch that the jihadists entered Arbinda around 4pm and sped through the town on their motorcycles so that security forces wouldn't catch them. The attackers shot at anything that moved. The town's market was the hardest-hit in the attack, and many traders were killed. Nineteen civilians were killed in the attack, and thirteen were injured. One of those killed in the attack was a prominent chief in Arbinda.

== Aftermath ==
Burkinabe officials stated that a search operation for the perpetrators was underway by June 11, although the results of the search are unknown. Nine days after the attack, jihadists attacked the village of Belehede, killing seventeen civilians. The Islamic State in the Greater Sahara took responsibility for a December 24 attack on Arbinda that killed 35 civilians. ISGS, however, did not claim responsibility for the June 9 or any prior attacks on Arbinda.

The Africa Center for Strategic Studies attributed the attack to Ansarul Islam.

The Turkish Foreign Ministry condemned the attack on June 12.
