= Arbinda Department =

Coordinates: 14°13′31″N 0°51′35″W

Arbinda
- Department
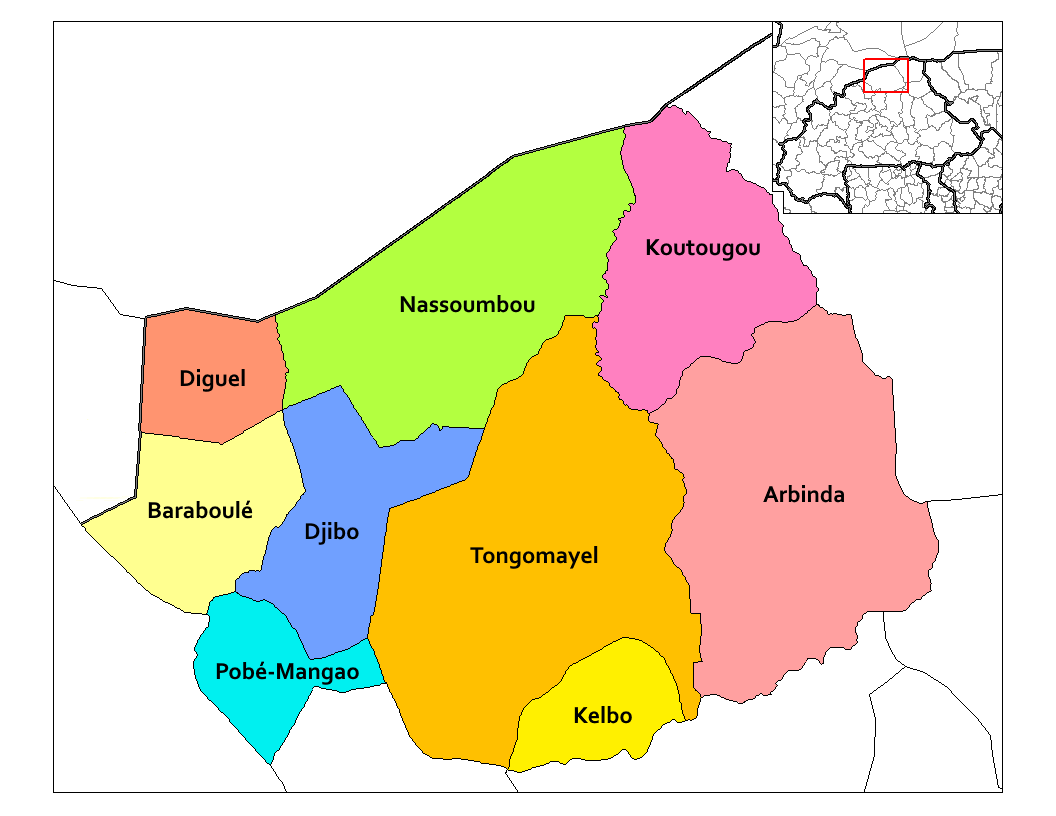
- Arbinda Department location in the province
- Country: Burkina Faso
- Province: Soum Province

Area
  - Total: 978 sq mi (2,534 km^{2})

Population (2019 census)
  - Total: 98,447
  - Density: 100.6/sq mi (38.85/km^{2})
- Time zone: UTC+0 (GMT 0)

Arbinda is a department or commune of Soum Province in north-western Burkina Faso. Its capital is the town of Arbinda.
