= Koutougou Department =

Coordinates: 13.9167°N 1.6333°W

Koutougou
- Department
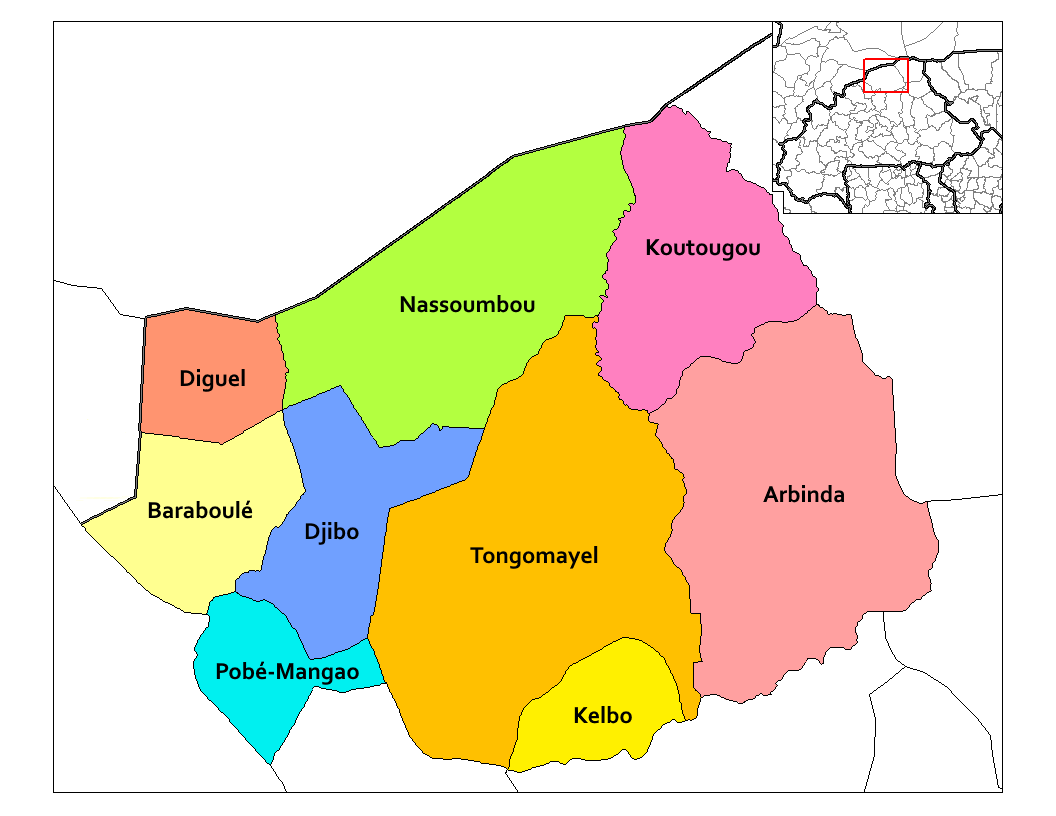
- Koutougou Department location in the province
- Country: Burkina Faso
- Province: Soum Province
- Time zone: UTC+0 (GMT 0)

Koutougou is a department or commune of Soum Province in north-western Burkina Faso. Its capital lies at the town of Koutougou.
