= Kurumba people (West Africa) =

Ethnic group in Burkinabe

Kurumba people, also known as the Nioniosi, reside along the borders of Burkina Faso and Mali. Despite the prevalence of Islam among the Kurumba today, they maintain a fairly rich history of African religious and cultural practices rooted in their pre-Islamic experiences. Historically, the Kurumba migrated from the region currently inhabited by the Dogon people. Similar to the Dogon and their neighbors, the Bamana, the Kurumba are organized into clans and hold strong ancestral ties to their traditions. They speak the Koromfe language.

Their artistic reputation which are worn during funeral ceremonies and are believed to represent the soul of the deceased.

== Clans ==
The clans of the Kurumba (Nioniosi) people are:

Clan
Sawadougou
Zale
Sawadougou
Tao
