= Djibo Department =

Djibo
- Department
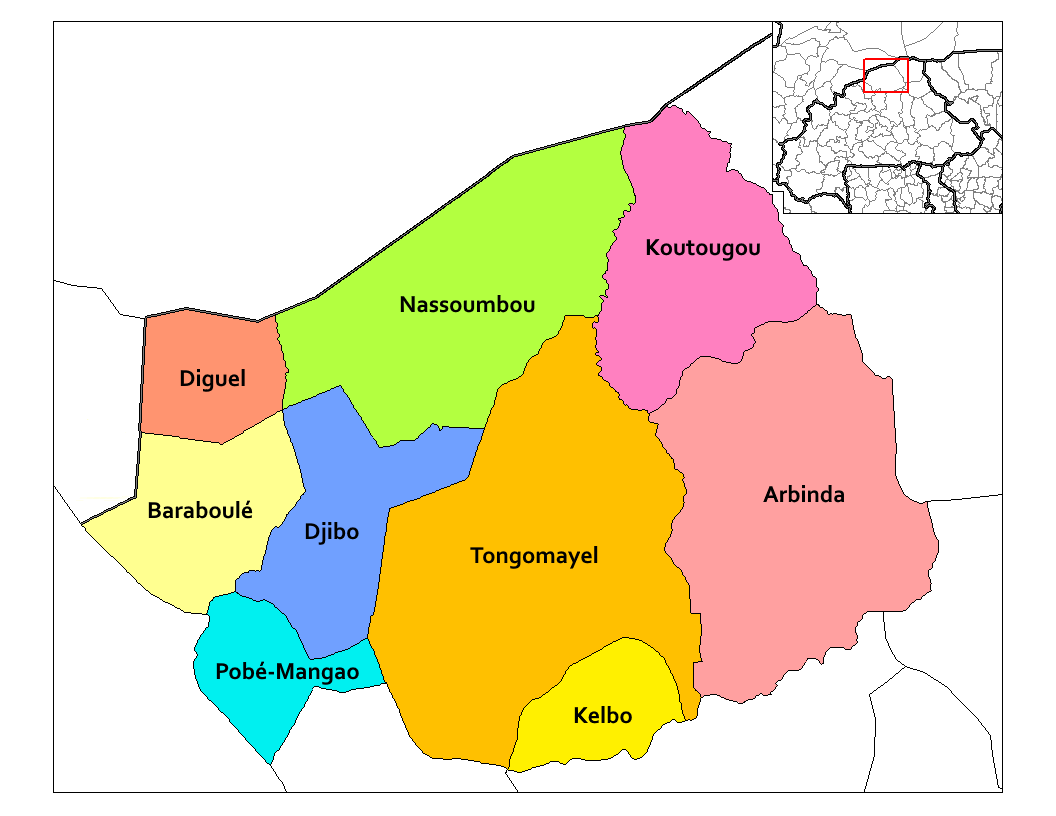
- Djibo Department location in the province
- Country: Burkina Faso
- Province: Soum Province

Area
  - Department: 390 sq mi (1,020 km^{2})

Population (2019 census)
  - Department: 83,193
  - Density: 211/sq mi (81.6/km^{2})
  - Urban: 61,462
- Time zone: UTC+0 (GMT 0)

Djibo is a department or commune of Soum Province in north-western Burkina Faso. Its capital is the town of Djibo.
