= Inata =

Inata عيناتا
- Village
- Location in Syria
- Coordinates: 34°45′40″N 36°21′33″E
- Country: Syria
- Governorate: Homs
- District: Talkalakh
- Subdistrict: Al-Hawash

Population (2004)
  - Total: 780
- Time zone: UTC+2 (EET)
  - Summer (DST): +3
- City Qrya Pcode: C2849

Inata (Arabic: عيناتا) is a village in Syria in the Talkalakh District, Homs Governorate. According to the Syria Central Bureau of Statistics, Inata had a population of 780 in the 2004 census. Its inhabitants are predominantly Alawites.
