= Baraboulé Department =

Coordinates: 14.2°N 1.85°W

Baraboule
- Department
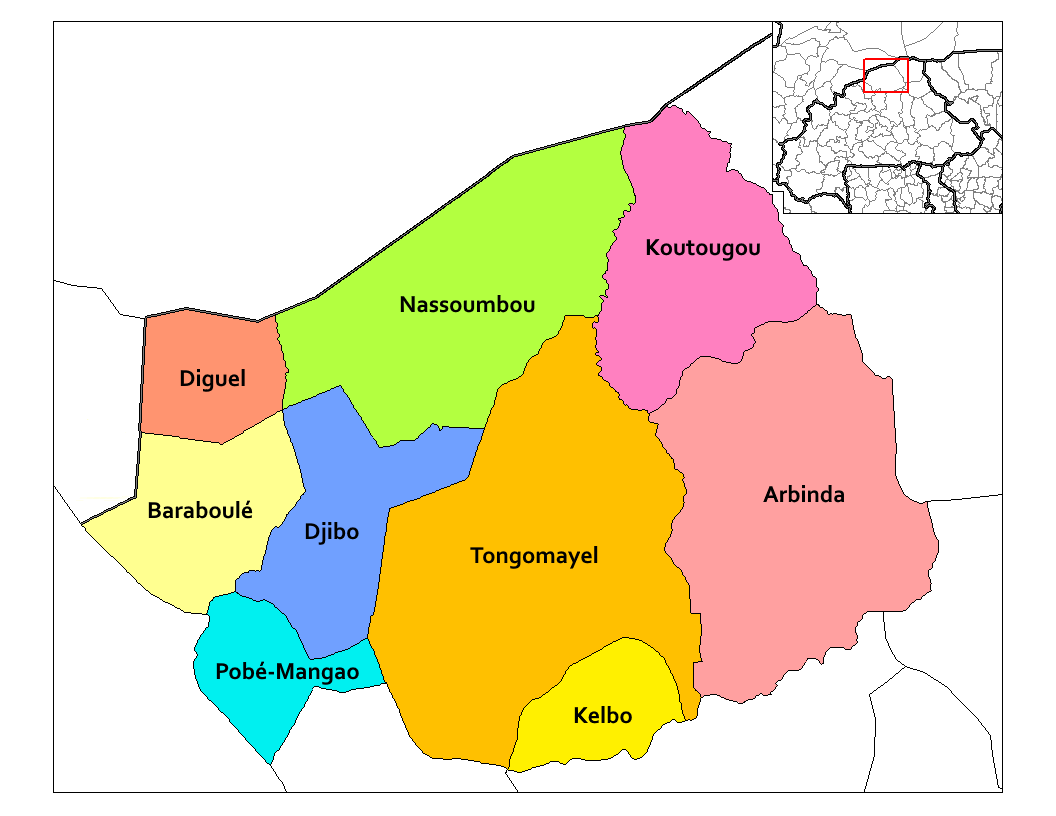
- Baraboule Department location in the province
- Country: Burkina Faso
- Province: Soum Province
- Time zone: UTC+0 (GMT 0)

Baraboule is a department or commune of Soum Province in north-western Burkina Faso. Its capital lies at the town of Baraboule.
