= Fulse people =

Fulse people, or Foulse, are a cultural and ethnic group in West Africa, primarily living in western Burkina Faso. The Fulse people speak a Niger-Congo dialect within the Grusi linguistic and Gurunsi cultural groups. There are an estimated 100,000 people who identify themselves as Fulse.
