= Bourzanga =

Village in Bourzanga Department, Burkina Faso

- Location in Burkina Faso
- Coordinates: 13°40′41″N 1°32′46″W
- Country: Burkina Faso
- Region: Centre-Nord Region
- Province: Bam Province
- Department: Bourzanga Department

Population (2019 census)
  - Total: 27,213

Bourzanga is the capital of the Bourzanga Department of Bam Province in northern Burkina Faso. The town contains an ancient necropolis that was added to the UNESCO World Heritage Tentative List on April 9, 1996, due to its purported universal cultural importance.

Attacks have been common in Bourzanga in recent years. In 2022, all travel to Bourzanga had to be suspended due to armed militant activity. In August 2024, the town was attacked by JNIM, which left at least 600 people dead.

== Necropolis complex ==
Bourzanga's necropolis complex contains two sites, each belonging to a different population group. The first consists of Dogon jar-coffins that contains the remnants of a wide variety of ceramics and pottery. The second is the Kurumba royal necropolis with 109 stelae, up to 1.51 m high.

In 2009, the site had an estimated total of 1000 visitors, and it had generated approximately $94,000 in revenue.

== Demographics ==
Population
Year	Pop.	±%
1985	4,379	—
2006	7,235	+65.2%
2019	27,213	+276.1%
