= Tongomayel Department =

Coordinates: 14.0661°N 1.4833°W

Tongomavel
- Department
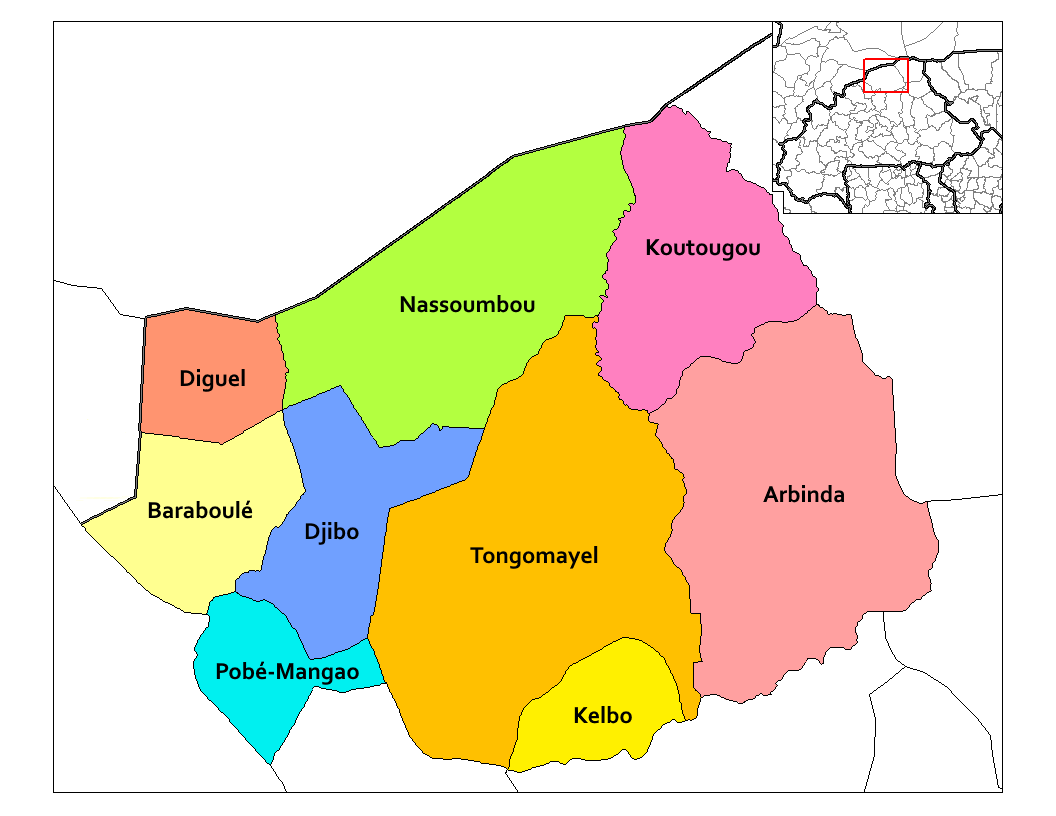
- Tongomayel Department location in the province
- Country: Burkina Faso
- Province: Soum Province

Area
  - Total: 1,155 sq mi (2,992 km^{2})

Population (2019 census)
  - Total: 51,768
  - Density: 44.81/sq mi (17.30/km^{2})
- Time zone: UTC+0 (GMT 0)

Tongomavel is a department or commune of Soum Province in north-western Burkina Faso. Its capital lies at the town of Tongomavel.
