= Nassoumbou Department =

Coordinates: 14.4167°N 1.5500°W

Nassoumbou
- Department
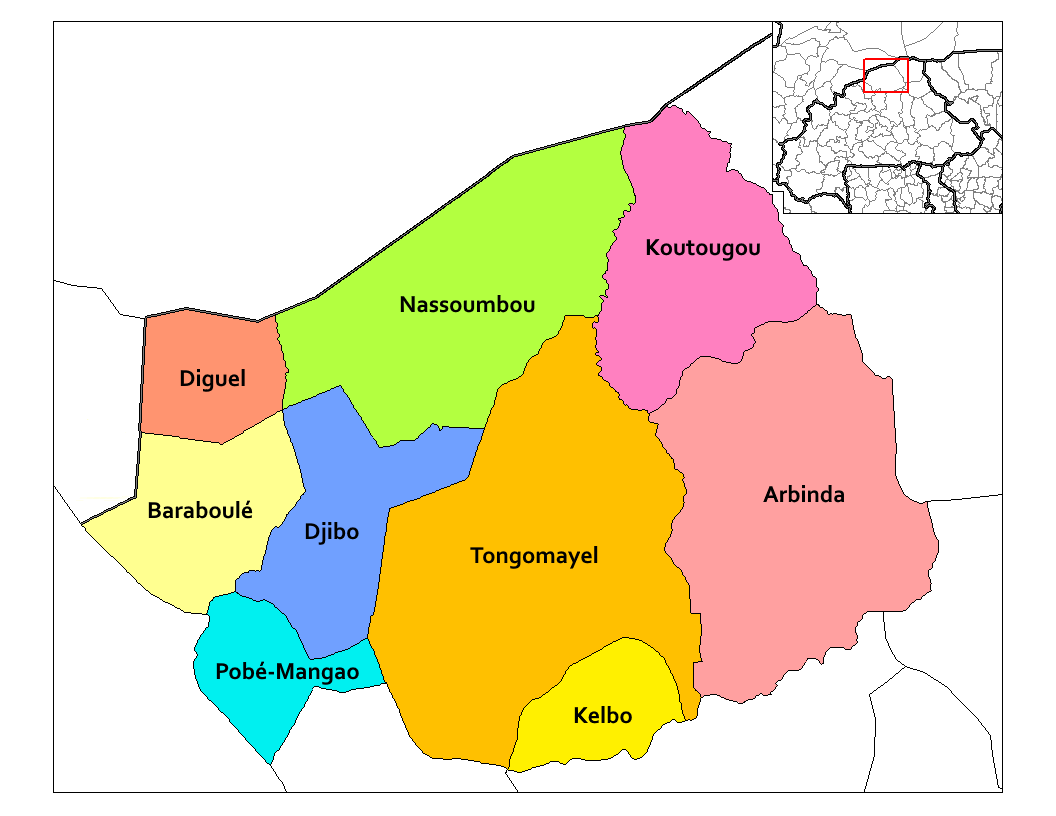
- Nassoumbou Department location in the province
- Country: Burkina Faso
- Province: Soum Province

Area
  - Total: 804 sq mi (2,082 km^{2})

Population (2019 census)
  - Total: 18,013
  - Density: 22.41/sq mi (8.652/km^{2})
- Time zone: UTC+0 (GMT 0)

Nassoumbou is a department or commune of Soum Province in north-western Burkina Faso. Its capital lies at the town of Nassoumbou.

== See also ==
- 2016 Nassoumbou attack
