= Arbinda =

- Town
- Location in Burkina Faso
- Coordinates: 14°13′45″N 0°51′48″W
- Country: Burkina Faso
- Region: Sahel Region
- Province: Soum Province
- Department: Arbinda Department

Population (2019 census)
  - Total: 45,818
- Time zone: UTC±00:00 (GMT)

Arbinda (also spelled Aribinda) is a town in and the capital of the Arbinda Department of Soum Province in northern Burkina Faso. The town has a population of 45,818 as of 2019.

== History ==
On 24 December 2019, a group of militants attacked civilians and a military base in Arbinda in one of Burkina Faso's deadliest attacks. At least 122 people were killed, including 35 civilians, 7 soldiers, and 80 attackers.
