= Djibo =

- Town
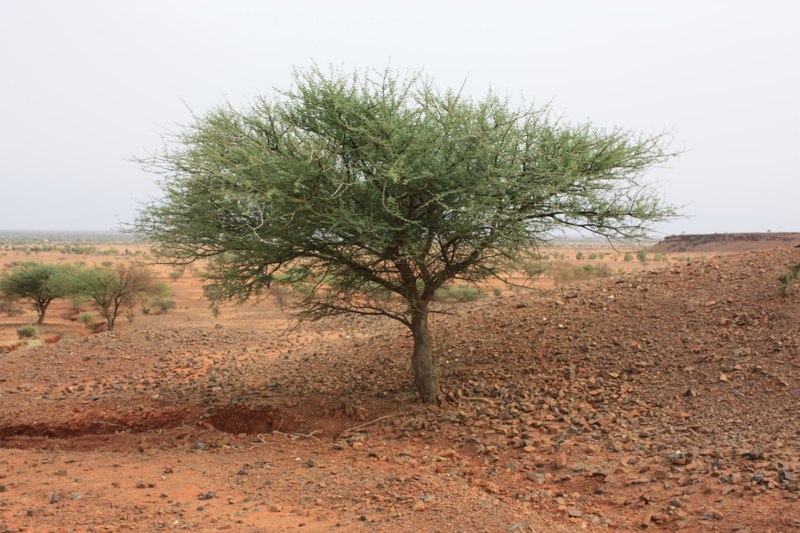
- Senegalia laeta specimen in Djibo

- Location within Burkina Faso, West Africa
- Coordinates: 14°06′04″N 01°37′50″W
- Country: Burkina Faso
- Region: Sahel
- Province: Soum Province
- Founded: 16th century
- Elevation: 286 m (938 ft)

Population (2019 census)
  - Total: 61,462
- Time zone: UTC+0 (GMT)

Djibo is a town in northern Burkina Faso and the capital city of Soum Province. It is situated 203 km (126 mi) north of Ouagadougou and 45 km (28 mi) from the border with Mali. It was founded in the 16th century, became the capital of a regional state in the 17th century, and later the seat of an emirate in the 18th century. It is known for its animal market. The main ethnic group is the Fulani.

Djibo retains a traditional chieftaincy led by an emir.

== History ==
According to traditional accounts, Djibo was founded by Sambo Nana of Douentza in the second half of the 16th century. It became the capital of the Djilgodji state in the 17th century. Around the late 17th or early 18th century, Fulani groups migrated into the region, allied with local clans, and formed the Jelgobe lineage. In the 18th century's second half, the Jelgobe under two brothers reportedly defeated the chiefs of the Djilgodji and set up two emirates, one centered at Djibo and the other at Baraboullé.

Either 1834–37 or 1858, the Caliphate of Hamdullahi (Massina Empire) invaded the region, and subjugated the local emirates including Djobo. In 1897, Hamdullahi rule collapsed, and the French took control. The latter chose Djobo as the center of the Jelgoji administrative unit in French Upper Volta.

The spillway of Djibo Dam was the scene of a potentially catastrophic accident involving a cyanide-laden truck en route to the nearby Inata gold mine on the 29 July 2011. The population of Djibo nearly tripled from about 100,000 to 270,000 between 2019 and 2022, as refugees fled from nearby villages due to the Islamist insurgency in Burkina Faso. Africanews reported on 4 March 2022 that a humanitarian crisis was unfolding in the city as it was laid siege to by jihadist forces. On 11 May 2025, more than 100 people were reported killed in an attack by jihadists on the town.

== List of emirs of Djibo ==
- Dicko Bouboucari dit Manga (r. 1919–1952)
- Dicko Amadou Manga (r. 1952–1984)
- Boubacari Dicko (r. 1987–2025)
