= Ansarul Islam (Sahel) =

Militant Islamist group

- The black flag variant used by AQIM
- Leaders: Ibrahim Malam Dicko (2016–2017); Abdoul Salam Dicko (2017–Present)
- Dates active: December 2016–present
- Ideology: Salafi Jihadism
- Size: 300–350
- Part of: Jama'at Nasr al-Islam wal Muslimin (2017–present)
- Wars: War in the Sahel; Islamist insurgency in Burkina Faso; Mali War

Ansarul Islam is a militant Islamist group active in Burkina Faso and in Mali. It was founded by Boureima Dicko, also known as Ibrahim Malam Dicko, and it is the first native Jihadi group in Burkina Faso. The group cooperated closely with Jama'at Nasr al-Islam wal Muslimin (JNIM) and later in 2017 joined them.

== History ==
The group announced its existence in December 2016 in a statement claiming responsibility for an attack in Nassoumbou. It was founded and led by Ibrahim Malam Dicko until his death in May 2017 from natural causes.

The group has claimed responsibility for several attacks. These include the attack on two police stations in Tongomayel and Baraboulé in February 2017 and the attack at a village in Soum in March 2017. Later in 2017, it joined Jama'at Nasr al-Islam wal-Muslimin, however it still exists as organization, while not independent anymore. The decision to join JNIM was spurred by the death of Dicko, who was hesitant about joining the alliance.

On 30 October 2020, about fifty jihadists on motorcycles belonging to the Ansarul Islam group were killed by the French Army in Mali, near the border with Burkina Faso. Weapons and equipment were also seized.

== See also ==
- Jihadist insurgency in Burkina Faso
- Mali War
