= Djelgodji Province =

Coordinates: 14°06′N 1°38′W

Djelgodji
- Province
- Location in Burkina Faso

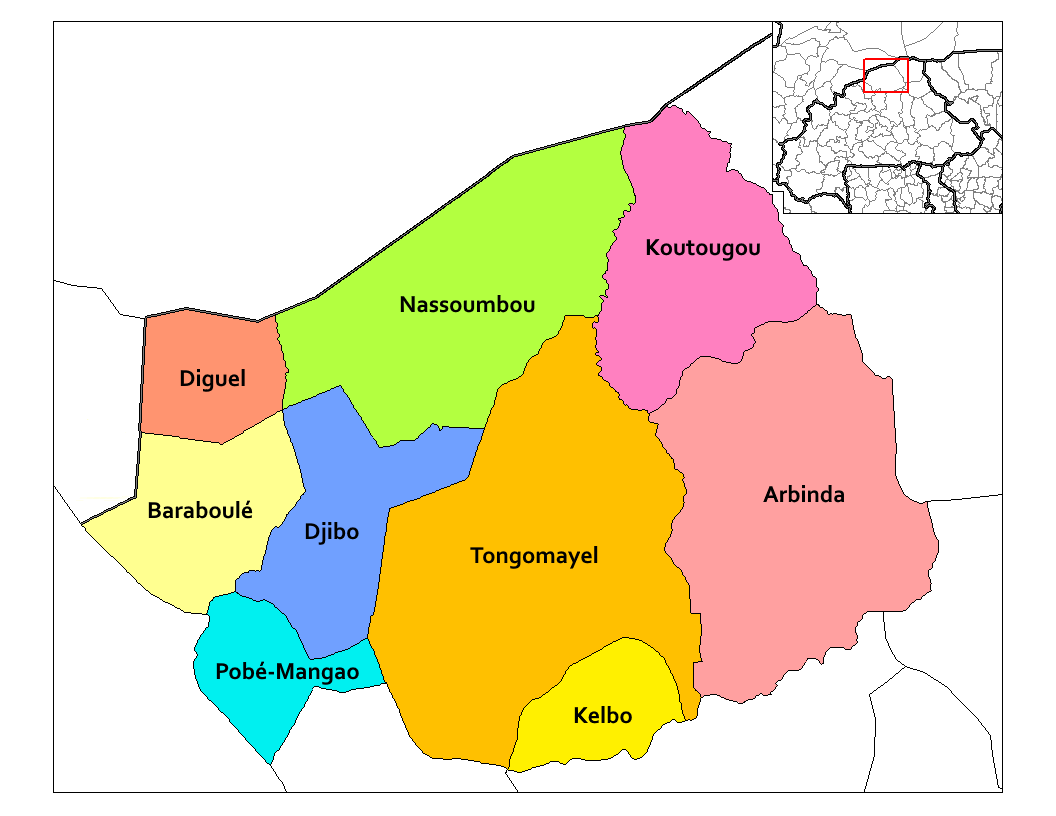
- Provincial map of its departments
- Country: Burkina Faso
- Region: Sahel Region
- Capital: Djibo

Area
  - Province: 12,205 km^{2} (4,712 sq mi)

Population (2019 census)
  - Province: 363,633
  - Density: 29.794/km^{2} (77.166/sq mi)
  - Urban: 61,462
- Time zone: UTC+0 (GMT 0)

Djelgodji (formerly known as the Soum province up until July 2, 2025), is one of the 45 provinces of Burkina Faso, located in its Sahel Region.

Its capital is in the town of Djibo.

== Departments ==
Djelgodji is divided into 9 departments:

The Departments of Djelgodji
Department	Capital city	Population (Census 2006)
Arbinda Department	Arbinda	90,735
Baraboule Department	Baraboule	30,209
Diguel Department	Diguel	9,055
Djibo Department	Djibo	60,599
Kelbo Department	Kelbo	24,446
Koutougou Department	Koutougou	18,719
Nassoumbou Department	Nassoumbou	20,222
Pobe-Mengao Department	Pobe-Mengao	23,692
Tongomayel Department	Tongomayel	70,665

== See also ==
- Regions of Burkina Faso
- Provinces of Burkina Faso
- Departments of Burkina Faso
