= Islamist insurgency in Benin =

- Part of War in the Sahel
- Map of Benin
Date	18 November 2021 – present
Location	Atakora Department, Alibori Department, and Borgou Department, Benin
Territorial changes	JNIM controls parts of W National Park and Pendjari National Park, extends influence over many towns in Atakora, Alibori, and Borgou

Belligerents
Benin; African Parks	Jama'at Nusrat al-Islam wal-Muslimin	IS–SP; Lakurawa

Commanders and leaders
Patrice Talon	Idrissa Dicko	Unknown

Casualties and losses
- 350+ killed in total 35,000 displaced

An ongoing armed conflict in Benin is being waged by Islamist insurgent groups, primarily the al-Qaeda-affiliate Jama'at Nasr al-Islam wal-Muslimin (JNIM) and to a lesser extent the Islamic State's Sahel Province (ISSP) and Islamic State (IS)-aligned Lakurawa. The insurgency began in late 2021 with low-level attacks near the Nigerien and Burkinabe borders, but escalated in 2022 after the Beninese government launched heavy counterattacks. Dozens of Beninese soldiers were killed in the first few months of 2025 after heightened JNIM activity. Benin was the first coastal West African country to see a permanent JNIM presence in it, with Togo, Ghana, and Côte d'Ivoire seeing temporary areas of influence.

== Background ==
The organizations that would grow to become Jama'at Nasr al-Islam wal-Muslimin (JNIM) and the Islamic State's Sahel Province (ISSP) began as several Islamist Tuareg-dominated militant groups that hijacked the 2012 Tuareg rebellion in Mali. Following the French intervention in 2013 that crippled many of these groups, the Fulani Katiba Macina rose to become the preeminent jihadist group in Mali, expanding to Burkina Faso in 2015. Katiba Macina and several other jihadist groups founded the JNIM coalition, al-Qaeda's faction in the Sahel, in 2017.

By 2019, JNIM had a sizable presence in Mali and Burkina Faso, with a small presence in Niger, and predominantly sought support from the Fulani ethnic group. Hit-and-run attacks on government forces and gold mines allowed the group to fund its activities and expand its areas of influence, particularly in Burkina Faso. By 2021, JNIM had a large presence in southern Burkina Faso and often had temporary camps along the Beninese and Togolese borders in the southeast and the Ivorian and Ghanaian borders where they would evade Burkinabe forces. The primary katiba, or brigade, of JNIM conducting these activities was the Katiba Mouslimou subgroup of Katiba Hanifa, based in Burkina Faso and Niger. Prior to attacks in Beninese territory by these groups, both Beninese and Togolese soldiers were deployed in heavy numbers along the Burkinabe border, as part of the Accra Initiative in 2017 to combat jihadist expansion.

The Islamic State first gained a presence near Benin in 2019, using Alibori Department as a resting location for its attacks on other areas, particularly in the Mali-Burkina Faso-Niger tri-border region. The group was thought to have disappeared, although it reappeared in Alibori in September 2022. ISSP first contacted civilians in Malanville in 2019, and the W National Park became a fallback zone from clashes with JNIM in 2020.

=== Local and political factors contributing to the insurgency ===
Fulani groups in Mali, Niger, and Burkina Faso, like the Tuareg before them, live mainly in rural areas of their countries while the ethnic group itself spans several borders. Because of this, Fulani civilians have often been marginalized by the government and have disproportionately been denied access to technological development and social ascension in Sahelian states. The Fulani are also a minority in northern Benin, with only about 860,000 members, and in recent years have been at the forefront of the Beninese government's push to modernize the north and curb traditional nomadic movements. Additionally, the conservative interpretations of Islam that many Fulani practice have helped turn many young Fulani in Burkina Faso and Mali towards the hardline Islamist groups.

Like conflicts between the Mossi and Fulani over land rights in Burkina Faso, Bambara and Fulani in Mali, and Zarma and Fulani in Niger, self-defense militias supported by the Beninese government to defend against jihadist groups have used their weapons to attack Fulani civilians and settle local scores. Fulani civilians targeted in these attacks sought out the jihadist groups for protection. Additionally, the Islamic State's main support base of Tolebe Fulani is the same clan of Fulani living in northern Benin; the Islamic State has exploited these links to establish donations and sermons to Fulani in northern Benin. The Beninese government publicized arrests of JNIM militants and supporters deep in Beninese territory, Kouandé and Kouatena, in June 2021.

Politically, violent incidents were on the rise in northern Benin between 2017 and 2020. Atakora, Alibori, and Borgou departments were the three most volatile regions with political violence, with Borgou having four times as many violent incidents as the two former despite having a lower population density. Furthermore, the violent incidents in Alibori resulted in more casualties than those in Atakora. In the three departments, violence is also differently spread out; in Atakora violence was mainly around the rural national parks; in Alibori it was clustered along the Kandi-Malanville road and along the Niger river and border. In Borgou, violence is spread throughout the department. Almost all of the violence was communal in nature, although in border departments like Alibori some of the violence was committed by Nigerien and Nigerian individuals. These communal conflicts, between farmers and herders or over land rights, are exactly the kinds of conflicts that jihadist groups exploited in Mali, Burkina Faso, Niger, and Nigeria before they embedded themselves in the region.

Reports of communal attacks and bordering jihadist violence were downplayed by President Patrice Talon in the leadup to the 2021 Beninese presidential election, including reports of a JNIM incursion into Pendjari in March and a second incursion in April.

=== Pre-insurgency attacks ===
The first major incident of jihadist violence in northern Benin occurred on 1 May 2019, when two French tourists were kidnapped by jihadists while on a safari in Pendjari National Park. While the kidnapping was organized by Katiba Macina, part of JNIM, the individuals that carried out the kidnapping were part of the Islamic State in the Greater Sahara. The hostages were freed in a rescue operation that took place in Gorom-Gorom.

== Timeline ==
=== Early attacks ===
While jihadist groups held a small temporary presence in northern Benin, particularly along the Burkinabe and Nigerien borders and in the W National Park and Pendjari National Park areas through 2020 and early 2021, the first attack against Beninese forces did not occur until 18 November 2021, in the village of Nadiagou. Nadiagou is a strategic location between Fada N'gourma and Tanguiéta and between Niger and Burkina Faso. The Nadiagou attacks were preceded by three operations by anti-jihadist allies; the Burkinabe Operation Ougapo 2, the joint Burkinabe-Nigerien Operation Taanli 2, and the Operation Koundalgou 4 by Ghana, Togo, Côte d'Ivoire, and Burkina Faso. November 2021 was effectively the start of JNIM attacks on Beninese territory and against Beninese soldiers, with the second attack occurring on 30 November. That day, a small skirmish broke out between suspected JNIM militants and Beninese soldiers near the town, killing one and injuring another. On 1 December, JNIM militants attacked a Beninese outpost in Porga; nine days later on 10 December, an IED explosion near Porga injured four soldiers.

Between December 2021 and early 2022, the Beninese government began construction of their "Maginot Line" along the Beninese-Burkinabe border to prevent further jihadist incursions. This defense was bolstered in the park areas in Atacora rather than populated places. The line was composed of several mobile posts manned by the Beninese Armed Forces (FAB) and a no man's land along the actual Burkinabe-Beninese border. Between January and May 2022, there were only several militant and IED attacks against Beninese forces. The most notable of these attacks was at W National Park, where eight Beninese soldiers were killed in February.

=== Burkinabe expansion and the collapse of the Maginot Line ===
North of the border, JNIM expanded its de facto control over most of Burkina Faso's Kompienga Province and began expanding into Benin's Atakora Department and Burkina Faso's Tapoa Province. All three regions are under the control of Idrissa Dicko, also known as Emir Mouslimou. With key cities like Madjoari falling to JNIM in May and the group expanding its influence to conduct a siege on Fada N'Gourma, Benin's Maginot Line began to fall apart. In June 2022, JNIM tightened its siege on the town of Pama in southeastern Burkina, crippling the town's booming agricultural economy and forcing out its residents. That summer saw many towns and villages across Kompienga Province be emptied from the JNIM sieges. This expansion of control in southeastern Burkina Faso was the first step in offensives into Togo and Benin for JNIM, although Beninese and Togolese expansion was not the primary goal of these operations for JNIM.

Between December 2021 and September 2022, the Clingendael Institute and ACLED recorded 43 violent incidents regarding jihadist groups and Beninese forces. JNIM expanded its use of IED attacks in Beninese territory, inhibiting the mobile nature of the defenses and dissuading African Parks Network patrollers and FAB forces from maintaining positions in the parks. Consistent ambushes and IED attacks decreased Beninese morale, and allowed JNIM militants free access to the parks and surrounding villages. By July 2022, JNIM was in de facto control of both national parks, the Beninese-Burkinabe border, and the villages of Guene and Monsey in Alibori Department. Areas under Beninese control but heavy influence from JNIM included Koualou, Dassari, Matéri, Goungoun, Karimama, and Pekinga. In Beninese territory under the influence of JNIM, civilians are subject to forced conscription, preaching of hardline interpretations of Islam, and are prohibited from showing support for the Beninese government.

The goal of these consistent attacks by JNIM against FAB was also to create a buffer zone along the Beninese-Burkinabe border and a safe zone from Burkinabe forces in Beninese national parks. Attacks on Togolese territory also lent credence to the possibility of JNIM using northern Togo to conduct attacks on Atacora department. The larger goal by the end of 2022 was for JNIM to create a buffer zone for its attacks that stretched from the Ivorian border to Niger.

=== The Islamic State's Role ===
At this same time, the Islamic State began expanding its influence into Guene, Boiffo, and Malanville from Nigerien territory beginning in September 2022. Despite the war flaring up between JNIM and ISSP hundreds of kilometers to the north, there were no incidents of fighting between JNIM and ISSP in northern Benin in 2022. However, these groups both sought control over the same communities (Guene and Malanville), emphasizing goodwill trips over direct fighting to establish dominance. Since 2019, ISSP has trained young Fulani in Niger to send them to northern Benin for war and for establishing relations with the population.

Both the Islamic State and JNIM in 2022 sought to use northern Benin as a land route to their affiliates in northern Nigeria; JNIM wanted to link up to Ansaru, and even used small teams of militants to link up with Ansaru and allied bandit cells in the Kainji National Park forests. After 2021, these efforts became less and less successful. On the other hand, ISSP sought out Fulani communities in northwest Nigeria to facilitate their operations in Benin. A third group, the loosely-IS aligned Lakurawa based in northwest Nigeria, also had connections with Beninese jihadist networks in 2022, but to what extent is unknown. For both groups, connections in Alibori Department were crucial to maintaining two provinces of their respective jihadist outfit; JNIM and Ansaru, and ISSP and Islamic State – West Africa Province.

=== Government response and Defulanization ===
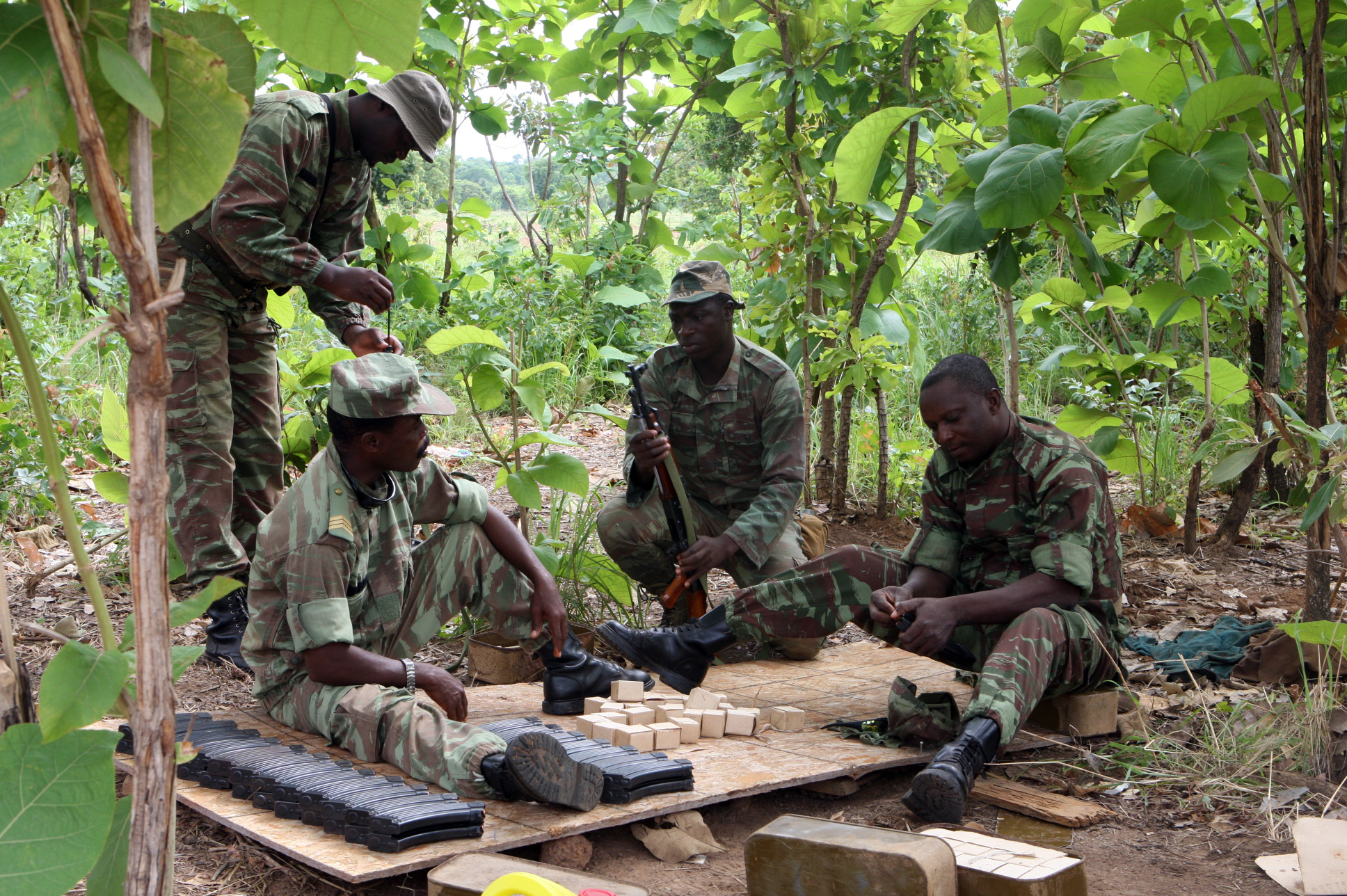
Beninese Army soldiers in training (2009 photograph)

In late 2022, the Beninese government founded new organizations and improved existing ones to combat the rising jihadist threat; the National Guard, the First Commando Parachute Battalion, and the First Armored Group were established, and the Defense and Security Forces (Forces de Defense et Securite) were improved from an underequipped ragtag militia into a more modern army. The National Guard was expanded to be five times larger, under the control of Colonel Codjo Francois Amoussou and his deputy Faizal Gomina. By February 2025, the Beninese Army had 8,200 soldiers active on the frontlines and 1,500 in training. The Beninese government also improved development and relations with northern Beninese communities. President Talon met with Fulani community leaders in December 2024 to ease tensions and prevent Fulani youth from flocking to JNIM. Despite this, JNIM and ISSP (particularly the former) expanded their messaging towards Beninese civilians, and targeted non-Fulani groups like Gourmantches also located in northern Benin.

Between 2022 and 2023, JNIM utilized existing smuggling, poaching, and illicit networks in Benin as sources of cash and goodwill. Audio messages were released in Bariba calling on civilians to turn to JNIM and to "rise up against those who grab their land, enrich themselves and benefit on the back of their efforts." However, other JNIM propaganda is explicitly religious and called for abstinence from alcohol and smoking.

Three zones of JNIM activity in northern Benin were also evident by 2023; the ethnic melting pot of Western Atakora, the Nigerien border zone of Northern Alibori, and the Banikorara-Kerou-Kouande area. Western Atakora was the dominant region of expansion for JNIM in 2021 and 2022, being home to Pendjari National Park and Berba, Ditamari, Natemba, Yende, Gourmantche, and pockets of Fulani communities. JNIM focused their original proselytization efforts and smuggling networks here, but did not address ethnic tensions. In northern Alibori, JNIM solidified territorial ambitions in September 2022 in villages along the Niger river to expel ISSP militants, but were eventually pushed out by Beninese FDS after November 2022. After February 2023, both Beninese soldiers and JNIM focused their efforts on W National Park. By August 2023, renewed ties and months of aid distribution and mediation efforts by JNIM allowed for the group to make a comeback in northern Alibori, extending their influence over several towns. Late 2022 was the first time JNIM militants and sympathizers made their way into Banikoara and nearby towns and threatened local schools; clashes between JNIM and FAB did not occur in this area until early 2023. Originally, this was an area with little FAB presence, but this changed by the end of 2023. Additionally, cordial Bariba-Fulani relations forced JNIM to rely on land dispute mediation efforts to gain public sympathy. Between October and December 2025, the force "neutralised 45 terrorists and arrested 7 suspects, who were handed over to the competent judicial authorities", said an army memo seen by AFP.

=== Foreign help ===
Diplomatically, the Beninese government turned to more stable African and non-African countries to maintain stability in their north. In February 2022, Beninese officials strengthened ties with France, who conducted airstrikes against JNIM camps along the Burkinabe-Beninese border that month. In 2023, France delivered 26 APCs to the FAB, followed by 15 more one year later. France also delivered motorcycles, pick-ups, and three Puma helicopters to the Beninese army. The European Union also delivered to Benin two Mamba armored vehicles initially intended for the Nigerien army, and also received $5 million to bolster its army.

In 2024 and 2025, Benin strengthened military and diplomatic ties with the United States, particularly after the Nigerien junta evicted American forces from Agadez in 2024. U.S. officials from AFRICOM met with Beninese officials in January 2025. The American government also refurbished an airfield in Parakou and stationed medics and other personnel there to evacuate injured Beninese soldiers from the frontlines.

The FAB Chief of Staff Fructeaux Gbaguidi met with Rwandan officials in July 2022 and signed an agreement allowing the deployment of 350 Rwandan Defence Force (RDF) troops to combat jihadists. The Benin deployment would be Rwanda's first troop deployment to West Africa, and third intervention after the Central African Republic and Mozambique. However, by 2024, Rwandan troops were not on the ground in Benin, and Beninese officials stated that that provision was no longer happening.

== Intensification ==
Following the two military coups in Burkina Faso in January and September 2022 and the July 2023 military coup in Niger, both JNIM and ISSP intensified economic warfare in communities they had embedded themselves into in northern Benin. The coups had made international cooperation along the border of G5 Sahel states near impossible, and crippled FAB's ability to combat JNIM on both sides of their borders. In addition to solidifying existing illicit trade routes, the Islamic State began attacking oil pipelines between Benin and Niger, with a December 2024 attack killing three soldiers and wounding four. In 2023, Benin had the highest increase in jihadist attacks across the continent.

In fall 2024, JNIM expanded its operations in southern Niger's Dosso Region along the border with Benin. Dosso was traditionally an IS stronghold, and JNIM expansion in the area gave them a line of operations all across the northern Beninese border. Analysts warned that southern Dosso expansion would be a staging point for further attacks on Benin; that is exactly what happened in 2025. By the start of 2025, JNIM was entrenched in W National Park and Pendjari along with the Dosso border. JNIM's Katiba Mouslimou and Katiba Abu Hanifa were responsible for attacks in Benin. The Islamic State, conversely, was more entrenched along the Nigerien-Nigerian border near Gaya and had only just begun to attack civilian and military targets.

By April 2025, JNIM attacks in Benin had killed more people than all attacks in 2024, and 2025 losses were equal to 80% of all losses in the past four years. This was due to several high-profile ambushes taking place along the border. The first was the Point Triple attack along the Nigerien-Burkinabe-Beninese tri-point, where at least 30 Beninese soldiers were killed. The base at the time was extremely underprepared for an attack, and was in ongoing construction. On 17 April, the Beninese government reported that eight soldiers were killed in another JNIM ambush on a base, this time near Koudou Falls. JNIM stated that 70 soldiers were killed in this attack. It is more likely that JNIM's toll is closer to the truth, as the Beninese government has threatened newspapers with bans if they report on the conflict in the north. On 25 May 2026, JNIM militants attacked Beninese military barracks in Koalou, near the Burkina Faso border, killing 12.

== See also ==
- Islamist insurgency in Burkina Faso
