= List of power stations in Burkina Faso =

The following page lists all power stations in Burkina Faso.

== Hydroelectric ==
Hydroelectric station	Community	Coordinates	Type	Capacity	Year completed	Reservoir	River
Kompienga Hydroelectric Power Station	Kompienga Province	11.0824°N 0.7009°E	Reservoir	14 MW	1989	Lake Kompienga	Ouale River
Bagré Hydroelectric Power Station	Bagré Town	11.4629°N 0.5583°W	Reservoir	16 MW	1994	Lake Bagre	Nakambe River

== Thermal ==
Thermal power station	Community	Coordinates	Fuel type	Capacity	Year completed	Owner	Notes
Bobo-Dioulasso Power Station	Bobo-Dioulasso		Diesel fuel	43 MW		SONABEL	
Ouagadougou Power Station	Ouagadougou		Diesel fuel	22 MW	2012	SONABEL	
Kona Thermal Power Station	Kona		Diesel fuel	22 MW		Semafo of Canada	
Fada N'gourma Thermal Power Station	Fada N'gourma		Diesel fuel	7.5 MW		SONABEL	In development
Ouahigouya Thermal Power Station	Ouahigouya		Diesel fuel	7.5 MW		SONABEL	In development

== Solar ==
Solar power station	Community	Coordinates	Capacity	Year completed	Owner	Notes
Donsin Solar Power Station	Loumbila	12°35′02″N 01°25′48″W	25 MW	2026 (expected)	Government of Burkina Faso	
Kodeni Solar Power Station	Bobo-Dioulasso	11°06′59″N 04°22′34″W	38 MW	December 2023	Kodeni Solar SASU	
Nagreongo Solar Power Station	Nagréongo	12°28′32″N 01°12′14″W	30 MW	July 2022	SPES Ouagadougou	
Pâ Solar Power Station	Pâ	11°33′52″N 03°15′38″W	30 MW	December 2023	Pâ Solar Consortium	
Zagtouli Solar Power Station	Zagtouli	12°24′47″N 01°32′54″W	33 MW	November 2017	Cegelec	
Zina Solar Power Station	Zina, Boucle du Mouhoun Region	12°12′40″N 02°50′07″W	26.6 MW	May 2024	Zina Solaire	

== See also ==
- List of power stations in Africa
- List of largest power stations in the world
- Energy in Burkina Faso
