= Singou massacre =

Mass murder in Burkina Faso

- Part of the Siege of Madjoari of the jihadist insurgency in Burkina Faso
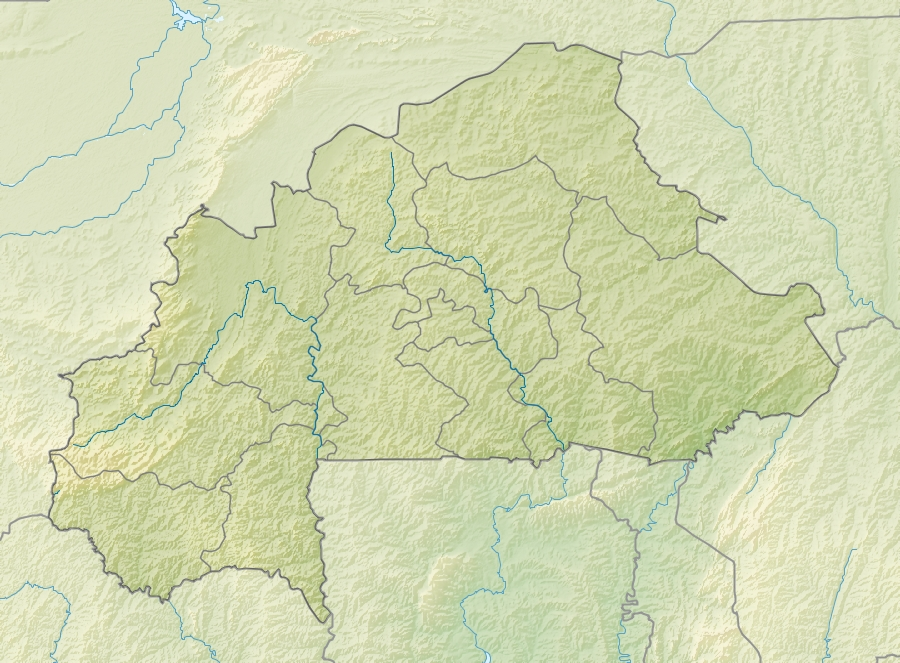
- Singou massacre (Burkina Faso)
- Location: 11°28′41″N 01°14′51″E; Singou, Kompienga Province, Burkina Faso
- Date: 25 May 2022
- Target: Men fleeing Madjoari and Tabarga
- Deaths: 50+
- Injuries: Unknown
- Perpetrators: Ansarul Islam and Jama'at Nasr al-Islam wal Muslimin
- Motive: Revenge for a heavy death toll during an attack on the military base in Madjoari a week prior

On 25 May 2022, jihadists from Ansarul Islam or Jama'at Nasr al-Islam wal-Muslimin attacked civilians fleeing the towns of Madjoari and Tabarga, Kompienga Province, Burkina Faso during the siege of Madjoari. The jihadists intercepted the refugees near the town of Singou, and separated the men from the women, elderly, and children. Over fifty civilians were executed by the jihadists, and fifty more were alleged to be missing. The massacre was the culmination of an offensive that began several weeks prior, with jihadists killing seventeen civilians in Madjoari on May 14 and overrunning the Burkinabe base in the town on May 19.

== Background ==
Since February 2021, jihadists from Ansarul Islam and Jama'at Nasr al-Islam wal-Muslimin have besieged the town of Madjoari, the capital of the department of the same name, blocking food and supplies from entering. The siege sparked a civilian exodus, and only 900 people remained in Madjoari at the time of the attack from the original 15,000. In late May, the jihadist groups intensified their siege, killing seventeen civilians on May 14 and overrunning the military base in the town on May 19. 11 Burkinabe soldiers were killed in the attack on the base, and over seventy jihadists were killed.

== Attack ==
A resident of Madjoari told Le Monde that after the attack on the base, jihadists held a meeting in villages in the department they controlled, vowing revenge on the residents of Madjoari for the deaths of seventy of their comrades during the assault on the Burkinabe base. At that same time, Burkinabe forces began convoys to extract the remaining civilians from Madjoari.

The massacre occurred on May 25, near the town of Singou. A group of civilians fleeing Madjoari and the besieged town of Tabarga were intercepted by jihadists while en route to Nadiagou. A survivor stated that the jihadists separated the men from the women, elderly, and children, and began questioning the men. Men who didn't answer were shot on the road, and the rest were taken into the bush to be executed. The survivor stated that another fifty civilians are missing as well. Only four people survived the massacre, reaching Nenougou.

The number of people killed in the massacre is unknown, as all men who fled Madjoari were killed, and the number of men who fled is unknown. Wounded victims were evacuated to Diapaga for treatment.

== Reactions ==
The killing was condemned by UN Secretary-General António Guterres, whose spokesman issued a statement expressing Guterres's condolences to the families of the victims and reaffirming the United Nations' commitment to aiding Burkina Faso in managing the country's security situation.

The Egyptian Foreign Ministry also condemned the killing and reaffirmed Egypt's "full solidarity" with Burkina Faso in its effort to combat the terrorist groups.

The Islamic State in the Greater Sahara killed over a hundred civilians in the Seytenga massacre on June 11where they also besieged the city and assaulted the army base before killing civilians going door-to-door.
