= Siege of Madjoari =

- Part of Jihadist insurgency in Burkina Faso
Date	February 2021 – May 25, 2022
Location	Madjoari, Kompienga Province, Burkina Faso
Result	Jihadist victory: Madjoari falls under jihadist control after offensive in late May; Singou massacre

Belligerents
Burkina Faso; Burkina Faso Armed Forces; Volunteers for the Defense of the Homeland	Ansarul Islam; Jama'at Nasr al-Islam wal Muslimin

Casualties and losses
12+ killed 22+ injured	15 killed (May 19 attack only, per Burkina Faso); 70+ killed (May 19 attack only, per survivor)
- 77+ killed 50+ missing 15,000+ displaced (100% of Madjoari)

The siege of Madjoari began in February 2021 and lasted until May 25, 2022, as part of the jihadist insurgency in Burkina Faso. Jihadists from Ansarul Islam and Jama'at Nasr al-Islam wal-Muslimin began attacking the city, controlled by Burkinabe forces and the pro-government Volunteers for the Defense of the Homeland (VDP), and ambushed Burkinabe troops and cut off supply lines. Civilians in Madjoari starved, and almost all of them fled to elsewhere in Burkina Faso or to Benin. In May 2022, as the siege came to an end, the jihadists overran the Burkinabe military base and then massacred over fifty civilians fleeing in the Singou massacre.

== Background ==
Since 2015, Burkina Faso has been embroiled in an insurgency by the Mali-based Jama'at Nasr al-Islam wal-Muslimin, the Niger-based Islamic State in the Greater Sahara (ISGS), and the homegrown Burkinabe Ansarul Islam. These insurgent groups began besieging government-controlled towns starting with Arbinda in 2019, and by early 2022 dozens of towns, including provincial capitals, were under siege by JNIM and Ansarul Islam. Sieges became the modus operandi of these groups beginning in 2022, and jihadists often attacked civilians fleeing the areas while also preventing supplies and food from going in and out.

In the early 2020s, JNIM, Ansarul Islam, and ISGS expanded into the southeast of Burkina Faso having been concentrated in the north and northeast for years. When JNIM began expanding to the southeast, they used the siege tactic to create buffer zones of displaced residents so that they didn't have to govern as many residents in an area. When the siege of Madjoari began in February 2021, many villages in Madjoari Department were already under JNIM control.

== Siege ==
=== Civilian displacement and beginning (February 2021 - May 2022) ===
Prior to the siege, Madjoari had a population of between 14,000 and 15,000. Amnesty International puts the start of the siege at February 2021, although a protester against the siege interviewed by VOA Africa stated in July 2021 that the town had already been under siege for over a year. On June 29, 2021, the jihadists issued an ultimatum to the chief of Madjoari that if the town's population did not flee, the jihadists would destroy the town and everyone in it. In the ultimatum, the jihadists threatened to blow up the Singou bridge that connects the town to Kompienga, the provincial capital of Kompienga Province where Madjoari is located.

By July 2021, only a thousand residents of Madjoari remained of the original 15,000 or so. Madjoari and the nearby town of Tambarga were the only two places not under direct jihadist control. Many residents fled across the border to Benin. On July 22, a Burkinabe soldier was killed by an IED during a sweeping operation in the forest around Madjoari. Two other soldiers were injured in the explosion. Throughout the rest of 2021 and the first half of 2022, JNIM and Ansarul Islam continued their attacks on civilians and soldiers in Madjoari, with ACLED describing Madjoari department as "the largest buffer zone that JNIM has established."

=== Intensification ===
JNIM and Ansarul Islam intensified their attacks on Madjoari in early May 2022. On May 14, jihadists entered the town and killed seventeen people. Five days later on May 19, they led an assault on the Burkinabe military base in Madjoari, which was staffed by Burkinabe forces and VDP militiamen. The base was shelled first, and then the assault began with heavy fighting. 11 Burkinabe soldiers were killed in the battle, and twenty more were wounded. The battle was halted by Burkinabe planes bombing the area, forcing the jihadists to retreat and killing about fifteen fighters. The jihadists, however, were able to overrun the military base which Burkinabe officials called the "last bastion" of the department.

Following the battle at the military base, around 900 civilians remained in Madjoari. However, the remaining civilians fled within the next week, some evacuations organized by remaining Burkinabe soldiers and VDP. On May 25, 2022, jihadists kidnapped over fifty people fleeing Madjoari and Tambarga on a road outside the city near Singou. The refugees were fleeing towards Nadiagou. All of the victims were men, mostly young men, and they were taken into the bushes and shot by the jihadists. Only women, children, and elderly were spared, although there were only four in the group to begin with. A survivor of the siege and massacre stated that around fifty more civilians are missing. Another survivor of the siege added that the massacre was retaliation for the jihadist's failure to capture all of Madjoari during their assault on the base. The jihadists had had meeting in villages in the department, seeking to enact revenge for the deaths of seventy of their comrades killed during the battle.
