= Donsin Solar Power Station =

Solar farm in Burkina Faso

- Country: Burkina Faso
- Location: Loumbila, Oubritenga Province, Plateau-Central Region
- Coordinates: 12°35′02″N 01°25′48″W
- Status: Proposed
- Construction began: 2024 (expected)
- Commission date: 2026 (expected)
- Construction cost: €45.7 million (US$49.2 million)
- Owner: Government of Burkina Faso

Solar farm
- Type: Flat-panel PV

Power generation
- Nameplate capacity: 25 MW (34,000 hp)

The Donsin Solar Power Station is a 25 megawatts solar power plant under development in Burkina Faso. The power station is owned and is being developed by the Government of Burkina Faso, through the Ministry of Energy, Mines and Quarries. The off-taker of the power generated here is Société Nationale d'électricité du Burkina Faso (SONABEL), the Burkinabe national electricity utility company. The project received funding support, in the form of a €45.7 million concessional loan from the Export-Import Bank of China.

== Location ==
The power station would occupy a piece of real estate on the premises of Donsin International Airport, in Loumbila, Oubritenga Province, in the Plateau-Central Region. This is approximately 38 kilometres (24 mi) northeast of Ouagadougou, the country's capital city.

== Overview ==
The power station's generation capacity is 25 megawatts. Its output is to be sold directly to SONABEL for integration into the national electricity grid. The design calls for an attached 5 MW/20 MWh battery storage power station (BESS).

== Funding and timeline ==
The Import-Export Bank of China agreed to make a €45.7 million (US$49.2 million or 30 billion CFA francs) soft loan available to the Burkinabe government for the purpose of building this renewable energy infrastructure project. Construction is expected to commence later in 2024 and conclude 15 months later.

== Other considerations ==
As of April 2024 the Burkina Faso national electricity generation capacity was reported as 714.4 MW. Another 200 MW to 300 MW extra is imported, from Ivory Coast and Ghana, to meet national demand. This power station will enable the country reduce the electricity import bill.

== See also ==
- List of power stations in Burkina Faso
- Pâ Solar Power Station
