= Tenkodogo Solar Power Station =

Solar power station in Burkina Faso

- Country: Burkina Faso
- Location: Tenkodogo, Boulgou Province, Centre-Est Region
- Coordinates: 11°48′56″N 00°28′27″W
- Status: Under construction
- Commission date: 2023 Expected
- Construction cost: US$30 million

Solar farm
- Type: Flat-panel PV

Power generation
- Nameplate capacity: 24 MW (32,000 hp)
- Annual net output: 48 GWh

The Tenkodogo Power Station, also Zano Solar Power Station, is a 28 MW (38,000 hp) solar power plant in Burkina Faso. The solar farm is under development by a special purpose vehicle (SPV) company called Quadran Burkina Faso S.A. (Zano), created by the owners, to design, finance, build, own, operate and maintain the power station. The energy off-taker is Société Nationale d'électricité du Burkina Faso (SONABEL), the national electricity utility parastatal company, under a long-term power purchase agreement.

== Location ==
The power station would be located in Zano Village, near the town of Tenkodogo, in Boulgou Province, in the Centre-Est Region of the country. Tenkodogo is located approximately 185 kilometres (115 mi) southeast of the city of Ouagadougou, the national capital.

== Overview ==
The power station has a 24 megawatt capacity. Its output will be sold directly to the SONABEL for integration into the national grid. It has been estimated that the energy generated here could power approximately 75,000 Burkinabe households. The power station, which consists of 54,500 photovoltaic panels, generates 48 GWh annually.

== Developers ==
The power station is owned and is under development by the SPV company called Quadran Burkina Faso S.A. The table below illustrates the shareholding in Quadran Burkina Faso S.A.

Shareholding In Quadran Burkina Faso S.A.
Rank	Shareholder	Domicile	Percentage	Notes
1	MIHIA Holding	France	70	
2	Syscom Network	?	30	
	Total		100.00	

- MIHIA ("Make It Happen In Africa") is a joint venture between Qair, a French IPP (51 percent) and Stoa Infrastructure & Energy (STOA), a French financial house (49 percent ownership).
- STOA is jointly owned by Caisse des Dépôts et Consignations (CDC) (83.3 percent ownership) and French Development Agency (AFD) (16.7 percent ownership).

== Costs, funding, and commissioning ==
The cost of construction has been reported as €25.7 million (approx. US$30 million). Funding has been provided by a number of development partners, including (1) FMO (Netherlands) (2) Access to Energy Fund (AEF) (3) Proparco. It is anticipated that he completed power station will come online during the second half of 2022.

== See also ==
- List of power stations in Burkina Faso
- Kodeni Solar Power Station
