= Zina Solar Power Station =

Solar farm in Burkina Faso

- Country: Burkina Faso
- Location: Zina, Bankui Region
- Coordinates: 12°12′40″N 02°50′07″W
- Status: Operational
- Construction began: 2022
- Commission date: May 2024
- Construction cost: US$42.5 million
- Owner: Zina Solaire
- Operator: Zina Solaire

Solar farm
- Type: Flat-panel PV
- Site area: 70 hectares (170 acres)

Power generation
- Units operational: 85,200
- Nameplate capacity: 26.6 MW (35,700 hp)
- Annual net output: 33 GWh

The Zina Solar Power Station is a 26.6 megawatts solar power plant in Burkina Faso. The power station is owned and was developed by a consortium comprising Amea Power, an independent power producer (IPP) based in the United Arab Emirates, and Windiga Energy, an IPP based in Canada. The energy off-taker for this solar farm is Société Nationale d'électricité du Burkina Faso (SONABEL), the Burkinabe national electricity utility company. A 25-year power purchase agreement governs the terms of the sale of electricity to SONABEL. Financial close for the power station was reached in May 2022.

== Location ==
The power station occupies a piece of real estate measuring 70 hectares (170 acres). The solar park is located in the village of Zina, in the Bankui RegionRegion]] of Burkina Faso, approximately 185 kilometres (115 mi) from Ouagadougou, the country's capital city.

== Overview ==
The power station's generation capacity is 26.6 megawatts. Its output is sold directly to the government of Burkina Faso for integration into the national electricity grid, under a 25-year power purchase agreement. The solar park is operated and maintained by Zina Solaire, the special purpose vehicle company (SPV), created by the station developers, to design, fund, build, own, operate and maintain this power station, for the duration of the PPA. It is expected that the power station will provide electricity to 43,000 residents, and will prevent the emission of 13,200 tonnes of carbon dioxide every year.

== Developers ==
The power station developers formed an ad hoc company to develop, own and operate this power station. They named the ad hoc company Zina Solaire. The ownership of the ad hoc company is as illustrated in the table below.

Shareholding in Zina Solaire
Rank	Shareholder	Domicile	Percentage	Notes
1	Amea Power	United Arab Emirates	90.0	
2	Windiga Energy	Canada	10.0	
	Total		100.0	

== Funding and timeline ==
The table below outlines the sources of funding for the construction of this power station.

Sources of funds for construction of Zina Solar Power Station
Rank	Funding source	Domicile	Notes
1	International Finance Corporation	United States	
2	IFC–Canada Climate Change Program	North America	
3	Emerging Africa Infrastructure Fund (EAIF)	United Kingdom	
4	Zina Solaire	Burkina Faso	
	Total	42.5 million	

Construction began in May 2022. Commercial commissioning was expected in 2023. The completed power station came online in May 2024.

== See also ==
- List of power stations in Burkina Faso
- Pâ Solar Power Station
