= Condominium (international law) =

Form of shared government

A condominium (plural either condominia, as in Latin, or condominiums) in international law is a territory (such as a border area or a state) in or over which multiple sovereign powers formally agree to share equal dominion and exercise their rights jointly, without dividing it into "national" zones.

Although a condominium has always been recognized as a theoretical possibility, condominia have been rare in practice. A major problem, and the reason so few have existed, is the difficulty of ensuring co-operation between the sovereign powers; once the understanding fails, the status is likely to become untenable.

== Etymology ==
The word is recorded in English since 1718, from Modern Latin, apparently coined in Germany c. 1700 from Latin con- 'together' + dominium 'right of ownership' (compare domain). A condominium of three sovereign powers is sometimes called a tripartite condominium or tridominium.

== Current condominia ==
Condominium	Sovereign states responsible	Area (km^{2})	Population	Date created	Notes
Abyei Area	South Sudan; Sudan	10,546	124,390	9 January 2005	The 2005 Comprehensive Peace Agreement, which ended the Second Sudanese Civil War, created the special status administrative area which is considered to simultaneously be part of West Kordofan state and Northern Bahr el Ghazal state. Following the independence of South Sudan in 2011, the area effectively became a condominium between the Republic of South Sudan and the Republic of the Sudan.
Antarctica	(Antarctic Treaty) 29 state parties	14,200,000	1,300–5,100 (seasonal)	1 December 1959	Antarctica is a de facto continental condominium, governed by the 29 state parties to the Antarctic Treaty that have consulting status. Only seven of these state parties have territorial claims.
Brčko District	Bosnia and Herzegovina: Federation of Bosnia and Herzegovina; Republika Srpska	493	83,516	8 March 2000	Subnational condominium of the two entities of Bosnia and Herzegovina created due to its multiethnic nature.
Gulf of Fonseca	El Salvador Honduras; Nicaragua	3,200	0	24 May 1980	El Salvador, Honduras, and Nicaragua exercise a tripartite condominium over parts of the Gulf of Fonseca and of the territorial sea outside its mouth.
Joint Regime Area	Colombia; Jamaica		0	November 1993	As an alternative to delimiting their sea boundary, Colombia and Jamaica share a maritime condominium called the Joint Regime Area in the Caribbean Sea by mutual agreement. The outer portion of the EEZ of each country otherwise would overlap in this area. Unlike other "joint development zones", this condominium appears not to have been purposed simply as a way to divide oil, fisheries or other resources.
Koalou	Benin; Burkina Faso	68	c. 5,000	March 2008	The area is administrated jointly by the "Joint Committee for the Concerted Management of the Kourou/Koalou Area" (COMGEC-K). Neither nation expresses sovereignty over the area, with a permanent solution still pending.
Lake Constance	Austria; Germany; Switzerland	536	0	No official treaty	Austria and Germany consider themselves to hold a tripartite condominium with Switzerland (albeit on different grounds) over the main part of Lake Constance (without its islands). On the other hand, Switzerland holds the view that the border runs through the middle of the lake. Hence, no international treaty establishes where the borders of Switzerland, Germany, and Austria, in or around Lake Constance, lie.
Lake Titicaca	Bolivia; Peru	8,372	0	1987	Lake Titicaca between Bolivia and Peru was originally divided between the two countries. In 1951, however, Peruvian President Manuel A. Odría declared that "waters of Lake Titicaca belong in indivisible condominium to Peru and Bolivia". An agreement from 1955 declares "the indivisible and exclusive joint ownership of both countries of the waters of the lake", while a subsequent agreement from 1957 describes an "indivisible and exclusive condominium over the waters of Lake Titicaca". However, while these agreements were initially signed in the 1950s, they were not ratified by Bolivia until 1987.
Moselle	Germany; Luxembourg	0.723	0	1816	The Moselle and its tributaries, the Sauer and the Our, constitute a condominium between Germany and Luxembourg, which also includes bridges, about 15 river islands of varying size, and the tip of one island, Staustufe Apach, near Schengen (the rest of the island is in France).
MOU 74 Box	Australia; Indonesia	50,000	0	1974	Officially known as the Australia–Indonesia Memorandum of Understanding, the MOU 74 Box was established by a bilateral agreement regarding the Operations of Indonesian Traditional Fishermen in Areas of the Australian Fishing Zone and Continental Shelf – 1974. The agreement recognizes access rights of traditional Indonesian fishers from Rote Ndao Regency in shared waters to the north of Australia with regard to the long history of traditional Indonesian fishing there, especially for trepang, trochus, abalone and sponges. The MOU 74 Box includes the Ashmore and Cartier Islands, Browse Island, and Scott and Seringapatam Reefs.
Paraná River	Brazil; Paraguay		0	13 August 1973	The Paraná River between Brazil and Paraguay, starting from the former location of the Guaíra Falls (now the location of the Itaipu Dam) to the mouth of the Iguazu River, was declared a condominium so that the two countries could jointly utilize the river for the production of hydroelectric power. The 1973 treaty establishing the condominium created a binational governing entity called ITAIPU, made up of both Brazilian and Paraguayan officials.
Pheasant Island	France; Spain	0.00682	0	1659	Pheasant Island is an island of the Bidassoa. Established as part of the Treaty of the Pyrenees, It is formally administered by Spain between 1 February and 31 July each year (181 or 182 days) and by France between 1 August and 31 January each year (184 days).
Río de la Plata	Argentina; Uruguay	35,500	0	19 November 1973	Signed in Montevideo the 1973 Boundary Treaty between Uruguay and Argentina defined the geographical limits of the Rio de la Plata and created a joint jurisdiction regime. Beyond 7 nautical miles off the river shores sovereignty is shared between the two countries with a boundary line defined only to be applicable to the riverbed and subsoil resources.
Tort-Kocho	Kyrgyzstan; Tajikistan		0	13 March 2025	Tort-Kocho is a road which connects the Tajikistani Vorukh exclave in Kyrgyzstan to the rest of Tajikistan. Prior to 2025, both the Kyrgyz and Tajikistani considered the road part of their sovereign territory. The road was contested during the 2021 Kyrgyzstan–Tajikistan clashes when Tajik administrators blocked the Osh–Batken–Isfana road demanding the Tort-Kocho road be unblocked by Kyrgyzstan. As part of the 2025 delimitation of the Kyrgyzstan–Tajikistan border, the 10 m (33 ft) wide roadbed and a 15 m (49 ft) "security zone" were declared neutral territory, with Kyrgyzstani politician Kamchybek Tashiev saying the road will not belong to "either the Kyrgyz or Tajik side".
Yacyretá Dam	Argentina; Paraguay		0	27 March 1974	The Treaty of Yacyretá, signed 1973 and coming into force 1974, establishes joint governance between Argentina and Paraguay of the Yacyretá Dam in the Paraná River. It states that "the installations of the hydroelectric scheme and their auxiliary works, together with the installations for the improvement of navigability on the River Parana. . .shall constitute a condominium, with equal shares, of both the High Contracting Parties".

== Co-principality ==
Under French law, Andorra was once considered to be a French–Spanish condominium, although it is more commonly classed as a co-principality, since it is itself a sovereign state, not a possession of one or more foreign powers. However, the position of head of state is shared ex officio by two foreigners, one of whom is the President of France, currently Emmanuel Macron, and the other the Bishop of Urgell in Spain, currently Josep-Lluís Serrano Pentinat.

== Former condominia ==
- Allied-occupied Germany from 1945 until 1949 and Berlin after that until 1991 were under the control of the Allied Control Council, which consisted of representatives from Britain, France, the Soviet Union and the United States.
- In 688 the Byzantine Emperor Justinian II and the Umayyad Caliph Abd al-Malik ibn Marwan reached an unprecedented agreement to establish a condominium (the concept did not yet exist) over Cyprus, with the collected taxes from the island being equally divided between the two parties. The arrangement lasted for some 300 years, even though in the same time there was nearly constant warfare between the two parties on the mainland.
- Fellesdistriktet (Norwegian: Fellesdistriktet, literally "The common area", Russian: Общий район) was a Russo-Norwegian condominium comprising Sør-Varanger Municipality and the Pechengsky District from 1684 until 1826.
  Flags of the Anglo-Egyptian Sudan (1899–1956)
- Anglo-Egyptian Sudan was legally an Egyptian-British condominium from 1899 until 1956, although de facto, the Khedivate, Sultanate, and Kingdom of Egypt played no role in its government other than providing some administrators in the country: all political decisions were made by the United Kingdom and all Governors-General of Anglo-Egyptian Sudan were British. The system was resented by Egyptian and Sudanese nationalists, and would later be disavowed by the Egyptian Government, although it persisted due to the United Kingdom's effective control over Egypt itself, which began from 1882 and continued until at least 1936.
- The Colony of Caiena and Guiana became a condominium between Brazil and Portugal upon the elevation of Brazil to the status of an equal kingdom in 1815 until the return of the territory to France in 1817.
- The Condominium of Bosnia and Herzegovina was jointly ruled by Cisleithanian Austria and Transleithanian Hungary between 1908 and 1918, while both countries were parts of the Austro-Hungarian Empire.
- An islet in the border river Brömsebäck was considered to belong to neither (or both) Denmark and Sweden.
- The Duchy of Courland was a condominium of the Grand Duchy of Lithuania and the Crown of Poland from 1726 until 1795.
- The Independent State of Croatia during World War II from 1941 to 1943 was a military condominium of Nazi Germany and Fascist Italy until 1943, when Italy split between the Allied-leaning Kingdom of Italy under King Victor Emmanuel III and Axis-leaning Italian Social Republic under Benito Mussolini.
- Canton and Enderbury Islands were a British–American condominium from 1939 until 1979 when they became part of Kiribati.
- Couto Misto was shared until 1864 between Spain and Portugal, even though in its final decades of existence it was de facto independent.
- Egypt from 1876 to 1882 was under France and the United Kingdom.
- A small area (Hadf and surroundings) on the Arabian Peninsula, a part of Oman, at one time was jointly ruled with the Emirate of Ajman, one of the Trucial States and later a member of the United Arab Emirates. The agreement defining the Hadf zone was signed in Salalah on 26 April 1960 by Sultan Said bin Taimur and in Ajman on 30 April 1960 by Shaikh Rashid bin Humaid Al Nuaimi III, ruler of Ajman. This provided for some joint supervision in the zone by the ruler of Ajman and the shaikhs under the rule of Muscat. It allowed the Ajman ruler to continue collecting zakat (Islamic tax). The ruler of Ajman was, however, not to interfere in the affairs of the local people, the Bani Ka'ab (a branch of the Banu Kaab), which were the sole responsibility of shaikhs who were under Muscat rule. The agreement was later terminated.
- The Holy Roman Empire hosted numerous condominia within its boundaries. Many princes and especially Imperial knights and counts mortgaged partial ownership or rights within their lands to the Emperor, sometimes in perpetuity. Most of these were located in the Swabian Circle, close to the Emperor's personal domains in Further Austria. Some condominia were shared by lesser princes, especially in cases of inheritances held in common by branches of a princely line. Disputes over condominium contracts were submitted to the Imperial court at Wetzlar, or petitioned to the Emperor himself. Some cases within the Holy Roman Empire included the following:
  - The City of Bergedorf was a condominium of the Imperial cities of Hamburg and Lübeck, and the terms were extended beyond the Holy Roman Empire's dissolution until 1868, when Lübeck sold its rights in Bergedorf to Hamburg.
  - The City of Erfurt from the 12th century until the Thirty Years' War was shared between the Archbishopric of Mainz and the counts of Gleichen, the latter replaced by the city council in 1289 (Concordata Gebhardi), the Landgrave of Thuringia in 1327 and the House of Wettin in 1483 (Treaty of Weimar).
  - The County of Friesland (West Frisia) was from 1165 to 1493 a joint condominium of the County of Holland and the Prince-Bishopric of Utrecht, then again until 25 October 1555 under Imperial administration.
  - The Imperial village of Holzhausen was a partial condominium, two thirds of which was immediate to the Emperor and the remaining third subject to various landlords.
  - The city of Maastricht was a condominium for five centuries until 1794. It was shared between the Prince-Bishopric of Liège and the Duchy of Brabant, the latter replaced by the Dutch Republic in 1632.
  - The village of Nennig was a condominium of the Electorate of Trier, the Duchy of Lorraine (the Kingdom of France from 1766), and the Duchy of Luxembourg until its annexation by Revolutionary France in 1794.
  - The County of Sponheim was ruled since the 15th century by the Margraves of Baden, the Counts Palatine of the Rhine and the Counts of Veldenz, later Palatinate-Simmern, Palatine Zweibrücken and Palatinate-Birkenfeld as heirs of Veldenz.
  - The "common bailiwicks" were shared between multiple cantons of the Old Swiss Confederacy continuing after their independence from the Holy Roman Empire to the French invasion in 1798.
- The Free City of Kraków was a protectorate of Prussia, Austria and Russia from 1815 until 1846, when it was annexed by Austria.
- Neutral Moresnet was shared from 1816 until 1919 between the Netherlands (later Belgium) and Prussia.
- Nauru was a tripartite condominium mandate territory administered by Australia, New Zealand and the United Kingdom from 1923 to 1942 and again in 1947 as a UN trust territory until independence in 1968.
  1966 flag of the colonial New Hebrides
- New Hebrides formed a French–British condominium in 1906 until independence in 1980 as a republic, now called Vanuatu.
- Northern Dobruja was shared by the Central Powers (Germany, Austria-Hungary, and Bulgaria) during World War I.
- The Oregon Country was an Anglo-American condominium from 1818 until 1846. It would later become the Pacific Northwest of the United States and British Columbia in Canada.
- The Samoan Islands from 1889 to 1899 were a rare tripartite condominium under joint protectorate of Germany, the United Kingdom and the United States. It would later become Samoa and American Samoa.
- Schleswig, Holstein and Lauenburg were an Austrian–Prussian condominium. The two German powers acceded to it following the 1864 Second Schleswig War. According to the Gastein Convention in the next year, Lauenburg left the condominium (to Prussia), Austria governed Holstein and Prussia controlled Schleswig. In 1866, after the Austro-Prussian War, Austria passed over its remaining rights to Prussia. Prussia later created the Province of Schleswig-Holstein, which would become divided between Germany and Denmark after the Treaty of Versailles.
- The Spanish Netherlands became an Anglo-Dutch condominium in 1706 during the War of the Spanish Succession, until the peace treaties of Utrecht and Rastatt in 1713/14 ending the war.
- Togoland, formerly a German protectorate, was an Anglo-French condominium, from when the United Kingdom and France occupied it on 26 August 1914 until its partition on 27 December 1916 into French and British zones. The divided Togoland became two separate League of Nations mandates on 20 July 1922: British Togoland, which joined Gold Coast (present-day Ghana) in 1956, and French Togoland, which is now the nation of Togo.
- The Zaporozhian Sich, a brief condominium between Russia and Poland-Lithuania, was established in 1667 by the Treaty of Andrusovo.
- Tangier International Zone, an international zone, was nominally under Moroccan sovereignty but jointly administered by several European powers in 1924. It was returned to full Moroccan sovereignty in 1956.
- The term is sometimes applied to a similar arrangement between members of a monarch's countries in (personal or formal) union, as was the case for the district of Fiume (what is today Rijeka, Republic of Croatia), shared between Hungary and Croatia within the Habsburg Empire since 1868.
- Between 1913 and 1920 Spitsbergen was a neutral condominium. The Spitsbergen Treaty of 9 February 1920 recognises the full and absolute sovereignty of Norway over all of the Arctic archipelago of Svalbard. The exercise of sovereignty is, however, subject to certain stipulations, and not all Norwegian law applies. Originally limited to nine signatory nations, over 40 are now signatories of the treaty. Citizens of any of the signatory countries may settle in the archipelago. Currently, only Norway and Russia make use of this right.
- In 1992, South Africa and Namibia established a Joint Administrative Authority in the enclave of Walvis Bay, prior to its cession to Namibia in 1994.
- The Saudi Arabian–Kuwaiti neutral zone was established in 1922 by the Uqair Convention. It was a 2,000 square mile area designed to accommodate the Bedouin people, a nomadic group who regularly crossed through the Saudi and Kuwaiti border. The area was partitioned in 1970 after a 1938 discovery of oil near the zone brought speculation that there may be oil in the condominium.
- The Saudi Arabian–Iraqi neutral zone

== Proposed condominia ==
- In a 2019 essay, former Australian Prime Minister Kevin Rudd suggested that Australia should consider a "formal constitutional condominium" with Kiribati, Nauru, and Tuvalu as a solution to the impacts of climate change. Rudd outlined that the people of these countries would be offered Australian citizenship and relocation to Australian territory in exchange for Australian ownership of their territorial seas, exclusive economic zones, and fisheries.
- In 2001, the British government held discussions with Spain with a view to putting a proposal for joint sovereignty to the people of Gibraltar. This initiative was pre-emptively rejected by Gibraltarians in the 2002 referendum.
- In 2012, the Canadian and Danish governments were close to an agreement to declare Hans Island a condominium, after decades in dispute. In June 2022, the Danish, Greenlandic, Canadian, and Nunavut governments instead decided to divide the island in half.
- In the talks between the UK and the People's Republic of China in 1983–84 over the transfer of sovereignty over Hong Kong, one of the British proposals was to transfer the sovereignty of Hong Kong and its dependencies to the People's Republic of China while the UK would retain the rights of administration of the territory. The proposal was rejected and negotiations ended with the UK agreeing to relinquish all rights over Hong Kong to China in 1997.
- In 1984, the New Ireland Forum suggested a proposal for joint UK/Irish authority in Northern Ireland to try to bring an end to the Troubles conflict. This idea was dismissed by the British government. The Good Friday Agreement of 1998 led to the establishment of a devolved power-sharing Northern Ireland Executive led jointly by the First Minister and Deputy First Minister, positions nominated separately by the largest parties in each of the two largest community designations in the assembly. The proposal of joint authority by the UK and Irish governments over Northern Ireland was raised again in 2017 after the Irish backstop issue during the negotiations for the Brexit withdrawal agreement and the collapse of the power-sharing executive during the Renewable Heat Incentive scandal.
- During the Croatian War of Independence speculative ideas on the peaceful settlement of the conflict included condominium proposals. In 1991 Serbian lawyer Smilja Avramov presented to Croatian negotiators her condominium proposal for the Serb controlled areas. In the later stages of war, in 1994 and 1995, United Kingdom diplomats circulated their territory swap proposals which included the idea on the creation of condominium between Croatia and FR Yugoslavia (Serbia and Montenegro) over the self-proclaimed Eastern Slavonia, Baranja and Western Syrmia. Croatian Minister of Foreign Affairs Mate Granić subsequently claimed that the idea was rejected by him in 1994.

== See also ==
- CoDominium – a fictional political alliance and union between the United States of America and a revitalized Soviet Union that rules Earth and space
- Concurrent jurisdiction
- Corpus separatum
- Dependent territory
- Free city (disambiguation)
- International city
- Party wall in common law
- Principality
- Protectorate
- Suzerainty
- Terra nullius
- Transboundary protected area
