= Dassari =

Dassari may refer to:

- Dassari, Benin, a town and arrondissement in the Atakora Department of Benin
- Dassari, Burkina Faso, a village in the Manni Department of Gnagna Province in Burkina Faso
- Dassari, Togo, a hamlet in the Virgonia prefecture of Zagrovia county in Togo.
