= Nagreongo Solar Power Station =

Solar farm in Oubritenga, Burkina Faso

- Country: Burkina Faso
- Location: Nagréongo, Oubritenga Province, Plateau-Central Region
- Coordinates: 12°28′32″N 01°12′14″W
- Status: Under construction
- Construction began: November 2020
- Commission date: July 2022
- Owner: SPES Ouagadougou
- Operator: SPES Ouagadougou

Solar farm
- Type: Flat-panel PV

Power generation
- Nameplate capacity: 30 MW (40,000 hp)
- Annual net output: 50 GWh

The Nagreongo Solar Power Station, also Nagréongo Solar Power Station, is a 30 MW (40,000 hp) solar power in Burkina Faso. The solar farm, which was commissioned in July 2022, was developed by the French IPP, GreenYellow, a subsidiary of the Casino Group. The energy generated here is sold to the Burkinabe electricity utility company SONABEL (Société Nationale d'électricité du Burkina Faso) (English: National Electricity Company of Burkina Faso), under a 25-year power purchase agreement (PPA).

== Location ==
The power station is located on 50 hectares (120 acres), in the town of Nagréongo, in Oubritenga Province, in the Plateau-Central Region of the country. Nagréongo is located approximately 18.5 kilometres (11 mi), by road southeast of Ziniaré, the provincial headquarters. This is approximately 38 kilometres (24 mi), northeast of Ouagadougou, the capital and largest city in Burkina Faso.

== Overview ==
Burkina Faso's generation capacity is reported as 357 megawatts, as of October 2021. This power station is expected to add 30 megawatts, equivalent to 50 GWh of green renewable energy, also avoiding the emission of 27,500 tons of carbon dioxide equivalent annually.

The development involved the installation of 70,000 photo voltaic solar panels, together with transformers and inverters. Other infrastructure developments include maintenance buildings, a control room, offices and an electric switchyard. At the switchyard, the energy is stepped up to 33 kiloVolts (33kV) and transmitted via overhead transmission lines for 21 kilometres (13 mi), to a SONABEL substation in Ziniaré, where the electricity enters the national grid. The power station achieved commercial commissioning on 7 July 2022.

== Developers ==
The power station was developed by a consortium led by GreenYellow, a French IPP and subsidiary of the Casino Group, in partnership with a group of financiers and donors referred to as the Africa Energy Coopération (AEC). The developer/owners of the power station formed a special purpose ad hoc vehicle company to own and operate the solar farm. The SPV is called Société de production d’énergie solaire de Ouagadougou SAS (SPES Ouagadougou). A 25-year power purchase agreement was executed between SPES Ouagadougou and SONABEL.

In February 2024, GreenYellow sold its ownership in this power station to the Axian Group domiciled in Madagascar.

== Funding ==
The construction costs are reported as US$30 million. The table below outlines the funding sources for this renewable energy project. The Multilateral Investment Guarantee Agency, a member of the World Bank Group provided risk insurance for the owner/developers, for the first 20 years of the power plant's operation at a price of US$4.5 million.

Sources of funding for Nagreongo Solar Power Station
Rank	Source	Amount in € (m)	Equivalent in US$ (m)	Percentage	Notes
1	FMO (Netherlands)	21.0	24.3	70.0	
2	World Bank Group				
3	French Development Agency				
	Total	30.0	34.7	100.0	

== See also ==
- List of power stations in Burkina Faso
