= Kodeni Solar Power Station =

Solar farm in Houet, Burkina Faso

- Country: Bobo-Dioulasso, Houet Province, Burkina Faso
- Coordinates: 11°06′59″N 04°22′34″W
- Status: Operational
- Construction began: October 2021
- Commission date: December 2023
- Construction cost: €41 million
- Owner: Africa Ren
- Operator: Kodeni Solar SASU

Solar farm
- Type: Flat-panel PV

Power generation
- Nameplate capacity: 38 MW (51,000 hp)
- Annual net output: 73 GWh

Kodeni Solar Power Station, is a 38 MW (51,000 hp) solar power plant in Burkina Faso. The solar farm was development by the French IPP, Africa Ren, with funding from European financial institutions, led by FMO Entrepreneurial Development Bank of the Netherlands. Société Nationale d'électricité du Burkina Faso (SONABEL), the state-owned electricity utility company signed a 25-year power purchase agreement (PPA), with Koden Solar SASU, the special purpose vehicle company established by the owners to own, develop, operate and maintain the solar farm. The power station reached commercial commissioning in December 2023.

== Location ==
The development is located near the city of Bobo-Dioulasso, the second-largest city in Burkina Faso. Bobo-Dioulasso is located in the Hauts-Bassins Region of the Houet Province, approximately 356 kilometres (221 mi) by road, southwest of Ouagadougou, the capital and largest city in the country.

== Overview ==
The power station is under development by Africa Ren, a French IPP headquartered in Paris, France. Africa Ren, the sole owner, has incorporated a subsidiary in Mauritius, Africa Ren Invest Limited, an independent power producer (IPP) that is active in West Africa. Kodeni Solar SASU is a special purpose vehicle company established under Burkinabe jurisdiction to own, develop, operate and maintain this power station.

The energy generated at this plant is sold to SONABEL, the national electricity company of Burkina Faso, for integration in the national power grid. A 25-year power purchase agreement has been signed between SONABEL and the solar farm developers.

== Funding ==
The cost of construction is reported to be €41 million (US$47.7 million). The table below illustrates the funding sources for Kodeni Solar Power Station.

Kodeni Solar Power Station funding
Rank	Funder	Amount € (millions)	Percentage	Notes
1	FMO (Netherlands)	11.97	29.19	Loan
2	Interact Climate Change Facility (ICCF)	12.30	30.00	Loan
3	Access to Energy Fund (AEF)	8.10	19.76	Loan
4	Africa Ren	8.63	21.05	Equity
	Total	41.00	100.00	

== Other considerations ==
The engineering, procurement and construction (EPC) contract was awarded to INEO by EQUANS, a subsidiary of the Engie Group.

Annual energy generation at this power station is calculated at 73 GWh, sufficient to power 115,000 Burkinabe homes. It will also avoid the emission of 41,000 tons of carbon dioxide every year.

150 construction jobs are expected to be created. After construction, 35 permanent employees will be required to operate the solar farm.

== See also ==
- List of power stations in Burkina Faso
- Tenkodogo Solar Power Station
