= Koalou =

Koalou/Kourou Area with special administrative status
- Location in Burkina Faso
- Coordinates: 11.0230071°N 0.9398357°E
- Country: Benin; Burkina Faso

Government
  - Type: neutral zone
  - Body: Joint Committee for the Concerted Management of the Kourou/Koalou Area (COMGEC-K)
  - Chairman: Lydie Déré Chabi Nah (Benin)
  - Chairman: Amidou Sorè (Burkina Faso)

Population
  - Total: ~5,000

Koalou, also known as Kourou, is a neutral zone between Benin and Burkina Faso containing the villages of Koalou, Niorgou I, and Niorgou II. The 68 km^{2} area of land is near the tripoint border with Togo and has been the subject of a dispute between the two countries for years. For Benin, the zone is part of the commune of Matéri in the department of Atakora; for Burkina Faso, the zone is part of the department of Pama in the province of Kompienga. The two countries chose to settle the issue peacefully in 2008 by removing all displayed symbols of sovereignty from both countries.

Since 2009, the area has been administered by the Joint Committee for the Concerted Management of the Kourou/Koalou Area (COMGEC-K). The committee is composed of 14 members from each country and is led by two chairmen.

Due to the delicate legal situation of the area, there is a lack of security as both Burkinabe and Benin forces have deserted the area in order to avoid a diplomatic incident. The hole left by the security forces has caused Koalou/Kourou to become an epicentre of an illicit cross-border fuel trade. It has also allowed al-Qaeda-affiliated groups to operate gold mines in the area and to tax smugglers. The problem has been slightly reduced following a crackdown on the area by Beninese troops in 2023. However, it did not come without controversy from Burkina Faso.

== History ==
=== Colonial era ===
In 1914, France declared that the border between Burkina Faso (then part of Upper Senegal and Niger) and Benin (then French Dahomey) followed the Pendjari River. According to this definition, the area would be a part of Burkina Faso. However, a document signed by a colonial administrator in 1938 placed the area within the boundary of present-day Benin.

=== Post-independence ===
In 2005, the two countries came close to conflict when the headmaster of a school built by Burkina Faso in the contested zone was expelled by Benin. The tension was so great that a meeting between the two to delimit the border was cancelled.

In 2007, tensions flared up once again when an inhabitant of the contested area was sent to prison in Benin where he later died.

On 7 March 2008, the two countries agreed to meet after local officials in the area accused unidentified security forces of harassing people living there. In order to prevent security breaches and protect the civilians in the area, the two agreed to establish joint border patrols. They also chose to settle the issue peacefully by removing all displayed symbols of sovereignty from both countries.

In 2009, the area was given a special status as a neutral zone until a decision could be made by the International Court of Justice. Until then, it was placed under the administration of the Joint Committee for the Concerted Management of the Kourou/Koalou Area (COMGEC-K).

In 2018, Burkinabe forces deserted the area leading to a lack of security as Beninese forces had also left to avoid causing a diplomatic incident. The hole left by the security forces caused the area to become lawless and eventually an epicentre of an illicit cross-border fuel trade from the southern coast to the Sahel region to the north. Other goods such as cigarettes, motorbikes, food products, and sometimes arms are traded in the area, as such goods can be less expensive than in nearby areas. It has also allowed Al-Qaida-affiliated groups to operate gold mines in the area and to tax smugglers.

On 26 October 2021, suspected JNIM fighters robbed travellers from Benin of their belongings. This led to Beninese police to intervene and secure the area.

On 21 February 2023, Beninese troops launched an anti-terrorist operation into the area to crackdown on the smuggling and terrorist problem. However, it did not come without controversy from Burkina Faso.

On 25 May 2026, JNIM militants attacked nearby Beninese military posts, killing 12.

== Population ==
In 2015, the Citizenship Rights in Africa Initiative listed the population of the area as being about 5,000. According to the 2019 Burkina Faso census, Niorgou I had a population of 1,796, and Niorgou II had 388. Due to security challenges, the population of Koalou had to be estimated and was given as 5,905.

== See also ==
- Jihadist insurgency in Burkina Faso
