= Neutral zone (territorial entity) =

Type of political territory

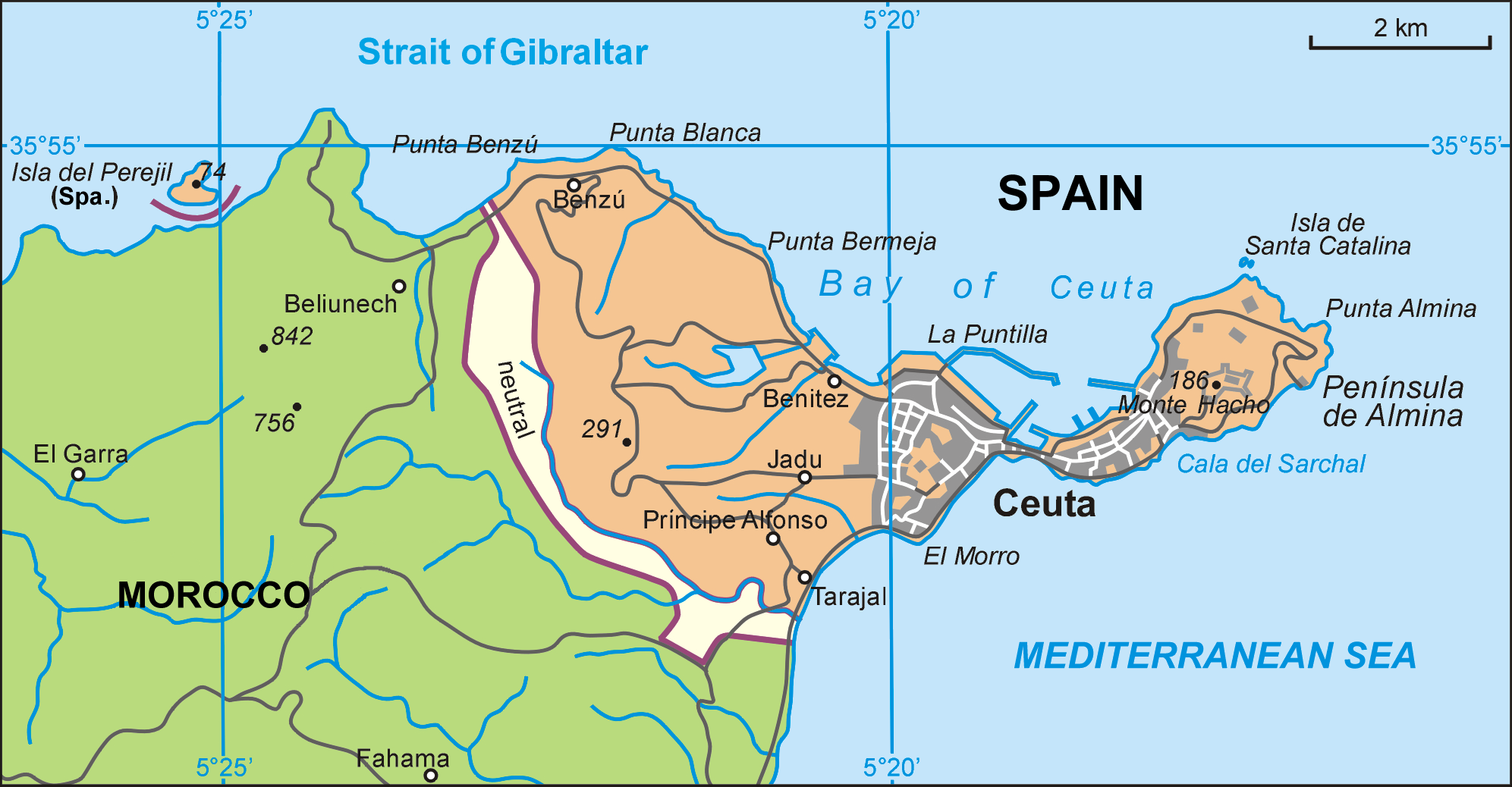
The neutral zone separating the Spanish city of Ceuta from Morocco

A neutral zone is a delimited zone bordering at least one of the states that has agreed to set up a neutral territory. This has occurred in the past and/or present for:

- Neutral Ground (Louisiana), a disputed area between Spanish Texas and the United States' newly acquired Louisiana Purchase, from 1806 to 1821
- Neutral Moresnet, a 19th-century neutral zone between the United Kingdom of the Netherlands (and later Belgium) and Prussia (and later the German Empire)
- Free City of Cracow, a 19th-century city republic and neutral zone between the partitioning powers of Poland: Austria, Prussia and Russia.
- in the colonial era, the neutral zone between Thailand and French Indochina, 25 kilometres wide (roughly 15.5 miles) on the east bank of the Mekong, was placed under French control but formally remained under Thai sovereignty.
- the Saudi–Iraqi neutral zone
- the Saudi–Kuwaiti neutral zone
- the neutral zones between Morocco and Ceuta and Melilla
- Antarctica
- United Nations Conciliation Commission's Government House in Jerusalem, which existed as a mediation center after the 1948 Arab–Israeli War
- Mount Vernon historic site, home of George Washington, during the US Civil War
- a strip of land in between Macau's Portas do Cerco and China's Kung-pei (Gongbei)
- Koalou/Kourou, a 68 km^{2} area of land between Benin and Burkina Faso containing the villages of Koalou, Niorgou I, and Niorgou II. Since 2009 the area has been administered by the Joint Committee for the Concerted Management of the Kourou/Koalou Area (COMGEC-K).
- a road through Tort-Kocho, between Kyrgyzstan and Tajikistan.

In many cases, a neutral zone is also a demilitarized zone.

== See also ==
- Neutralized Zone of Savoy
