= Nadiagou =

Village in Kompienga Province, Burkina Faso

- Location in Burkina Faso
- Coordinates: 11°09′30″N 00°50′16″E
- Country: Burkina Faso
- Region: Est Region
- Province: Kompienga Province
- Department: Pama Department
- Time zone: +2

Nadiagou is a village in the department and urban commune of Pama, located in the province of Kompienga in Burkina Faso. It is the main crossing point at the border with Togo and Benin.

== History ==
In 2021, the area saw an increased presence of armed terrorist groups. The village was occupied by Jama'at Nasr al‑Islam wal Muslimin militants from November 2021 until its liberation by the Burkinabe military on 14 January 2022.

== Demographics ==
In 2006, the village had 7,063 registered inhabitants.

In 2021, the village saw a mass exodus of its residents following a jihadist takeover.

== Health and education ==
The Nadiagou-Tindangou conurbation hosts a health and social promotion center (CSPS).

The village has a public elementary school in the Boulia sector.
