= Pâ Solar Power Station =

Solar farm in Burkina Faso

- Country: Burkina Faso
- Location: Pâ, Balé Province
- Coordinates: 11°33′52″N 03°15′38″W
- Status: Operational
- Construction began: 1 February 2020
- Commission date: December 2023
- Construction cost: €35.4 million
- Owner: Pâ Solar Consortium
- Operator: Pâ Solar Consortium

Solar farm
- Type: Flat-panel PV
- Site area: 35 hectares (86 acres)

Power generation
- Units planned: 25,000
- Nameplate capacity: 30 megawatts (40,000 hp)

Pâ Solar Power Station, is a 30 megawatts (40,000 hp) solar power plant in Burkina Faso. The power station was commercially commissioned in December 2023.

== Location ==
The power station is located in the Pâ Department of Balé Province, near the town of Pâ, in southwestern Burkina Faso. Pâ is approximately 44 kilometres (27 mi), by road, southwest of the town of Boromo, the provincial headquarters. This is about 222 kilometres (138 mi) by road southwest of Ouagadougou, the capital and largest city of Burkina Faso.

== Overview ==
The power station has a capacity of 30 megawatts, which is sold directly to Société Nationale d'électricité du Burkina Faso (SONABEL), the electric utility company of Burkina Faso, for integration in the national electricity grid. The developers of the power station have signed a 25-year power purchase agreement with SONABEL. After twenty-five years, ownership of the power station will revert to the Government of Burkina Faso.

The power station sits on 35 hectares (86 acres) of land, and comprises 25,000 solar panels. The energy generated is sufficient to supply 150,000 customers.

== Developers ==
The power station was developed by Pâ Solar Consortium, a consortium comprising Urbasolar, a French independent power producer, and Projet Production Solaire (PPS), a Burkinabe company, with minority shareholding in the special vehicle company that will own and develop the power station. Urbasolar is a subsidiary of Axpo Holding, a publicly traded Swiss energy conglomerate.

== Costs and funding ==
The cost of construction was budgeted at €35.4 million. The Emerging Africa Infrastructure Fund (EAIF), a member of the Private Infrastructure Development Group (PIDG), agreed to lend €29 million towards this project. Urbasolar was expected to provide the remaining €6.4 million in funding. The table below illustrates the sources of funding for this power station.

Pâ Solar Power Station funding
Rank	Funder	Classification	Amount € (millions)	Percentage
1	Emerging Africa Infrastructure Fund (EAIF)	Loan	29.0	81.92
2	Urbasolar	Investment	6.4	18.08
	Total		35.4	100.00

== See also ==
- List of power stations in Burkina Faso
- Zagtouli Solar Power Station
