= Madjoari Department =

Division of Kompienga Province, Burkina Faso

Coordinates: 11°28′35″N 1°15′03″E

Madjoari is a department of Kompienga Province, in the Est Region of Burkina Faso.

According to the 2006 census, there are 9,550 people living in the department.

== Villes ==
The department is made up of an administrative centre and seven villages.

- Madjoari is the administrative centre.

=== Villages ===
- Gnobtenkoagou
- Kodjaari
- Matambima
- Momba
- Namounyouri
- Tambarga
- Tanli
