= Zagtouli Solar Power Station =

Power station in Burkina Faso

- Country: Burkina Faso
- Location: Zagtouli, Ouagadougou
- Coordinates: 12°24′47″N 01°32′54″W
- Status: Operational
- Construction began: November 2016
- Commission date: November 2017
- Owner: Cegelec
- Operator: Cegelec

Solar farm
- Type: Flat-panel PV
- Site area: 55 hectares (140 acres)

Power generation
- Nameplate capacity: 33 MW (44,000 hp)
- Annual net output: 56 GWh

Zagtouli Solar Power Station is an operational 33 MW (44,000 hp) solar power plant in Burkina Faso. At the time of its commissioning, in November 2017, it was one of the largest grid-connected solar power stations in West Africa.

== Location ==
The development sits on 55 hectares (140 acres) of real estate, in Zagtouli, a northwestern suburb of Ouagadougou, the capital city of Burkina Faso.

== Overview ==
The power station was developed, and is operated by Cegelec, an electricity engineering firm headquartered in Paris, France. Zagtouli Solar Power Station comprises 129,600 solar panels, each rated at 260 watts. The plant is capable of generating 56 gigawatts-hours of electric energy annually. The power generated at this plant is sold to SONABEL, the national electricity company of Burkina Faso, for integration in the national power grid. The energy produced here costs 45 CFA francs (€0.07) per kilowatt-hour.

== Ownership ==
Zagtouli Solar Power Station is owned and operated by Cegelec, based in France, with major activity in France, Brazil, Indonesia, the Middle East and Africa.

== Funding ==
The cost of construction is reported to be €47.5 million (US$56.7 million), through a grant and a loan. The table below illustrates the funding sources for Zagtouli Solar Power Station.

Zatouli Solar Power Station funding
Rank	Funder	Classification	Amount € (millions)	Percentage
1	European Union	Grant	25.0	52.63
2	French Development Agency	Loan	22.5	47.37
	Total		47.5	100.00

== Other considerations ==
Burkina Faso is only able to produce 60 percent of the electricity it consumes. The remaining 40 percent is imported from neighboring Ghana and Ivory Coast. The output of this power plant is intended to reduce that energy deficit. In November 2017, there were plans to enlarge the power plant by another 17 megawatts to a total of 50 megawatts.

== See also ==
- List of power stations in Burkina Faso
