= Kompienga (department) =

- Department
- Interactive map of Kompienga
- Country: Burkina Faso
- Region: Est Region
- Province: Kompienga Province

Area
  - Total: 274.0 sq mi (709.7 km^{2})

Population (2019)
  - Total: 45,986
  - Density: 167.8/sq mi (64.80/km^{2})
- Time zone: UTC+0 (GMT 0)

Kompienga is a department or commune of Kompienga Province in Burkina Faso.

== Cities ==
The department consists of 17 villages:

- Bossoari
- Bounou
- Diabiga
- Diamanga
- Fanwargou
- Kpankpaga
- Kompienga, chef-lieu
- Kpinkankanti
- Nabamboula
- Nakiantanga
- Ogagou
- Pimpébougou
- Pognoa-Sankoado
- Pognoa-Tikonti
- Tambibangou
- Toukoudouga
- Toutourgou.
