= Lake Kompienga =

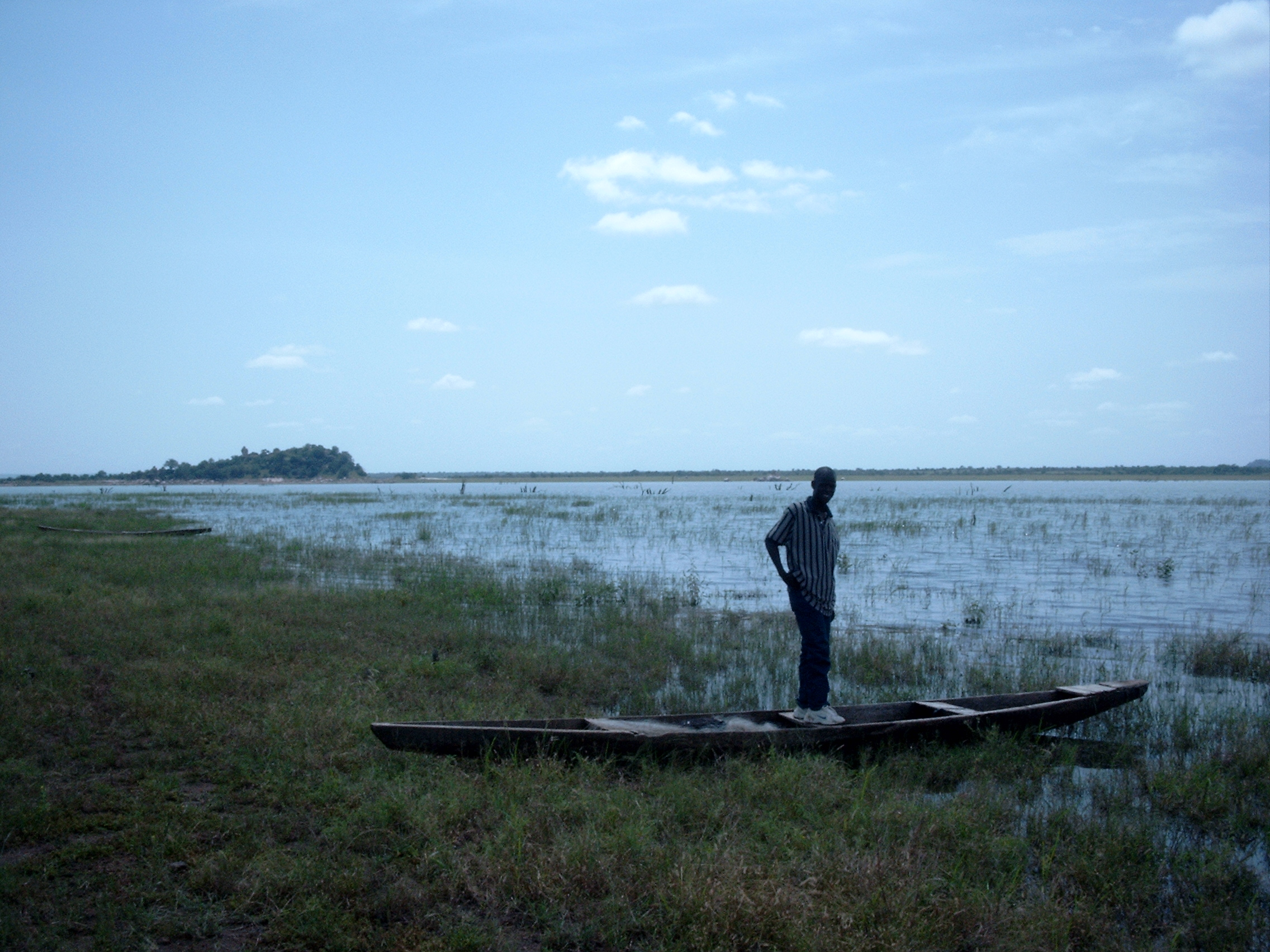

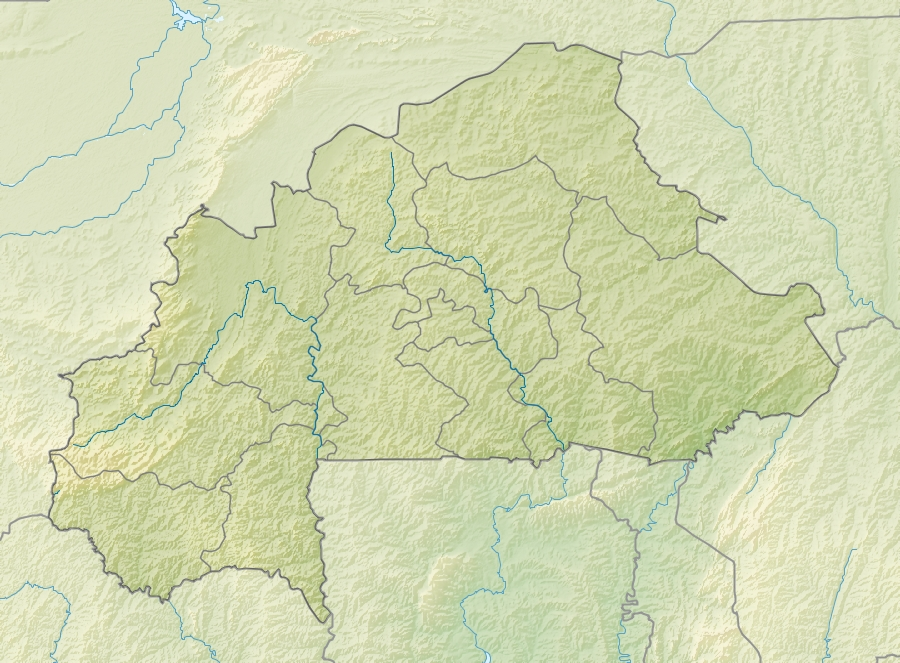
- Location within Burkina Faso
- Location: Kompienga Province
- Coordinates: 11°08′20″N 0°38′04″E
- Type: reservoir
- Basin countries: Burkina Faso

Ramsar Wetland
- Official name: Barrage de la Kompienga
- Designated: 7 October 2009
- Reference no.: 1875

Lake Kompienga is a reservoir lake in Kompienga Province in southeastern Burkina Faso. The Kompienga Dam was built in the 1980s to create the lake for economic purposes.

In 1985, demographers predicted that the construction of the Kompienga dam and lake would bring about 15% increase in immigration to area between 1985 and 1990, 15% between 1990 and 1995, and 8% between 1995 and 2000 for economic reasons.

However the creation of the lake and dam had consequences on some villages along the basin which were either totally or partially flooded by the dam-created lake.
