= Tort-Kocho =

Neutral zone between Kyrgyzstan and Tajikistan

Coordinates: 39°57′23″N 70°30′52″E

Tort-Kocho (Kyrgyz: Төрт-Көчө; Tajik: Қитъаи Чоркӯча) is a neutral zone between Kyrgyzstan and Tajikistan. As part of the 2025 delimitation of the Kyrgyzstan–Tajikistan border, the 10 m (33 ft) wide roadbed and a 15 m (49 ft) "security zone" were declared neutral territory, with Kyrgyzstani politician Kamchybek Tashiev saying the road will not belong to "either the Kyrgyz or Tajik side".

Tort-Kocho is an area where the major roads intersect. In that place the main road from Isfara to the Vorukh enclave in Tajikistan and the main road from Batken to Razzakov in Kyrgyzstan intersect. Prior to 2025, both the Kyrgyz and Tajikistani considered the road part of their sovereign territory. The road was contested during the 2021 Kyrgyzstan–Tajikistan clashes when Tajik administrators blocked the Osh–Batken–Isfana road demanding the Tort-Kocho road be unblocked by Kyrgyzstan.
