= Kompienga Dam =

Dam in Kompienga, Burkina Faso

Coordinates: 11.0821°N 0.6998°E

- Interactive map of Kompienga Dam
- Country: Burkina Faso
- Location: Kompienga Province
- Purpose: Mutli-purpose
- Status: Operational
- Construction began: 1985
- Opening date: 1988

Dam and spillways
- Type of dam: Earth fill dam
- Impounds: Ouale River
- Height (foundation): 50 metres (160 ft)
- Spillways: 2
- S pillway volumetric flow rate: 110 cubic metres per second (3,900 cu ft/s)

Reservoir
- Creates: Lake Kompienga
- Total capacity: 3 million cubic metres (110×10^{6} cu ft)

Kompienga Hydroelectric Power Station
- Type: Run-of-the-river
- Turbines: 2 Francis turbines
- Installed capacity: 14 MW

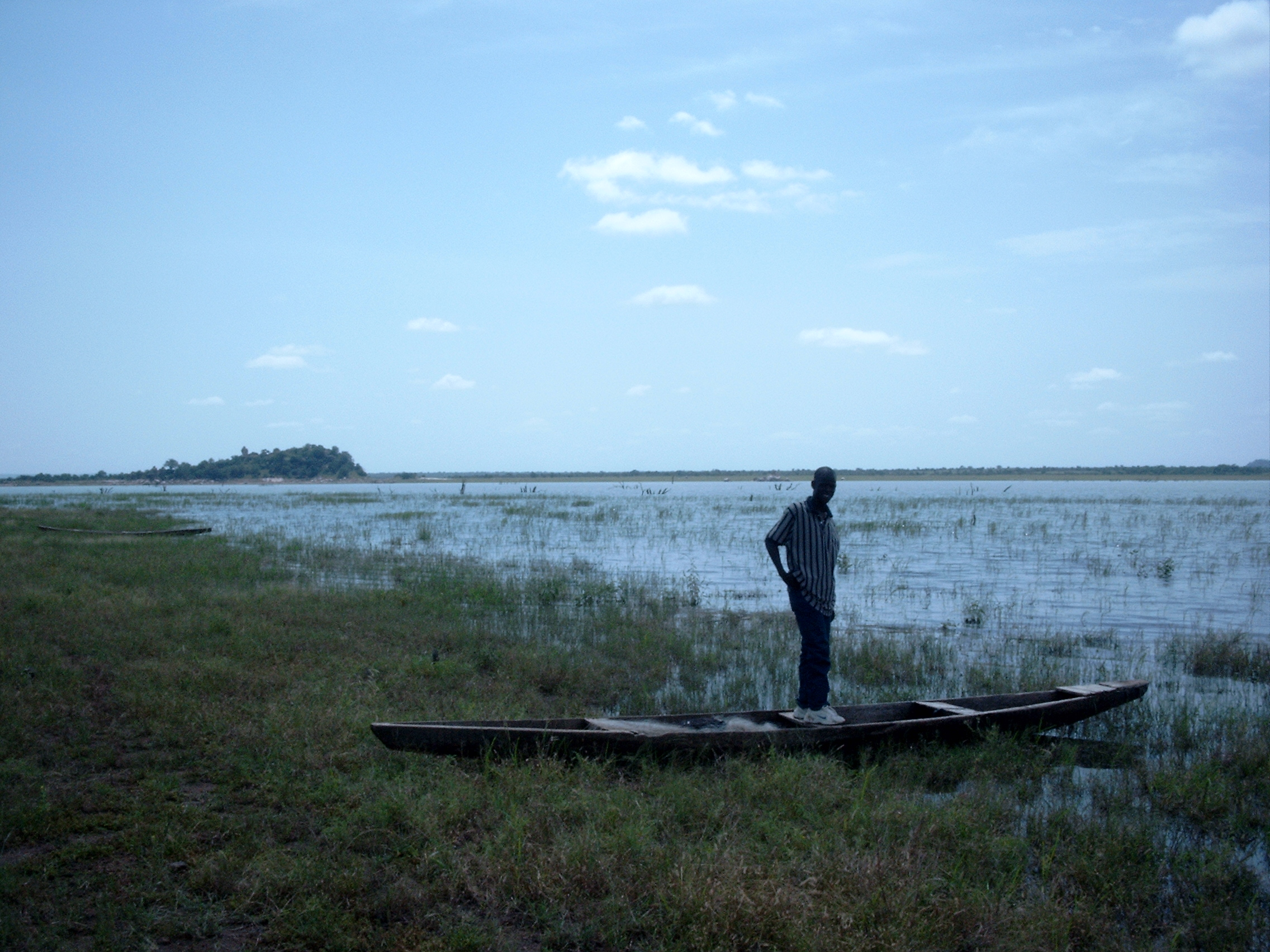
Lake Kompienga

The Kompienga Dam is a large hydro-electric dam in Kompienga Province in southeastern Burkina Faso. Constructed between 1985 and 1988, it is the country's first hydro-electric dam and is responsible for much of Ouagadougou's electricity supply. Visitors can obtain a permit to visit the control room of the dam from the state electricity parastatal.
