= Dassari, Burkina Faso =

Coordinates: 13°08′N 0°03′W

Dassari
- Interactive map of Dassari
- Country: Burkina Faso
- Region: Est Region
- Province: Gnagna Province
- Department: Manni Department

Population (2019)
  - Total: 2,113

Dassari is a village in the Manni Department of Gnagna Province in eastern Burkina Faso.

Population
Year	Pop.	±%
2006	1,049	—
2019	2,113	+101.4%
