= Pama (department) =

- Department
- Interactive map of Pama
- Country: Burkina Faso
- Region: Est Region
- Province: Kompienga Province

Area
  - Department: 1,924 sq mi (4,983 km^{2})

Population (2019 census)
  - Department: 61,722
  - Density: 32.08/sq mi (12.39/km^{2})
  - Urban: 13,579
- Time zone: UTC+0 (GMT 0)

Pama is a department or commune of Kompienga Province in Burkina Faso. Its capital is the town of Pama.

== Cities ==
The department is made up of a city chief town of the department (and the province):

- Pama (divided into 4 sectors)

and 14 villages:

- Bombontangou
- Folpodi
- Kabonga-I
- Kabonga-II
- Kalmama (or Signoghin )
- Koalou
- Kompiembiga
- Kpadiari
- Nadiagou
- Niorgou-I
- Niorgou-II
- Oumpougdéni
- Tibadi
- Tin.
