= Madjoari =

Rural commune in Kompienga, Est Region, Burkina Faso

Coordinates: 11°28′41″N 1°14′50″E

Madjoari is a rural commune located in the province of Kompienga in Burkina Faso.

In 2022, Madjoari was placed under blockade by jihadists. It was the site of the May 2022 Madjoari massacre, which left at least 50 civilians dead.
