= Nagréongo (department) =

- Department
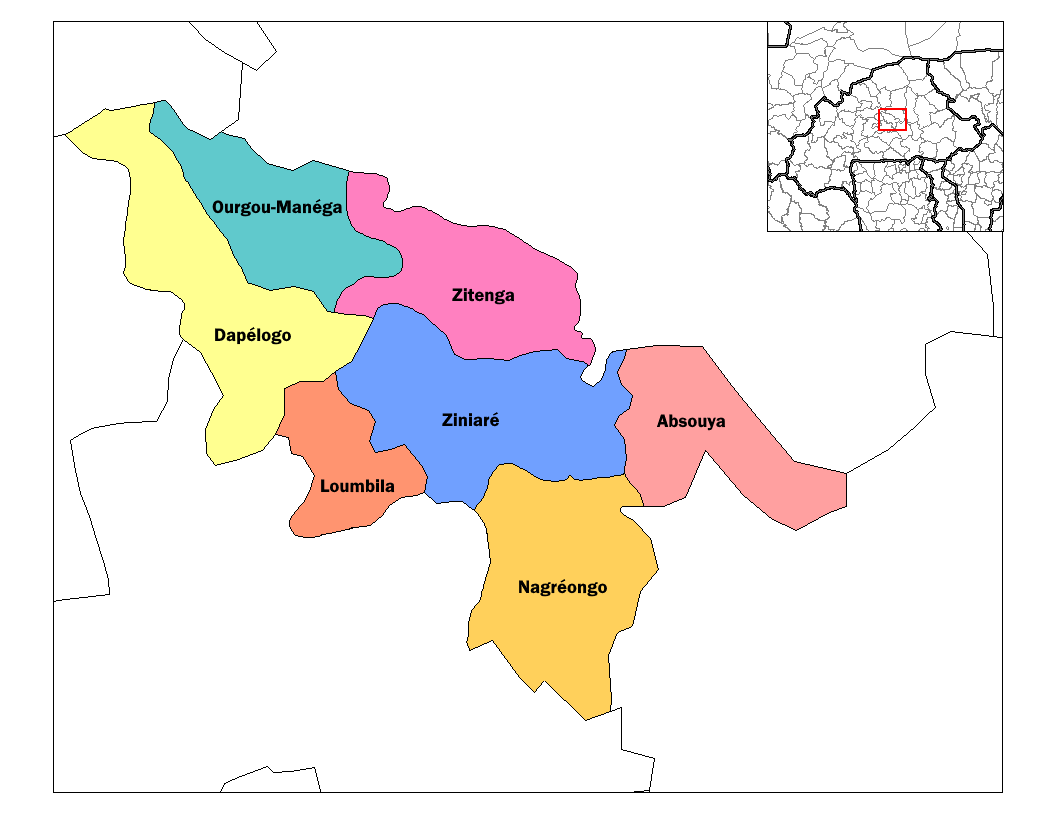
- Nagréongo Department location in the province
- Country: Burkina Faso
- Region: Plateau-Central Region
- Province: Oubritenga Province

Area
  - Total: 192.0 sq mi (497.2 km^{2})

Population (2019)
  - Total: 35,451
  - Density: 184.7/sq mi (71.30/km^{2})
- Time zone: UTC+0 (GMT 0)

Nagréongo is a department or commune of Oubritenga Province in Burkina Faso.
