= Matéri =

- Commune, arrondissement and town
- Location in Benin
- Coordinates: 10°41′52″N 1°3′48″E
- Country: Benin
- Department: Atakora Department

Area
  - Total: 670 sq mi (1,740 km^{2})

Population (2013)
  - Total: 113,958
- Time zone: UTC+1 (WAT)

Matéri [ma.te.ʁi] is a town, arrondissement and commune in the Atakora Department of north-western Benin. The commune covers an area of 4740 square kilometres and as of 2013 had a population of 113,958 people.
