= Kompienga Province =

Kompienga
- Province
- Location in Burkina Faso

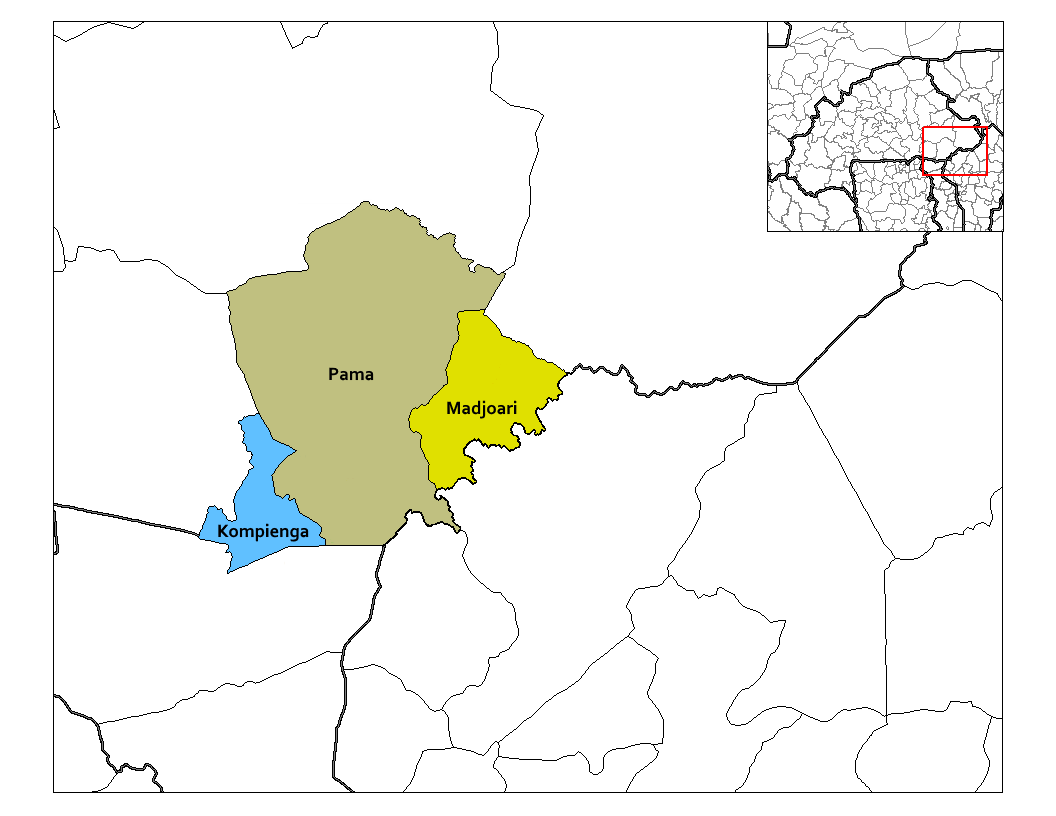
- Provincial map of its departments
- Country: Burkina Faso
- Region: Est Region
- Capital: Pama

Area
  - Province: 6,998 km^{2} (2,702 sq mi)

Population (2019 census)
  - Province: 117,672
  - Density: 16.82/km^{2} (43.55/sq mi)
  - Urban: 13,579
- Time zone: UTC+0 (GMT 0)

Kompienga is one of the 45 provinces of Burkina Faso, located in its Est Region.

The capital of Kompienga is Pama. The province also borders the country of Togo. The Kompienga Dam located in the province is the country's first hydro-electric dam and is responsible for much of Ouagadougou's electricity supply.

== Departments ==
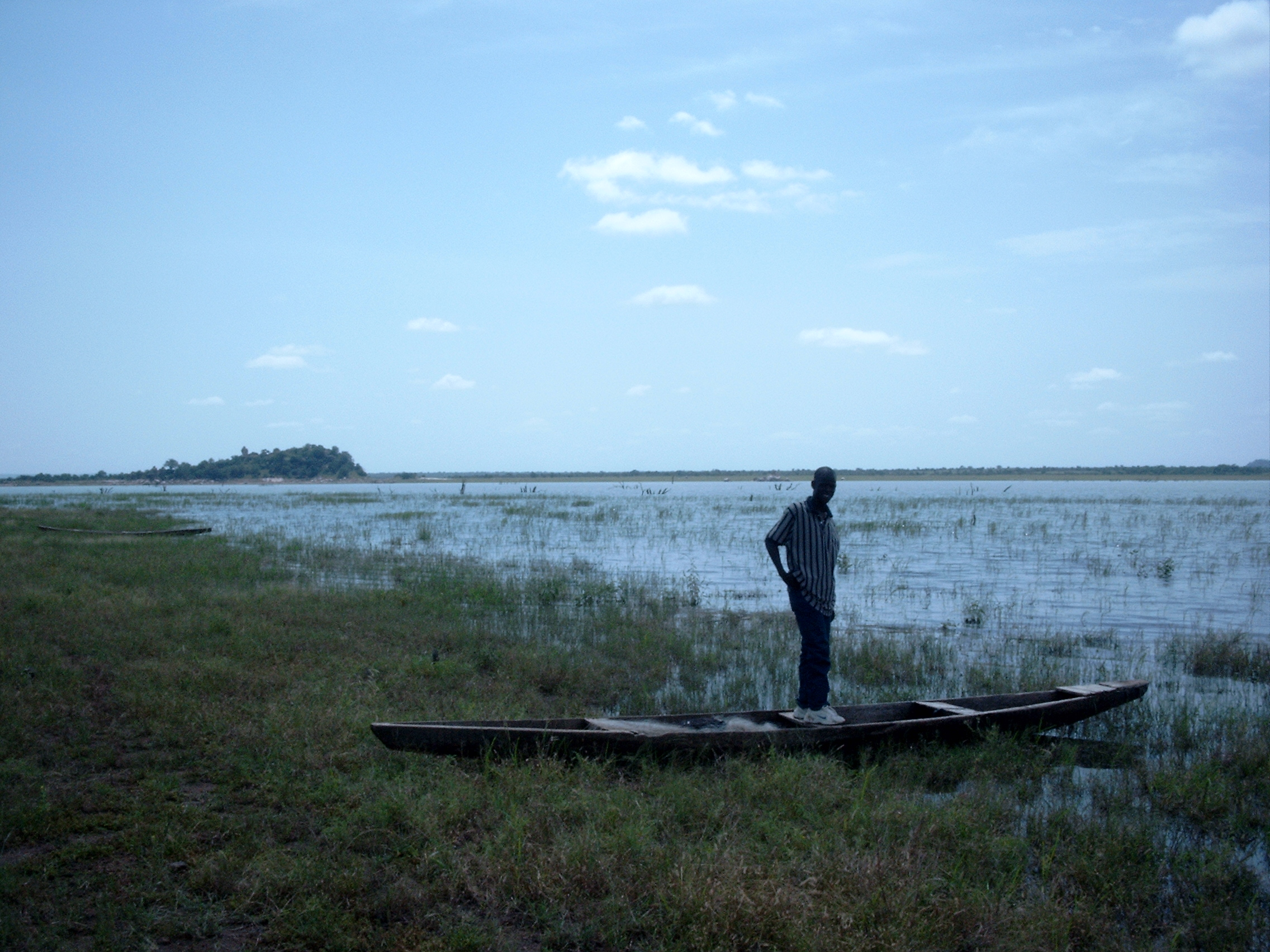
Lake Kompienga

The Departments of Kompienga
Department	Capital city	Population (Census 2019)
Kompienga Department	Kompienga	45,986
Madjoari Department	Madjoari	9,974
Pama Department	Pama	61,722

== See also ==
- West Africa
