= Société Nationale d'électricité du Burkina Faso =

- Trade name: SONABEL
- Company type: State owned
- Industry: Electricity
- Founded: 14 April 1995
- Headquarters: Ouagadougou, Burkina Faso
- Key people: Burkina Faso Mrs Madiara Sagnon (the chairman of the board of directors "COB")(2017)
- Products: Electric power
- Website: www.sonabel.bf

Société Nationale d'électricité du Burkina Faso (SONABEL) is the national electricity company of Burkina Faso. The company represents Burkina Faso in the West African Power Pool.

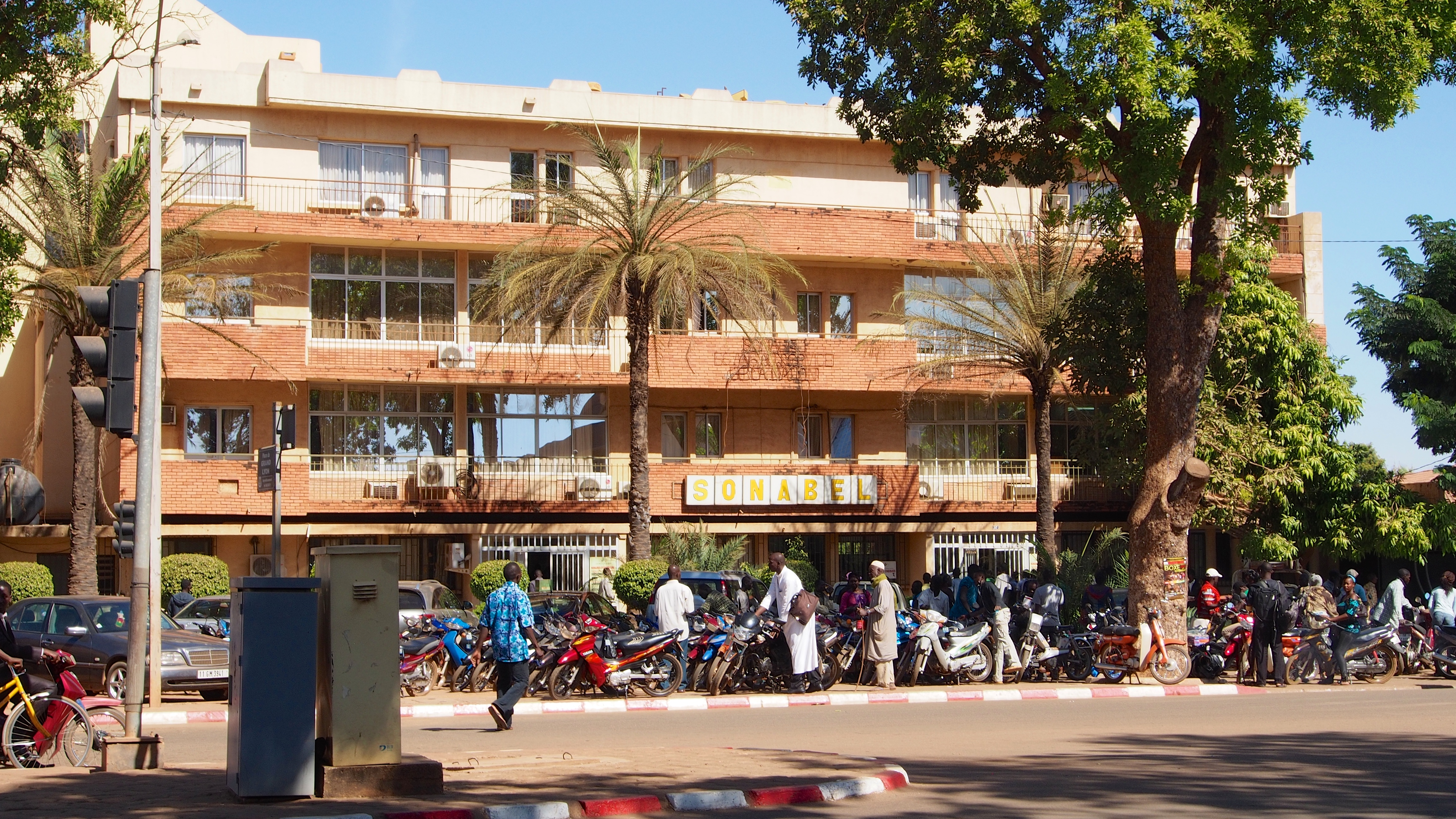
SONABEL headquarters in Ouagadougou

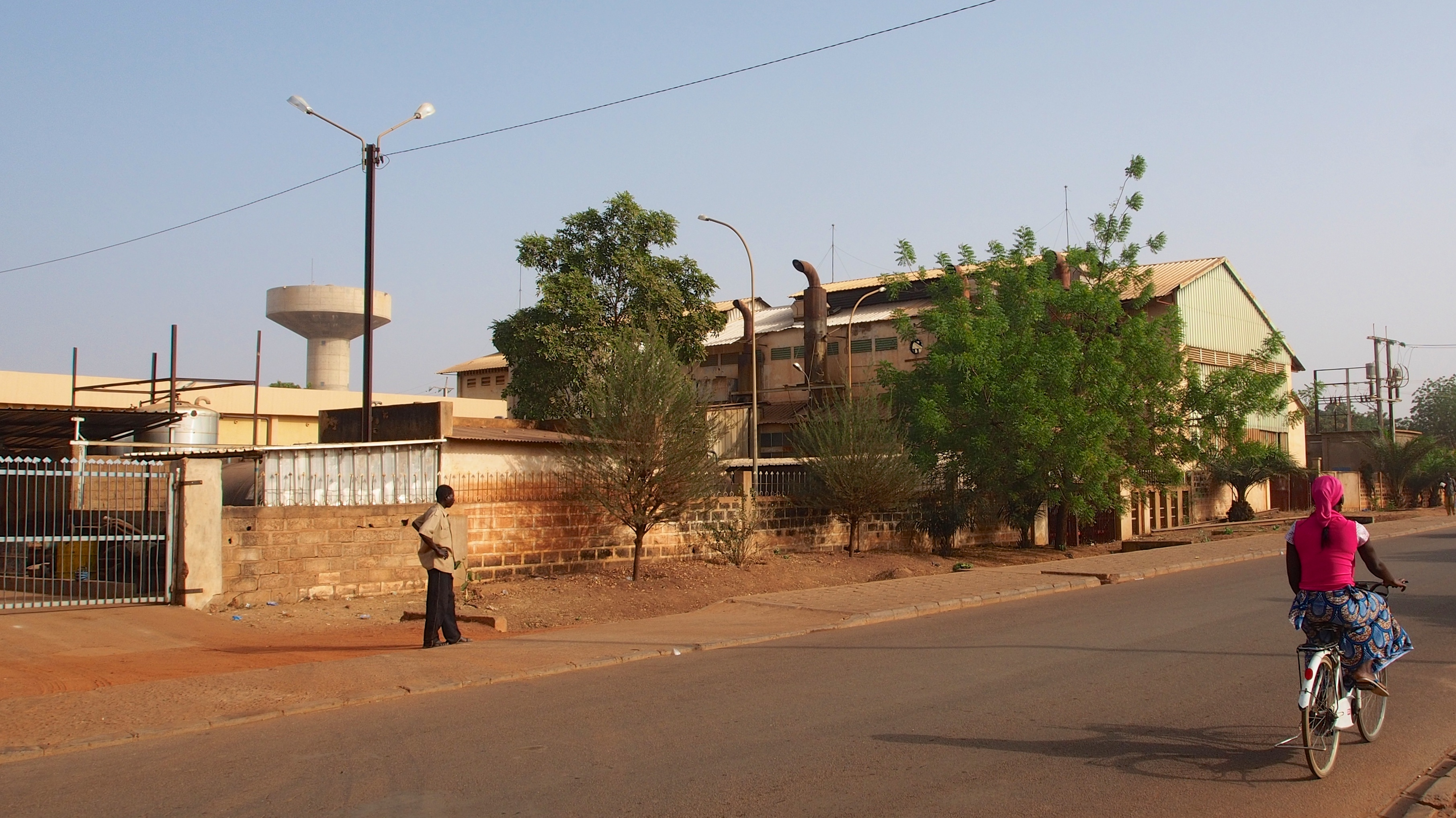
The fuel powered power plant Ouaga I, in the quarter of Paspanga, Ouagadougou

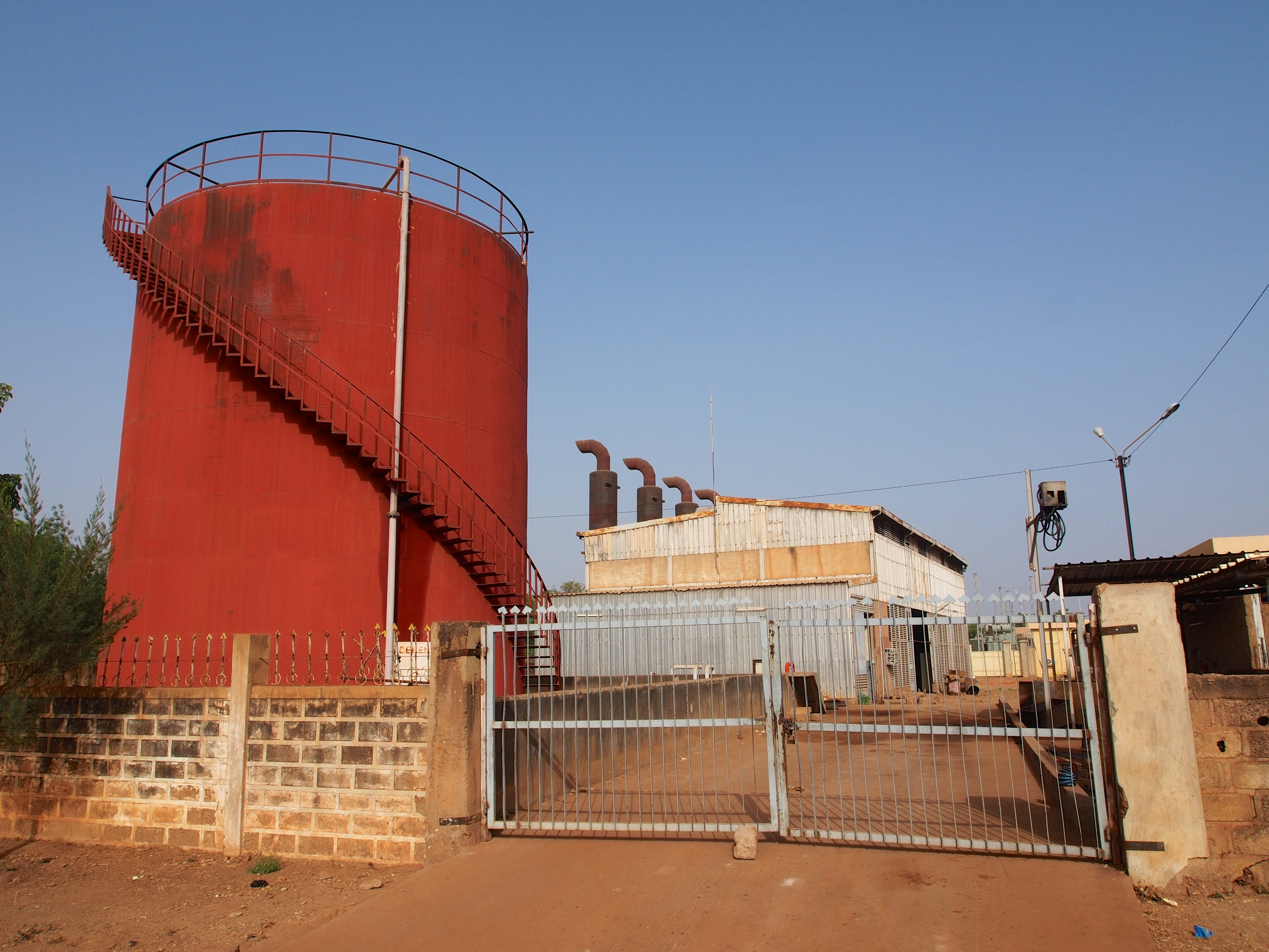
Ouaga II, build in the neighborhood of Ouaga I
