= Souloungou =

Coordinates: 13°01′N 0°23′E

- Interactive map of Souloungou
- Country: Burkina Faso
- Region: Est Region
- Province: Gnagna Province
- Department: Liptougou Department

Population (2019)
  - Total: 8,818

Souloungou is a town in the Liptougou Department of Gnagna Province in eastern Burkina Faso. The town has a population of 4,261.

The terrain around Soulougou is flat. The highest point in the area is 408 metres (1,300 ft) above sea level and is 15.5 km (9.5 mi) south of Soulougou. With a population density of about 27 people per square kilometre (0.81 sq mi), Soulougou is relatively sparsely populated. There are no other towns in the area.

== Geography ==
Souloungou – which is a locality with scattered residential centers and which administratively constitutes the most populated territory in the department – is located 20 km south-east of Liptougou and 13 km north-west of Bonsiéga.

Population
Year	Pop.	±%
1985	6,308	—
2006	5,039	−20.1%
2019	8,818	+75.0%

== Health and education ==
The closest health center to Souloungou is the Bonsiéga health and social promotion center (CSPS).
