= Nadouonou =

- Interactive map of Nadouonou
- Country: Burkina Faso
- Region: Est Region
- Province: Gnagna Province
- Department: Liptougou Department

Population (2019)
  - Total: 2,133

Nadouonou is a town in the Liptougou Department of Gnagna Province in eastern Burkina Faso.

== Geography ==
Nadouonou is located 6 km northwest of Bonsiéga and 30 km southeast of the capital Liptougou.

Population
Year	Pop.	±%
2006	1,128	—
2019	2,133	+89.1%

== Health and education ==
The closest health center to Nadouonou is the Bonsiéga health and social promotion center (CSPS).
