= Nalenga =

- Country: Burkina Faso
- Region: Est Region
- Province: Gnagna Province
- Department: Liptougou Department

Population (2019)
  - Total: 978

Nalenga is a village in the Liptougou Department of Gnagna Province in eastern Burkina Faso.

Population
Year	Pop.	±%
2006	388	—
2019	978	+152.1%

== Health and education ==
The closest health center to Nalenga is the Bonsiéga health and social promotion center (CSPS).
