= Balemba =

Coordinates: 13°04′N 0°00′E

- Interactive map of Balemba
- Country: Burkina Faso
- Region: Est Region
- Province: Gnagna Province
- Department: Manni Department

Population (2019)
  - Total: 1,352

Balemba is a town in the Manni Department of Gnagna Province in eastern Burkina Faso.

The land around Balèmba is largely flat. The highest point in the area is 280 metres (920 ft) above sea level and is 1.2 km (0.7 mi) southeast of Balèmba. The nearest larger town is Bogandé, 19.5 km (12 mi) southwest of Balèmba.

The area around Balèmba is almost entirely covered in grassland. There are about 19 people per square kilometre around Balèmba, with a small population. The climate is hot and dry. The average temperature is 28 °C. The hottest month is May, at 33 °C, and the coldest is January, at 24 °C. The average rainfall is 782 millimetres (31 in) per year. The wettest month is August, with 217 millimetres (8.5 in) of rain, and the driest is December, with 1 millimetre (0.4 in).

== Geography ==
Balemba is located 18 km northeast of Bogandé, the provincial capital, and 4 km from Mopienga. The commune is 18 km from the national road 18.

Population
| Year | Pop. | ±% |
|---|---|---|
| 1985 | 853 | — |
| 2006 | 1,901 | +122.9% |
| 2019 | 1,352 | −28.9% |

== Health and education ==
The closest health center to Balemba is the Mopienga health and social promotion center (CSPS).

== Other ==
Balemba may also refer to two placenames in Gabon, or to an ethnic group in Katanga.
