= Tambiga =

- Country: Burkina Faso
- Region: Est Region
- Province: Gnagna Province
- Department: Liptougou Department

Population (2019)
  - Total: 4,723

Tambiga is a town in the Liptougou Department of Gnagna Province in eastern Burkina Faso.

Population
Year	Pop.	±%
2006	2,976	—
2019	4,723	+58.7%

== Health and education ==
The closest health center to Tambiga is the Liptougou health and social promotion center (CSPS).
