= Kodjéna =

- Interactive map of Kodjéna
- Coordinates: 13°04′54″N 0°12′18″E
- Country: Burkina Faso
- Region: Est Region
- Province: Gnagna Province
- Department: Liptougou Department

Population (2019)
  - Total: 4,780

Kodjéna is a town in the Liptougou Department of Gnagna Province in eastern Burkina Faso.

== Geography ==
Kodjéna is located 16 km southwest of Liptougou on departmental road 18.

Population
Year	Pop.	±%
1985	2,102	—
2006	2,619	+24.6%
2019	4,780	+82.5%

== Health and education ==
Kodjéna hosts a health and social promotion center (CSPS).
