= Pintiagou =

- Country: Burkina Faso
- Region: Est Region
- Province: Gnagna Province
- Department: Liptougou Department

Population (2019)
  - Total: 3,538

Pintiagou is a town in the Liptougou Department of Gnagna Province in eastern Burkina Faso.

Population
Year	Pop.	±%
2006	1,838	—
2019	3,538	+92.5%

== Health and education ==
The closest health center to Pintiagou is the Liptougou health and social promotion center (CSPS).
