= Nagnoagou =

- Country: Burkina Faso
- Region: Est Region
- Province: Gnagna Province
- Department: Liptougou Department

Population (2019)
  - Total: 1,243

Nagnoagou is a town in the Liptougou Department of Gnagna Province in eastern Burkina Faso.

Population
| Year | Pop. | ±% |
|---|---|---|
| 2006 | 433 | — |
| 2019 | 1,243 | +187.1% |

== Health and education ==
The closest health center to Nagnoagou is the Liptougou health and social promotion center (CSPS).
