= Tantiaka =

- Country: Burkina Faso
- Region: Est Region
- Province: Gnagna Province
- Department: Liptougou Department

Population (2019)
  - Total: 1,920

Tantiaka is a village in the Liptougou Department of Gnagna Province in eastern Burkina Faso.

Population
Year	Pop.	±%
2006	799	—
2019	1,920	+140.3%

== Health and education ==
The closest health center to Tantiaka is the Liptougou health and social promotion center (CSPS).
