= Tolepsi =

- Location in Burkina Faso
- Coordinates: 13°8′N 0°13′E
- Country: Burkina Faso
- Region: Est Region
- Province: Gnagna Province
- Department: Liptougou Department

Population (2019)
  - Total: 2,425

Tolepsi is a town in the Liptougou Department of Gnagna Province in eastern Burkina Faso. The town has a population of 1,224.

The land around Tolépsi is largely flat, with a low-lying area to the north. The highest point in the area is 261 metres (853 ft) above sea level, 1.0 km (0.6 mi) north of Tolépsi. The population density of Tolépsi is around 27 people per square kilometre (0.82 mi). The nearest larger town is Dadounga, 13.9 km (8.6 mi) north of Tolépsi.

The area around Tolépsi is almost entirely covered with grassland. The climate is hot and dry. The average temperature is 28 °C. The hottest month is April, at 32 °C, and the coldest is August, at 23 °C. The average rainfall is 782 millimetres per year. The wettest month is August, at 217 millimetres of rain, and the driest is December, at 1 millimetre.

Population
Year	Pop.	±%
2006	1,223	—
2019	2,425	+98.3%
