= Bantouankpéba =

- Interactive map of Bantouankpéba
- Country: Burkina Faso
- Region: Est Region
- Province: Gnagna Province
- Department: Manni Department

Population (2019)
  - Total: 2,126

Bantouankpéba is a village in the Manni Department of Gnagna Province in eastern Burkina Faso.

== Geography ==
=== Situation ===
Bantouankpéba is located 4 km northeast of Manni near the Gouaya River on the road to Coalla.

=== Demography ===
Population
Year	Pop.	±%
1985	567	—
2006	1,020	+79.9%
2019	2,126	+108.4%

== Health and education ==
The closest health center to Bantouankpéba is the Manni medical center.
