= Ouaboidi =

- Country: Burkina Faso
- Region: Est Region
- Province: Gnagna Province
- Department: Liptougou Department

Population (2019)
  - Total: 2,710

Ouaboidi is a town in the Liptougou Department of Gnagna Province in eastern Burkina Faso.

Population
Year	Pop.	±%
2006	2,070	—
2019	2,710	+30.9%

== Health and education ==
The closest health center to Ouaboidi is the Bonsiéga health and social promotion center (CSPS).
