= Bartiboagou =

Bartiboagou Bartibogan
- Country: Burkina Faso
- Region: Est Region
- Province: Gnagna Province
- Department: Bilanga Department

Population (2019)
  - Total: 355

Bartiboagou is a village in the Bilanga Department of Gnagna Province in eastern Burkina Faso.

Population
Year	Pop.	±%
1985	318	—
2006	179	−43.7%
2019	355	+98.3%
