= Gomonsgou =

- Country: Burkina Faso
- Region: Est Region
- Province: Gnagna Province
- Department: Bilanga Department

Population (2019)
  - Total: 1,265

Gomonsgou or Gomponsgou is a village in the Bilanga Department of Gnagna Province in eastern Burkina Faso.

Population
Year	Pop.	±%
2006	816	—
2019	1,265	+55.0%
