= Gori, Piéla =

Gori Gari
- Interactive map of Gori
- Coordinates: 12°39′54″N 0°06′48″W
- Country: Burkina Faso
- Region: Est Region
- Province: Gnagna Province
- Department: Piéla Department

Population (2019)
  - Total: 3,745

Gori is a town in the Piéla Department of Gnagna Province in eastern Burkina Faso.

Population
Year	Pop.	±%
1985	980	—
2006	2,476	+152.7%
2019	3,745	+51.3%
