= Lanyabidi =

Lanyabidi Lanyabdi
- Interactive map of Lanyabidi
- Country: Burkina Faso
- Region: Est Region
- Province: Gnagna Province
- Department: Manni Department

Population (2019)
  - Total: 977

Lanyabidi is a village in the Manni Department of Gnagna Province in eastern Burkina Faso.

Population
Year	Pop.	±%
1985	294	—
2006	484	+64.6%
2019	977	+101.9%
