= Léoura-Corga =

Léoura-Corga Leaura Gorga
- Country: Burkina Faso
- Region: Est Region
- Province: Gnagna Province
- Department: Bogandé Department

Population (2019)
  - Total: 1,728

Léoura-Corga is a town in the Bogandé Department of Gnagna Province in eastern Burkina Faso.

Population
Year	Pop.	±%
1985	1,206	—
2006	1,487	+23.3%
2019	1,728	+16.2%
