= Bilamperga-Peulh =

- Country: Burkina Faso
- Region: Est Region
- Province: Gnagna Province
- Department: Bilanga Department

Population (2019)
  - Total: 248

Bilamperga-Peulh is a village in the Bilanga Department of Gnagna Province in eastern Burkina Faso.

Population
Year	Pop.	±%
1985	747	—
2006	46	−93.8%
2019	248	+439.1%
