= Kierguin =

- Country: Burkina Faso
- Region: Est Region
- Province: Gnagna Province
- Department: Bogandé Department

Population (2019)
  - Total: 10,169

Kierguin is a town in the Bogandé Department of Gnagna Province in eastern Burkina Faso.

Population
Year	Pop.	±%
1985	3,106	—
2006	4,604	+48.2%
2019	10,169	+120.9%
