= Sorgou =

- Interactive map of Sorgou
- Country: Burkina Faso
- Region: Est Region
- Province: Gnagna Province
- Department: Piéla Department

Population (2019)
  - Total: 1,390

Sorgou is a village in the Piéla Department of Gnagna Province in eastern Burkina Faso.

Population
Year	Pop.	±%
1985	608	—
2006	1,274	+109.5%
2019	1,390	+9.1%
