= Djoari =

- Country: Burkina Faso
- Region: Est Region
- Province: Gnagna Province
- Department: Liptougou Department

Population (2019 est.)
  - Total: 1,216

Djoari is a village in the Liptougou Department of Gnagna Province in eastern Burkina Faso.

Population
| Year | Pop. | ±% |
|---|---|---|
| 2006 | 631 | — |
| 2019 | 1,216 | +92.7% |

== Health and education ==
The closest health center to Djoari is the Liptougou health and social promotion center (CSPS).
