= Dabesma, Piéla =

Dabesma
- Location in Burkina Faso
- Coordinates: 12°42′N 0°10′W
- Country: Burkina Faso
- Region: Est Region
- Province: Gnagna Province
- Department: Piéla Department

Population (2019)
  - Total: 3,201

Dabesma is a town in the Piéla Department of Gnagna Province in eastern Burkina Faso.

Population
| Year | Pop. | ±% |
|---|---|---|
| 1985 | 1,118 | — |
| 2006 | 2,100 | +87.8% |
| 2019 | 3,201 | +52.4% |
