= Dabesma =

Coordinates: 12°42′N 0°10′W

- Interactive map of Dabesma
- Country: Burkina Faso
- Region: Est Region
- Province: Gnagna Province
- Department: Manni Department

Population (2019)
  - Total: 710

Dabesma is a town in the Manni Department of Gnagna Province in eastern Burkina Faso.

Population
Year	Pop.	±%
1985	419	—
2006	1,066	+154.4%
2019	710	−33.4%
