= Gongorgou =

Gongorgou Gangarougou
- Interactive map of Gongorgou
- Country: Burkina Faso
- Region: Est Region
- Province: Gnagna Province
- Department: Manni Department

Population (2019)
  - Total: 1,350

Gongorgou is a village in the Manni Department of Gnagna Province in eastern Burkina Faso.

Population
Year	Pop.	±%
1985	347	—
2006	570	+64.3%
2019	1,350	+136.8%
