= Korindiaka =

Korindiaka Karondiaka
- Interactive map of Korindiaka
- Coordinates: 12°40′50″N 0°07′16″W
- Country: Burkina Faso
- Region: Est Region
- Province: Gnagna Province
- Department: Piéla Department

Population (2019)
  - Total: 577

Korindiaka is a village in the Piéla Department of Gnagna Province in eastern Burkina Faso.

Population
Year	Pop.	±%
1985	207	—
2006	301	+45.4%
2019	577	+91.7%
