= Nakodou =

- Interactive map of Nakodou
- Country: Burkina Faso
- Region: Est Region
- Province: Gnagna Province
- Department: Piéla Department

Population (2019)
  - Total: 891

Nakodou is a village in the Piéla Department of Gnagna Province in eastern Burkina Faso.

Population
Year	Pop.	±%
1985	483	—
2006	425	−12.0%
2019	891	+109.6%
