= Babri, Burkina Faso =

Town in Burkina Faso

Babri
- Location in Burkina Faso
- Country: Burkina Faso
- Region: Est Region
- Province: Gnagna Province
- Department: Bogandé Department

Population (2019)
  - Total: 3,498

Babri is a town in the Bogandé Department of Gnagna Province in eastern Burkina Faso.

Population
Year	Pop.	±%
1985	2,648	—
2006	3,668	+38.5%
2019	3,498	−4.6%
