= Pougdiari =

Pougdiari Pougandiari
- Interactive map of Pougdiari
- Country: Burkina Faso
- Region: Est Region
- Province: Gnagna Province
- Department: Manni Department

Population (2019)
  - Total: 1,744

Pougdiari is a village in the Manni Department of Gnagna Province in eastern Burkina Faso.

Population
| Year | Pop. | ±% |
|---|---|---|
| 1985 | 262 | — |
| 2006 | 973 | +271.4% |
| 2019 | 1,744 | +79.2% |
