= Lontakoani =

- Interactive map of Lontakoani
- Country: Burkina Faso
- Region: Est Region
- Province: Gnagna Province
- Department: Liptougou Department

Population (2019)
  - Total: 1,073

Lontakoani is a village in the Liptougou Department of Gnagna Province in eastern Burkina Faso.

== Geography ==
Lontakoani – which is an agro-pastoral commune with scattered residential centers – is located 8 km west of Liptougou.

Population
Year	Pop.	±%
2006	686	—
2019	1,073	+56.4%

== Health and education ==
The closest health center to Lontakoani is the Liptougou health and social promotion center (CSPS).
