= Papayenga (Diambanga) =

- Country: Burkina Faso
- Region: Est Region
- Province: Gnagna Province
- Department: Bilanga Department

Population (2019)
  - Total: 1,127

Papayenga (Diambanga) is a village in the Bilanga Department of Gnagna Province in eastern Burkina Faso.

Population
Year	Pop.	±%
2006	824	—
2019	1,127	+36.8%
