= Kokou, Burkina Faso =

Kokou
- Location in Burkina Faso
- Coordinates: 13°5′N 0°19′E
- Country: Burkina Faso
- Region: Est Region
- Province: Gnagna Province
- Department: Liptougou Department

Population (2019)
  - Total: 2,808

Kokou is a town in the Liptougou Department of Gnagna Province in eastern Burkina Faso.

== Geography ==
Kokou – which is a commune with scattered residential centers – is located 11 km south of Liptougou.

Population
Year	Pop.	±%
2006	2,104	—
2019	2,808	+33.5%

== Health and education ==
The closest health center to Kokou is the Liptougou health and social promotion center (CSPS).
