= Dionfirga =

- Country: Burkina Faso
- Region: Est Region
- Province: Gnagna Province
- Department: Bogandé Department

Population (2019)
  - Total: 1,780

Dionfirga is a village in the Bogandé Department of Gnagna Province in eastern Burkina Faso.

Population
Year	Pop.	±%
1985	718	—
2006	988	+37.6%
2019	1,780	+80.2%
