= Samou-Gabondi =

- Country: Burkina Faso
- Region: Est Region
- Province: Gnagna Province
- Department: Bogandé Department

Population (2019)
  - Total: 1,201

Samou-Gabondi is a town in the Bogandé Department of Gnagna Province in eastern Burkina Faso.

Population
Year	Pop.	±%
1985	1,369	—
2006	1,573	+14.9%
2019	1,201	−23.6%
