= Yougpangou =

- Country: Burkina Faso
- Region: Est Region
- Province: Gnagna Province
- Department: Bilanga Department

Population (2019)
  - Total: 3,296

Yougpangou is a town in the Bilanga Department of Gnagna Province in eastern Burkina Faso.

Population
Year	Pop.	±%
1985	1,144	—
2006	2,610	+128.1%
2019	3,296	+26.3%
