= Bambilaré =

- Location in Burkina Faso
- Coordinates: 13.236583°N 0.172734°E
- Country: Burkina Faso
- Region: Est Region
- Province: Gnagna Province
- Department: Liptougou Department

Population (2019)
  - Total: 2,710

Bambilaré is a town in the Liptougou Department of Gnagna Province in eastern Burkina Faso.

== Geography ==
Bambilaré – an agro-pastoral commune with scattered residential centres – is located 15 km northwest of Liptougou.

Population
Year	Pop.	±%
1985	1,758	—
2006	1,422	−19.1%
2019	2,710	+90.6%

== Health and education ==
The closest health center to Bambilaré is the Liptougou health and social promotion center (CSPS).
