= Kongaye =

Coordinates: 12°47′N 0°08′W

- Interactive map of Kongaye
- Country: Burkina Faso
- Region: Est Region
- Province: Gnagna Province
- Department: Piéla Department

Population (2019)
  - Total: 4,201

Kongaye is a town in the Piéla Department of Gnagna Province in eastern Burkina Faso.

Population
Year	Pop.	±%
2006	2,937	—
2019	4,201	+43.0%
