= Bilamperga =

- Interactive map of Bilamperga
- Country: Burkina Faso
- Region: Est Region
- Province: Gnagna Province
- Department: Bilanga Department

Population (2019)
  - Total: 3,535

Bilamperga is a town in the Bilanga Department of Gnagna Province in eastern Burkina Faso.

Population
Year	Pop.	±%
1985	3,401	—
2006	2,107	−38.0%
2019	3,535	+67.8%
