= Bilanga-Yanga Peulh =

- Interactive map of Bilanga-Yanga Peulh
- Country: Burkina Faso
- Region: Est Region
- Province: Gnagna Province
- Department: Bilanga Department

Population (2019)
  - Total: 762

Bilanga-Yanga Peulh is a town in the Bilanga Department of Gnagna Province in eastern Burkina Faso.

Population
Year	Pop.	±%
1985	477	—
2006	250	−47.6%
2019	762	+204.8%
