= Boungou Folgou =

Boungou Folgou Boungou Falgna
- Interactive map of Boungou Folgou
- Coordinates: 13°12′N 0°18′W
- Country: Burkina Faso
- Region: Est Region
- Province: Gnagna Province
- Department: Manni Department

Population (2019)
  - Total: 2,450

Boungou Folgou is a town that is located in the Manni Department of the Gnagna Province in eastern Burkina Faso.

Population
Year	Pop.	±%
1985	638	—
2006	1,264	+98.1%
2019	2,450	+93.8%
