= Dakiri =

- Location in Burkina Faso
- Coordinates: 13°18′N 0°15′W
- Country: Burkina Faso
- Region: Est Region
- Province: Gnagna Province
- Department: Manni Department

Population (2019)
  - Total: 2,636

Dakiri is a town in the Manni Department of Gnagna Province in eastern Burkina Faso.

Population
Year	Pop.	±%
1985	1,157	—
2006	1,308	+13.1%
2019	2,636	+101.5%
