= Fouga, Burkina Faso =

Coordinates: 13°16′N 0°17′E

Fouga
- Interactive map of Fouga
- Country: Burkina Faso
- Region: Est Region
- Province: Gnagna Province
- Department: Liptougou Department

Population (2019)
  - Total: 1,390

Fouga is a village in the Liptougou Department of Gnagna Province in eastern Burkina Faso.

== Geography ==
Fouga is located 8 km north of Liptougou on departmental road 18.

Population
Year	Pop.	±%
2006	958	—
2019	1,390	+45.1%

== Health and education ==
The closest health center to Fouga is the Liptougou health and social promotion center (CSPS).
