= Kodjoani-kankalsi =

Kodjoani-kankalsi Kodjoani-kankala
- Country: Burkina Faso
- Region: Est Region
- Province: Gnagna Province
- Department: Bogandé Department

Population (2019)
  - Total: 1,889

Kodjoani-kankalsi is a town in the Bogandé Department of Gnagna Province in eastern Burkina Faso.

Population
Year	Pop.	±%
1985	850	—
2006	1,201	+41.3%
2019	1,889	+57.3%
