= Gaboassi =

- Country: Burkina Faso
- Region: Est Region
- Province: Gnagna Province
- Department: Piéla Department

Population (2019)
  - Total: 1,356

Gaboassi is a village in the Piéla Department of Gnagna Province in eastern Burkina Faso.

Population
Year	Pop.	±%
1985	473	—
2006	721	+52.4%
2019	1,356	+88.1%
