= Nagniangou =

- Interactive map of Nagniangou
- Country: Burkina Faso
- Region: Est Region
- Province: Gnagna Province
- Department: Bilanga Department

Population (2019)
  - Total: 1,465

Nagniangou is a village in the Bilanga Department of Gnagna Province in eastern Burkina Faso.

Population
Year	Pop.	±%
1985	484	—
2006	1,372	+183.5%
2019	1,465	+6.8%
