= Koulfo =

Koulfo Konlfo
- Interactive map of Koulfo
- Country: Burkina Faso
- Region: Est Region
- Province: Gnagna Province
- Department: Manni Department

Population (2019)
  - Total: 2,726

Koulfo is a town in the Manni Department of Gnagna Province in eastern Burkina Faso.

Population
| Year | Pop. | ±% |
|---|---|---|
| 1985 | 1,262 | — |
| 2006 | 1,618 | +28.2% |
| 2019 | 2,726 | +68.5% |
