= Noali =

Coordinates: 12°42′N 0°12′W

- Interactive map of Noali
- Country: Burkina Faso
- Region: Est Region
- Province: Gnagna Province
- Department: Piéla Department

Population (2019)
  - Total: 1,704

Noali is a town in the Piéla Department of Gnagna Province in eastern Burkina Faso.

Population
Year	Pop.	±%
1985	1,921	—
2006	1,049	−45.4%
2019	1,704	+62.4%
