= Dayédé =

Dayédé Dayedi
- Country: Burkina Faso
- Region: Est Region
- Province: Gnagna Province
- Department: Manni Department

Population (2019)
  - Total: 884

Dayédé is a village in the Manni Department of Gnagna Province in eastern Burkina Faso.

Population
Year	Pop.	±%
1985	110	—
2006	779	+608.2%
2019	884	+13.5%
