= Tobou-Peulh =

- Country: Burkina Faso
- Region: Est Region
- Province: Gnagna Province
- Department: Bilanga Department

Population (2019)
  - Total: 327

Tobou-Peulh is a village in the Bilanga Department of Gnagna Province in eastern Burkina Faso.

Population
Year	Pop.	±%
1985	1,217	—
2006	556	−54.3%
2019	327	−41.2%
