= Tougoudadou =

Tougoudadou Tougandado
- Country: Burkina Faso
- Region: Est Region
- Province: Gnagna Province
- Department: Piéla Department

Population (2019)
  - Total: 654

Tougoudadou is a village in the Piéla Department of Gnagna Province in eastern Burkina Faso.

Population
| Year | Pop. | ±% |
|---|---|---|
| 1985 | 246 | — |
| 2006 | 698 | +183.7% |
| 2019 | 654 | −6.3% |
