= Bilanga-Yanga =

- Location in Burkina Faso
- Coordinates: 12°27′49″N 0°05′45″W
- Country: Burkina Faso
- Region: Est Region
- Province: Gnagna Province
- Department: Bilanga Department

Population (2019)
  - Total: 2,865

Bilanga-Yanga is a town in the Bilanga Department of Gnagna Province in eastern Burkina Faso.

Population
Year	Pop.	±%
1985	2,895	—
2006	3,414	+17.9%
2019	2,865	−16.1%
