= Touolongou =

- Country: Burkina Faso
- Region: Est Region
- Province: Gnagna Province
- Department: Liptougou Department

Population (2019)
  - Total: 2,766

Touolongou is a village in the Liptougou Department of Gnagna Province in eastern Burkina Faso.

Population
Year	Pop.	±%
2006	779	—
2019	2,766	+255.1%
