= Diapoadougou =

- Location in Burkina Faso
- Coordinates: 12.79°N 0.385833°E
- Country: Burkina Faso
- Region: Est Region
- Province: Gnagna Province
- Department: Bilanga Department

Population (2019)
  - Total: 4,362

Diapoadougou is a town in the Bilanga Department of Gnagna Province in eastern Burkina Faso.

Population
Year	Pop.	±%
2006	2,296	—
2019	4,362	+90.0%
