= Tiongo-Lampiadi =

- Country: Burkina Faso
- Region: Est Region
- Province: Gnagna Province
- Department: Piéla Department

Population (2019)
  - Total: 1,021

Tiongo-Lampiadi is a village in the Piéla Department of Gnagna Province in eastern Burkina Faso.

Population
Year	Pop.	±%
1985	612	—
2006	484	−20.9%
2019	1,021	+111.0%
