= Nakouri =

- Interactive map of Nakouri
- Country: Burkina Faso
- Region: Est Region
- Province: Gnagna Province
- Department: Manni Department

Population (2019)
  - Total: 1,017

Nakouri is a village in the Manni Department of Gnagna Province in eastern Burkina Faso.

Population
Year	Pop.	±%
1985	362	—
2006	650	+79.6%
2019	1,017	+56.5%
