= Tobou =

- Interactive map of Tobou
- Country: Burkina Faso
- Region: Est Region
- Province: Gnagna Province
- Department: Bilanga Department

Population (2019)
  - Total: 2,260

Tobou is a town in the Bilanga Department of Gnagna Province in eastern Burkina Faso.

Population
Year	Pop.	±%
1985	4,210	—
2006	1,725	−59.0%
2019	2,260	+31.0%
