= Diamdiara =

- Location in Burkina Faso
- Coordinates: 12°29′N 0°14′W
- Country: Burkina Faso
- Region: Est Region
- Province: Gnagna Province
- Department: Bilanga Department

Population (2019)
  - Total: 2,216

Diamdiara is a town in the Bilanga Department of Gnagna Province in eastern Burkina Faso.

Population
Year	Pop.	±%
1985	836	—
2006	1,450	+73.4%
2019	2,216	+52.8%
