= Kossougoudou =

Kossougoudou Kassoudougou
- Location in Burkina Faso
- Coordinates: 12°58′N 0°14′W
- Country: Burkina Faso
- Region: Est Region
- Province: Gnagna Province
- Department: Bogandé Department

Population (2019)
  - Total: 2,774

Kossougoudou is a town in the Bogandé Department of Gnagna Province in eastern Burkina Faso.

Population
Year	Pop.	±%
1985	865	—
2006	1,709	+97.6%
2019	2,774	+62.3%
