= Bombonyenga =

Bombonyenga Bombonyonga
- Location in Burkina Faso
- Coordinates: 13°12′N 0°16′W
- Country: Burkina Faso
- Region: Est Region
- Province: Gnagna Province
- Department: Manni Department

Population (2019)
  - Total: 2,193

Bombonyenga is a town in the Manni Department of Gnagna Province in eastern Burkina Faso.

Population
Year	Pop.	±%
1985	875	—
2006	1,637	+87.1%
2019	2,193	+34.0%
