= Moadéga =

- Interactive map of Moadéga
- Country: Burkina Faso
- Region: Est Region
- Province: Gnagna Province
- Department: Bilanga Department

Population (2019)
  - Total: 1,651

Moadéga is a village in the Bilanga Department of Gnagna Province in eastern Burkina Faso.

Population
Year	Pop.	±%
1985	405	—
2006	748	+84.7%
2019	1,651	+120.7%
