= Kogodou =

Kogodou Kagodou
- Location in Burkina Faso
- Coordinates: 12°43′41″N 0°06′35″E
- Country: Burkina Faso
- Region: Est Region
- Province: Gnagna Province
- Department: Bilanga Department

Population (2019)
  - Total: 4,693

Kogodou is a town in the Bilanga Department of Gnagna Province in eastern Burkina Faso.

Population
Year	Pop.	±%
1985	1,206	—
2006	2,291	+90.0%
2019	4,693	+104.8%
