= Boungou Natimsa =

Boungou Natimsa Boungou Natinga
- Interactive map of Boungou Natimsa
- Country: Burkina Faso
- Region: Est Region
- Province: Gnagna Province
- Department: Manni Department

Population (2019)
  - Total: 1,662

Boungou Natimsa is a town in the Manni Department of Gnagna Province in eastern Burkina Faso.

Population
Year	Pop.	±%
1985	1,805	—
2006	2,920	+61.8%
2019	1,662	−43.1%
