= Paparcé =

Paparcé Parce
- Country: Burkina Faso
- Region: Est Region
- Province: Gnagna Province
- Department: Bilanga Department

Population (2019)
  - Total: 1,385

Paparcé is a village in the Bilanga Department of Gnagna Province in eastern Burkina Faso.

Population
Year	Pop.	±%
1985	604	—
2006	872	+44.4%
2019	1,385	+58.8%
