= Tambidi =

Tambidi Tambiri
- Location in Burkina Faso
- Coordinates: 13°18′N 0°17′W
- Country: Burkina Faso
- Region: Est Region
- Province: Gnagna Province
- Department: Manni Department

Population (2019)
  - Total: 978

Tambidi is a village in the Manni Department of Gnagna Province in eastern Burkina Faso.

Population
Year	Pop.	±%
1985	472	—
2006	862	+82.6%
2019	978	+13.5%
