= Ganta, Burkina Faso =

Ganta
- Location in Burkina Faso
- Coordinates: 13°32′N 0°03′W
- Country: Burkina Faso
- Region: Est Region
- Province: Gnagna Province
- Department: Coalla Department

Population (2019)
  - Total: 3,886

Ganta is a town in the Coalla Department of Gnagna Province in eastern Burkina Faso.

== Geography ==
Ganta is a scattered agropastoral locality located 18 km (11 mi) northeast of Coalla and 16 km (9.9 mi) east of Bonsiéga.

Population
Year	Pop.	±%
1985	1,427	—
2006	2,673	+87.3%
2019	3,886	+45.4%

== Health and education ==
The nearest health center to Ganta is the Bonsiega Health and Social Promotion Center (HSPC).
