= Dapili =

- Country: Burkina Faso
- Region: Est Region
- Province: Gnagna Province
- Department: Bogandé Department

Population (2019)
  - Total: 2,569

Dapili is a town in the Bogandé Department of Gnagna Province in eastern Burkina Faso.

Population
Year	Pop.	±%
1985	1,091	—
2006	1,656	+51.8%
2019	2,569	+55.1%
