= Samou =

Bapunagar
- Country: Burkina Faso
- Region: Est Region
- Province: Gnagna Province
- Department: Bogandé Department

Population (2019)
  - Total: 2,883

Samou is a town in the Bogandé Department of Gnagna Province in eastern Burkina Faso.

Population
Year	Pop.	±%
1985	4,739	—
2006	3,662	−22.7%
2019	2,883	−21.3%
