= Obdaga =

- Interactive map of Obdaga
- Country: Burkina Faso
- Region: Est Region
- Province: Gnagna Province
- Department: Manni Department

Population (2019)
  - Total: 1,212

Obdaga is a town in the Manni Department of Gnagna Province in eastern Burkina Faso.

Population
Year	Pop.	±%
1985	505	—
2006	1,437	+184.6%
2019	1,212	−15.7%
