= Yarba =

- Location in Burkina Faso
- Coordinates: 13°14′N 0°20′W
- Country: Burkina Faso
- Region: Est Region
- Province: Gnagna Province
- Department: Manni Department

Population (2019)
  - Total: 481

Yarba is a town in the Manni Department of Gnagna Province in eastern Burkina Faso.

Population
Year	Pop.	±%
2006	1,259	—
2019	481	−61.8%
