= Tohogodou =

Tohogodou Tohogodan
- Country: Burkina Faso
- Region: Est Region
- Province: Gnagna Province
- Department: Bilanga Department

Population (2019)
  - Total: 1,374

Tohogodou is a village in the Bilanga Department of Gnagna Province in eastern Burkina Faso.

Population
Year	Pop.	±%
1985	524	—
2006	1,016	+93.9%
2019	1,374	+35.2%
