= Langnoassi =

- Country: Burkina Faso
- Region: Est Region
- Province: Gnagna Province
- Department: Piéla Department

Population (2019)
  - Total: 1,022

Langnoassi is a village in the Piéla Department of Gnagna Province in eastern Burkina Faso.

Population
Year	Pop.	±%
2006	728	—
2019	1,022	+40.4%
