= Bouskomi =

- Location in Burkina Faso
- Country: Burkina Faso
- Region: Est Region
- Province: Gnagna Province
- Department: Piéla Department

Population (2019)
  - Total: 1,319

Bouskomi is a village in the Piéla Department of Gnagna Province in eastern Burkina Faso.

Population
| Year | Pop. | ±% |
|---|---|---|
| 1985 | 473 | — |
| 2006 | 982 | +107.6% |
| 2019 | 1,319 | +34.3% |
