= Pognankanré =

Pognankanré Pognankare
- Country: Burkina Faso
- Region: Est Region
- Province: Gnagna Province
- Department: Bilanga Department

Population (2019)
  - Total: 2,684

Pognankanré is a town in the Bilanga Department of Gnagna Province in eastern Burkina Faso.

Population
Year	Pop.	±%
1985	1,281	—
2006	1,592	+24.3%
2019	2,684	+68.6%
