= Koadaba =

- Country: Burkina Faso
- Region: Est Region
- Province: Gnagna Province
- Department: Manni Department

Population (2019)
  - Total: 1,643

Koadaba is a town in the Manni Department of Gnagna Province in eastern Burkina Faso.

Population
Year	Pop.	±%
2006	917	—
2019	1,643	+79.2%
