= Sékouantou =

Sékouantou Sikavantou
- Location in Burkina Faso
- Coordinates: 12°31′N 0°0′E
- Country: Burkina Faso
- Region: Est Region
- Province: Gnagna Province
- Department: Bilanga Department

Population (2019)
  - Total: 1,679

Sékouantou is a town in the Bilanga Department of Gnagna Province in eastern Burkina Faso.

Population
Year	Pop.	±%
1985	1,123	—
2006	1,674	+49.1%
2019	1,679	+0.3%
