= Kodjoani-léoura =

- Interactive map of Kodjoani-léoura
- Country: Burkina Faso
- Region: Est Region
- Province: Gnagna Province
- Department: Bogandé Department

Population (2019)
  - Total: 1,734

Kodjoani-léoura is a village in the Bogandé Department of Gnagna Province in eastern Burkina Faso.

Population
Year	Pop.	±%
1985	524	—
2006	963	+83.8%
2019	1,734	+80.1%
