= Sagadou =

- Country: Burkina Faso
- Region: Est Region
- Province: Gnagna Province
- Department: Bilanga Department

Population (2019)
  - Total: 766

Sagadou is a village in the Bilanga Department of Gnagna Province in eastern Burkina Faso.

Population
Year	Pop.	±%
1985	538	—
2006	380	−29.4%
2019	766	+101.6%
