= Tambifoagou =

- Country: Burkina Faso
- Region: Est Region
- Province: Gnagna Province
- Department: Manni Department

Population (2019)
  - Total: 2,093

Tambifoagou is a town in the Manni Department of Gnagna Province in eastern Burkina Faso.

Population
Year	Pop.	±%
2006	1,229	—
2019	2,093	+70.3%
