= Tiguili =

Tiguili Tiquili
- Country: Burkina Faso
- Region: Est Region
- Province: Gnagna Province
- Department: Bilanga Department

Population (2019)
  - Total: 959

Tiguili is a village in the Bilanga Department of Gnagna Province in eastern Burkina Faso.

Population
Year	Pop.	±%
1985	322	—
2006	555	+72.4%
2019	959	+72.8%
