= Fétary =

Fétary Petary
- Country: Burkina Faso
- Region: Est Region
- Province: Gnagna Province
- Department: Bilanga Department

Population (2019)
  - Total: 2,523

Fétary is a town in the Bilanga Department of Gnagna Province in eastern Burkina Faso.

Population
Year	Pop.	±%
1985	379	—
2006	1,323	+249.1%
2019	2,523	+90.7%
