= Diankoudoungou =

Diankoudoungou Diankoudougou
- Location in Burkina Faso
- Coordinates: 12°25′N 0°10′W
- Country: Burkina Faso
- Region: Est Region
- Province: Gnagna Province
- Department: Bilanga Department

Population (2019)
  - Total: 2,625

Diankoudoungou is a town in the Bilanga Department of Gnagna Province in eastern Burkina Faso.

Population
Year	Pop.	±%
1985	1,505	—
2006	1,908	+26.8%
2019	2,625	+37.6%
