= Soultenga =

Soultenga Soulautenga
- Country: Burkina Faso
- Region: Est Region
- Province: Gnagna Province
- Department: Bilanga Department

Population (2019)
  - Total: 1,451

Soultenga is a town in the Bilanga Department of Gnagna Province in eastern Burkina Faso.

Population
| Year | Pop. | ±% |
|---|---|---|
| 1985 | 738 | — |
| 2006 | 911 | +23.4% |
| 2019 | 1,451 | +59.3% |
