= Moaka =

- Location in Burkina Faso
- Coordinates: 12°18′0″N 0°50′0″W
- Country: Burkina Faso
- Region: Est Region
- Province: Gnagna Province
- Department: Bilanga Department

Population (2019)
  - Total: 6,337

Moaka is a town in the Bilanga Department of Gnagna Province in eastern Burkina Faso.

Population
Year	Pop.	±%
1985	4,714	—
2006	5,561	+18.0%
2019	6,337	+14.0%
