= Dipienga =

- Location in Burkina Faso
- Coordinates: 12°47′N 0°12′E
- Country: Burkina Faso
- Region: Est Region
- Province: Gnagna Province
- Department: Bilanga Department

Population (2019)
  - Total: 8,951

Dipienga is a town in the Bilanga Department of Gnagna Province in eastern Burkina Faso.

Population
| Year | Pop. | ±% |
|---|---|---|
| 1985 | 8,131 | — |
| 2006 | 4,486 | −44.8% |
| 2019 | 8,951 | +99.5% |
