= Pantanloana =

Pantanloana Pantaloana
- Country: Burkina Faso
- Region: Est Region
- Province: Gnagna Province
- Department: Bilanga Department

Population (2019)
  - Total: 1,423

Pantanloana is a village in the Bilanga Department of Gnagna Province in eastern Burkina Faso.

Population
Year	Pop.	±%
1985	511	—
2006	833	+63.0%
2019	1,423	+70.8%
