= Doundougou =

Coordinates: 12°21′N 0°20′E

- Interactive map of Doundougou
- Country: Burkina Faso
- Region: Est Region
- Province: Gnagna Province
- Department: Bilanga Department

Population (2019)
  - Total: 559

Doundougou is a village in the Bilanga Department of Gnagna Province in eastern Burkina Faso.

Population
Year	Pop.	±%
2006	567	—
2019	559	−1.4%
