= Dinalaye =

- Interactive map of Dinalaye
- Country: Burkina Faso
- Region: Est Region
- Province: Gnagna Province
- Department: Liptougou Department

Population (2019 est.)
  - Total: 6,724

Dinalaye is a town in the Liptougou Department of Gnagna Province in eastern Burkina Faso.

== Geography ==
Dinalaye – a relatively isolated commune in the department – is located 30 km south-east of Liptougou.

Population
Year	Pop.	±%
2006	2,577	—
2019	6,724	+160.9%

== Health and education ==
Dinalaye hosts a health and social promotion center (CSPS).
