= Loagré =

Coordinates: 13°18′N 0°06′W

Loagré Logare
- Interactive map of Loagré
- Country: Burkina Faso
- Region: Est Region
- Province: Gnagna Province
- Department: Manni Department

Population (2019)
  - Total: 1,098

Loagré is a town in the Manni Department of Gnagna Province in eastern Burkina Faso.

Population
Year	Pop.	±%
1985	699	—
2006	1,078	+54.2%
2019	1,098	+1.9%
