= Yarba-Lampiadi =

- Interactive map of Yarba-Lampiadi
- Coordinates: 13°15′47″N 0°05′16″W
- Country: Burkina Faso
- Region: Est Region
- Province: Gnagna Province
- Department: Manni Department

Population (2019)
  - Total: 1,303

Yarba-Lampiadi is a town in the Manni Department of Gnagna Province in eastern Burkina Faso.

Population
Year	Pop.	±%
2006	1,015	—
2019	1,303	+28.4%
