= Boulyendé =

Coordinates: 12°57′N 0°52′W

- Interactive map of Boulyendé
- Country: Burkina Faso
- Region: Est Region
- Province: Gnagna Province
- Department: Manni Department

Population (2019)
  - Total: 1,120

Boulyendé is a town in the Manni Department of Gnagna Province in eastern Burkina Faso.

Population
Year	Pop.	±%
1985	1,455	—
2006	1,724	+18.5%
2019	1,120	−35.0%
