= Liougou =

Coordinates: 13°18′N 0°18′W

Liougou Liangou
- Interactive map of Liougou
- Country: Burkina Faso
- Region: Est Region
- Province: Gnagna Province
- Department: Manni Department

Population (2019)
  - Total: 1,824

Liougou is a town in the Manni Department of Gnagna Province in eastern Burkina Faso.

Population
Year	Pop.	±%
1985	690	—
2006	1,380	+100.0%
2019	1,824	+32.2%
