= Guitanga =

Coordinates: 13°04′N 0°49′E

- Interactive map of Guitanga
- Country: Burkina Faso
- Region: Est Region
- Province: Gnagna Province
- Department: Bogandé Department

Population (2019)
  - Total: 2,017

Guitanga is a village in the Bogandé Department of Gnagna Province in eastern Burkina Faso.

Population
Year	Pop.	±%
1985	340	—
2006	1,205	+254.4%
2019	2,017	+67.4%
