= Komonga =

- Location in Burkina Faso
- Coordinates: 13°0′N 0°5′W
- Country: Burkina Faso
- Region: Est Region
- Province: Gnagna Province
- Department: Bogandé Department

Population (2019)
  - Total: 2,844

Komonga is a town in the Bogandé Department of Gnagna Province in eastern Burkina Faso.

Population
| Year | Pop. | ±% |
|---|---|---|
| 1985 | 929 | — |
| 2006 | 1,605 | +72.8% |
| 2019 | 2,844 | +77.2% |
