= Tiapaga =

- Interactive map of Tiapaga
- Country: Burkina Faso
- Region: Est Region
- Province: Gnagna Province
- Department: Bilanga Department

Population (2019)
  - Total: 3,493

Tiapaga is a town in the Bilanga Department of Gnagna Province in eastern Burkina Faso.

Population
| Year | Pop. | ±% |
|---|---|---|
| 2006 | 3,304 | — |
| 2019 | 3,493 | +5.7% |
