= Thimborgou =

Thimborgou Tiambargou
- Country: Burkina Faso
- Region: Est Region
- Province: Gnagna Province
- Department: Bilanga Department

Population (2019)
  - Total: 474

Thimborgou is a village in the Bilanga Department of Gnagna Province in eastern Burkina Faso.

Population
Year	Pop.	±%
1985	208	—
2006	36	−82.7%
2019	474	+1216.7%
