= Koulmasga =

- Country: Burkina Faso
- Region: Est Region
- Province: Gnagna Province
- Department: Bilanga Department

Population (2019)
  - Total: 647

Koulmasga is a village in the Bilanga Department of Gnagna Province in eastern Burkina Faso.

Population
| Year | Pop. | ±% |
|---|---|---|
| 2006 | 492 | — |
| 2019 | 647 | +31.5% |
