= Tiongo-Pori =

- Country: Burkina Faso
- Region: Est Region
- Province: Gnagna Province
- Department: Piéla Department

Population (2019)
  - Total: 1,111

Tiongo-Pori is a village in the Piéla Department of Gnagna Province in eastern Burkina Faso.

Population
| Year | Pop. | ±% |
|---|---|---|
| 1985 | 869 | — |
| 2006 | 733 | −15.7% |
| 2019 | 1,111 | +51.6% |
