= Kamissi =

- Location in Burkina Faso
- Coordinates: 13°14′N 0°15′W
- Country: Burkina Faso
- Region: Est Region
- Province: Gnagna Province
- Department: Manni Department

Population (2019)
  - Total: 1,429

Kamissi is a village in the Manni Department of Gnagna Province in eastern Burkina Faso.

Population
Year	Pop.	±%
1985	393	—
2006	868	+120.9%
2019	1,429	+64.6%
