= Tiabdou =

Coordinates: 12°47′N 0°07′W

- Interactive map of Tiabdou
- Country: Burkina Faso
- Region: Est Region
- Province: Gnagna Province
- Department: Piéla Department

Population (2019)
  - Total: 1,868

Tiabdou is a town in the Piéla Department of Gnagna Province in eastern Burkina Faso.

Population
| Year | Pop. | ±% |
|---|---|---|
| 1985 | 630 | — |
| 2006 | 1,096 | +74.0% |
| 2019 | 1,868 | +70.4% |
