= Kankantchiaga =

Kankantchiaga Kankaoutiaga
- Interactive map of Kankantchiaga
- Country: Burkina Faso
- Region: Est Region
- Province: Gnagna Province
- Department: Manni Department

Population (2019)
  - Total: 592

Kankantchiaga is a village in the Manni Department of Gnagna Province in eastern Burkina Faso.

== Population ==
Population
Year	Pop.	±%
1985	1,129	—
2006	403	−64.3%
2019	592	+46.9%

== Geography ==
Kankantchiaga is an agropastoral settlement with scattered residential areas. It is located about 8 km southeast of Manni, the capital of the Manni Department, and approximately 4.5 km east of National Road 18.
