= Lipaka =

Coordinates: 13°19′N 0°17′W

- Interactive map of Lipaka
- Country: Burkina Faso
- Region: Est Region
- Province: Gnagna Province
- Department: Manni Department

Population (2019)
  - Total: 1,172

Lipaka is a town in the Manni Department of Gnagna Province in eastern Burkina Faso.

Population
Year	Pop.	±%
1985	1,529	—
2006	1,630	+6.6%
2019	1,172	−28.1%
