= Nindangou =

- Location in Burkina Faso
- Coordinates: 13°6′N 0°10′W
- Country: Burkina Faso
- Region: Est Region
- Province: Gnagna Province
- Department: Bogandé Department

Population (2019)
  - Total: 3,769

Nindangou is a town in the Bogandé Department of Gnagna Province in eastern Burkina Faso.

Population
Year	Pop.	±%
1985	2,599	—
2006	2,814	+8.3%
2019	3,769	+33.9%
