= Madori =

Coordinates: 13°04′N 0°03′E

- Interactive map of Madori
- Country: Burkina Faso
- Region: Est Region
- Province: Gnagna Province
- Department: Manni Department

Population (2019)
  - Total: 2,736

Madori is a town in the Manni Department of Gnagna Province in eastern Burkina Faso.

Population
Year	Pop.	±%
1985	662	—
2006	1,598	+141.4%
2019	2,736	+71.2%
