= Marmiga =

- Interactive map of Marmiga
- Country: Burkina Faso
- Region: Est Region
- Province: Gnagna Province
- Department: Piéla Department

Population (2019)
  - Total: 980

Marmiga is a village in the Piéla Department of Gnagna Province in eastern Burkina Faso.

Population
Year	Pop.	±%
2006	1,377	—
2019	980	−28.8%
