= Korongou =

- Interactive map of Korongou
- Country: Burkina Faso
- Region: Est Region
- Province: Gnagna Province
- Department: Piéla Department

Population (2019)
  - Total: 2,370

Korongou is a town in the Piéla Department of Gnagna Province in eastern Burkina Faso.

Population
Year	Pop.	±%
1985		—
2006	1,410	—
2019	2,370	+68.1%
