= Tiongo-Pani =

- Country: Burkina Faso
- Region: Est Region
- Province: Gnagna Province
- Department: Piéla Department

Population (2019)
  - Total: 1,661

Tiongo-Pani is a village in the Piéla Department of Gnagna Province in eastern Burkina Faso.

Population
Year	Pop.	±%
1985	616	—
2006	735	+19.3%
2019	1,661	+126.0%
