= Djibali, Burkina Faso =

Djibali
- Country: Burkina Faso
- Region: Est Region
- Province: Gnagna Province
- Department: Liptougou Department

Population (2019)
  - Total: 879

Djibali is a village in the Liptougou Department of Gnagna Province in eastern Burkina Faso.

Population
| Year | Pop. | ±% |
|---|---|---|
| 2006 | 368 | — |
| 2019 | 879 | +138.9% |

== Health and education ==
The closest health center to Djibali is the Bonsiéga health and social promotion center (CSPS).
