= Tampédou =

- Interactive map of Tampédou
- Country: Burkina Faso
- Region: Est Region
- Province: Gnagna Province
- Department: Bilanga Department

Population (2019)
  - Total: 4,351

Tampédou is a town in the Bilanga Department of Gnagna Province in eastern Burkina Faso.

Population
Year	Pop.	±%
1985	1,456	—
2006	2,759	+89.5%
2019	4,351	+57.7%
