= Namountergou =

Namountergou Namoutergan
- Country: Burkina Faso
- Region: Est Region
- Province: Gnagna Province
- Department: Bogandé Department

Population (2019)
  - Total: 960

Namountergou is a village in the Bogandé Department of Gnagna Province in eastern Burkina Faso.

Population
Year	Pop.	±%
1985	468	—
2006	1,701	+263.5%
2019	960	−43.6%
