= Djoari, Piéla =

Djoari
- Country: Burkina Faso
- Region: Est Region
- Province: Gnagna Province
- Department: Piéla Department

Population (2019)
  - Total: 558

Djoari is a village in the Piéla Department of Gnagna Province in eastern Burkina Faso.

Population
Year	Pop.	±%
1985	157	—
2006	311	+98.1%
2019	558	+79.4%
