= Léoura =

Léoura Leaura
- Location in Burkina Faso
- Coordinates: 12°56′N 0°7′E
- Country: Burkina Faso
- Region: Est Region
- Province: Gnagna Province
- Department: Bogandé Department

Population (2019)
  - Total: 3,303

Léoura is a town in the Bogandé Department of Gnagna Province in eastern Burkina Faso.

Population
Year	Pop.	±%
1985	1,073	—
2006	2,084	+94.2%
2019	3,303	+58.5%
