= Guimboari =

Guimboari Gimboari
- Interactive map of Guimboari
- Country: Burkina Faso
- Region: Est Region
- Province: Gnagna Province
- Department: Piéla Department

Population (2019)
  - Total: 1,161

Guimboari is a village in the Piéla Department of Gnagna Province in eastern Burkina Faso.

Population
Year	Pop.	±%
1985	644	—
2006	964	+49.7%
2019	1,161	+20.4%
