= Kohoura =

- Country: Burkina Faso
- Region: Est Region
- Province: Gnagna Province
- Department: Bogandé Department

Population (2019)
  - Total: 2,267

Kohoura is a town in the Bogandé Department of Gnagna Province in eastern Burkina Faso.

Population
Year	Pop.	±%
2006	2,063	—
2019	2,267	+9.9%
