= Kalembaogo =

- Interactive map of Kalembaogo
- Country: Burkina Faso
- Region: Est Region
- Province: Gnagna Province
- Department: Piéla Department

Population (2019)
  - Total: 1,256

Kalembaogo is a village in the Piéla Department of Gnagna Province in eastern Burkina Faso.

Population
Year	Pop.	±%
1985	457	—
2006	718	+57.1%
2019	1,256	+74.9%
