= Yougpankoudougou =

Yougpankoudougou Yougoupan Koudougou
- Country: Burkina Faso
- Region: Est Region
- Province: Gnagna Province
- Department: Bilanga Department

Population (2019)
  - Total: 500

Yougpankoudougou is a village in the Bilanga Department of Gnagna Province in eastern Burkina Faso.

Population
| Year | Pop. | ±% |
|---|---|---|
| 1985 | 429 | — |
| 2006 | 526 | +22.6% |
| 2019 | 500 | −4.9% |
