= Bourgou, Burkina Faso =

Bourgou
- Interactive map of Bourgou
- Coordinates: 13.0915°N 0.1456°W
- Country: Burkina Faso
- Region: Est Region
- Province: Gnagna Province
- Department: Manni Department

Population (2019)
  - Total: 2,813

Bourgou is a town in the Manni Department of Gnagna Province in eastern Burkina Faso.

Population
Year	Pop.	±%
1985	881	—
2006	1,957	+122.1%
2019	2,813	+43.7%
