= Yassoumbaga =

Yassoumbaga Yabsoumbaga
- Interactive map of Yassoumbaga
- Country: Burkina Faso
- Region: Est Region
- Province: Gnagna Province
- Department: Bilanga Department

Population (2019)
  - Total: 937

Yassoumbaga is a village in the Bilanga Department of Gnagna Province in eastern Burkina Faso.

Population
Year	Pop.	±%
1985	417	—
2006	807	+93.5%
2019	937	+16.1%
