= Gorgouin =

Gorgouin Gargouin
- Country: Burkina Faso
- Region: Est Region
- Province: Gnagna Province
- Department: Bogandé Department

Population (2019)
  - Total: 998

Gorgouin is a village in the Bogandé Department of Gnagna Province in eastern Burkina Faso.

Population
Year	Pop.	±%
1985	168	—
2006	559	+232.7%
2019	998	+78.5%
