= Dabilgou =

- Interactive map of Dabilgou
- Country: Burkina Faso
- Region: Est Region
- Province: Gnagna Province
- Department: Piéla Department

Population (2019)
  - Total: 842

Dabilgou is a village in the Piéla Department of Gnagna Province in eastern Burkina Faso.

Population
Year	Pop.	±%
1985	1,678	—
2006	734	−56.3%
2019	842	+14.7%
