= Thiargou =

- Interactive map of Thiargou
- Country: Burkina Faso
- Region: Est Region
- Province: Gnagna Province
- Department: Bogandé Department

Population (2019)
  - Total: 1,637

Thiargou is a town in the Bogandé Department of Gnagna Province in eastern Burkina Faso.

Population
Year	Pop.	±%
1985	544	—
2006	1,111	+104.2%
2019	1,637	+47.3%
