= Komboassi =

Komboassi may refer to:

In Gnagna Province, Burkina Faso:

- Komboassi, Bogandé
- Komboassi, Manni
