= Tanibiaga =

- Interactive map of Tanibiaga
- Coordinates: 12°42′15″N 0°12′50″E
- Country: Burkina Faso
- Region: Est Region
- Province: Gnagna Province
- Department: Bilanga Department

Population (2019)
  - Total: 1,104

Tanibiaga is a village in the Bilanga Department of Gnagna Province in eastern Burkina Faso.

Population
Year	Pop.	±%
2006	909	—
2019	1,104	+21.5%
