= Gabondi =

- Location in Burkina Faso
- Coordinates: 13°8′N 0°15′E
- Country: Burkina Faso
- Region: Est Region
- Province: Gnagna Province
- Department: Liptougou Department

Population (2019)
  - Total: 2,115

Gabondi is a town in the Liptougou Department of Gnagna Province in eastern Burkina Faso.

== Geography ==
Gabondi – an agro-pastoral commune with scattered residential centres – is located 7 km southwest of Liptougou on departmental road 18.

Population
| Year | Pop. | ±% |
|---|---|---|
| 2006 | 1,127 | — |
| 2019 | 2,115 | +87.7% |

== Health and education ==
The closest health center to Gabondi is the Liptougou health and social promotion center (CSPS).
