= Komona =

Coordinates: 13°17′N 0°19′W

- Interactive map of Komona
- Country: Burkina Faso
- Region: Est Region
- Province: Gnagna Province
- Department: Manni Department

Population (2019)
  - Total: 439

Komona is a village in the Manni Department of Gnagna Province in eastern Burkina Faso.

Population
Year	Pop.	±%
1985	124	—
2006	254	+104.8%
2019	439	+72.8%
