= Benfoaka =

- Location in Burkina Faso
- Country: Burkina Faso
- Region: Est Region
- Province: Gnagna Province
- Department: Bogandé Department

Population (2019)
  - Total: 2,627

Benfoaka is a town in the Bogandé Department, Gnagna Province in eastern Burkina Faso.

Population
Year	Pop.	±%
2006	1,772	—
2019	2,627	+48.3%
