= Tindané =

- Country: Burkina Faso
- Region: Est Region
- Province: Gnagna Province
- Department: Bilanga Department

Population (2019)
  - Total: 654

Tindané is a town in the Bilanga Department of Gnagna Province in eastern Burkina Faso.

Population
Year	Pop.	±%
2006	1,481	—
2019	654	−55.8%
