= Gayéri (department) =

- Department
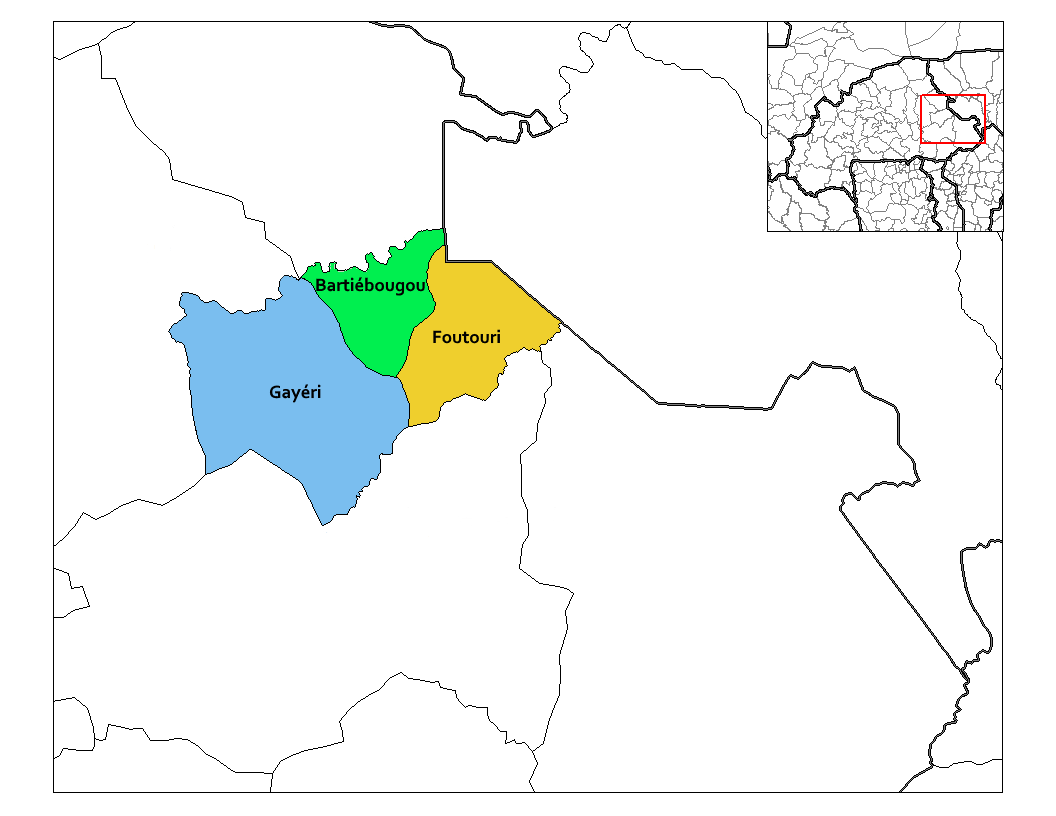
- Gayéri Department location in the province
- Country: Burkina Faso
- Region: Est Region
- Province: Komondjari Province

Area
  - Department: 1,117 sq mi (2,894 km^{2})

Population (2019 census)
  - Department: 76,201
  - Density: 68.20/sq mi (26.33/km^{2})
  - Urban: 15,170
- Time zone: UTC+0 (GMT 0)

Gayéri is a department or commune of Komondjari Province in Burkina Faso.

== Towns ==
The department consists of a chief town :

- Gayéri

and 24 villages:

- Bandikidini
- Bassiéri
- Boalla
- Bouogou
- Carimama
- Diabatou
- Djora
- Gamboudéni
- Gnifoagma
- Komompouma
- Kopialga
- Kotougou
- Kourgou
- Lonadéni
- Louanga
- Maldiabari
- Maldianga
- Nalidougou
- N'Bina
- Yeah
- Soualimou
- Tiargou
- Tiboudi
- Toumbenga.
