= Margou, Piéla =

Margou
- Interactive map of Margou
- Country: Burkina Faso
- Region: Est Region
- Province: Gnagna Province
- Department: Piéla Department

Population (2019)
  - Total: 3,056

Margou is a town in the Piéla Department of Gnagna Province in eastern Burkina Faso.

Population
Year	Pop.	±%
1985	1,583	—
2006	1,919	+21.2%
2019	3,056	+59.2%
