= Doyana, Piéla =

Doyana Doyama
- Interactive map of Doyana
- Country: Burkina Faso
- Region: Est Region
- Province: Gnagna Province
- Department: Piéla Department

Population (2019)
  - Total: 1,108

Doyana is a village in the Piéla Department of Gnagna Province in eastern Burkina Faso.

Population
Year	Pop.	±%
1985	569	—
2006	957	+68.2%
2019	1,108	+15.8%
