= Dimkoura =

- Interactive map of Dimkoura
- Coordinates: 13.06098°N 0.36181°W
- Country: Burkina Faso
- Region: Est Region
- Province: Gnagna Province
- Department: Thion Department

Population (2019)
  - Total: 922

Dimkoura is a village in the Thion Department of Gnagna Province in eastern Burkina Faso.

Population
Year	Pop.	±%
1985	289	—
2006	271	−6.2%
2019	922	+240.2%
