= Bangaye, Manni =

Bangaye
- Interactive map of Bangaye
- Coordinates: 13.19639°N 0.16694°W
- Country: Burkina Faso
- Region: Est Region
- Province: Gnagna Province
- Department: Manni Department

Population (2019)
  - Total: 1,144

Bangaye is a village in the Manni Department of Gnagna Province in eastern Burkina Faso.

Population
Year	Pop.	±%
1985	445	—
2006	833	+87.2%
2019	1,144	+37.3%
