= Doyana =

Doyana may refer to several places in Burkina Faso:

- Doyana, Coalla
- Doyana, Piéla
- Doyana, Thion
