= Kankalsi, Piéla =

Kankalsi Kankassi
- Location in Burkina Faso
- Coordinates: 12°49′N 0°1′E
- Country: Burkina Faso
- Region: Est Region
- Province: Gnagna Province
- Department: Piéla Department
- Elevation: 293 m (961 ft)

Population (2019)
  - Total: 1,051

Kankalsi (Kankassi) is a village in the Piéla Department of Gnagna Province in eastern Burkina Faso.

Population
Year	Pop.	±%
1985	228	—
2006	862	+278.1%
2019	1,051	+21.9%
