= Banogo =

Banogo Banaogo
- Country: Burkina Faso
- Region: Est Region
- Province: Gnagna Province
- Department: Thion Department

Population (2019)
  - Total: 1,089

Banogo is a village in the Thion Department of Gnagna Province in eastern Burkina Faso.

Population
| Year | Pop. | ±% |
|---|---|---|
| 1985 | 579 | — |
| 2006 | 592 | +2.2% |
| 2019 | 1,089 | +84.0% |
