= Jibali =

Jibali or Djibali may refer to:

- something related to Jibal, a historical region in western Iran
- Jibbali language, a Modern South Arabian language of Oman
- Jebali, an Arabic name (including a list of people with the name)
- Djibali, Burkina Faso, a village in Burkina Faso

== See also ==
- Jabali, a character in Hindu mythology
