= Koulbila =

- Interactive map of Koulbila
- Country: Burkina Faso
- Region: Est Region
- Province: Gnagna Province
- Department: Thion Department

Population (2019)
  - Total: 982

Koulbila is a village in the Thion Department of Gnagna Province in eastern Burkina Faso.

Population
Year	Pop.	±%
1985	328	—
2006	493	+50.3%
2019	982	+99.2%
