= Bossongri, Bilanga =

Coordinates: 12°54′N 0°54′E

Bossongri
- Interactive map of Bossongri
- Country: Burkina Faso
- Region: Est Region
- Province: Gnagna Province
- Department: Bilanga Department

Population (2019)
  - Total: 3,853

Bossongri is a town in the Bilanga Department of Gnagna Province in eastern Burkina Faso.

Population
Year	Pop.	±%
2006	2,075	—
2019	3,853	+85.7%
