= Kankalsi =

Kankalsi may refer to several places in Burkina Faso:

- Kankalsi, Bogandé
- Kankalsi, Piéla
