= Margou =

Margou may refer to several places in Burkina Faso:

- Margou, Manni
- Margou, Piéla
