= Bossongri =

Bossongri may refer to these places in Burkina Faso:

- Bossongri, Bilanga
- Bossongri, Thion
