= Bangaye =

Bangaye may refer to several places in Burkina Faso:

- Bangaye, Manni
- Bangaye, Thion
