= Bogoumissi =

- Interactive map of Bogoumissi
- Country: Burkina Faso
- Region: Est Region
- Province: Gnagna Province
- Department: Thion Department

Population (2019)
  - Total: 455

Bogoumissi is a village in the Thion Department of Gnagna Province in eastern Burkina Faso.

Population
Year	Pop.	±%
1985	515	—
2006	948	+84.1%
2019	455	−52.0%
