= 2026 Gayéri attack =

2026 battle in Burkina Faso

2026 Gayéri Attack
- Part of Islamist insurgency in Burkina Faso
Date	30 June 2026
Location	Gayéri, Komondjari Province; Solhan, Sebba, Yagha Province, Burkina Faso
Result	Burkinabe Victory

Belligerents
Burkina Faso Armed Forces: 20th Rapid Intervention Battalion (BIR); VDP	Jama'at Nusrat al-Islam wal Muslimin

Casualties and losses
3 killed several wounded (per Burkina Faso)	400+ (per Burkina Faso); 250 motorcycles recovered

On 30 June 2026, Burkinabe Forces repelled a large scale assault in Gayéri, in the Komondjari Province, and Solhan and Sebba in the Yagha Province.

== Background ==
Since 2014, Burkina Faso has been facing a deadly Islamist insurgency across the country. In the tri-border area, jihadist groups like JNIM and IS-GS have been very active, carrying out fast-paced attacks on military forces in the area. Solhan was previously the site of large massacre in 2021. Gayéri also faced another attack in 2025, in which 41 jihadists were killed.

== Attack ==
The assaults were simultaneously launched at the same time in an attempt to overwhelm the defenses. The attacks were first spotted by VDP militiamen, who were able to get reinforcements in time to stop the attackers. Air support was also utlized during the defense.

== Aftermath ==
In the aftermath of the battle, Burkinabe forces recovered 250 motorcycles, 353 firearms, and an assortment of equipment. The Burkinabe accused the French government of being behind, claiming it was launched in response to Burkina Faso severing relationships with France.
