= Tipoli =

- Interactive map of Tipoli
- Country: Burkina Faso
- Region: Est Region
- Province: Gnagna Province
- Department: Thion Department

Population (2019)
  - Total: 973

Tipoli is a town in the Thion Department of Gnagna Province in eastern Burkina Faso.

Population
Year	Pop.	±%
1985	860	—
2006	1,793	+108.5%
2019	973	−45.7%
