= Mopienga =

- Location in Burkina Faso
- Coordinates: 13°06′N 0°0′E
- Country: Burkina Faso
- Region: Est Region
- Province: Gnagna Province
- Department: Manni Department

Population (2019)
  - Total: 3,180

Mopienga is a town in the Manni Department of Gnagna Province in eastern Burkina Faso.

Population
Year	Pop.	±%
1985	4,011	—
2006	2,131	−46.9%
2019	3,180	+49.2%
