= Sékoussi =

Sékoussi Sekaussi
- Country: Burkina Faso
- Region: Est Region
- Province: Gnagna Province
- Department: Thion Department

Population (2019)
  - Total: 664

Sékoussi is a village in the Thion Department of Gnagna Province in eastern Burkina Faso.

Population
Year	Pop.	±%
1985	351	—
2006	404	+15.1%
2019	664	+64.4%
