= Folbongou =

- Interactive map of Folbongou
- Country: Burkina Faso
- Region: Est Region
- Province: Gnagna Province
- Department: Thion Department

Population (2019)
  - Total: 1,073

Folbongou is a village in the Thion Department of Gnagna Province in eastern Burkina Faso.

Population
Year	Pop.	±%
1985	325	—
2006	556	+71.1%
2019	1,073	+93.0%
