= Dioro-Folgou =

- Interactive map of Dioro-Folgou
- Country: Burkina Faso
- Region: Est Region
- Province: Gnagna Province
- Department: Thion Department

Population (2019)
  - Total: 679

Dioro-Folgou is a village in the Thion Department of Gnagna Province in eastern Burkina Faso.

Population
Year	Pop.	±%
2006	316	—
2019	679	+114.9%
