= Banga, Burkina Faso =

Banga
- Town
- Interactive map of Banga
- Coordinates: 12.4625°N 0.1869°W
- Country: Burkina Faso
- Region: Est Region
- Province: Gnagna Province
- Department: Bilanga Department

Population (2019)
  - Total: 1,646

Banga is a town in the Bilanga Department of Gnagna Province, Burkina Faso.

Population
Year	Pop.	±%
1985	850	—
2006	784	−7.8%
2019	1,646	+109.9%
