= Margou, Manni =

Coordinates: 12°49′N 0°10′E

Margou
- Interactive map of Margou
- Country: Burkina Faso
- Region: Est Region
- Province: Gnagna Province
- Department: Manni Department

Population (2019)
  - Total: 701

Margou is a village in the Manni Department of Gnagna Province in eastern Burkina Faso.

Population
Year	Pop.	±%
1985	475	—
2006	629	+32.4%
2019	701	+11.4%
