= Kankalsi, Bogandé =

Coordinates: 13°07′N 0°18′W

Kankalsi Suol Enkak Kankalsi
- Interactive map of Kankalsi
- Country: Burkina Faso
- Region: Est Region
- Province: Gnagna Province
- Department: Bogandé Department

Population (2019)
  - Total: 3,115

Kankalsi is a town in the Bogandé Department of Gnagna Province in eastern Burkina Faso.

Population
Year	Pop.	±%
1985	1,073	—
2006	1,544	+43.9%
2019	3,115	+101.7%
