= Lelcom =

Lelcom Lericom
- Interactive map of Lelcom
- Country: Burkina Faso
- Region: Est Region
- Province: Gnagna Province
- Department: Thion Department

Population (2019)
  - Total: 1,733

Lelcom is a village in the Thion Department of Gnagna Province in eastern Burkina Faso.

Population
Year	Pop.	±%
1985	492	—
2006	888	+80.5%
2019	1,733	+95.2%
