= Komboassi, Bogandé =

Komboassi
- Interactive map of Komboassi
- Coordinates: 13°03′42″N 0°14′08″W
- Country: Burkina Faso
- Region: Est Region
- Province: Gnagna Province
- Department: Bogandé Department

Population (2019)
  - Total: 1,894

Komboassi is a town in the Bogandé Department of Gnagna Province in eastern Burkina Faso.

Population
Year	Pop.	±%
1985	863	—
2006	1,566	+81.5%
2019	1,894	+20.9%
