= Laranga =

- Interactive map of Laranga
- Country: Burkina Faso
- Region: Est Region
- Province: Gnagna Province
- Department: Thion Department

Population (2019)
  - Total: 1,059

Laranga is a village in the Thion Department of Gnagna Province in eastern Burkina Faso.

Population
Year	Pop.	±%
1985	293	—
2006	640	+118.4%
2019	1,059	+65.5%
