= Dadounga =

- Location in Burkina Faso
- Coordinates: 13°16′N 0°12′E
- Country: Burkina Faso
- Region: Est Region
- Province: Gnagna Province
- Department: Liptougou Department

Population (2019 est.)
  - Total: 3,449

Dadounga is a town in the Liptougou Department of Gnagna Province in eastern Burkina Faso.

== Geography ==
Dadounga is located 15 km northwest of Liptougou.

Population
Year	Pop.	±%
2006	2,746	—
2019 (est.)	3,449	+25.6%

== Health and education ==
The closest health center to Dadounga is the Liptougou health and social promotion center (CSPS).
