= Folbombouga =

Folbombouga Falbombougou
- Interactive map of Folbombouga
- Country: Burkina Faso
- Region: Est Region
- Province: Gnagna Province
- Department: Thion Department

Population (2019)
  - Total: 1,352

Folbombouga is a village in the Thion Department of Gnagna Province in eastern Burkina Faso.

Population
Year	Pop.	±%
1985	108	—
2006	133	+23.1%
2019	1,352	+916.5%
