= Monlori =

- Interactive map of Monlori
- Country: Burkina Faso
- Region: Est Region
- Province: Gnagna Province
- Department: Thion Department

Population (2019)
  - Total: 818

Monlori is a town in the Thion Department of Gnagna Province in eastern Burkina Faso.

Population
Year	Pop.	±%
1985	730	—
2006	1,078	+47.7%
2019	818	−24.1%
