= Komboassi, Manni =

Komboassi
- Country: Burkina Faso
- Region: Est Region
- Province: Gnagna Province
- Department: Manni Department

Population (2019)
  - Total: 906

Komboassi is a town in the Manni Department of Gnagna Province in eastern Burkina Faso.

Population
Year	Pop.	±%
1985	683	—
2006	977	+43.0%
2019	906	−7.3%
