= Lalguin =

- Interactive map of Lalguin
- Country: Burkina Faso
- Region: Est Region
- Province: Gnagna Province
- Department: Thion Department

Population (2019)
  - Total: 1,299

Lalguin is a village in the Thion Department of Gnagna Province in eastern Burkina Faso.

Population
Year	Pop.	±%
1985	316	—
2006	408	+29.1%
2019	1,299	+218.4%
