= Gnindi =

Coordinates: 13°06′N 0°24′W

- Interactive map of Gnindi
- Country: Burkina Faso
- Region: Est Region
- Province: Gnagna Province
- Department: Thion Department

Population (2019)
  - Total: 678

Gnindi is a village in the Thion Department of Gnagna Province in eastern Burkina Faso.

Population
Year	Pop.	±%
1985	364	—
2006	577	+58.5%
2019	678	+17.5%
