= Siéssin =

Siéssin Sessi
- Country: Burkina Faso
- Region: Est Region
- Province: Gnagna Province
- Department: Thion Department

Population (2019)
  - Total: 887

Siéssin is a town in the Thion Department of Gnagna Province in eastern Burkina Faso.

Population
Year	Pop.	±%
1985	435	—
2006	1,248	+186.9%
2019	887	−28.9%
