= Foutouri (department) =

- Department
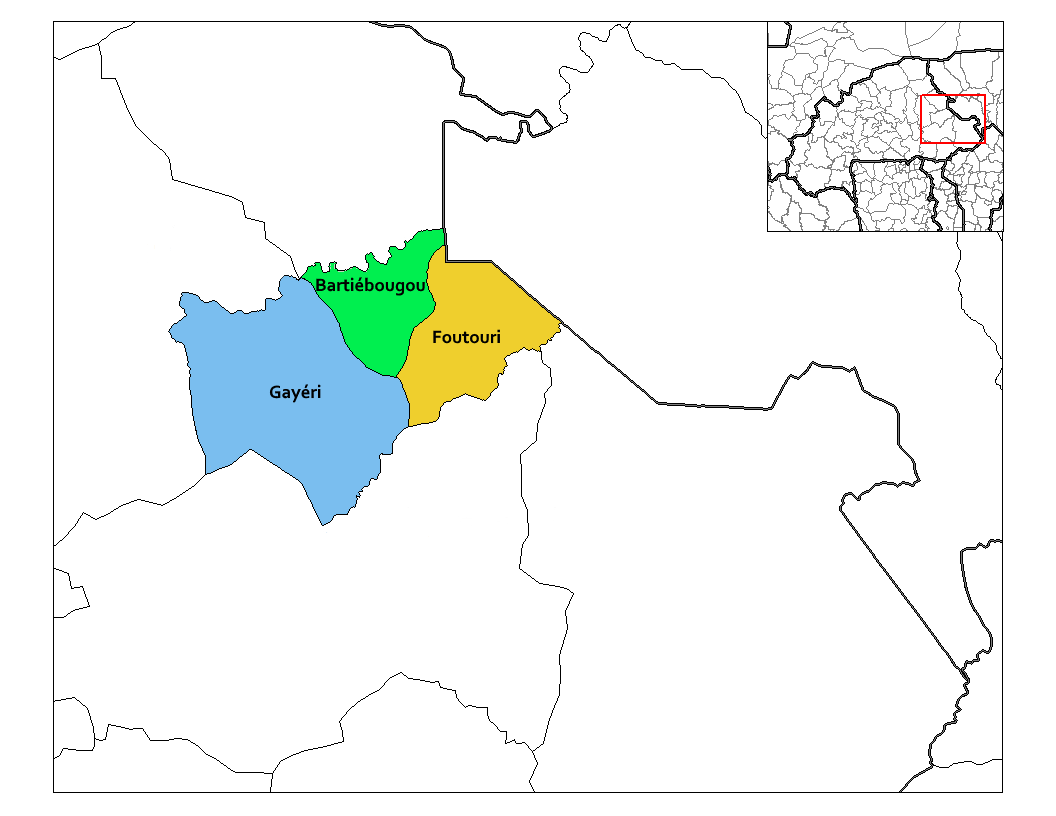
- Foutouri Department location in the province
- Country: Burkina Faso
- Region: Est Region
- Province: Komondjari Province

Population (2012)
  - Total: 17,933
- Time zone: UTC+0 (GMT 0)

Foutouri is a department or commune of Komondjari Province in Burkina Faso.

== Cities ==
The department consists of a chief town:

- Foutouri

and 11 villages:

- Bartiébougou-Fulani
- Bontégou
- Bossongri
- Gourel-Cowpea
- Haaba
- Kienkièga
- Paagou
- Paagou-Fulani
- Penkatougou
- Tambiga
- Tambissonguima.
