= Bossongri, Thion =

Bossongri Bossongui
- Country: Burkina Faso
- Region: Est Region
- Province: Gnagna Province
- Department: Thion Department

Population (2019)
  - Total: 1,045

Bossongri is a village in the Thion Department of Gnagna Province in eastern Burkina Faso.

Population
Year	Pop.	±%
1985	315	—
2005 (est.)	666	+111.4%
2019	1,045	+56.9%
