= Diaka, Burkina Faso =

Coordinates: 12°59′N 0°20′W

Diaka
- Interactive map of Diaka
- Country: Burkina Faso
- Region: Est Region
- Province: Gnagna Province
- Department: Thion Department

Population (2019)
  - Total: 2,930

Diaka is a town in the Thion Department of Gnagna Province in eastern Burkina Faso.

Population
Year	Pop.	±%
1985	1,547	—
2006	2,815	+82.0%
2019	2,930	+4.1%
