= Doyana, Thion =

Doyana
- Country: Burkina Faso
- Region: Est Region
- Province: Gnagna Province
- Department: Thion Department

Population (2019)
  - Total: 1,454

Doyana is a village in the Thion Department of Gnagna Province in eastern Burkina Faso.

Population
Year	Pop.	±%
1985	306	—
2006	1,068	+249.0%
2019	1,454	+36.1%
