= Piéla =

- Interactive map of Piéla
- Country: Burkina Faso
- Region: Est Region
- Province: Gnagna Province
- Department: Piéla Department

Population (2019)
  - Total: 12,785

Piéla is the capital of the Piéla Department of Gnagna Province in eastern Burkina Faso.

Population
Year	Pop.	±%
1985	5,984	—
2006	8,894	+48.6%
2019	12,785	+43.7%
