= Diaka =

Diaka may refer to:

- Diaka, Mali
- Diaka, Burkina Faso
