= Bilanga =

- Location in Burkina Faso
- Coordinates: 12°32′52″N 0°0′10″W
- Country: Burkina Faso
- Region: Est Region
- Province: Gnagna Province
- Department: Bilanga Department

Population (2019)
  - Total: 6,748

Bilanga is the capital of the Bilanga Department of Gnagna Province in eastern Burkina Faso.

== History ==
Bilanga was at one point the capital of the Gourma region, and fought several wars against the Songhai Empire. After his decisive loss at the Battle of Tondibi and his subsequent deposition, Askia Ishaq II sought refuge in the town. But the first night he was there, the vengeful population stormed the house where his party was staying and killed him.

Population
| Year | Pop. | ±% |
|---|---|---|
| 1985 | 2,460 | — |
| 2006 | 3,893 | +58.3% |
| 2019 | 6,748 | +73.3% |
