= Bangaye, Thion =

Bangaye Bagaye
- Country: Burkina Faso
- Region: Est Region
- Province: Gnagna Province
- Department: Thion Department

Population (2019)
  - Total: 616

Bangaye is a village in the Thion Department of Gnagna Province in eastern Burkina Faso.

Population
Year	Pop.	±%
1985	264	—
2006	508	+92.4%
2019	616	+21.3%
