= Dioro, Burkina Faso =

Coordinates: 10°25′N 3°00′W

Dioro
- Interactive map of Dioro
- Country: Burkina Faso
- Region: Est Region
- Province: Gnagna Province
- Department: Thion Department

Population (2019)
  - Total: 542

Dioro is a village in the Thion Department of Gnagna Province in eastern Burkina Faso.

Population
Year	Pop.	±%
1985	531	—
2006	893	+68.2%
2019	542	−39.3%
