= Dioro =

Dioro may refer to

- Dioro, Mali
- Dioro, Burkina Faso
