= Kokou =

Kokou may refer to:

- Kokou (god)
- Kokou, Burkina Faso
