= Balamba =

Balamba may refer to:

- Balamba, Burkina Faso
- Balamba, Democratic Republic of the Congo
