= Balamba, Burkina Faso =

Balamba Balemba
- Country: Burkina Faso
- Region: Est Region
- Province: Gnagna Province
- Department: Thion Department

Population (2019)
  - Total: 1,354

Balamba is a town in the Thion Department of Gnagna Province in eastern Burkina Faso.

Population
Year	Pop.	±%
1985	1,010	—
2006	1,481	+46.6%
2019	1,354	−8.6%
