= Thion =

Thion may refer to:

== People ==
- Jérôme Thion (born 1977), French rugby union player
- Serge Thion (1942–2017), French sociologist and Holocaust denier
- Thione Seck (born 1955), Senegalese musician

== Places ==
- Thion, Burkina Faso, town in Burkina Faso
- Thion, an island in Vanuatu
