= Manni =

- Location in Burkina Faso
- Coordinates: 13°15′36″N 0°12′34″W
- Country: Burkina Faso
- Region: Est Region
- Province: Gnagna Province
- Department: Manni Department

Population (2019)
  - Total: 15,066

Manni is the capital of the Manni Department of Gnagna Province in eastern Burkina Faso.

== Geography ==
=== Location and environment ===
Manni is located 35 km north of Bogandé, the provincial capital, and 30 km south of Taparko.

It is on the edge of a tributary of the Faga River, on which the Manni embankment dam was built.

=== Demography ===
Population
| Year | Pop. | ±% |
|---|---|---|
| 1985 | 3,373 | — |
| 2006 | 7,441 | +120.6% |
| 2019 | 15,066 | +102.5% |

== History ==
Between October 6 and 8 2024, JNIM militants attacked the town and massacred at least 150 civilians and burned down much of the town. The initial attacks occurred after the terrorists cut off mobile networks, where they then proceeded to attack the main market of the town. The following day, they returned to the town to attack the hospital. On the final day, the terrorists returned to massacre all the men they could find.

== Economy ==
Economic and commercial center of the department, the village benefits from its central location for trade between the north and the south of the province of Gnagna.

== Transports ==
The village is crossed by national road 18.

== Health and education ==
Manni hosts a medical center and a health and social promotion center (CSPS).
