= Thion, Burkina Faso =

Coordinates: 13°04′N 0°19′W

Thion
- Interactive map of Thion
- Country: Burkina Faso
- Region: Est Region
- Province: Gnagna Province
- Department: Thion Department

Population (2019)
  - Total: 3,041

Thion is the capital of the Thion Department of Gnagna Province in eastern Burkina Faso.

Population
Year	Pop.	±%
1985	1,720	—
2006	3,044	+77.0%
2019	3,041	−0.1%
