= Thion Department =

Coordinates: 13°04′32″N 0°19′20″W

Thion
- Department
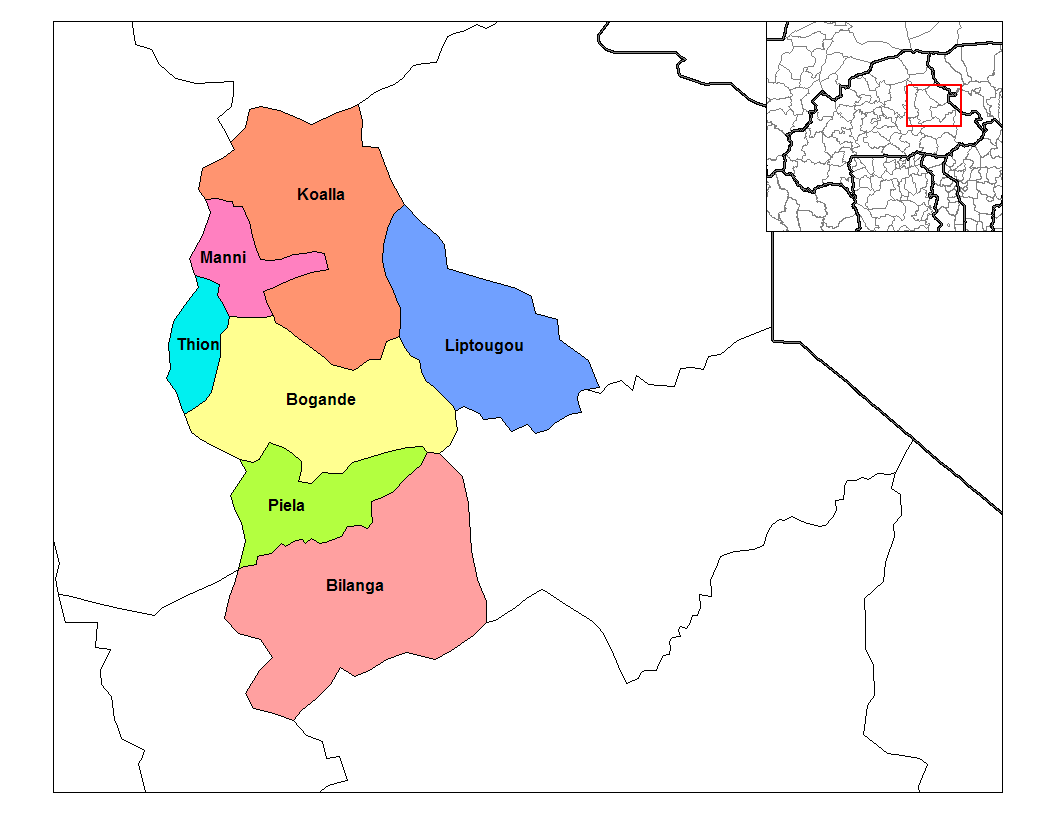
- Thion Department location in the province
- Country: Burkina Faso
- Province: Gnagna Province

Area
  - Total: 129.2 sq mi (334.7 km^{2})

Population (2019 census)
  - Total: 41,216
  - Density: 318.9/sq mi (123.1/km^{2})
- Time zone: UTC+0 (GMT 0)

Thion is a department or commune of Gnagna Province in northern Burkina Faso. Its capital lies at the town of Thion.

== Towns and villages ==
- Balamba
- Bangaye
- Bangayéni
- Banogo
- Bogoumissi
- Bossongri
- Diaka
- Dimkoura
- Dioro
- Dioro-Folgou
- Doyana
- Folbombouga
- Folbongou
- Folgou
- Gnindi
- Harga
- Koulbila
- Lalguin
- Laranga
- Lelcom
- Monlori
- Morèm
- Nawèga
- Sékoussi
- Siéssin
- Tamièla
- Tipoli
