= Solhan =

Solhan may refer to:

- Solhan Department, municipality in Sahel Region, Burkina Faso
  - Solhan and Tadaryat massacres, a 2021 massacre perpetrated by JNIM.
- Solhan District, district of Bingöl Province in Turkey.
  - Solhan, Bingöl, seat of the Solhan District
