= Jebali =

Jebali is an Arabic surname, it may refer to:

- Amor Jebali (born 1956), Tunisian footballer
- Hamadi Jebali (born 1949), Tunisian engineer and politician
- Issam Jebali (born 1991), Tunisian footballer
- Raja Jebali (born 1997), Tunisian para-athlete
- Zied Jebali (born 1990), Tunisian footballer
