= Komondjari Province =

Coordinates: 12°40′N 0°40′E

Komondjari
- Province
- Location in Burkina Faso

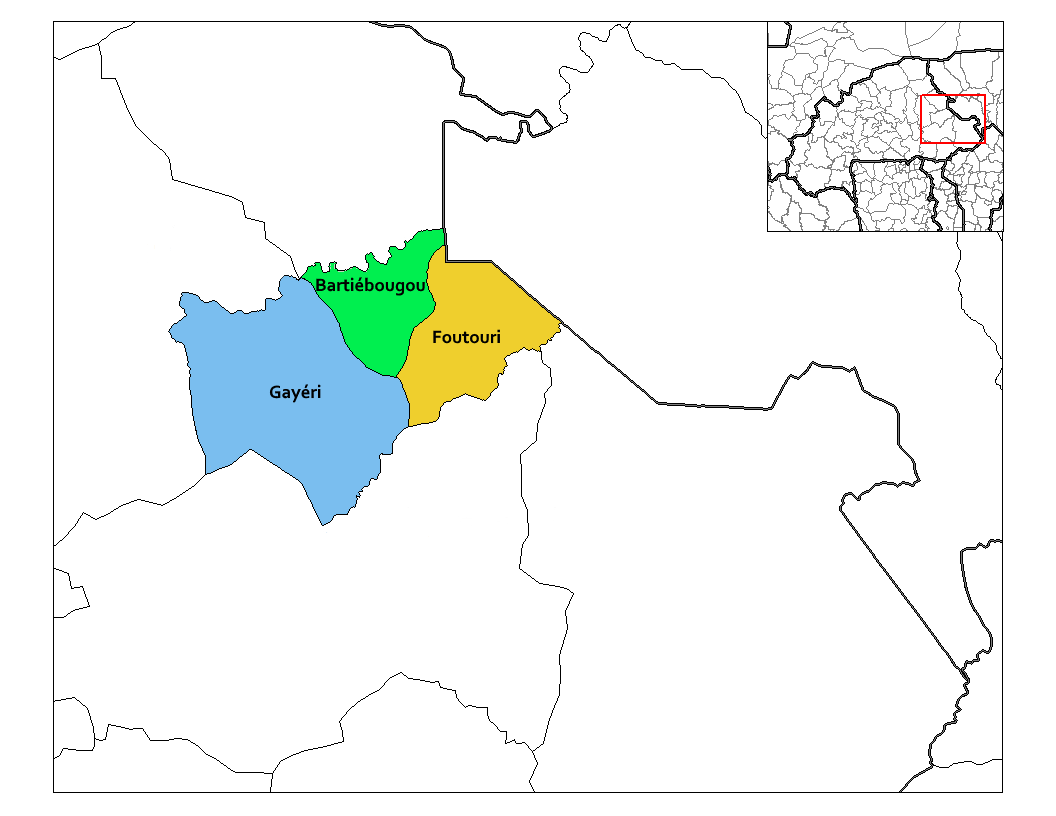
- Provincial map of its departments
- Country: Burkina Faso
- Region: Est Region
- Capital: Gayéri

Area
  - Province: 5,043 km^{2} (1,947 sq mi)

Population (2019 census)
  - Province: 105,584
  - Density: 20.94/km^{2} (54.23/sq mi)
  - Urban: 15,170
- Time zone: UTC+0 (GMT 0)

Komondjari is one of the 45 provinces of Burkina Faso, located in its Est Region. Its capital (and only town) is Gayéri.

== Departments ==
The province is divided into 3 departments.

The Departments of Komondjari
Department	Capital city	Population (Census 2006)
Bartiébougou Department	Bartiébougou	16,232
Foutouri Department	Foutouri	15,001
Gayéri Department	Gayéri	48,814
