= Gayéri =

- Location within Burkina Faso, West Africa
- Coordinates: 12°39′N 0°30′E
- Country: Burkina Faso

Population (2019 census)
  - Total: 15,170
- Time zone: UTC+0 (GMT)

Gayéri is a town located in the province of Komondjari in Burkina Faso. It is the capital of Komondjari Province.

== History ==
On 25 October 2025, JNIM attacked the town; the attack was repelled after 41 jihadists were killed.

Another attack occurred on 30 June 2026, in which 400 militants were killed.
