= Bonsiega =

Coordinates: 13°28′N 0°12′W

- Interactive map of Bonsiega
- Country: Burkina Faso
- Region: Est Region
- Province: Gnagna Province
- Department: Liptougou Department

Population (2019)
  - Total: 7,961

Bonsiega is a town in the Liptougou Department of Gnagna Province in eastern Burkina Faso.

== Geography ==
Bonsiéga is a commune with scattered residential centers. It is located 33 km south-east of Liptougou.

Population
| Year | Pop. | ±% |
|---|---|---|
| 1985 | 3,249 | — |
| 2006 | 4,110 | +26.5% |
| 2019 | 7,961 | +93.7% |

== Health and education ==
Bonsiéga hosts a health and social promotion center (CSPS).
