= Liptougou =

- Location in Burkina Faso
- Coordinates: 13°10′44″N 0°19′20″E
- Country: Burkina Faso
- Region: Est Region
- Province: Gnagna Province
- Department: Liptougou Department

Population (2019)
  - Total: 3,970

Liptougou is the capital of the Liptougou Department of Gnagna Province in eastern Burkina Faso.

== Geography ==
Liptougou is located 55 km east of Bogandé, the provincial capital. It is on the right bank of the Faga River, on which the Liptougou embankment dam was built.

Population
Year	Pop.	±%
1985	7,874	—
2006	3,332	−57.7%
2019	3,970	+19.1%

== Health and education ==
Liptougou hosts a health and social promotion center (CSPS).
