= Liptougou Department =

Coordinates: 13°10′44″N 0°19′20″E

Liptougou
- Department
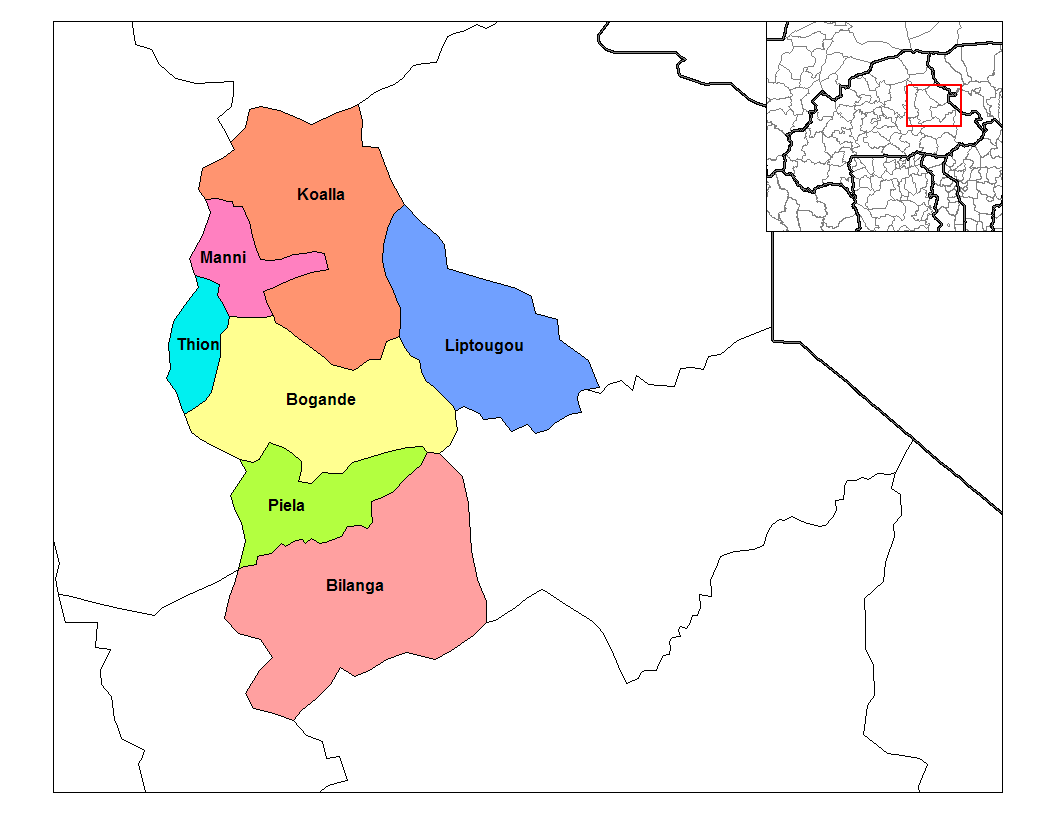
- Liptougou Department location in the province
- Country: Burkina Faso
- Province: Gnagna Province

Area
  - Total: 511 sq mi (1,324 km^{2})

Population (2019)
  - Total: 75,570
  - Density: 147.8/sq mi (57.08/km^{2})
- Time zone: UTC+0 (GMT 0)

Liptougou is a department or commune of Gnagna Province in northern Burkina Faso. Its capital lies at the town of Liptougou.

== Towns and villages ==
Bonsiega is a town located within the department.
