= Bogandé Department =

Coordinates: 12.9670°N 0.1500°W

Bogande
- Department
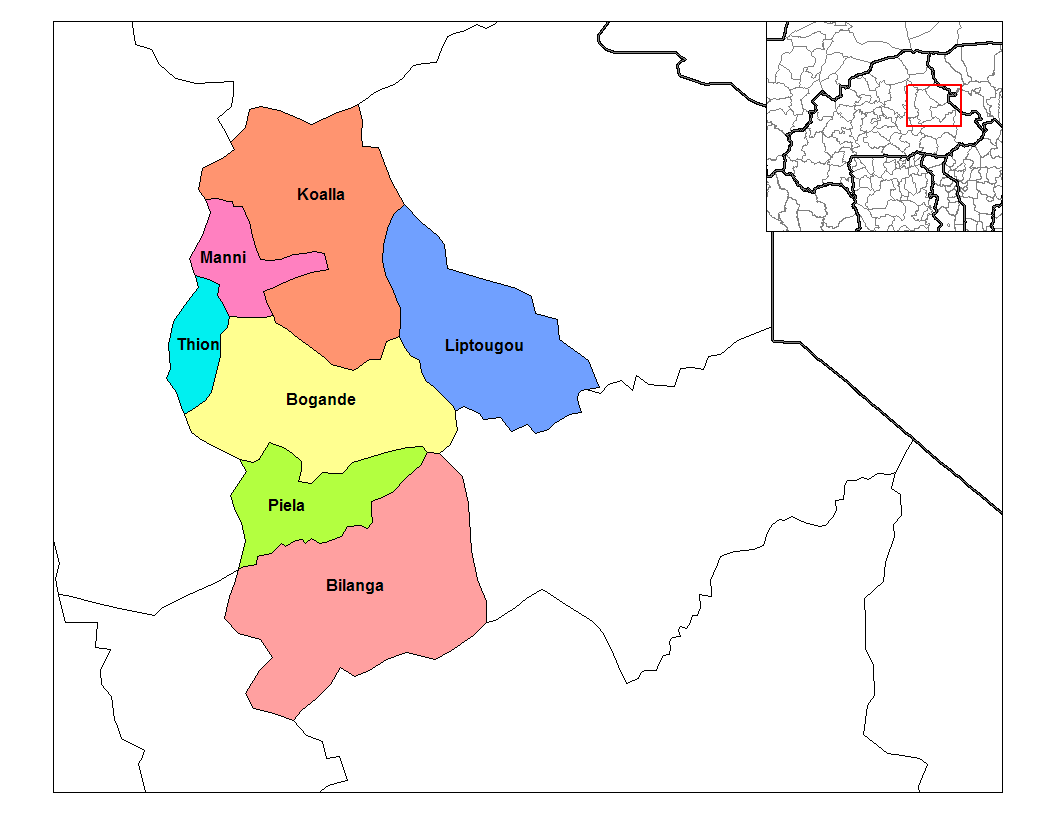
- Bogandé Department location in the province
- Country: Burkina Faso
- Province: Gnagna Province

Area
  - Department: 584 sq mi (1,512 km^{2})

Population (2019 census)
  - Department: 128,943
  - Density: 220.9/sq mi (85.28/km^{2})
  - Urban: 21,443
- Time zone: UTC+0 (GMT 0)

Bogande is a department or commune of Gnagna Province in northern Burkina Faso. Its capital is the town of Bogande.

== Demographics ==
The population of Bogandé is approximately 335,571 inhabitants in 2013. The population density is 52.2 inhabitants per square kilometer. The literacy rate is around 60%. The major ethnic groups include Gourmantché, Mossi, Fulani, Bellas, Hausa

== Economy ==
The primary economic activity in the region is subsistence agriculture.

== Geography ==
The area is mostly a flat savanna with low shrubby trees.

=== Climate ===
The average rainfall was 622.9 mm of water in 2011.

== Transport ==
The local road network is in poor condition. Heavy rains can make local roads nearly impassable, poisoning a serious problem for the inhabitants.

== Towns and villages ==
Towns and villages include Dapili, Ouapassi and Thierry.
