= Piéla Department =

Coordinates: 12°42′37″N 0°07′57″W

Piela
- Department
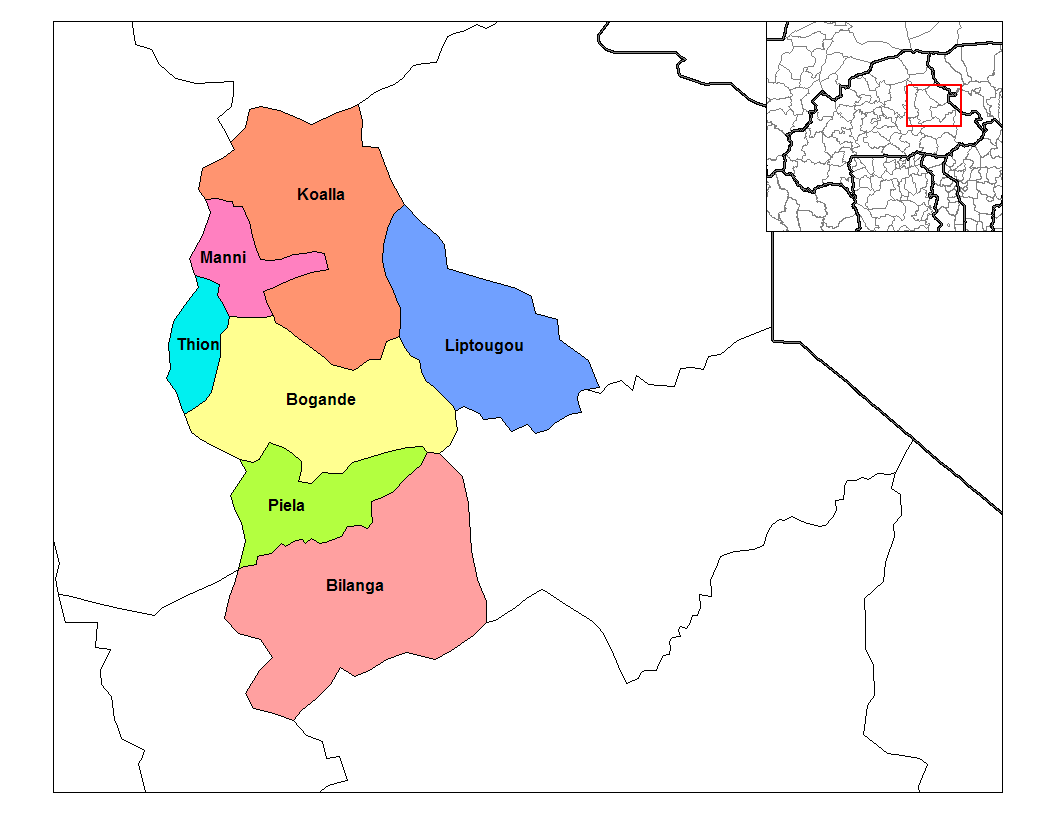
- Piela Department location in the province
- Country: Burkina Faso
- Province: Gnagna Province

Area
  - Total: 318.7 sq mi (825.4 km^{2})

Population (2019 census)
  - Total: 79,488
  - Density: 249.4/sq mi (96.30/km^{2})
- Time zone: UTC+0 (GMT 0)

Piéla is a department or commune of Gnagna Province in northern Burkina Faso. Its capital lies at the town of Piela.

Bad Münstereifel is a twin town of Piéla. From there the commune gets help to help themselves, so that for example the drinking water supply could be saved.
