= Manni Department =

Coordinates: 13°15′30″N 0°12′47″W

Manni
- Department
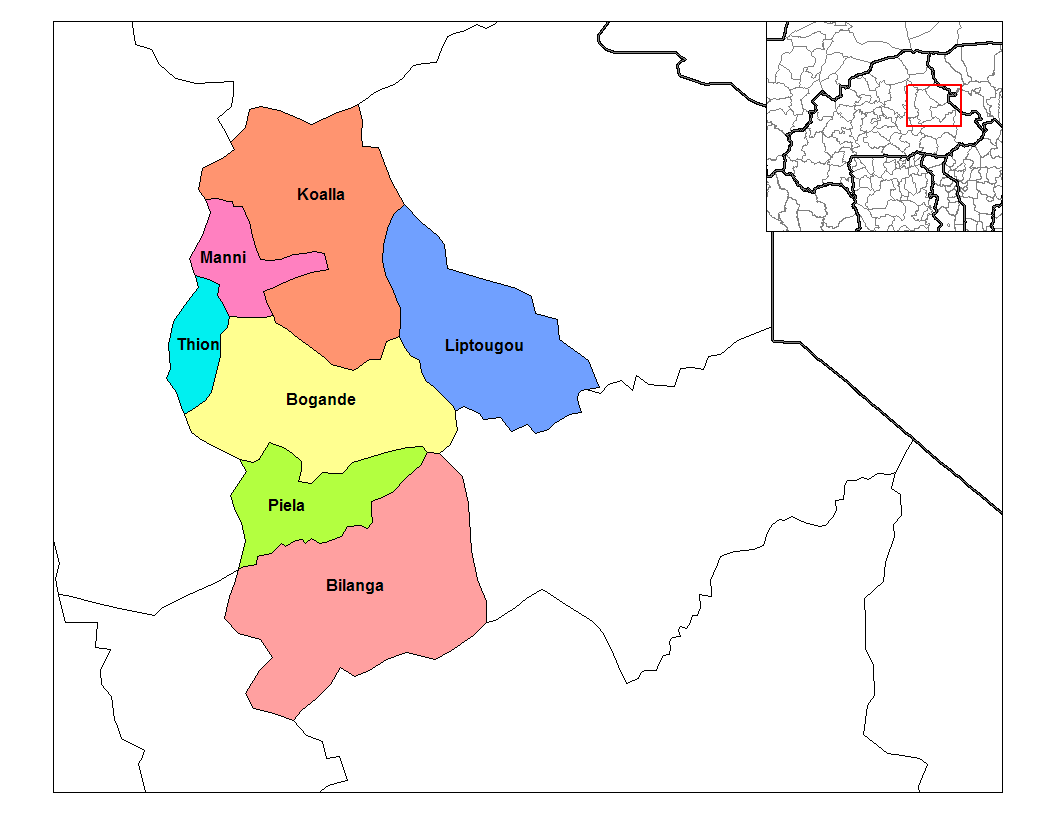
- Manni Department location in the province
- Country: Burkina Faso
- Province: Gnagna Province

Area
  - Total: 176.5 sq mi (457.2 km^{2})

Population (2019 census)
  - Total: 124,433
  - Density: 704.9/sq mi (272.2/km^{2})
- Time zone: UTC+0 (GMT 0)

Manni is a department or commune of Gnagna Province in northern Burkina Faso. Its capital is the town of Manni.
