= Bilanga Department =

Coordinates: 12°32′52″N 0°02′10″W

Bilanga
- Department
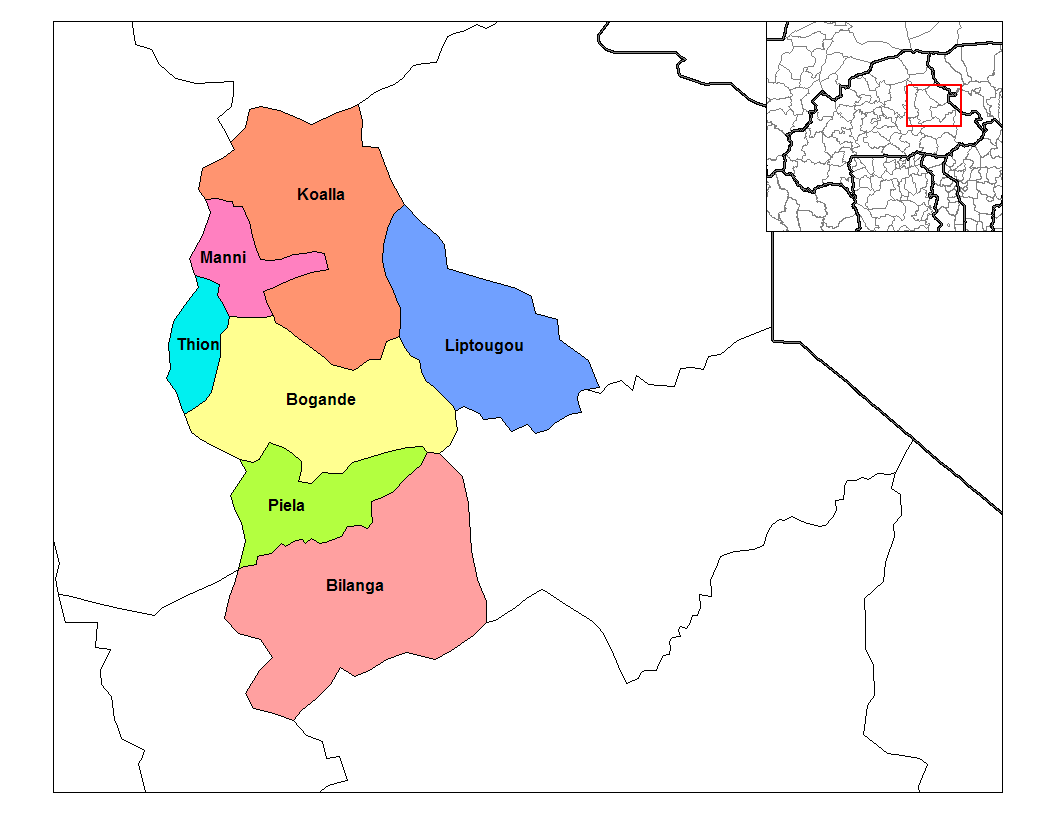
- Bilanga Department location in the province
- Country: Burkina Faso
- Province: Gnagna Province

Area
  - Total: 817 sq mi (2,117 km^{2})

Population (2019 census)
  - Total: 139,905
  - Density: 171.2/sq mi (66.09/km^{2})
- Time zone: UTC+0 (GMT 0)

Bilanga is a department or commune of Gnagna Province in northern Burkina Faso. Its capital is the town of Bilanga.

== Towns and villages ==
- Banga
