= Gnagna Province =

Coordinates: 12.9714°N 0.1436°W

Gnagna
- Province
- Location in Burkina Faso

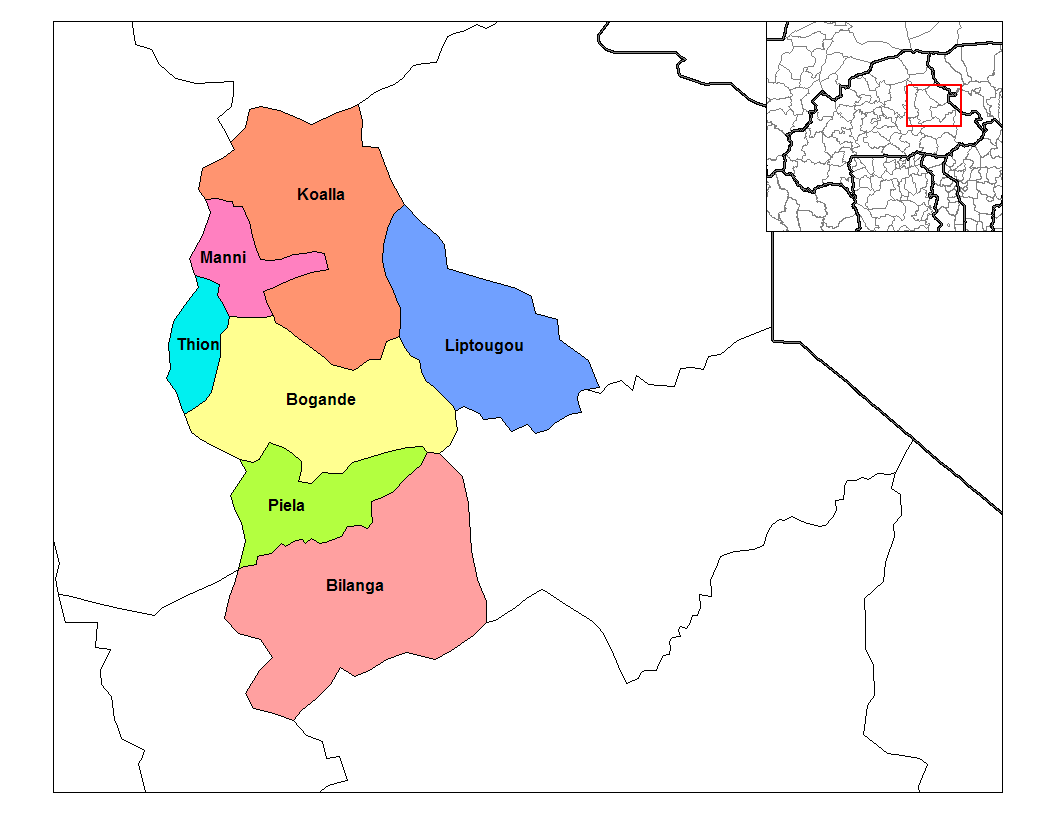
- Provincial map of its departments
- Country: Burkina Faso
- Region: Est Region
- Capital: Bogandé

Area
  - Province: 8,470 km^{2} (3,270 sq mi)

Population (2019 estimate)
  - Province: 675,897
  - Density: 79.8/km^{2} (207/sq mi)
  - Urban: 21,443
- Time zone: UTC+0 (GMT 0)

Gnagna is one of the 45 provinces of Burkina Faso, and is in Est Region. The capital of Gnagna is Bogandé. The population of Gnagna in 2019 was 675,897.

== Subdivision ==
Gnagna is divided into 7 departments:

The Departments of Ganzourgou
Commune	Capital	Population (Census 2006)
Bilanga Department	Bilanga	92,667
Bogandé Department	Bogandé	82,892
Coalla Department	Coalla	43,370
Liptougou Department	Liptougou	41,807
Manni Department	Manni	68,293
Piéla Department	Piéla	55,672
Thion Department	Thion	23,038

== See also ==
- Regions of Burkina Faso
- Provinces of Burkina Faso
- Departments of Burkina Faso
