= Goulmou Region =

Region of Burkina Faso

Goulmou Est
- Region
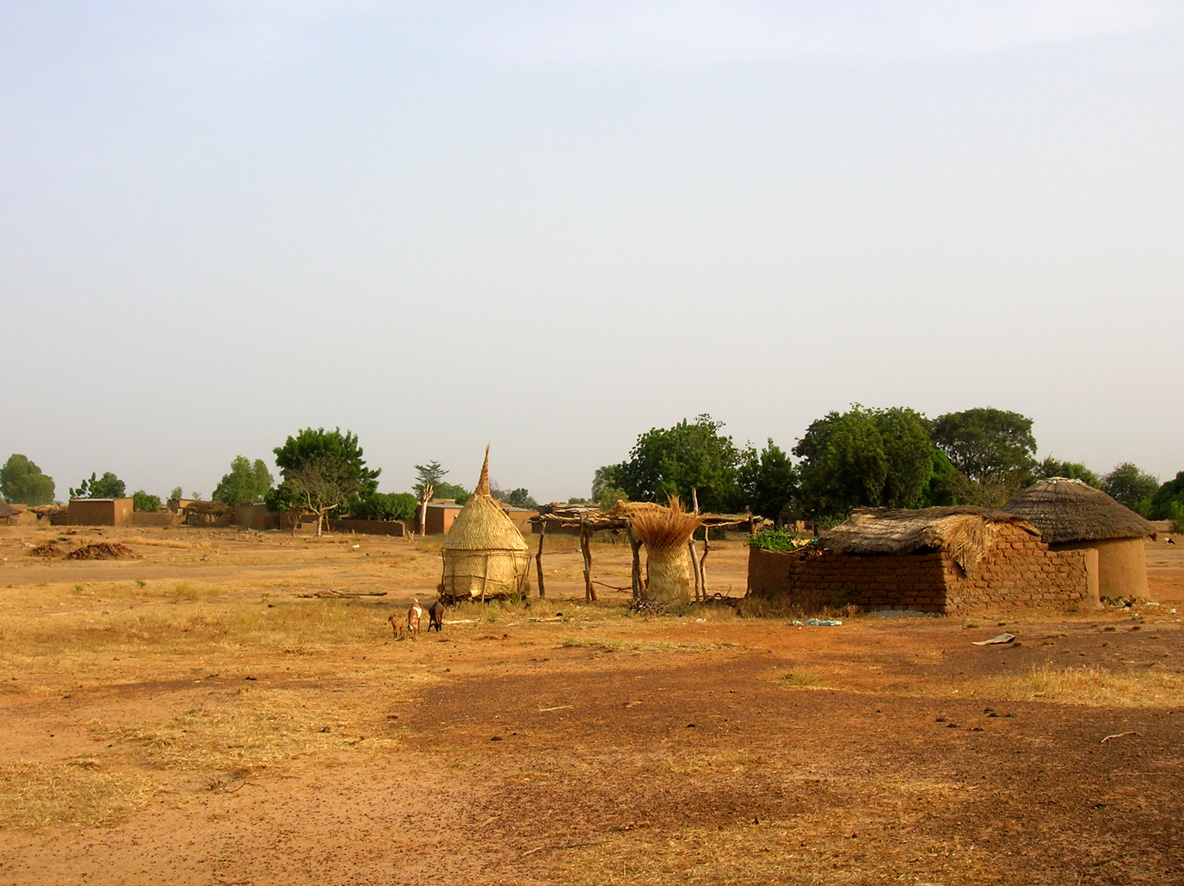

- Location in Burkina Faso
- Coordinates: 12°0′N 1°0′W
- Country: Burkina Faso
- Capital: Fada N'gourma

Area
  - Region: 17,849 sq mi (46,228 km^{2})

Population (2019 census)
  - Region: 1,941,505
  - Density: 108.78/sq mi (41.998/km^{2})
  - Urban: 138,916
- Time zone: UTC+0 (GMT 0)
- HDI (2017): 0.332 low · 12th

Goulmou, formerly known as Est ([ɛst], "East"), is one of Burkina Faso's 17 administrative regions. It was created on 2 July 2001. The region's capital is Fada N'gourma. Two provinces make up the region—Gourma and Kompienga.

As of 2019, the population of the region was 1,941,505 with 51% females. The population in the region was 9.47% of the total population of the country. The child mortality rate was 98, infant mortality rate was 98 and the mortality of children under five was 186. As of 2007, the literacy rate in the region was 28.5%, compared with a national average of 28.3%. The coverage of cereal need compared with the total production of the region was 108%.

== Geography ==
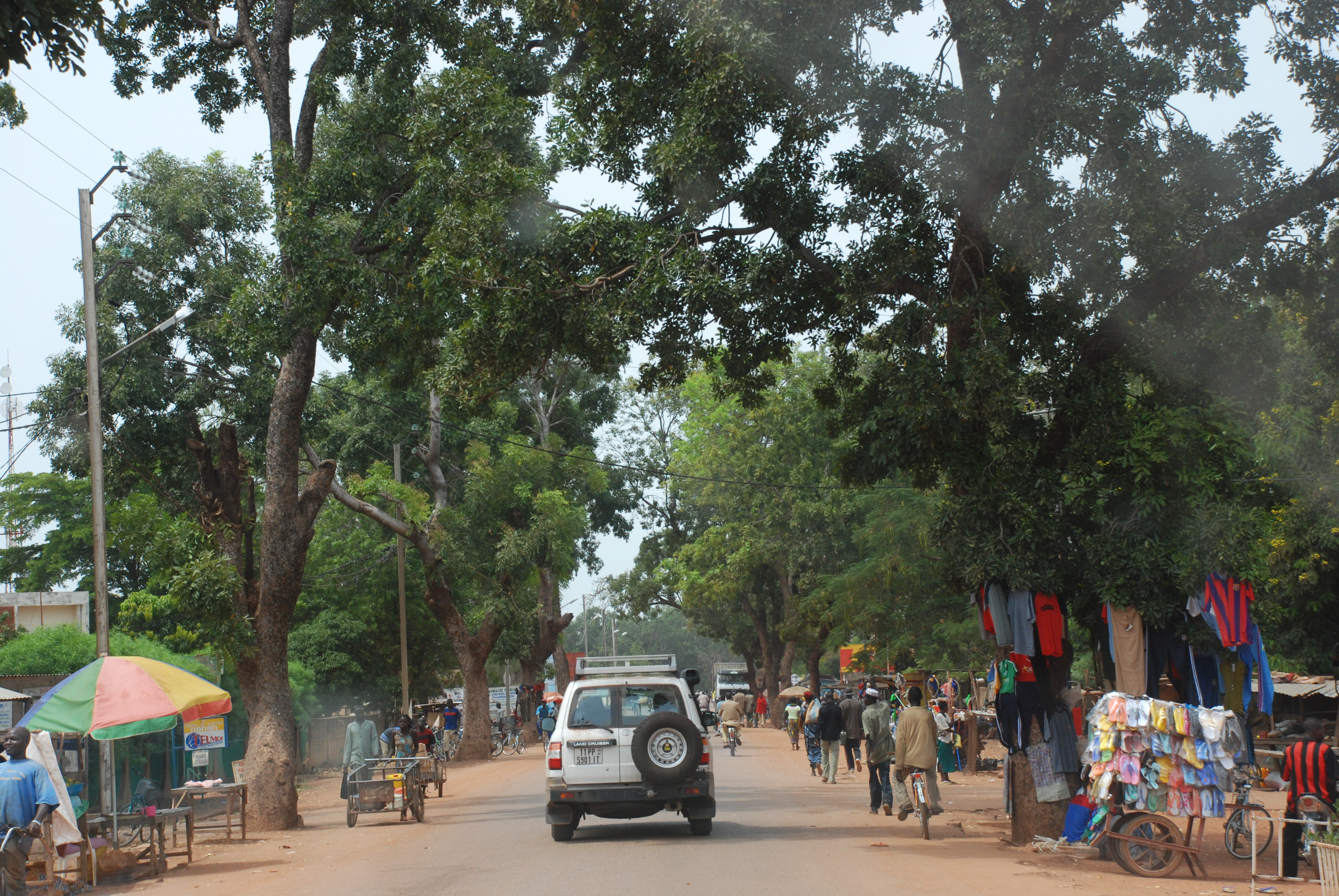
The main street in Fada N'gourma

Most of Burkina Faso is a wide plateau formed by riverine systems and is called falaise de Banfora. There are three major rivers, the Red Volta, Black Volta and White Volta, which cut through different valleys. The climate is generally hot, with unreliable rains across different seasons. Gold and quartz are common minerals found across the country, while manganese deposits are also common. The dry season is usually from October to May, and rains are common during the wet season from June to September. The soil texture is porous and hence the yield is also poor. The average elevation is around 200 m (660 ft) to 300 m (980 ft) above mean sea level. Among West African countries, Burkina Faso has the largest elephant population, and the country is replete with game reserves. The southern regions are more tropical in nature and have savannah and forests. The principal river is the Black Volta, that originates in the southern region and drains into Ghana. The areas near the rivers usually have flies like tsetse and similium, which are carriers of sleep sickness and river blindness. The average rainfall in the region is around 100 cm (39 in) compared with northern regions that receive only 25 cm (9.8 in) rainfall.

== Demographics ==
Historical population
Year	Pop.	±% p.a.
1985	626,173	—
1996	853,706	+2.86%
2006	1,212,284	+3.57%
2019	1,941,505	+3.69%

As of 2019, the population of the region was 1,941,505 with 51% females. The population in the region was 9.47% of the total population of the country. The child mortality rate was 98, infant mortality rate was 98 and the mortality of children under five was 186. As of 2007, among the working population, there were 62.3% employees, 3.3% under employed, 32.6% inactive people, 34.4% not working and 1.8% unemployed people in the region.

== Economy ==
As of 2007, there were 960.2 km (596.6 mi) of highways, 369.8 km (229.8 mi) of regional roads and 514 km (319 mi) of county roads. The first set of car traffic was 29, first set of two-wheeler traffic was 2,610 and the total classified road network was 1,844. The total corn produced during 2015 was 85,485 tonnes, cotton was 53,645 tonnes, cowpea was 44,098 tonnes, ground nut was 38,078 tonnes, millet was 87,588 tonnes, rice was 34,907 tonnes and sorghum was 193,161 tonnes. The coverage of cereal need compared with the total production of the region was 108.00 per cent. As of 2007, the literacy rate in the region was 28.5 per cent, compared with a national average of 28.3 per cent. The gross primary enrolment was 50.4 per cent, pos-primary was 15.7 per cent and gross secondary school enrolment was 3.7. There were 424 boys and 137 girls enrolled in the primary and post-secondary level. There were 43 teachers in primary & post-secondary level, while there were 489 teachers in post-primary and post-secondary level.

== Administration ==
Provinces (Old)	Capital	2006
Gnagna Province	Bogandé	407,739
Gourma Province	Fada N'gourma	304,169
Komondjari Province	Gayéri	80,047
Kompienga Province	Pama	75,662
Tapoa Province	Diapaga	341,782

Burkina Faso gained independence from France in 1960. It was originally called Upper Volta. There have been military coups until 1983 when Captain Thomas Sankara took control and implemented radical left-wing policies. He was ousted by Blaise Compaore, who continued for 27 years until 2014, when a popular uprising ended his rule. As per Law No.40/98/AN in 1998, Burkina Faso adhered to decentralization to provide administrative and financial autonomy to local communities. There are 13 administrative regions, each governed by a Governor. The regions are subdivided into 45 provinces, which are further subdivided into 351 communes. The communes may be urban or rural and are interchangeable. There are other administrative entities like department and village. An urban commune has typically 10,000 people under it. If any commune is not able to get 75 per cent of its planned budget in revenues for 3 years, the autonomy is taken off. The communes are administered by elected Mayors. The communes are stipulated to develop economic, social and cultural values of its citizens. A commune has financial autonomy and can interact with other communes, government agencies or international entities.
