= Soula =

Soula may refer to:

== People ==
- Abdel Salem Ben Magh Soula (born 1961), Algerian handball player
- Marc Soula (1945–2012), French entomologist
- Racha Soula (born 1994), Tunisian rower

== Places ==
=== Burkina Faso ===
- Soula, Bazèga, village in the Kombissiri Department of Bazèga Province in central Burkina Faso
- Soula, Boulkiemdé, town in the Thyou Department of Boulkiemdé Province in central western Burkina Faso
- Soula, Gnagna, town in the Coalla Department of Gnagna Province in eastern Burkina Faso

=== France ===
- Soula, Ariège, commune in the Ariège department in southwestern France

== Other ==
- Malo Soula, 1996 album by Serbian pop duo K2

== See also ==
- Soulas
