= Thiouré =

- Interactive map of Thiouré
- Country: Burkina Faso
- Region: Est Region
- Province: Gnagna Province
- Department: Coalla Department

Population (2019 est.)
  - Total: 2,611

Thiouré is a village in the Coalla Department of Gnagna Province in eastern Burkina Faso. The village has a population of 908.

== Geography ==
Thiouré – which is an agro-pastoral locality dispersed in several residential centers – is located 25 km northeast of Coalla.

Population
Year	Pop.	±%
2006	978	—
2019 (est.)	2,611	+167.0%

== Health and education ==
The closest health center to Thiouré is the Kourori health and social promotion center (CSPS).

Access to healthcare in Thiouré has also been supported through a mobile clinic intervention introduced in the village to improve access to health services, particularly for women and children.
