= Baka, Burkina Faso =

Baka
- Location in Burkina Faso
- Country: Burkina Faso
- Region: Est Region
- Province: Gnagna Province
- Department: Coalla Department

Population (2019)
  - Total: 1,459

Baka is a village in the Coalla Department of Gnagna Province in eastern Burkina Faso. ⑨

== Geography ==
Baka, an agro-pastoral locality scattered in several residential centers, is 15 km southeast of Coalla.

Population
Year	Pop.	±%
2006	550	—
2019	1,459	+165.3%

== Health and Education ==
The nearest health center in Baka is the Health and Social Promotion Centre (HSPC) in Boukargou.
