= Soula, Burkina Faso =

Soula, Burkina Faso may refer to:

- Soula, Bazèga
- Soula, Boulkiemdé
- Soula, Gnagna
