= Poka =

Poka may refer to:

- The portmanteau word which refers collectively to the universities of POSTECH and KAIST, two of South Korea's most prestigious universities focused on science and technology
- a blunder
- a collective term for Greek poker variations
- Poka-yoke, a mistake-proof system
- Poka, Burkina Faso, a town in Burkina Faso
- Poka, Saare County, village in Leisi Parish, Saare County, Estonia
- Poka, Tartu County, village in Mäksa Parish, Tartu County, Estonia
- Póka, the Hungarian name for Păingeni village, Glodeni Commune, Mureș County, Romania
- Poka (story), a 1948 story by Premendra Mitra
