= Banidjoari =

Coordinates: 13°24′N 0°09′W

Banidjoari Banni-Dioari
- Interactive map of Banidjoari
- Country: Burkina Faso
- Region: Est Region
- Province: Gnagna Province
- Department: Coalla Department

Population (2019)
  - Total: 1,230

Banidjoari is a village in the Coalla Department of Gnagna Province in eastern Burkina Faso.

== Geography ==
Banidjoari lies 2.5 km southwest of Coalla – and 16 km northeast of National Road 18 – on the other side of the Faga.

Population
Year	Pop.	±%
1985	183	—
2006	385	+110.4%
2019	1,230	+219.5%

== Health and education ==
The nearest health center in Banidjoari is the Health and Social Promotion Centre (HSPC) in Neiba.
