= Samboandi =

Samboandi may refer to:

In Gnagna Province, Burkina Faso:

- Samboandi, Coalla
- Samboandi, Manni
