= Mossadéni =

- Location in Burkina Faso
- Coordinates: 13°16′30″N 0°08′39″W
- Country: Burkina Faso
- Region: Est Region
- Province: Gnagna Province
- Department: Coalla Department

Population (2019 est.)
  - Total: 2,824

Mossadéni is a village in the Coalla Department of Gnagna Province in eastern Burkina Faso. The village has a population of 991.

== Geography ==
Mossadéni, an agropastoral locality scattered in several residential centers, is 35 km southeast of Coalla.

Population
Year	Pop.	±%
2006	1,058	—
2019 (est.)	2,824	+166.9%

== Health and education ==
The nearest health center in Mossadéni is the Health and Social Promotion Center (HSPC) in Boukargou.
