= Bamasgou =

- Interactive map of Bamasgou
- Coordinates: 13.511839°N 0.12063°W
- Country: Burkina Faso
- Region: Est Region
- Province: Gnagna Province
- Department: Coalla Department

Population (2019)
  - Total: 2,970

Bamasgou is a town in the Coalla Department of Gnagna Province in eastern Burkina Faso.

== Geography ==
Bamasgou, an agro-pastoral locality scattered in several residential centres, is about 11 km north of Coalla.

Population
| Year | Pop. | ±% |
|---|---|---|
| 1985 | 1,395 | — |
| 2006 | 1,460 | +4.7% |
| 2019 | 2,970 | +103.4% |

== Health and education ==
The nearest health center in Bamasgou is the Bonsiega health and social promotion center (HSPC).
