= Poka (story) =

1948 GhanaDa novel by Premendra Mitra

Poka (The Insect)
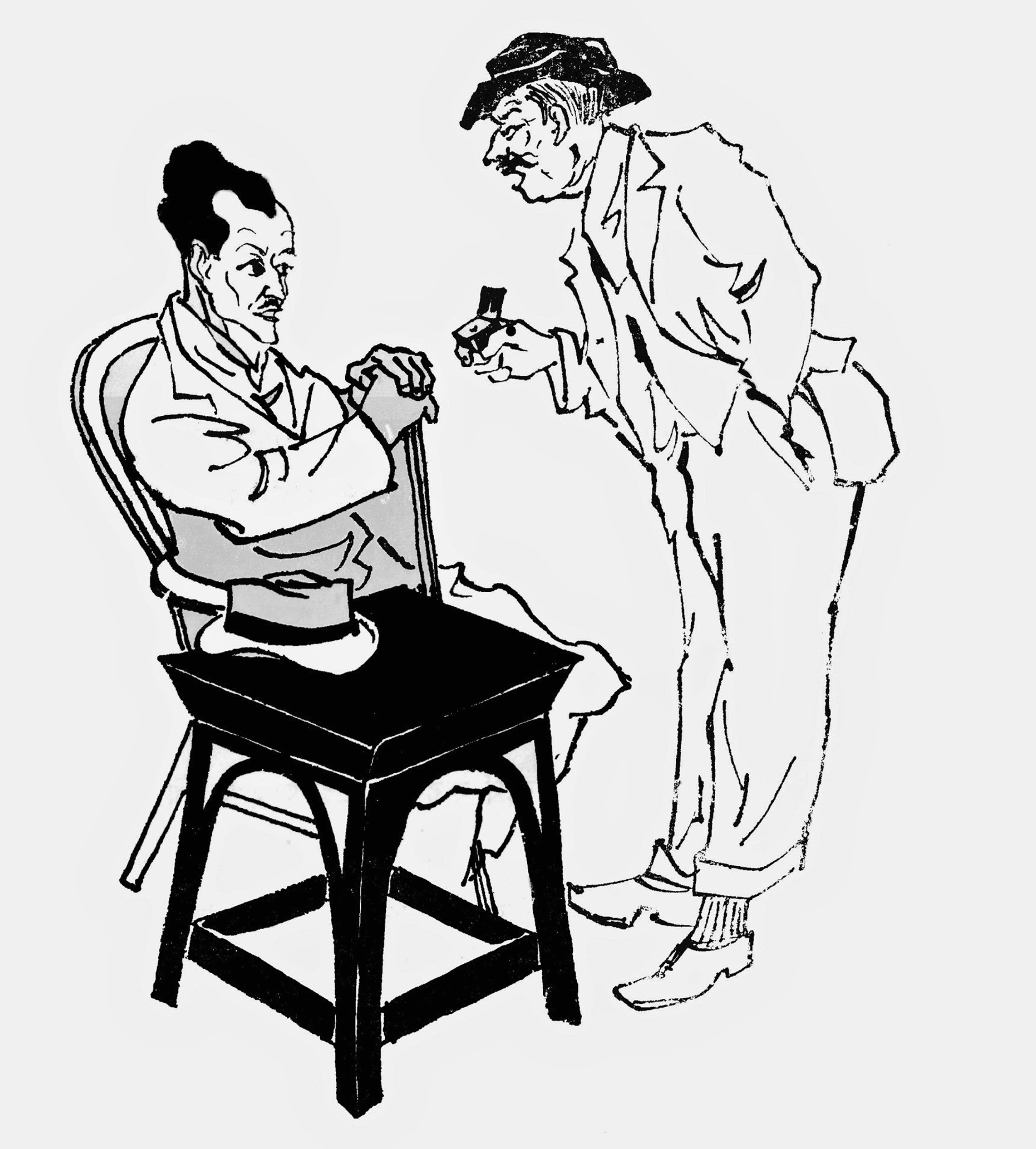
- Illustration by Ajit Gupta in 1956
- Author: Premendra Mitra
- Original title: পোকা
- Illustrator: Ajit Gupta
- Language: Bengali
- Series: GhanaDa
- Genre: Science fiction
- Publisher: Deb Sahitya Kutir
- Publication date: 1948
- Publication place: India
- Media type: Print
- Preceded by: ঘড়ি (The Clock)
- Followed by: মাছ (The Fish)

Poka (Bengali: পোকা) (transl. The Insect) is a work of science fiction written in Bengali by novelist Premendra Mitra. The story was first published by Deb Sahitya Kutir, Kolkata, West Bengal, India, in the Puja Annual titled Abahon (Bengali: আবাহন) in 1948. It was the forth story in Ghanada series, the first one being মশা (The Mosquito) published in 1945. Ghanashyam Das, alias Ghanada, the protagonist of the Ghanada series of science-fiction novels written in Bengali is a fictional character created by Premendra Mitra.

== Characterization ==
The character of Ghanashyam Das (alias Ghanada) was described as a bachelor, a dark-complexioned male with a tall and skeletal figure, aged "anywhere between thirty five to fifty five", as described by the author himself in Mosha, the first story of the Ghanada series. He stayed in the third-floor attic of a shared apartment (মেস বাড়ি) at no. 72, Banamali Naskar Lane, Calcutta, West Bengal, India, along with other boarders, who called him Ghanada. The term "da" is a suffix added to the name of an elder male in Bengal to convey reverence and affection. Though he was rarely found engaged in any activity or work other than telling fantastic tales to the boarders of the apartment, his stories involved him in most of the major world events of the last two hundred years, and described his travels throughout the entire world.

গত দুশো বছর ধরে পৃথিবীর হেন জায়গা নেই যেখানে তিনি যাননি, হেন ঘটনা ঘটেনি যার সঙ্গে তাঁর কোনও যোগ নেই

Premendra Mitra, the creator, described Ghanada in an interview by A K Ganguly published in SPAN in 1974, as under:

Ghanada is a teller of tall tales, but the tales always have a scientific basis. I try to keep them as factually correct and as authentic as possible.

== The Characters ==
In order of appearance

- Ghanashyam Das alias Ghanada
- Shibu
- Gour
- Shishir
- Author (anonymous in this story. However, now we know it was Sudhir)
- General Vornof, alias Isaac Rothstein, brother of Jacob Rothstein
- Jacob Rothstein, the scientist

== The Plot ==
It was a Saturday night. The boarders of the boarding house at No. 72 Banamali Naskar Lane went to sleep a little late after partying. At around midnight they were awoken by a blood-curdling scream coming out of Ghanada's third floor attic room, followed by him recklessly running down the stairs. They enquired what had transpired. GhanaDa halted for a second to compose himself, and breathlessly uttered, "What happened? Just what I thought".

আমরা সবাই এখনও জেগে আছি, ঘনাদা বোধহয় ভাবেননি। আমাদের সকলের উৎকণ্ঠিত প্রশ্নের সামনে প্রথমটা একমুহূর্তের জন্য তিনি কেমন যেন একটু অপ্রস্তুত হয়ে পড়লেন. কিন্তু সে বোধহয় আমাদের মনের ভুল। পরের মুহূর্তেই আমাদের সকলকে একেবারে স্তম্ভিত করে দিয়ে তিনি চাপা গলায় বললেন, "ব্যাপার? ব্যাপার যা ভেবেছিলাম, তা-ই।"

Upon careful inspection, they found that the cause was an insect. While everyone started laughing, Ghanada remained indifferent and asked gravely, "Did you ever have to run after an insect for eight thousand miles? Did you ever have to storm your brain thinking what you would do with three thousand tons of dead insect? Did you ever happen to carry out a desperate search for an insect in the deadliest forests of Africa with a paper and a closed phial?" "Was it this insect, Ghanada?" "No, that was Schistocerca gregaria." Ghanada continued, "It was the 22nd December of 1931. The Riga of Latvia was covered under heavy snow, when I was returning from my morning walk…" and the story continues. At the end it was revealed how Ghanada reached the basin of the river Bahr al-Arab in Sudan, Africa, in the land of Dinkas, in search of the mad scientist Jacob Rothstein. He then used a contagious biological agent to eradicate the swarm of deadly African desert locust weighing three thousand tons, and yet again averted an impending disaster."
