= Pinpre Puran =

Indian novel

Pinpre Puran (Bengali: পিঁপড়ে পুরাণ Piprey Puran) is a short novel of science fiction by Bengali writer Premendra Mitra in 1938, intended mainly for preteens. Its subject is giant ants that conquer humankind in the future.

== Background ==
After the demise of Chittaranjan Dash [দেশবন্ধু চিত্তরঞ্জন দাশ], during 1925-26 a communal riot took place in Calcutta. Mitra then shifted to his birthplace Varanasi, where he met two brothers from Calcutta, Manaranjan Bhattacharya [মনোরঞ্জন ভট্টাচার্য] & Khshitindra Narayan Bhattacharya [ক্ষিতীন্দ্রনারায়ণ ভট্টাচার্য]. These three planned to write various interesting children literature based on science. Mitra wrote a small novel and nearly after three years, it was published in Ramdhonu [রামধনু] (The Rainbow) (a magazine for children edited by Manaranjan Bhattacharya). Later, this novel was printed from D. M. Library as a book with the name: Pinpre Puran. Besides this novel, he also wrote many other novels and stories, such as: Kuhoker Deshe [কুহকের দেশে], Prithibeer Shatru [পৃথিবীর শত্রু], Kalapanir Atole [কালাপানির অতলে], etc. and the GhanaDa series, all of which cover a wide range of science fiction.

== Plot ==
The novel is about a future world. At present time of the novel, the world is overrun with Ants. They are six feet tall, intelligent and organised. While humans were busy fighting within themselves, the Ants had begun their preparations to take over the planet. They had emerged from their hideouts in the Andes Mountain and had begun their major assault in 7757 and from then, they are defeating the humans in battles. In that year, all of the main cities on the western side of longitude 70° West of South America ruined in a single day by an under-earth attack. One by one the cities of Peru, Venezuela and Ecuador came down like blocks of cards. The only man who escaped this attack unscathed was Don Perito [ডন পেরিটো], who escaped to Mexico. He was the first human to describe the destruction wrought by the Ants. Within a few years, the Ants had taken over the entire South America. The weapon of mass destruction that they used was a suicide bomb. They also used advanced technological weapons, for example, the Ants used a kind of searching, powerful light, somewhat green in colour that took away human sight in an instant. This story of the battle is broken into small sub-sections with first-person narrations. The first narrator is the storyteller who begins the story. Soon it is turned to the diary of Ashesh Roy [অশেষ রায়], an explorer who had first seen the Ants in 6757. The third narration is by Senor Sabatini [সেনর সাবাতিনি], a famous writer of Rio de Janeiro who describes the third deadly attack. The fourth and final narration is by Sukhomoy Sarkar [সুখময় সরকার], a Bengali who was imprisoned by the Ants and after five years, he somehow escaped. He gives the most comprehensive details of the social and economic organization of them. The description by Sukhomoy Sarkar of the society of Ants is like this: The Ants live in a democracy. The intelligent Ants provide suggestions on science and technology to those Ants who conduct the administration. They are highly advanced compared to humans in knowledge and social structures, and have a strict sense of justice. Mitra concludes this novel with declaration that the whole mankind is united, forgetting their internal enmity, to fight their common enemy.

== Review ==
As observed by Debjani Sengupta in her essay Sadhanbabu's Friends: Science Fiction in Bengal from 1882-1961: "...Mitra hints at a time when the very existence of humans will be endangered, when common flowers and trees will be a thing of the past."

== See also ==
- Ghanada
- Bengali science fiction
