= Diagourou =

Diagourou may refer to:

- Diagourou, Burkina Faso, a town in Coalla Department, Gnagna Province, Burkina Faso
- Diagourou, Niger, a village and rural commune in Niger
