= Ghari (story) =

1948 GhanaDa story by Premendra Mitra

Ghari (The Clock)
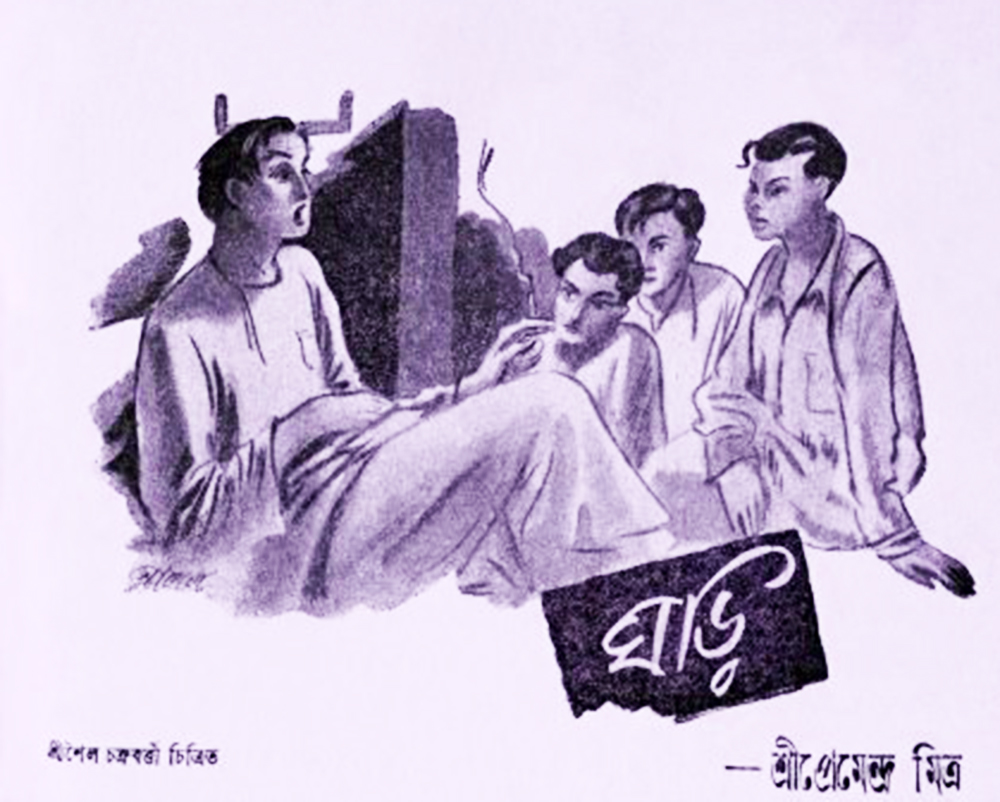
- Illustration by Shaila Chakraborty in 1948
- Author: Premendra Mitra
- Original title: ঘড়ি
- Illustrator: Shaila Chakraborty
- Language: Bengali
- Series: GhanaDa
- Genre: Science fiction
- Publisher: Sarat Sahitya Bhaban
- Publication date: 1948
- Publication place: India
- Media type: Puja annual
- Preceded by: নুড়ি (The Pebble)
- Followed by: পোকা (The Insect)

Ghari (Bengali: ঘড়ি) (transl. The Clock) is a work of science fiction written in Bengali by the novelist Premendra Mitra. This story was first published in Chhayapoth (Bengali: ছায়াপথ), the Puja annual of Sarat Sahityo Bhaban, Kolkata, West Bengal, India, in 1948. It was the third story in GhanaDa series portraying Ghanashyam Das alias GhanaDa, the fictional character created by Premendra Mitra, and the protagonist of the GhanaDa series of science-fiction novels.

== Characterization ==
The character of Ghanashyam Das alias Ghanada was outlined as a bachelor, dark complexioned male with tall, boney and skeletal structure, and having age “anywhere between thirty five to fifty five”. It was described by the author in Mosha, the first story of the Ghanada series. He stayed in the third floor attic of a shared apartment (মেস বাড়ি) at no. 72, Banamali Naskar Lane, Calcutta along with other boarders, who fondly called him Ghana-da. The term “da” is a suffix added to the name of an elder male in Bengal to convey reverence and affection.

Ghanada was rarely found to be engaging in any activity or work other than telling fantastic tales to the boarders of the apartment. His stories were relevant to most of the major events that happened in the world for the last two hundred years (18th and 19th century) and there was no place on earth which he did not visit. This is the reason why Ghanada pretended to not know of his age as it can expose him.

গত দুশো বছর ধরে পৃথিবীর হেন জায়গা নেই যেখানে তিনি যাননি, হেন ঘটনা ঘটেনি যার সঙ্গে তাঁর কোনও যোগ নেই

Premendra Mitra, the creator, described Ghana~da in an interview by A K Ganguly published in SPAN in 1974, as under:

Ghana~da is a teller of tall tales, but the tales always have a scientific basis. I try to keep them as factually correct and as authentic as possible.

== Plot ==
Samoan Islands
Native name: Motu o Sāmoa
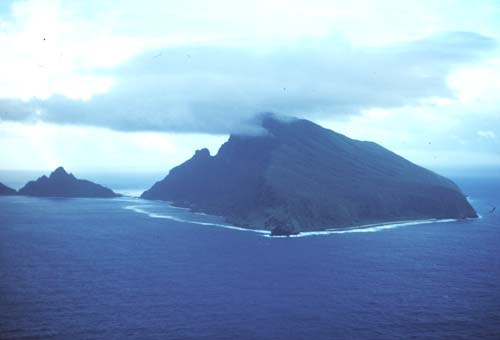
- Above: Olosega island in the Manu'a group, eastern Samoa Islands. Below: map of the Samoan Islands

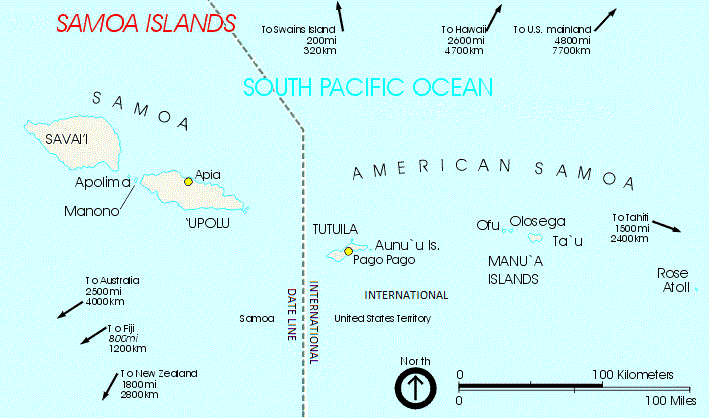

Geography
- Location: Polynesia
- Area: 3,030 km^{2} (1,170 sq mi)
- Highest elevation: 1,858 m (6096 ft)
- Highest point: Mauga Silisili

Administration
- Samoa
- Largest settlement: Apia (pop. 38,800)
- American Samoa
- Largest settlement: Tafuna (pop. 9,756)

Demographics
- Population: 249,839 (2012)

It was a day of Derby, ie, there was a scheduled football (soccer) match between two big clubs of West Bengal, East Bengal and Mohan Bagan. The four close friends, Shibu, Gaur, Shishir and Sudhir with the author, who were boarders of the shared apartment at no. 72 Banamali Naskar Lane, were getting prepared to leave for the football stadium while keeping a keen watch on the time. Sudhir gave his clock to Gaur and said, “Keep it with yourself. You won't need asking the time repeatedly then.” Here entered GhanaDa, with a warning that clocks should not be accepted without a proper check. It could be disastrous.

Getting inquisitive Shibu mentioned that GhanaDa was never seen having a clock. GhanaDa replied, “No, I do not have a clock, but once I received some.” “Received? How many, GhanaDa?” “As far as I remember”, GhanaDa replied indifferently, “Two lakh fifty three thousand three hundred and one only.”

শিবু তা সত্বেও জিজ্ঞাসা করেছে, "সে-সব ঘড়ি গেল কোথায় ঘনাদা? কোথায় রেখেছেন মনে নেই বুঝি?"
"না, মনে থাকবে না কেন, খুব মনে আছে I সেগুলো রেখেছিলাম ১২৫ ডিগ্রী দ্রাঘিমা যেখানে ৩৫ ডিগ্রী অক্ষ্যাংশকে কেটে বেরিয়ে গেছে ঠিক সেইখানেই, তবে সেগুলো এখন অচল"

GhanaDa reminded of a massive Tsunami and cyclone occurred in the South Pacific Ocean on 17 September 1937. His story preceded the event by two months. At that time he was visiting an area covering from Hawaii to Fiji through Samoa, carrying out an import-export business which was a cover hiding his actual identity. All of a sudden he received two telegrams from Neville and Frank on the same day, requesting him to undertake a secret service mission and to meet the sender at the earliest. They were understood to be Neville Chamberlain, Prime Minister of the United Kingdom, and Franklin Roosevelt, President of the United States. “Were they your friends, GhanaDa?”, asked Shibu.

যেন অত্যন্ত সামান্য ব্যাপার, এইভাবে কথাটা হাত নেড়ে উড়িয়ে দিয়ে ঘনাদা বলেছেন, "যাক সে সব কথা"

The author, Premendra Mitra, addressed the issue of international terrorism in this story. Some agencies in Asia distributed cheap clock attached with explosives and timer, that were distributed throughout Europe and the United States. Most of these clocks were programmed to explode at a particular time and date to destroy major infrastructure of these countries. With timely intervention of GhanaDa, a major impending world disaster was averted. However, the crucial Eastbengal club versus Mohanbagan club football match was eventually missed by all.

== Characters ==
- Ghanashyam Das alias Ghanada
- Gouranga alias Gour
- Shibu
- Shishir
- Author (anonymous in this story. However, now we know it is Sudhir)
- Mr. Okamoto, representative of the Clock manufacturing Company
- Mr. Leyman, Police Chief of Samoa Island
