= Nuri (story) =

1947 Ghanada story by Premendra Mitra

Nuri (The Pebble)
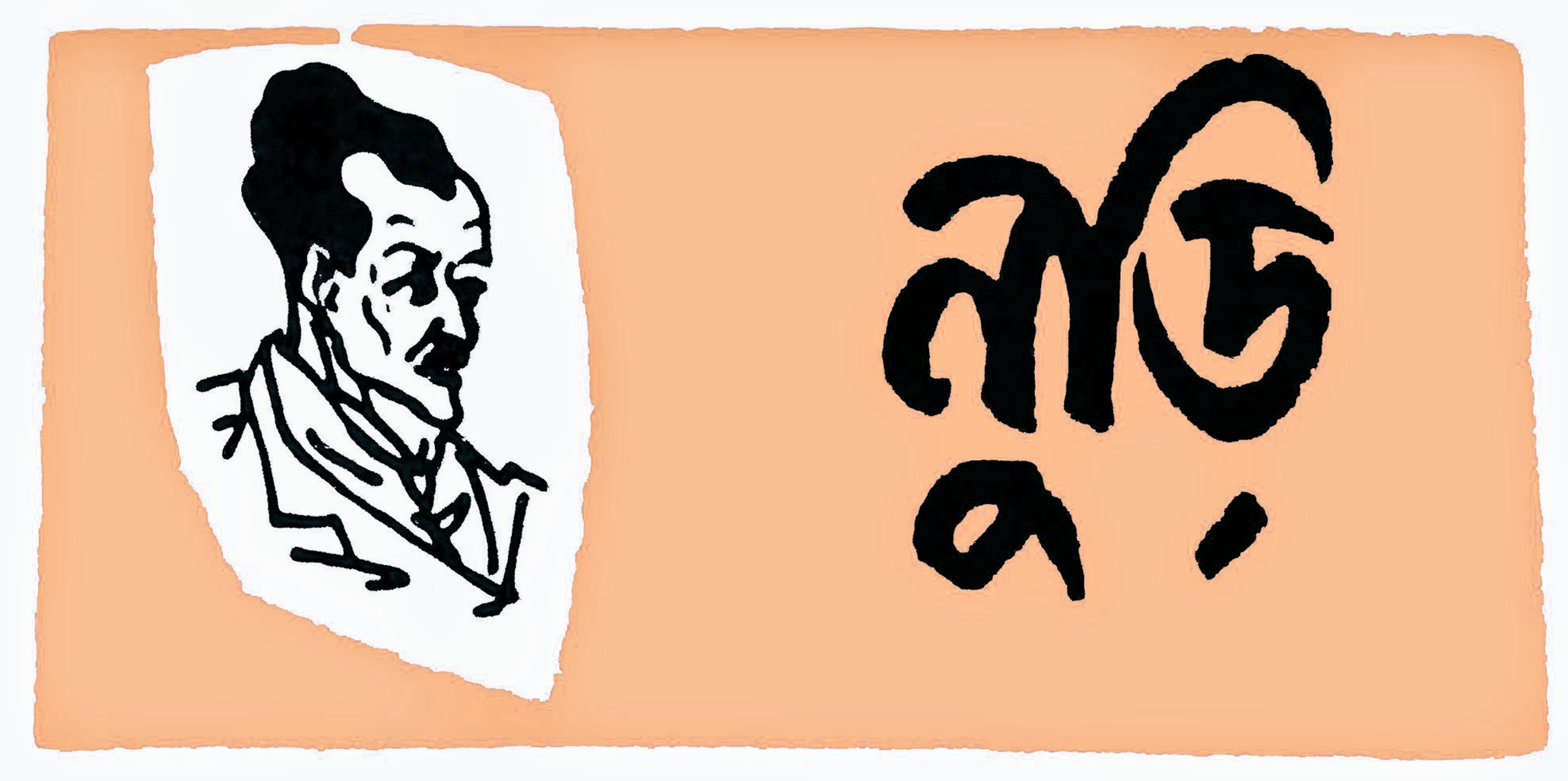
- Illustration by Ajit Gupta in 1968
- Author: Premendra Mitra
- Original title: নুড়ি
- Illustrator: Ajit Gupta
- Language: Bengali
- Series: GhanaDa
- Genre: Science fiction
- Publisher: Deb Sahitya Kutir
- Publication date: 1947
- Publication place: India
- Media type: Print
- Preceded by: মশা (The Mosquito)
- Followed by: ঘড়ি (The Clock)

Nuri (Bengali: নুড়ি) (transl. The Pebble) is a work of science fiction written in Bengali by the Bengali novelist Premendra Mitra. This story was first published by Deb Sahitya Kutir, Kolkata, West Bengal, India, in the Puja Annual titled Rangarakhi (Bengali: রাঙারাখি) in 1947. It was the second story in GhanaDa series, the first one being মশা (the mosquito) published in 1945. Ghanashyam Das, alias Ghanada, the protagonist of the Ghanada series of science-fiction novels written in Bengali is a fictional character created by Premendra Mitra.

== Characterization ==
The character of Ghanashyam Das alias Ghanada was outlined as a bachelor, dark complexioned male with tall, boney and skeletal structure, having age "anywhere between thirty five to fifty five", as described by the author himself in Mosha, the first story of the Ghanada series. He stayed in the third floor attic of a shared apartment (মেস বাড়ি) at no. 72, Banamali Naskar Lane, Calcutta, West Bengal, India, along with other boarders, who called him Ghana-da, while the term "da" is a suffix added to the name of an elder male in Bengal to convey reverence and affection. Though he was rarely found engaged in any activity or work other than telling fantastic tales to the boarders of the apartment, his stories engaged him with most of the major events happened in the world for last two hundred years and there was no place on earth which he didn't visit.

গত দুশো বছর ধরে পৃথিবীর হেন জায়গা নেই যেখানে তিনি যাননি, হেন ঘটনা ঘটেনি যার সঙ্গে তাঁর কোনও যোগ নেই

Premendra Mitra, the creator, described Ghana~da in an interview by A K Ganguly published in SPAN in 1974, as under:

Ghana~da is a teller of tall tales, but the tales always have a scientific basis. I try to keep them as factually correct and as authentic as possible.

== Characters ==
- Ghanashyam Das alias Ghanada
- Ram (appeared in this story only)
- Shibu
- Gouranga alias Gour
- Author (anonymous in this story. However, now we know it is Sudhir)
- Malana, the house owner in Port Vila
- Monsieur Petra, an explorer

== Plot ==
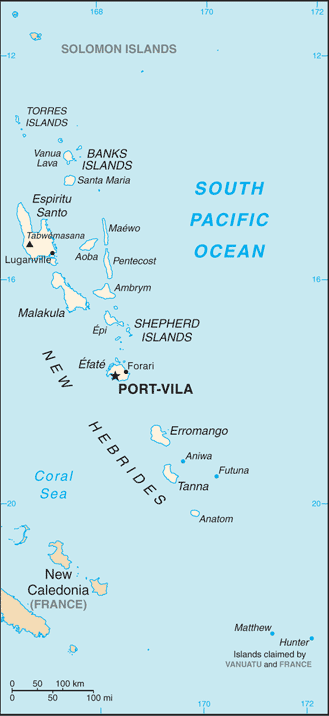
An enlargeable map of the Republic of Vanuatu

It was a rainy day in 1947. The city of Calcutta had almost become Venice. Most of the streets were waterlogged, and almost no public transport available. All boarders of the boarding house at 72 Banamali Naskar Lane were detained for day long and desperately trying to pass time, expecting GhanaDa to initiate his tall tales. Unfortunately, GhanaDa was not in a mood to talk that day and his only activity was to yawn like a roaring lion. It was a complete failure in instigating GhanaDa to open his mouth, and after trying hard for a long time discussing various topics, Ram directly charged him saying, ”GhanaDa, didn’t you do weight lifting ever?”

"ওয়েট-লিফটিং!" ঘনাদা নেহাত আলস্য ভরে বলেছেন, "না, ওয়েট-লিফটিং করিনি – তবে একবার একটা পাথর তুলেছিলাম"
(With reluctance he replied, "No, I didn’t do weightlifting, but once pickeed up a pebble".)

There the story began.

The story was based on Efata, the capital of New Hebrides, presently known as the Vanuatu. GhanaDa was there apparently in connection with his business of Sandalwood, and was stationed in the small Island of Aneghowhat (Bengali: আনিওয়া) in the south of Port Villa. He met Monsieur Petra, a French man explorer. Six years later he again met Petra in an uninhabited island about ten miles away from Aneghowhat. On the top of a mysterious hill about two thousand feet high there was a mysterious lake high above the sea level. M. Petra was stationed in a cave and along with him GhanaDa dived into the depth of the lake only to find an abundance of diamond embedded in the belts of bluish Kimberlite under the water of the lake. GhanaDa couldn't resist himself from lifting one large piece of Diamond, and BOOM! the island blew up.

When Shibu asked, "Where is that diamond now, GhanaDa?”, GhanaDa was unmindful. Apparently he couldn't hear and didn't reply.

== Scientific references ==
The Vanuatu archipelago in the South Pacific is the host of some of the most spectacular volcanoes, such as Ambae, Ambrym, Lopevi, and Yasur. There are a few active or erupting volcanos as well as many dormant and extinct volcanoes too. The author, Premendra Mitra, extensively studied the geology, anthropology and ornithology of the area and explained vividly in simple words and explicit details the possibilities of getting diamonds in kimberlite pipes formed in volcanic activities. The story appears to have every minute details of a volcanic explosion as to be accpted as a real life experience, had the readers not knowing the characterization of GhanaDa.

A first hand report of mysterious volcanic activities ware published in The Sydney Morning Herald dated Wednesday, 4 September 1901, which was observed by the French steamer Pacifique. This geographic area experienced similar activities since long and this story perfectly placed GhanaDa into the plot.

The first shocks appear to have occurred in the night of the 8th of last month, and they increased until they became so violent that the white inhabitants fled from their dwellings and the natives hid themselves in the bush. The shocks were very severe on Ambrym, Pentecost, and Espritu Santo. So far as could be learnt no loss of life had taken place, but on the coast stations dwellings were shaken to pieces. The earthquake was due to an eruption of a volcano near Epi. Describing that outburst, a passenger by the steamer La Perouse said : " Immense vomiting jets of smoke and flame went skyward. The spectacle as viewed from the deck of the La Perouse was impressively grand. " The eruption was followed by a tidal wave, which did infinitely greater damage to the plantations than the eruption.
