= Boula =

Boula may refer to:

- Boula (music), any of several Caribbean drums
- Boula, Guinea, a town in the Kankan region
- Boula, Burkina Faso, a village in Gnagna Province
- Boula (writer) (died 1984), also known as Ikbal El Alaily, an Egyptian surrealist writer
