= Bani, Gnagna =

Bani
- Location in Burkina Faso
- Coordinates: 13°19′09″N 0°05′58″W
- Country: Burkina Faso
- Region: Est Region
- Province: Gnagna Province
- Department: Coalla Department

Population (2019)
  - Total: 2,166

Bani is a village in the Coalla Department of Gnagna Province in eastern Burkina Faso.

== Geography ==
Bani, an agro-pastoral locality scattered among several residential centers, is about 10 km southeast of Coalla.

Population
Year	Pop.	±%
1985	889	—
2006	753	−15.3%
2019	2,166	+187.6%
