= Parashor Barma =

- Parashor character
- First appearance: Goyenda Kobi Parashor (1932)
- Last appearance: Ghanada O Dui Doshor Mamababu O Parashar(1989)
- Created by: Premendra Mitra
- Friend(s): Krittibas Bhadra

In-universe information
- Nickname: Parashor
- Gender: Male
- Title: Barma
- Occupation: Detective, Poet
- Religion: Hindu
- Nationality: Indian

Parashor Barma is a fictional detective character made by Bengali writer Premendra Mitra. First Parashor story is Goyenda Kobi Parashor (Parashor, the Poet-Detective) and was published in 1932.

== Character ==
Although Parashor is a detective, his passion is poetry. Parashor never identifies himself as an investigator. The narrator of Parashor stories, Krittibas Bhadra, the editor of a magazine, is the friend of Parashor. According to Krittibas, Parashar is moody, jovial, little eccentric and a horrible poet, but a true genius. Although his actions seem capricious and pointless to the reader (and even to Krittibas who often feels disgusted with his genius friend's caprices) at the beginning, he comes up with an unexpected solution at the end of each mystery. He can even solve a serious mystery while reading out his nonsense poems.

== Books and stories ==
Premendra Mitra wrote a good number of Detective fictions of Parashor Barma, some of are:

- Goyenda Kobi Parashor (Detective-Poet Parashor)
- Hippie Songe Parashor Barma (Parashor Barma in Hippie Company)
- Cluber naam kumati (The Club named Kumati)
- Nilem daklo parashor Barma (Parashor Called an Auction)
- Premer Chokhe Parashor (Parashor in the Eye of Love)
- Haar manlen Parashor Barma
- Parashor Barma O Bhanga Radio (Parashor Barma and the Broken Radio)
- Parashor Barma O Ashlil Boi (Parashor Barma and a Obscene Book)
- Parashor Ebar Johuri (Parashor the Jeweler)
- Anke kancha Parashor Barma(Parashor Barma's math is poor)
- Wrong number

Two GhanaDa tales also include Parashar Barma :

- Parasharey Ghanaday
- Ghanada Phirlen
- Ghanada O Dui Doshor Mamababu O Parashar(1989)

=== Anthology ===
- Parashor Samagra
