= Santiari =

- Interactive map of Santiari
- Country: Burkina Faso
- Region: Est Region
- Province: Gnagna Province
- Department: Coalla Department

Population (2019 est.)
  - Total: 2,643

Santiari is a village in the Coalla Department of Gnagna Province in eastern Burkina Faso.

== Geography ==
Santiari, an agropastoral locality scattered among several residential centers, is about 10 km southwest of Coalla.

Population
Year	Pop.	±%
1985	604	—
2006	990	+63.9%
2019 (est.)	2,643	+167.0%

== Health and education ==
The nearest health center to Santiari is the Health and Social Promotion Center (HSPC) in Coalla.
