= Tankori =

- Location in Burkina Faso
- Coordinates: 13°27′N 0°10′W
- Country: Burkina Faso
- Region: Est Region
- Province: Gnagna Province
- Department: Coalla Department

Population (2019)
  - Total: 778

Tankori is a village in the Coalla Department of Gnagna Province in eastern Burkina Faso.

== Geography ==
Tankori is 5 km northwest of Coalla – and 20 km from Highway 18 – on the left bank of the Faga River.

Population
Year	Pop.	±%
2006	491	—
2019	778	+58.5%

== Health and education ==
The nearest health center in Tankori is the Health and Social Promotion Center (HSPC) in Coalla.
