= Bambrigoani =

Coordinates: 13.40133°N 0.14954°W

Bambrigoani Bambagouabri
- Interactive map of Bambrigoani
- Country: Burkina Faso
- Region: Est Region
- Province: Gnagna Province
- Department: Coalla Department

Population (2019)
  - Total: 542

Bambrigoani is a village in the Coalla Department of Gnagna Province in eastern Burkina Faso.

Population
Year	Pop.	±%
1985	261	—
2006	379	+45.2%
2019	542	+43.0%

== Health and education ==
The nearest health center in Bambrigoani is the Health and Social Promotion Centre (CSPS) in Coalla.
