= Doyana, Coalla =

Doyana Dayana
- Location in Burkina Faso
- Coordinates: 13°23′N 0°0′E
- Country: Burkina Faso
- Region: Est Region
- Province: Gnagna Province
- Department: Coalla Department

Population (2019)
  - Total: 1,207

Doyana is a town in the Coalla Department of Gnagna Province in eastern Burkina Faso.

== Geography ==
Doyana is 4 km southwest of Coalla – and 15 km northeast of National Highway 18 – on the other side of the Faga.

Population
| Year | Pop. | ±% |
|---|---|---|
| 1985 | 669 | — |
| 2006 | 1,036 | +54.9% |
| 2019 | 1,207 | +16.5% |

== Health and education ==
The nearest health center in Doyana is the Neiba Health and Social Promotion Center (HSPC).
