= Takou, Burkina Faso =

Takou
- Interactive map of Takou
- Coordinates: 13°25′45″N 0°09′19″W
- Country: Burkina Faso
- Region: Est Region
- Province: Gnagna Province
- Department: Coalla Department

Population (2019)
  - Total: 776

Takou is a village in the Coalla Department of Gnagna Province in eastern Burkina Faso.

== Geography ==
Takou is located 3 km northwest of Coalla on the left bank of the Faga.

Population
Year	Pop.	±%
2006	459	—
2019	776	+69.1%

== Health and education ==
The nearest health center in Takou is the Health and Social Promotion Center (CSPS) in Neiba.
