= Tihandéni =

- Interactive map of Tihandéni
- Country: Burkina Faso
- Region: Est Region
- Province: Gnagna Province
- Department: Coalla Department

Population (2019)
  - Total: 1,635

Tihandéni is a village in the Coalla Department of Gnagna Province in eastern Burkina Faso.

== Geography ==
Tihandéni – which is an agro-pastoral locality dispersed in several residential centers – is located 5 km northeast of Coalla.

Population
Year	Pop.	±%
2006	899	—
2019	1,635	+81.9%

== Health and education ==
The closest health center to Tihandéni is the Coalla health and social promotion center (CSPS).
