= Yassougou =

- Interactive map of Yassougou
- Country: Burkina Faso
- Region: Est Region
- Province: Gnagna Province
- Department: Coalla Department

Population (2019)
  - Total: 633

Yassougou is a village in the Coalla Department of Gnagna Province in eastern Burkina Faso.

== Geography ==
Yassougou – which is an agro-pastoral locality dispersed in several residential centers located on the left bank of the Faga River – is located approximately 10 km southeast of Coalla.

Population
Year	Pop.	±%
2006	651	—
2019	633	−2.8%

== Health and education ==
The closest health center to Yassougou is the Coalla health and social promotion center (CSPS).
