= Thiongori =

- Interactive map of Thiongori
- Country: Burkina Faso
- Region: Est Region
- Province: Gnagna Province
- Department: Coalla Department

Population (2019)
  - Total: 1,041

Thiongori is a village in the Coalla Department of Gnagna Province in eastern Burkina Faso.

== Geography ==
Thiongori is located 8 km southeast of Coalla on the left bank of the Faga.

Population
Year	Pop.	±%
2006	526	—
2019	1,041	+97.9%

== Health and education ==
The closest health center to Thiongori is the Neiba health and social promotion center (CSPS).
