= Ghanada Samagra 3 =

Ghanada Samagra 3 (or, Ghanada Somogro 3) (ঘনাদা সমগ্র ৩) is a collection of Ghanada stories & novel. Written by Premendra Mitra in Bengali, this book is published by Ananda Publishers, Kolkata. This book was previously named as Ghanada Tosyo Tosyo Omnibus (ঘনাদা তস্য তস্য অমনিবাস). It was released in 2014.

== Overview ==
Premendra Mitra wrote in the preface of Ghanada Tosyo Tosyo Omnibus:

…Where truth is stranger than imagination and impossible to believe, to obtain the living description of the astonishing chapters of the World; this time I return to ‘’Tosyo Tosyo’’, that is, to some ancestors of Ghanada (…সত্য যেখানে কল্পনার চেয়েও বিস্ময়কর ও বিশ্বাসের অতীত, পৃথিবীর ইতিহাসের সেইসব আশ্চর্য অধ্যায়ের জীবন্ত পরিচয় পাবার জন্য এবারে ফিরে গেলাম 'তস্য তস্য' অর্থাৎ ঘনাদারই নানা ঊর্ধ্বতন পূর্বপুরুষদেরই কাছে।).

Thus, in his own words, this books is about Ghanada's ancestors.

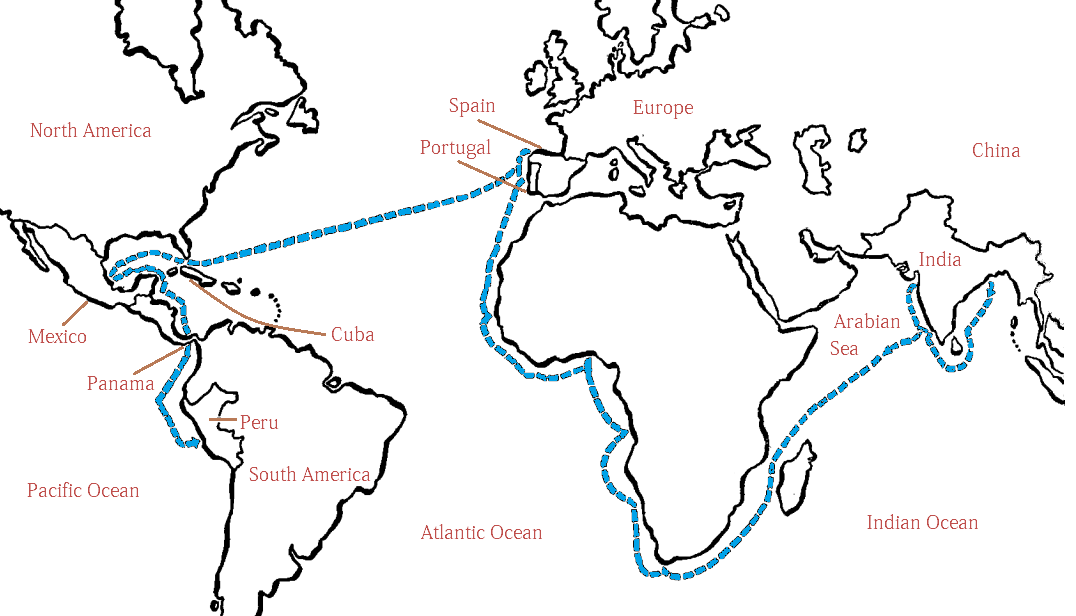
Journey of Ghanada's ancestors

Most of the Ghanada stories takes place at the mess at 72 Banamali Naskar Lane with the four young members of the mess Shibu [শিবু], Shishir, Gour and Sudhir; as in Ghanada Samagra 1 & Ghanada Samagra 2, but all the tales of this book features a new set of audiences and also a new place. Here, 5 elderly gentlemen gather together on the southern side of a big, man-made lake in Kolkata and sit alongside a tree regularly in the afternoon. They are, at the first time, introduced with some adjectives indicating their physical characteristics:

1. Head as white as a kash flower- HarisadhanBabu [শিরশোভা কাশের মত শুভ্র- হরিসাধনবাবু].
2. Head as smooth as a stone- ShibapadaBabu [মস্তক মর্মরের মত মসৃণ- শিবপদবাবু]: A retired teacher of history. He generally throws challenge to Ghanada.
3. Belly like a barrel- RamsharanBabu [উদর কুম্ভের মত স্ফীত- রামশরণবাবু].
4. Body-weight like an elephant- BhabataranBabu [মেদভারে হস্তির মত বিপুল- ভবতারনবাবু]: A retired government serviceman. Now-a-days, reads books on story, novel, religion etc. Generally he remains silent in this assembling.
5. Thin like a camel and out of order- GhanashyamBabu- [উস্ট্রের মত শীর্ণ ও সামঞ্জস্যহীন- ঘনশ্যামবাবু]: Ghanada himself.

The suffix Babu in Bengali refers to an honorary gentleman, a substitution to Mr. in English. The author's style and approach loses the casual sense and gains a more polished, serious and sarcastically formal aura. As mentioned earlier, Ghanada is not the hero in these tales; rather he describes how his great ancestors changed the course of history. They are shown to influence highly important historical events at different times all over the globe. These tales contain heroines and a few love-relationships, which are generally missing in the tales he tells at the mess.

== Contents ==
Mitra had to study a lot to write these 3 short-stories and 1 novel that are included in this book:

- 1.Das Holen Ghanada [দাস হলেন ঘনাদা] (Ghanada Becomes Das) - Ghanada explains how Ganado [গানাদো], his 22nd ancestor, became a slave, and how he was freed. Ghanada claims that Ganado was actually the inventor of tank; named Manta to deploy it in 1520 (the first universally accepted use of tank is on 15 September 1916 during First World War). The novel starts in 1502, when Vasco da Gama came to India for the second time. Once he destroyed a business-ship, where a boy was saved luckily. Travelling Lisbon & Cuba, he was sold as a slave to a Spanish family: Juarez [জুয়ারেজ]. This boy later grows up and he is the great Ganado.
- 2.Surya Kandle Sona [সূর্য কাঁদলে সোনা] (Golden Tears of the Sun)- A huge novel concerning unbelievable experiences of Ganado in South America. The fall of the Inca Empire is described here.
- 3.Agra Jokhon Tolmol [আগ্রা যখন টলমল] (While Agra Was Trembling)- A short novel of Bachanram Das [বচনরাম দাস] at Medieval India. It contains a breathtaking account of Shivaji's remarkable escape from Agra.
- 4.Robinson Crusoe Meye Chhilen [রবিনসন ক্রুশো মেয়ে ছিলেন] (Robinson Crusoe Was a Lady)- A story of Nan Su [নান সু], a princess of China, which Ghanada describes to be the authentic source of the famous Daniel Defoe novel Robinson Crusoe. But, no reference to Ghanada or his ancestors is found.
