= Boudabga =

- Interactive map of Boudabga
- Country: Burkina Faso
- Region: Est Region
- Province: Gnagna Province
- Department: Coalla Department

Population (2019)
  - Total: 1,690

Boudabga is a town in the Coalla Department of Gnagna Province in eastern Burkina Faso.

== Geography ==
Boudabga – which is an agropastoral locality scattered in several residential centers located on the right bank of the Faga River – is located approximately 10 km southeast of Coalla.

Population
Year	Pop.	±%
2006	1,190	—
2019	1,690	+42.0%

== Health and education ==
The closest health center to Boudabga is the Coalla health and social promotion center (HSPC).
