= Bampouringa =

- Interactive map of Bampouringa
- Coordinates: 13.50306°N 0.14889°W
- Country: Burkina Faso
- Region: Est Region
- Province: Gnagna Province
- Department: Coalla Department

Population (2019)
  - Total: 2,823

Bampouringa or Bampouriga is a town in the Coalla Department of Gnagna Province in eastern Burkina Faso.

== Geography ==
Bampouringa is about 10 km north of Coalla.

== Health and education ==
The nearest health center in Bampouringa is the Bonsiega Health and Social Promotion Centre (HSPC).

Population
Year	Pop.	±%
2006	1,503	—
2019	2,823	+87.8%
