= Kontiandi =

- Interactive map of Kontiandi
- Country: Burkina Faso
- Region: Est Region
- Province: Gnagna Province
- Department: Coalla Department

Population (2019 est.)
  - Total: 3,030

Kontiandi is a village in the Coalla Department of Gnagna Province in eastern Burkina Faso.

== Geography ==
Kontiandi is 15 km east of Coalla.

Population
Year	Pop.	±%
1985	750	—
2006	1,135	+51.3%
2019 (est.)	3,030	+167.0%

== Health and education ==
The nearest health center in Kontiandi is the Health and Social Promotion Center (CSPS) in Coalla.
