= Goundou =

- Location in Burkina Faso
- Coordinates: 13°29′N 0°0′E
- Country: Burkina Faso
- Region: Est Region
- Province: Gnagna Province
- Department: Coalla Department

Population (2019)
  - Total: 842

Goundou is a village in the Coalla Department of Gnagna Province in eastern Burkina Faso.

== Geography ==
Goundou is a scattered agropastoral locality located 20 km northeast of Coalla.

Population
Year	Pop.	±%
1985	658	—
2006	682	+3.6%
2019	842	+23.5%

== Health and education ==
The nearest health center in Goundou is the Health and Social Promotion Center (HSPC) in Kourori.
