= Samboandi, Coalla =

Samboandi
- Interactive map of Samboandi
- Country: Burkina Faso
- Region: Est Region
- Province: Gnagna Province
- Department: Coalla Department

Population (2019 est.)
  - Total: 6,387

Samboandi is a town in the Coalla Department of Gnagna Province in eastern Burkina Faso.

== Geography ==
=== Situation and environment ===
Samboandi is an agropastoral locality scattered in several residential centers, located 27 km east of Coalla (or Koalla).

=== Demography ===
Population
Year	Pop.	±%
2006	2,393	—
2019 (est.)	6,387	+166.9%

== Economy ==
The economy of the commune is linked both to agriculture carried out downstream of the large water reservoir ensuring the irrigation of rainfed rice fields and food crops as well as to pastoralism, which is important in the department.

== Health and education ==
The nearest health center in Samboandi is the Health and Social Promotion Center (HSPC) in Boukargou.
