= Kierga =

- Interactive map of Kierga
- Country: Burkina Faso
- Region: Est Region
- Province: Gnagna Province
- Department: Coalla Department

Population (2019)
  - Total: 485

Kierga is a town in the Coalla Department of Gnagna Province in eastern Burkina Faso. The town has a population of 1,258.

== Geography ==
Kierga, an agropastoral locality scattered among several residential centers, is 14 km north of Coalla.

Population
Year	Pop.	±%
2006	1,412	—
2019	485	−65.7%

== History and education ==
Kierga’s nearest health center is the Bonsiega Health and Social Promotion Center (HSPC).
