= Bombontiangou =

Bombontiangou Bombontiougou
- Interactive map of Bombontiangou
- Country: Burkina Faso
- Region: Est Region
- Province: Gnagna Province
- Department: Coalla Department

Population (2019)
  - Total: 2,618

Bombontiangou is a town in the Coalla Department of Gnagna Province in eastern Burkina Faso.

== Geography ==
Bombontiangou – which is an agropastoral locality dispersed into several residential centers located on the right bank of the Faga River – is located approximately 15 km northwest of Coalla.

Population
Year	Pop.	±%
1985	673	—
2006	1,563	+132.2%
2019	2,618	+67.5%

== Health and education ==
The nearest health center in Bombontiangou is the Bonsiega Health and Social Promotion Center (HSPC).
