= Darsalam, Gnagna =

Darsalam
- Location in Burkina Faso
- Coordinates: 13°29′N 0°11′W
- Country: Burkina Faso
- Region: Est Region
- Province: Gnagna Province
- Department: Coalla Department

Population (2019)
  - Total: 1,988

Darsalam is a town in the Coalla Department of Gnagna Province in eastern Burkina Faso.

== Geography ==
Darsalam is located 12 km northwest of Coalla, on the right bank of the Faga.

Population
Year	Pop.	±%
2006	1,393	—
2019	1,988	+42.7%

== Health and education ==
The nearest health center in Darsalam is the Bonsiega Health and Social Promotion Center (HSPC).
