= Didiemba =

- Interactive map of Didiemba
- Country: Burkina Faso
- Region: Est Region
- Province: Gnagna Province
- Department: Coalla Department

Population (2019)
  - Total: 2,841

Didiemba is a town in Coalla Department, Gnagna Province, Burkina Faso.

Population
Year	Pop.	±%
1985	948	—
2006	1,510	+59.3%
2019	2,841	+88.1%
