= Lamoana =

- Interactive map of Lamoana
- Country: Burkina Faso
- Region: Est Region
- Province: Gnagna Province
- Department: Coalla Department

Population (2019 est.)
  - Total: 1,367

Lamoana is a village in the Coalla Department of Gnagna Province in eastern Burkina Faso.

== Geography ==
Lamoana is an agropastoral community spread out over several residential centers, 22 km northeast of Coalla.

Population
Year	Pop.	±%
2006	512	—
2019 (est.)	1,367	+167.0%

== Health and education ==
The nearest health center in Lamoana is the Health and Social Promotion Center (HSPC) in Kourori.
