= Goulmodjo =

- Country: Burkina Faso
- Region: Est Region
- Province: Gnagna Province
- Department: Coalla Department

Population (2019 est.)
  - Total: 2,669

Goulmodjo is a village in the Coalla Department of Gnagna Province in eastern Burkina Faso.

Population
Year	Pop.	±%
2006	1,000	—
2019 (est.)	2,669	+166.9%

== Health and education ==
The nearest health center in Goulmodjo is the Health and Social Promotion Center (HSPC) in Coalla.
