= Tindangou =

Coordinates: 11°11′N 0°50′E

- Interactive map of Tindangou
- Country: Burkina Faso
- Region: Est Region
- Province: Gnagna Province
- Department: Coalla Department

Population (2019)
  - Total: 908

Tindangou is a village in the Coalla Department of Gnagna Province in eastern Burkina Faso. The village has a population of 504.

== Geography ==
Tindangou is located 2.5 km west of Coalla – and 17 km northeast of National Road 18 – on the other bank of the Faga.

Population
Year	Pop.	±%
1985	1,033	—
2006	530	−48.7%
2019	908	+71.3%

== Health and education ==
The closest health center to Tindangou is the Neiba health and social promotion center (CSPS).
