= Gnimpiema =

Coordinates: 13°24′N 0°06′E

- Interactive map of Gnimpiema
- Country: Burkina Faso
- Region: Est Region
- Province: Gnagna Province
- Department: Coalla Department

Population (2019 est.)
  - Total: 2,234

Gnimpiema is a village in the Coalla Department of Gnagna Province in eastern Burkina Faso.

== Geography ==
=== Situation and environment ===
Gnimpiema is a locality scattered in several residential centers, located about 20 km east of Coalla (or Kolla).

=== Demography ===
Population
Year	Pop.	±%
2006	837	—
2019 (est.)	2,234	+166.9%

== Economy ==
The village is essentially an agropastoral locality.

== Health and education ==
The nearest health centre in Gnimpiema is the Health and Social Promotion Centre (HSPC) in Coalla.
