= Coalla Department =

Coordinates: 13°24′38″N 0°08′13″W

Coalla
- Department
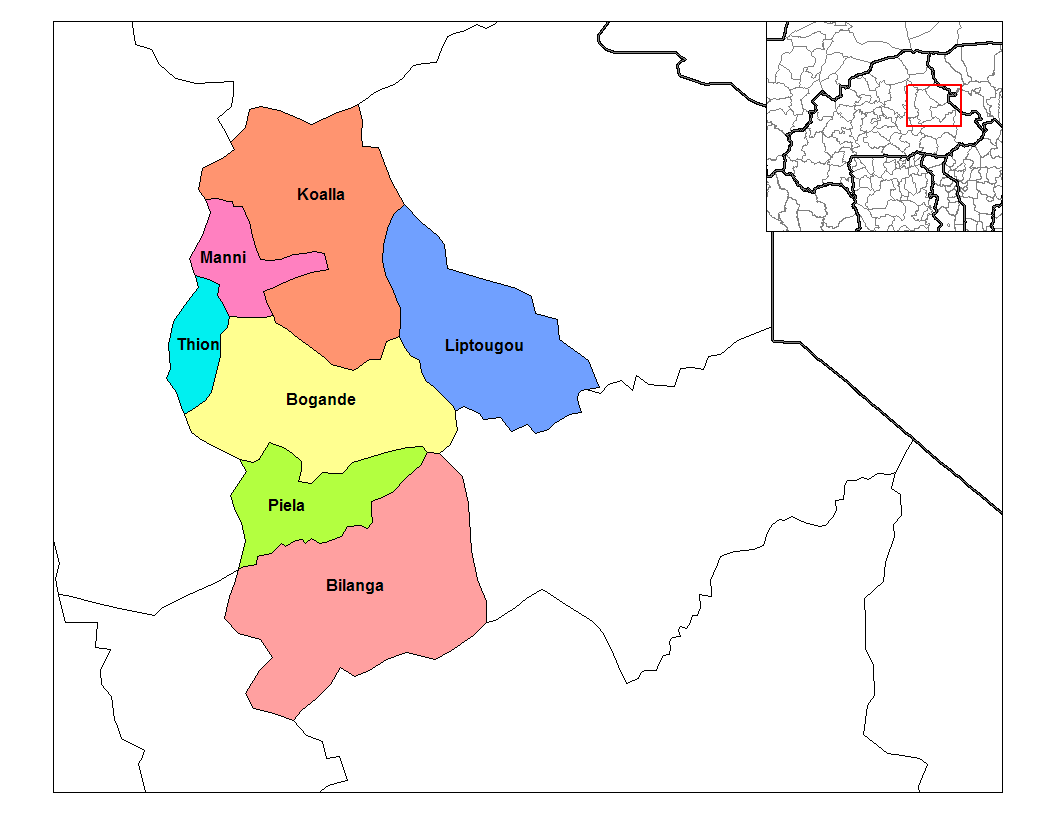
- Coalla Department location in the province
- Country: Burkina Faso
- Province: Gnagna Province

Area
  - Total: 756 sq mi (1,957 km^{2})

Population (2019 census)
  - Total: 86,921
  - Density: 115.0/sq mi (44.42/km^{2})
- Time zone: UTC+0 (GMT 0)

Coalla is a department or commune of Gnagna Province in northern Burkina Faso. Its capital lies at the town of Coalla. It has an area of 1,957 km^{2}.

As of November 16, 2019, it had a population of 86,921.

== Towns and villages ==
It comprises 38 localities:

- Baka
- Bamasgou
- Bambrigoani
- Bampouringa
- Bani
- Banidjoari
- Bombontiangou
- Boudabga
- Boukargou
- Boula
- Coalla (chef-lieu)
- Darsalam
- Diagourou
- Diankongou
- Didiemba
- Dielkou
- Doyana
- Fantiangou
- Ganta
- Gnimpiema
- Goulmodjo
- Goundou
- Kierga
- Kontiandi
- Lamoana
- Mossadeni
- Neiba
- Poka
- Samboandi
- Santiari
- Soula
- Takou
- Tankori
- Thiongori
- Thioure
- Tihandeni
- Tindangou
- Yassougou
