= Dielkou =

- Interactive map of Dielkou
- Country: Burkina Faso
- Region: Est Region
- Province: Gnagna Province
- Department: Coalla Department

Population (2019)
  - Total: 1,943

Dielkou is a village in the Coalla Department of Gnagna Province in eastern Burkina Faso. The village has a population of 996.

== Geography ==
Dielkou, an agropastoral locality scattered among several housing centers, is about 11 km north of Coalla.

Population
Year	Pop.	±%
1985	759	—
2006	1,054	+38.9%
2019	1,943	+84.3%

== Health and education ==
The nearest health center in Dielkou is the Bonsiéga health and social promotion center (HSPC).
