= Kourori =

- Location in Burkina Faso
- Coordinates: 13°32′12″N 0°07′41″E
- Country: Burkina Faso
- Region: Sahel
- Province: Yagha
- Department: Titabé

Kourori is a commune located in the department of Titabé, in the province of Yagha, Sahel region, in Burkina Faso.

== Health and education ==
Kourori is home to a health and social promotion center (CSPS).
