= Poka, Burkina Faso =

Poka
- Interactive map of Poka
- Country: Burkina Faso
- Region: Est Region
- Province: Gnagna Province
- Department: Coalla Department

Population (2019)
  - Total: 3,004

Poka is a town in the Coalla Department of Gnagna Province in eastern Burkina Faso.

== Geography ==
Poka is 12 km northeast of Coalla.

Population
| Year | Pop. | ±% |
|---|---|---|
| 1985 | 1,294 | — |
| 2006 | 1,822 | +40.8% |
| 2019 | 3,004 | +64.9% |

== Health and education ==
The nearest health center to Poka is the Health and Social Promotion Center (HSPC) in Coalla.
