= Diankongou =

- Interactive map of Diankongou
- Country: Burkina Faso
- Region: Est Region
- Province: Gnagna Province
- Department: Coalla Department

Population (2019)
  - Total: 2,044

Diankongou is a village in the Coalla Department of Gnagna Province in eastern Burkina Faso. The village has a population of 966.

== Geography ==
Diankongou, an agropastoral locality scattered in several residential centers, is about 10 km south of Coalla.

Population
Year	Pop.	±%
1985	432	—
2006	1,038	+140.3%
2019	2,044	+96.9%

== Health and education ==
The closest health center to Diankongou is the Coalla health and social promotion center (HSPC).
