= Diagourou, Burkina Faso =

Diagourou
- Location in Burkina Faso
- Coordinates: 13.5°N 0.1°E
- Country: Burkina Faso
- Region: Est Region
- Province: Gnagna Province
- Department: Coalla Department

Population (2019 est.)
  - Total: 3,294

Diagourou is a town in the Coalla Department of Gnagna Province in eastern Burkina Faso.

== Geography ==
Diagourou – an agropastoral community with scattered housing centers – is located 25 km northeast of Coalla.

Population
Year	Pop.	±%
1985	1,768	—
2006	1,234	−30.2%
2019	3,294	+166.9%

== Health and education ==
The nearest health center in Diagourou is the Health and Social Promotion Center (HSPC) in Coalla.
