= Mosha (story) =

1945 Ghanada short story by Premendra Mitra

Mosha (The Mosquito)
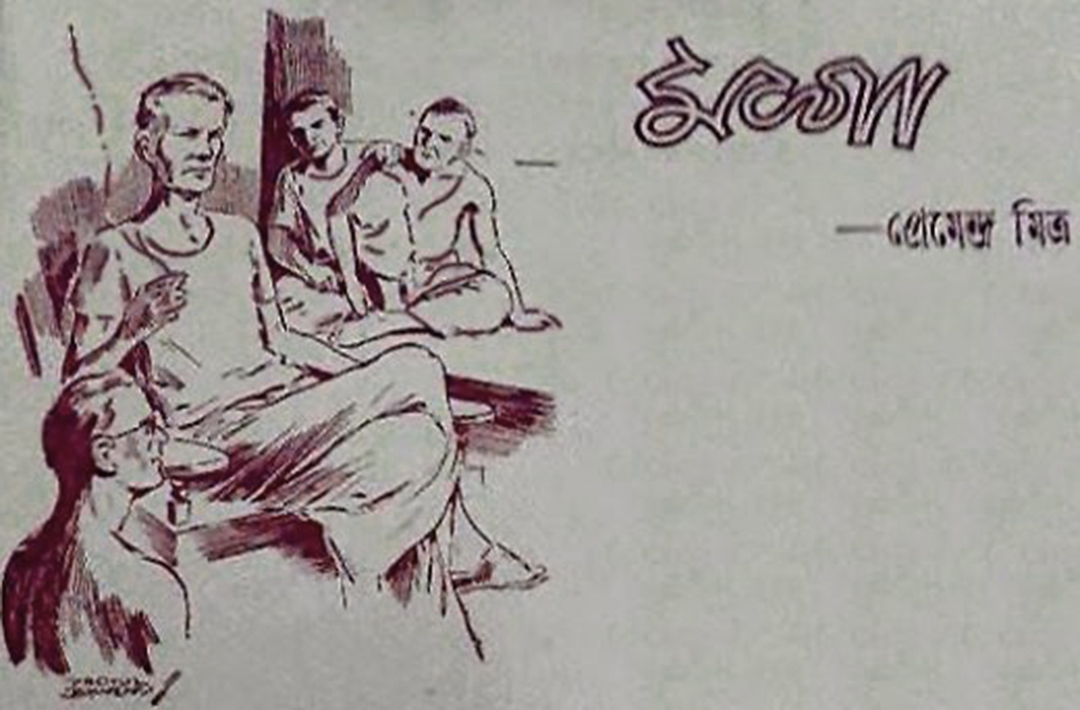
- Illustration by Protul Chandra Bandyopadhyay in 1945
- Author: Premendra Mitra
- Original title: মশা
- Illustrator: Protul Chandra Bandyopadhyay
- Language: Bengali
- Series: GhanaDa
- Genre: Science fiction
- Publisher: Deb Sahitya Kutir
- Publication date: 1945
- Publication place: India
- Media type: Print
- Followed by: নুড়ি (The Pebble)

Mosha (Bengali: মশা) (transl. The Mosquito) is a work of science fiction written in Bengali by the novelist Premendra Mitra. The story was first published by Deb Sahitya Kutir, Kolkata, West Bengal, India, in the Puja Annual titled Alpana (Bengali: আলপনা) in 1945. Ghanashyam Das alias GhanaDa, the fictional character and the protagonist of the GhanaDa series of science-fiction stories appeared for the first time in this novel.

== Characterization ==
The character of Ghanashyam Das, also known as GhanaDa, is described as a bachelor with a dark complexion, tall and bony skeletal structure, and an age range of "anywhere between thirty-five to fifty-five." This description is provided by the author in Mosha, the first story of the GhanaDa series. He resided in the attic on the third floor of a shared apartment (Bengali: মেস বাড়ি) at No. 72, Banamali Naskar Lane, Calcutta, West Bengal, India. He lived alongside other boarders who affectionately called him GhanaDa, with "Da" being a Bengali suffix denoting respect and affection for an elder male. GhanaDa was rarely seen engaging in activities other than narrating fantastical tales to his fellow boarders. His stories encompassed most major world events of the past two hundred years, and he claimed to have visited nearly every place on earth.

গত দুশো বছর ধরে পৃথিবীর হেন জায়গা নেই যেখানে তিনি যাননি, হেন ঘটনা ঘটেনি যার সঙ্গে তাঁর কোনও যোগ নেই

Premendra Mitra, the creator of the character GhanaDa, described him in an interview with A. K. Ganguly published in SPAN in 1974, as follows:

Ghana~da is a teller of tall tales, but the tales always have a scientific basis. I try to keep them as factually correct and as authentic as possible.

== Plot ==
Sakhalin
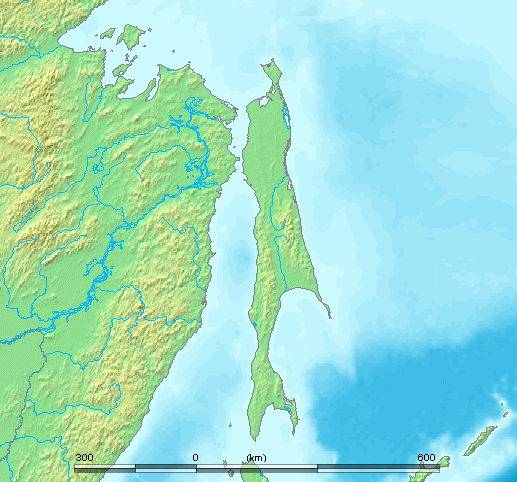

- Location within Russia

Geography
- Location: Russian Far East, Northern Pacific Ocean
- Coordinates: 51°N 143°E
- Area: 72,492 km^{2} (27,989 sq mi)
- Area rank: 23rd
- Highest elevation: 1,609 m (5279 ft)
- Highest point: Lopatin

Administration
- Russia
- Federal subject: Sakhalin Oblast
- Largest settlement: Yuzhno-Sakhalinsk (pop. 174,203)

Demographics
- Population: 497,973 (2010)
- Pop. density: 8/km^{2} (21/sq mi)
- Ethnic groups: Russians, Ainu, Koreans, Nivkhs, Oroks, among many others

One evening in Calcutta in 1945, the boarders of the shared apartment at No. 72, Banamali Naskar Lane gathered in the common room, engaging in casual conversation on various topics. Bipin, one of the boarders, mentioned the efforts to eradicate mosquitoes in his village. At that instance GhanaDa appeared upon the doorway. He was respectfully offered the lone armchair of the room, the best seat available, and a cigarette from Shishir as a loan. GhanaDa humbly stated that he had once killed one mosquito, the only one in his entire lifetime, on 5 August 1939, in the Sakhalin Island in Japan. All the listeners were overwhelmed and request him to narrate the story, and thus the story began.

In the story narrated by GhanaDa, he recounted being employed by a company in Sakhalin to collect amber in 1939. When a Chinese laborer named Tanlin went missing with a bag of amber, GhanaDa, along with Mr. Martin, the doctor, initiated a search. A Gilyak tribesman directed them to a scientific laboratory operated by Mr. Nishimara, an entomologist. It was revealed that Mr. Nishimara was genetically engineering mosquitoes to become agents of biological warfare, and Tanlin had fallen victim to one of his experiments. When a genetically modified mosquito landed on Mr. Nishimara's face and stung him, sealing his fate, GhanaDa killed the mosquito by slapping Mr. Nishimara. This act eliminated a significant threat to humanity. GhanaDa declared that he never intended to kill another mosquito for the rest of his life.

মশা মারবার পরিশ্রমেই যেন হাঁপিয়ে একটা দীর্ঘশ্বাস ছেড়ে ঘনাদা বললেন, "জীবনে তারপর মশা মারতে আর প্রবৃত্তি হয়নি"

== Characters ==
- Ghanashyam Das alias Ghanada
- Bipin (appeared in this story only)
- Shishir
- Author (anonymous in this story. However, now we know it was Sudhir)
- Tanlin (a Chinese labourer)
- Mr. Martin (doctor)
- Mr. Nishimara (a Japanese entomologist)
- An African attendant of Mr. Nishimara

== Important dates ==
- 5 August 1939: GhanaDa killed one genetically engineered mosquito at Sakhalin island.
- 1 September 1939: World War II began.
- 11 August 1945: Russia invaded Sakhalin South.
- 15 August 1945: Japan surrendered, ending World War II.

== Historical relevance ==
World War II is generally considered to have begun on 1 September 1939, with Germany's invasion of Poland and the subsequent declarations of war on Germany by France and the United Kingdom. GhanaDa's appearance on Sakhalin Island on 5 August 1939, occurred just before the onset of World War II. At that time, Sakhalin Island was divided into two parts: the northern part was controlled by Russia and the southern part by Japan. On 11 August 1945, Russia invaded the Japanese-controlled part of Sakhalin, and Japan surrendered on 15 August 1945, effectively ending World War II. This date corresponded with 28 Aashwin 1352 in the Bengali calendar, coinciding with Maha Navami during the Durga Puja festival in Bengal and India.

When Alpana, the Puja Annual of Deb Sahitya Kutir, was released in 1945, the events on Sakhalin Island were still recent news, making GhanaDa's story particularly resonant with readers. GhanaDa had anticipated the story's impact.

আমরা ফ্যাল ফ্যাল করে তাঁর দিকে চেয়ে আছি দেখে একটু চুপ করে থেকে আবার বললেন, "সাখালীন দ্বীপের নাম শুনেছ, কিন্তু কিছুই জানোনা – কেমন?"

== Scientific relevance ==
মশা – সাখালীন দ্বীপে ঘনাদা

Biological engineering

The development of biological warfare has been undertaken by many countries. During World War II and afterwards, nations including the US, Germany, and Japan engaged in the development of biological warfare. The author, Premendra Mitra, was knowledgeable about these advancements in Japan and elsewhere, incorporating this theme into the pioneering novel of the GhanaDa series.

Anthropology

Since 7000 BCE, the predominant tundra belt between the Arctic Ocean and the Anadyr River, as well as the taiga zone between the Anadyr and Koryak Mountains, were inhabited by nomadic hunters primarily pursuing wild reindeer. This was supplemented by inland fishing and plant gathering. The Nivkhi tribes, who resided in Sakhalin and eastern parts of Asia and were known as "Gilyak" until the 1930s, are remnants of these early inhabitants. By 2002, the Gilyak population had dwindled to just 4,902 individuals. In the story, a Gilyak hunter provides GhanaDa with crucial information to solve a problem.
