= Neiba, Burkina Faso =

Neiba
- Interactive map of Neiba
- Country: Burkina Faso
- Region: Est Region
- Province: Gnagna Province
- Department: Coalla Department

Population (2019)
  - Total: 1,408

Neiba is a village in the Coalla Department of Gnagna Province in eastern Burkina Faso.

== Geography ==
Neiba is 1.5 km southwest of Coalla – and 17 km northeast of National Highway 18 – on the other side of the Faga.

Population
Year	Pop.	±%
1985	425	—
2006	766	+80.2%
2019	1,408	+83.8%

== Health and education ==
Neiba hosts a health and social promotion center (HSPC).
