= Boula, Burkina Faso =

Boula
- Location in Burkina Faso
- Coordinates: 13.5°N 0.2°W
- Country: Burkina Faso
- Region: Est Region
- Province: Gnagna Province
- Department: Coalla Department

Population (2019)
  - Total: 1,913

Boula is a village in the Coalla Department of Gnagna Province in eastern Burkina Faso.

== Geography ==
Boula is about 15 km north of Coalla.

Population
Year	Pop.	±%
1985	908	—
2006	887	−2.3%
2019	1,913	+115.7%

== Health and education ==
The nearest health center in Boula is the Bonsiega health and social promotion center (HSPC).
