= Titabé (department) =

- Department
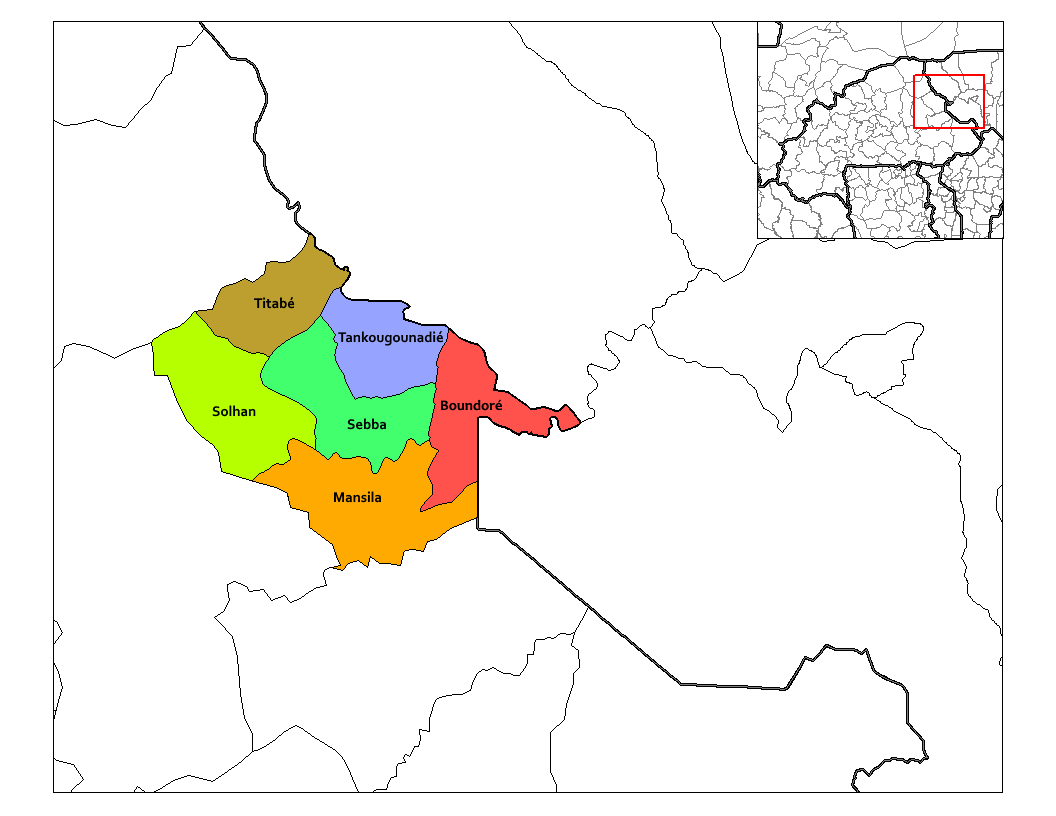
- Titabé Department location in the province
- Coordinates: 13°46′01″N 0°25′59″E
- Country: Burkina Faso
- Region: Plateau-Central Region
- Province: Yagha Province

Area
  - Total: 336 sq mi (871 km^{2})

Population (2019 census)
  - Total: 37,850
  - Density: 113/sq mi (43.5/km^{2})
- Time zone: UTC+0 (GMT 0)

Titabé is a department or commune of Yagha Province in Burkina Faso.
