= Soulas =

Soulas is a surname. Notable people with this surname include:

- Dimitris Soulas (born 1938), Greek photojournalist
- Jehan Soulas (died before 1542), French sculptor
- Léonor Jean Christine Soulas d'Allainval (c. 1700–1753), French playwright
- Maxime Soulas (born 1999), French football player
