= Samboandi, Manni =

Samboandi Samboni
- Interactive map of Samboandi
- Country: Burkina Faso
- Region: Est Region
- Province: Gnagna Province
- Department: Manni Department

Population (2019)
  - Total: 1,512

Samboandi is a village in the Manni Department of Gnagna Province in eastern Burkina Faso.

Population
Year	Pop.	±%
1985	779	—
2006	715	−8.2%
2019	1,512	+111.5%
