= Ghanada =

Fictional character

- Ghanada character
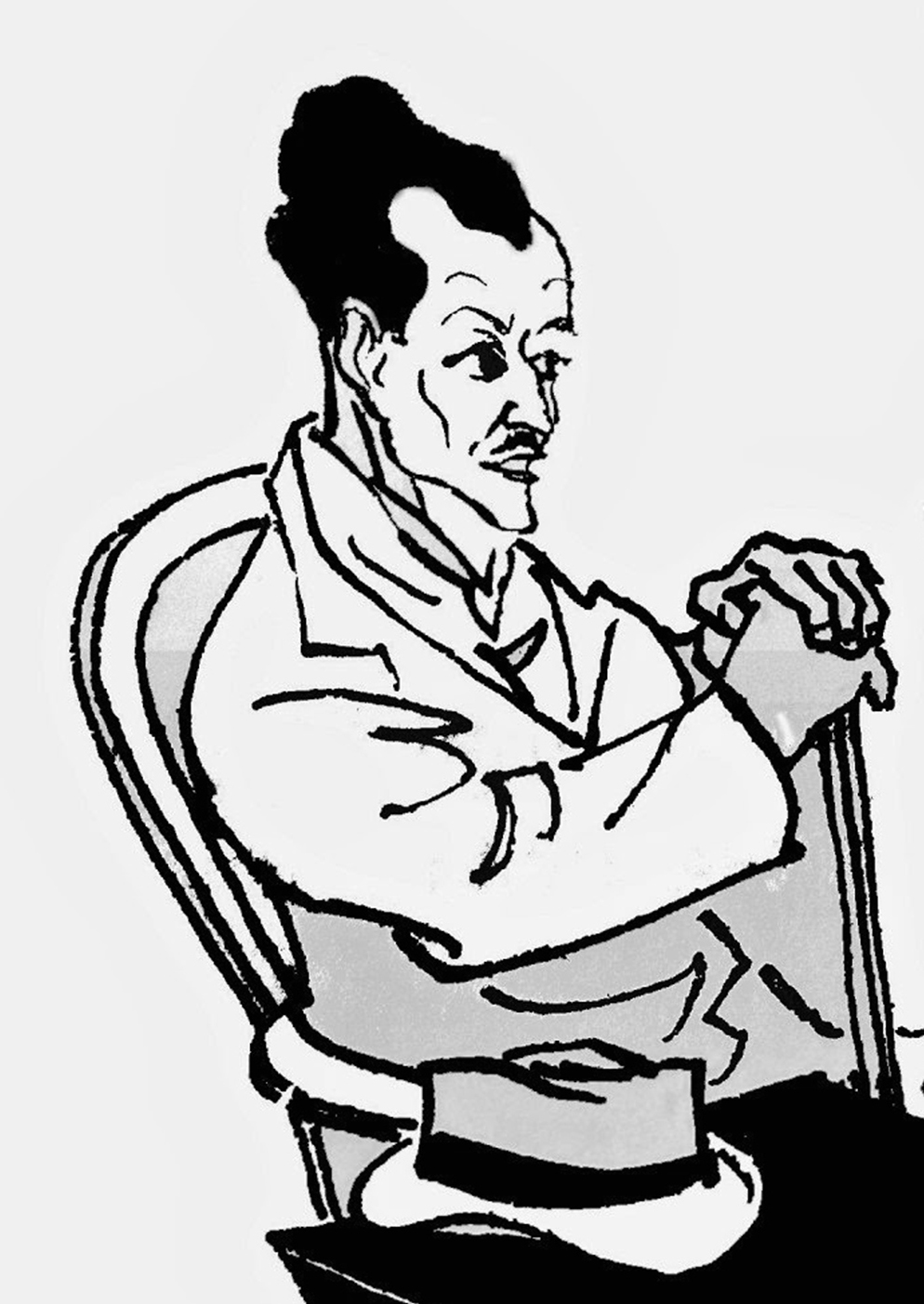
- Art by Ajit Gupta
- First appearance: Mosha (The Mosquito) (1945)
- Last appearance: Mau-Ka-Sha-Bi-Sh bonam Ghanada (1987)
- Created by: Premendra Mitra

In-universe information
- Full name: Ghanashyam Das
- Nicknames: Ghana; Ghanta; Dos; Das
- Occupation: Storytelling; Adventurer
- Relatives: Bachanram Das (16th gen.); Ghanaram Das (22nd gen.)
- Religion: Hindu
- Nationality: Indian
- Age: 35 - 55
- Residence: "Mess-bari" at 72, Banamali Naskar Lane, Behala, Calcutta, West Bengal, India
- Friends: Shibu; Shishir; Gaur; Sudhir; Bipin; Bapi Datta; Ramsharan Babu; Shibapada Babu; Harisadhan Babu; Bhabataran Babu

Ghanashyam Das alias Ghanada alias Ghona-da (Bengali: ঘনাদা), the protagonist of the Ghanada series of science fiction novels written in Bengali, is a fictional character created by Premendra Mitra in 1945. In the novels, the character fights evil and stands against international terrorism. The far-fetched stories take place in multiple international locations, and across a historical timeline. He is depicted regularly outwitting his fellow boarders of the mess-bari at 72, Banamali Naskar Lane, Kolkata (Calcutta). Ghanada was a personification of Premendra Mitra's anti-fascist humanistic ideologies and moral universe. His stories were notably accurate from a historical, geographical and scientific standpoint.

== First appearance ==
Ghanada's first appearance was in a story titled Mosha (The Mosquito), published in the Puja annual Alpana (Bengali: আলপনা) in 1945 published by Deb Sahitya Kutir, Kolkata, West Bengal, India.

Ghanada was engaged by a company in Sakhalin to collect amber sometime during 1939, and in due course, he landed up to a scientific laboratory set by Mr Nishimara, an entomologist, in search of a Chinese labourer who went missing. It was later revealed that Mr. Nishamara was genetically converting the mosquitos into deadly agents of biological warfare. When the lone, genetically engineered mosquito landed on the face of Mr. Nishimara and sealed his fate by stinging him, Ghanada slapped Nishmara to kill the mosquito and eliminated a severe threat towards humanity. He declared he never intended to kill another mosquito ever after in his lifetime.

At the end of the story Ghanada took a deep breath as if he was so tired from killing that mosquito and said, "I never felt like killing a mosquito after that incident."

== Characterization ==
=== Ghanada ===
The character of Ghanashyam Das alias Ghanada was outlined as a bachelor, dark-complexioned male with a tall, boney and skeletal structure, aged "anywhere between thirty-five to fifty-five", as described by the author himself in Mosha- the first story of the Ghanada series. He stayed in the third-floor attic of a shared apartment called "Mess-bari" (Bengali: মেস-বাড়ি) at 72, Banamali Naskar Lane, Calcutta, West Bengal, India, along with other boarders, who called him Ghanada, while Ghana is the shortened form of his name Ghanasyam, and the term "da" is a suffix added to the name of an elder male in Bengal to convey reverence and affection. Though he was rarely found engaged in any activity or work other than telling fantastic tales to the boarders of the apartment, sitting in his armchair and cadging cigarettes from his fellow boarders, his tall tales engaged him with most of the major events that had happened in the world for last two hundred years and there was no place on earth which he didn't visit.

"গত দুশো বছর ধরে পৃথিবীর হেন জায়গা নেই যেখানে তিনি যাননি, হেন ঘটনা ঘটেনি যার সঙ্গে তাঁর কোনও যোগ নেই"

Premendra Mitra, the creator, described Ghanada in an interview by A K Ganguly published in SPAN in 1974, as below:

"Ghana~da is a teller of tall tales, but the tales always have a scientific basis. I try to keep them as factually correct and as authentic as possible."

=== Location/place of story telling ===
All the stories were told in a north Calcutta quintessential boarding house (Mess Bari in Bengali) located at 72, Banamali Naskar Lane. It was a time, after the second world war, when single working men flocked together renting boarding houses all across the city, called Mess Bari, which had been part and parcel of nineteenth and twentieth century Calcutta's checkered past. The ground floor was designated for dining and the kitchen, the first floor housed all rooms for the boarders, and a common room. The second floor consisted of the roof terrace and a single small cabin, which in Bengali is known as Chile Kotha. Ghanada stayed in the second floor attic.

=== Why did Ghana-da come for? ===
After forty years of publication of the first Ghanada story, the author revealed when and how Ghanada appeared for the first time in the story Ghanada Elen (Ghanada Came) in 1985 upon the requested by the fans of Ghanada.

"It was the early days of this mess-bari many years ago, when the four bachelor friends moved in to this house forming a contributary kitchen while trying to settle down in the city of Calcutta, a strange unknown person, whose age could be anywhere between thirty-five to fifty-five, with a thin and lanky structure like an axe, having a deep baritone voice and carrying a small canvas bag, approached them for help.

He needed accommodation to get a confirmed postal address because seven years ago while he was working as an expert in guns, he promised Bob Kenneth, a licensed hunter in Uganda, that if his help was ever needed Bob should put an advertisement in the Times (London) magazine with a symbol of Jerboa.

After keeping a keen eye for the last seven years, at last he saw the most awaited advertisement in the Times at the Imperial Library of Calcutta, while spending a few days in the city. He sent a letter to Bob asking for details in reply to the advertisement letting him know about this house in particular at 72 Banamali Naskar Lane as his address for receiving communication. Now he should wait here only for a few days till the reply comes from Bob.

He himself had chosen a dilapidated rooftop attic room on the second floor and assured that he could manage with the broken bed which he already cleaned up, just for a few days.

The young four friends eagerly agreed to extend all the help to this distressed man, only in lieu of the magical opportunity of listening from him the exceptionally impressive, surprising, and awe-inspiring story involving Jerboa (having no idea what it was), and implored upon him to stay as long as the reply reaches him. The strange man settled in the attic with his canvas bag. The canvas bag had long gone but the reply from Bob Kenneth never reached in all these years. The man in distress, Ghanada, the fantastic teller of incredible tall tales, settled in the mess-bari rent-free for years to come."

=== Other characters ===
The stories are broadly classified into two varieties:

Science-based stories

The science-based stories were generally told in the common room of 72, Banamali Naskar Lane in front of the charmed boarders who consisted of four permanent young men - Shibu, Shishir, Gaur, and Sudhir, with some other members who appeared occasionally.

The character of Ghanada is believed to be based on Sri Bimal Ghosh, an acquaintance of Premendra Mitra whom he used to call "TenDa". He was a co-boarder during Mitra's stay in a boarding house at Gobinda Ghoshal Lane of Bhabanipur in his early years. The other four main characters were also believed to be based on real persons.

- Shibu was Shibram Chakraborty, the writer
- Shishir was Sisir Mitra, producer and actor in Bengali movies, co-founder of Basumitra Chitra Pratisthan
- Gaur was Gauranga Prasad Basu, co-founder of Basumitra Chitra Pratisthan
- Sudhir was the author of the stories of Ghanada in the first person, and it was the nickname of Premendra Mitra himself.
- Bipin appeared only in Mosha (The Mosquito).
- Bapi Datta appeared in Hnas and Suto, and so on.

There were two very important and essential characters without whom the Ghanada stories would have been incomplete. They were Banoary, the cook, and Rambhuj, the attendant. Some other staff of the mess-bari were also mentioned in various stories from time to time, such as Uddab, the water provider, and Lachhmania, the cleaner.

History based stories

The history-based stories were told in a completely different environment and the audience was also different. Almost every evening five persons, or at least four out of them, used to gather at a seating arrangement around a tree in Rabindra Sarobar by the side of a lake and discuss various matters ranging from health, imperialism, market rate to Vedanta, philosophy, etc. These five men were -

- Ramsharan Babu, whose belly was as big as a round pot (Bengali: রামশরণবাবু, যার উদর কুম্ভের মত স্ফীত)
- Shibapada Babu, whose head was as smooth as a marble (Bengali: শিবপদবাবু, যার মস্তক মর্মরের মত মসৃণ)
- Harisadhan Babu, whose hair was as white as Saccharum spontaneum (Bengali: হরিসাধনবাবু, যার শিরশোভা কাশের মত শুভ্র)
- Bhabataran Babu, who was as obese as an elephant (Bengali: ভবতারনবাবু, মেদভারে যিনি হস্তির মত বিপুল)
- and Ghanashyam Babu (Ghanada), who was as slender and disproportionate as a camel. (Bengali: ঘনশ্যামবাবু, যিনি উষ্ট্রের মত শীর্ণ ও সামঞ্জস্যহীন)

== Works ==
=== Short stories ===
Year of publication	Short story	Title in English	Places and time	Ghanada's engagement at the time of the story	Scientific base	Collection
1945	Mosha	The Mosquito	Sakhalin Island; 5 August 1939	Collecting Amber	Genetic engineering and biological warfare using mosquito	Ghanadar Galpo
1947	Nuri	The Pebble	Mikiu Island, New Hebrides, now Vanuatu	Sandalwood business	Volcanic activities in the South Pacific Ocean	Ghanadar Galpo
1948	Ghori	The Clock	Apia harbour, Samoa; 17 September 1937	Espionage for the Allies under cover of Import / Export business	Ghanada neutralized the time bomb mechanism encased in clocks	Awditiyo Ghanada
1948	Poka	The Insect	Riga, Latvia; 22 December 1931; Alodia by the Al El Arab river, South Sudan	Doing morning walk in the snow	Genetic engineering and biological warfare using locust	Ghanadar Galpo
1949	Machh	The Fish	Belgian Congo, Africa; 23 September 1929	Ghanada was collecting specimen for a French zoo	He predicted earthquake observing the agitation of cat fish	Ghanadar Galpo
1949	Chhori	The Stick	Antarctica	Ghanada was looking for ambergris in Antarctica	He picked up a diamond from the base of a mountain top lake in Antarctica, and a volcano exploded	Ghanadar Galpo
1950	Robinson Crusoe Meye Chhilen	Robinson Crusoe was a Woman	-	-	-	Premendra Mitrar Sreshtho Galpo
1950	Kaanch	Glass	City of Lobito, in the province of Benguela; 1 September 1939	Ghanada was exploring for Uranium	He foiled a Nazi plot to retrieve Uranium from Africa	Ghanadar Galpo
1952	Tupi	The Cap	Khumbu glacier, Nepal and M. Everest	Ghanadas encounter with a Yeti, the Abominable Snowman near Mt. Everest	He found some fungus, similar to the Caterpillar fungus, scientifically known as Ophiocordyceps sinensis (syn. Cordyceps sinensis), also known as Yarsagumba or Keeda Jadi, which kept him warm and breathing while crossing over Mt. Everest	Ghanadar Galpo
1952	Lattu	The Top	Dyke lake, Labrador, Canada; January, 1948	Ghanada collaborated with the British Airforce	Ghanada flew a UFO	Ghanadar Galpo
1953	Dada	Brother	Berlin; Sometime after 2 September 1945	Ghanada's search for a supercomputer with AI that was deviced to control the human race	He destroyed it	Awdwitiyo Ghanada
1954	Phuto	The Hole	Cape Chelyuskin, Russia	Ghanada was vising his friend Dr. Minoski's radio telescope lab	He travelled to Mars and came back using a Wormhole in Space-Time	Awdwitiyo Ghanada
1955	Dnaat	The Tooth	-	-	-	Awdwitiyo Ghanada
1957	Hnash	The Duck	Gurla Mandhata, China; 17 July 1935	Ghanada was exploring the Kailash and Manas Sarovar areas in Himalayas	He retrieved a map showing a lake containing deuterium oxide in high altitude Himalayas	Awdwitiyo Ghanada
1958	Suto	Thread	-	-	-	Awdwitiyo Ghanada
1959	Shishi	The Phial	-	-	-	Abar Ghanada
1960	Dhil	The Pebble	-	-	-	Abar Ghanada
1961	Knecho	The Worm	-	-	-	Ghanadake Vote Din
1962	Chhata	The Umbrella	-	-	-	Ghanada Nityonotun
1963	Chhnuch	The Needle	-	-	-	Abar Ghanada
1963	Machhi	The Fly	-	-	-	Ghanadake Vote Din
1964	Ghanadake Vote Din	Vote for Ghanada	-	-	-	Ghanadake Vote Din
1964	Ghanada Kulfi Khan na	Ghanada doesn't eat Ice cream	-	-	-	Ghanada Nityonotun
1964	Jawl	Water	Johannesburg, South Africa	Ghanada posed as a native illiterate laborer	He highlighted the significance of Karakul sheep, commonly known as Swakara sheep	Ghanada Nityonotun
1965	Chowkh	The Eyes	-	-	-	Ghanada Nityonotun
1966	Bhasha	Language	-	-	-	Ghanadar Juri Nei
1967	Tel	Oil	-	-	-	Ghanadar Juri Nei
1968	Mati	Soil	-	-	-	Ghanadar Juri Nei
1968	Dhulo	Dust	Bells Cay, Bahamas	GhanaDa was looking for Strombus gigas	He neutralized a tornado	Jnar Naam Ghanada
1969	Maap	Measure	-	-	-	Ghanadar Juri Nei
1969	Kada	Mud	-	-	-	Jnar Naam Ghanada
1969	Naach	Dance	Beni river basin, Bolivia	GhanaDa was traveling by train from Santa Cruz de la Sierra to Puerto Suárez	He decoded the round and waggle dance of the honeybees conveying distance and direction relative to the sun	Jnar Naam Ghanada
1970	Mulo	Radish	Oymyakon, Sakha Republic, Russia	Exploring the habitat of Reindeer in Siberia	Extracted Eleuthero (Siberian ginseng) with the help of Siberian mink	Jnar Naam Ghanada
1970	Tawl	Heavy Water	MacDonnell Ranges, Australia	GhanaDa was earching for mega-heavy water	Tsar Bomba, Soviet thermonuclear bomb that was detonated in a test over Novaya Zemlya island in the Arctic Ocean on 30 October 1961, utilized heavy isotopes of hydrogen (deuterium and tritium) as thermonuclear fuel, which are components of heavy water.	Jnar Naam Ghanada
1970	Ghanadar Dhonurbhango	Ghanada's bow-breaking	-	-	-	Duniyar Ghanada
1971	Knata	The Thorn	-	-	-	Duniyar Ghanada
1972	Bhela	The Raft	-	-	-	Ghanadar Chingri Brittanto
1973	Berajaale Ghanada	Ghanada in kiddle	-	-	-	Ghanadar Phnu
1973	Prithibi Barlona Kyano	Why the Earth didn't Expand	-	-	-	Duniyar Ghanada
1974	Gaan	The Song	-	-	-	Duniyar Ghanada
1974	Shanti Porbe Ghanada	Ghanada in the Peace episode	-	-	-	Ghanadar Hij Bij Bij
1975	Keechak bodhe Ghanada	Ghanada in the killing of Keechak	-	-	-	Duniyar Ghanada
1975	Bharat Judhhe Pnipre	Ants in the Great Indian war	-	-	-	Ghanadar Phnu
1975	Gul-e Ghanada		-	-	-	Ghanadar Hij Bij Bij
1975	Timi Taran Ghanada / Ghanadar Hij Bij Bij	Whale rescuer Ghanada	-	-	-	Ghanadar Hij Bij Bij
1976	Khandobdaahe Ghanada	Ghanada at Khandob-burning	-	-	-	Ghanadar Phnu
1977	Kurukkhetre Ghanada	Ghanada at Kurukshetra	-	-	-	Ghanadar Phnu
1978	Ghanadar Phnu	Ghanada's Puff	-	-	-	Ghanadar Phnu
1980	Jayadrath bodhe Ghanada	Ghanada at the Killing of Jayadrath	-	-	-	Ghanadar Chingri Brittanto
1982	Ghanadar Chithipatro o Mau-Ka-Sha-Bi-Sh	Ghanada's letters and Mau-Ka-Sha-Bi-Sh	-	-	-	Ghanada o Mau-Ka-Sha-Bi-Sh
1982	Parashare Ghanaday	Ghanada vs Parashar	-	-	-	Ghanada o Mau-Ka-Sha-Bi-Sh
1983	Mau-Ka-Sha-Bi-Sh o Ghanada	Mau-Ka-Sha-Bi-Sh and Ghanada	-	-	-	Ghanada o Mau-Ka-Sha-Bi-Sh
1983	Mau-Ka-Sha-Bi-Sh theke Rasomalai	Mau-Ka-Sha-Bi-Sh to Rasomalai	-	-	-	Ghanada o Mau-Ka-Sha-Bi-Sh
1983	Ghanadar Shalyo Somachar	Ghanada's Surgery	-	-	-	Ghanada o Mau-Ka-Sha-Bi-Sh
1983	Atharo noy, Unish	It's Nineteen, not Eighteen	-	-	-	Ghanada o Mau-Ka-Sha-Bi-Sh
1984	Mau-Ka-Sha-Bi-Sh - Ekbachon na Bahubachon	Is Mau-Ka-Sha-Bi-Sh - Singular or Plural?	-	-	-	Ghanada o Mau-Ka-Sha-Bi-Sh
1984	Ghanada Phirlen	Ghanada Returns	-	-	-	Ghanada o Mau-Ka-Sha-Bi-Sh
1985	Ghanadar Bagh	Ghanada's Tiger	-	-	-	Awgronthito
1985	Ghanada Elen	Ghanada Arrives	-	-	-	Ghanadar Chingri Brittanto
1985	Kalo phuto Sada phuto	Blackhole white-hole	-	-	-	Awgronthito
1986	Halley-r Bechal	Halley's Wild Behaviour	-	-	-	Ghanadar Chingri Brittanto
1986	Ghanadar Chingri Brittanto	Ghanada's Shrimp Tale	-	-	-	Ghanadar Chingri Brittanto
1987	Mau-Ka-Sha-Bi-Sh bonam Ghanada	Mau-Ka-Sha-Bi-Sh vs. Ghanada	-	-	-	Awgronthito

=== Novellas ===
Year	Novella	Name (in English)	Collection
1966	Agra Jakhon Talomalo	When Agra was unsteady	Agra Jakhon Talomalo
1967	Das Holen Ghanada	Thus the Title of 'Das'	Agra Jakhon Talomol

=== Novels ===
Year	Novel	Name (in English)
1967	Shurjyo Knadley Sona	Golden tears of the Sun
1972	Mongolgrohe Ghanada	Ghanada in Mars
1978	Tel Deben Ghanada	Ghanada will pay for the Fuel
1986	Mandhatar tope o Ghanada	The bait of Mandhata and Ghanada

=== Others ===
Year	Name	Type	Name (in English)	Published in
1956	Ghanar Bachon / Ultohata Jabe ki?	Poem	Ghana Says	Joyjatra
1979	Tini Nei	Incomplete short story	He is Missing	Pokkhiraj
1981	Prithibi Jodi Barto	Skit		Ghanada Bichitra
1980	Mahabharote Ghanada	Incomplete novel	Ghanada in the Mahabharata	Jhalmal
1987	Awsawmpurno Ghanada	Incomplete short story		Sharodiyo Kishore Gyan Bigyan

=== Published books and compendiums ===
- 1956 - Ghanadar Galpo by Premendra Mitra, Kolkata: Indian Associated Publishing Co. Private Ltd.
- 1959 - Adwityo Ghanada by Premendra Mitra, Kolkata: Indian Associated Publishing Co. Private Ltd.
- 1963 - Abar Ghanada by Premendra Mitra, Kolkata: Indian Associated Publishing Co. Private Ltd.
- 1964 - Ghanadake Vote Din by Premendra Mitra, Kolkata: Indian Associated Publishing Co. Private Ltd.
- 1966 - Ghanada Nityonotun by Premendra Mitra, Kolkata: Indian Associated Publishing Co. Private Ltd.
- 1968 - Agra Jakhon Talomawl by Premendra Mitra, Kolkata: Ananda Publishers Private Limited.
- 1969 - Shurjo Knadley Sona by Premendra Mitra, Kolkata: Gronthoprokash.
- 1970 - Ghanadar Juri Nei by Premendra Mitra, Kolkata: Shoibya Prakashan Bibhag.
- 1971 - Jnar Naam Ghanada by Premendra Mitra, Kolkata: Ananda Publishers Private Limited.
- 1973 - Mongolgrohey Ghanada by Premendra Mitra, Kolkata: Shoibya Pustakalay.
- 1975 - Ghanashyam-da (Hindi: घनश्याम-दा) by Premendra Mitra, Radhakrishna Prakashan.
- 1976 - Duniyar Ghanada by Premendra Mitra, Kolkata: Deys Publishing.
- 1976 - Aphuronto Ghanada by Premendra Mitra, Kolkata: Saksharata Prakashan / Pashchimbanga Niraksharata Doorikaran Samiti.
- 1976 - Ghanashyam-da ke aur kisse (Hindi: घनश्याम-दा के और किससे) by Premendra Mitra, Radhakrishna Prakashan.
- 1978 - Ghanadar Phnu by Premendra Mitra, Kolkata: Ananda Publishers Private Limited.
- 1979 - Tel Deben Ghanada by Premendra Mitra, Kolkata: Ananda Publishers Private Limited.
- 1981 - Ghanada Bichitra by Premendra Mitra, Kolkata: Indian Associated Publishing Company.
- 1982 - The Adventures of Ghanada, translated by Lila Majumdar, New Delhi: National Book Trust, India.
- 1983 - Ghanadar Hij Bij Bij by Premendra Mitra, Kolkata: Pakshiraj Prakashani.
- 1985 - Ghanada O Mou-Ka-Sha-Bi-Sh by Premendra Mitra, Kolkata: Shoibya Prakashan Bibhag.
- 1987 - Mandhatar Tope O Ghanada by Premendra Mitra, Kolkata: Ananda Publishers Private Limited.
- 1988 - Ghanadar Chingri Brittanto by Premendra Mitra, Kolkata: Ananda Publishers Private Limited.
- 1989 - Ghanada O Dui Doshor Mamababu O Parashar by Premendra Mitra, Kolkata: Muktapatra Publications.
- 2004 - Mosquito and Other Stories, translated by Amlan Das Gupta, Kolkata: Penguin, India.

=== Anthology ===
- Ghanada Samagra 1
- Ghanada Samagra 2
- Ghanada Samagra 3

== Ghanada's World Tour ==
Ghanada traveled all over the world covering all the continents many times over. There is a Google Travelogue - "Ghanada's World Tour" (Map) showing all the places where Ghanada had traveled along with the routes of such travels, the references of the stories and other relevant information.

== Legacy ==
During the 1980s Ghanada Club was founded with the participation of Premendra Mitra, Leela Majumdar and others. The club became defunct after a few years. Later, in August 2019, a club with the same name was formed commemorating Ghanada, which has undertaken the archival works pertaining to Ghana Da stories by Mitra involving translation, compilation, audio stories, publication etc.
