= Soula, Gnagna =

Soula
- Location in Burkina Faso
- Coordinates: 13°24′N 0°14′W
- Country: Burkina Faso
- Region: Est Region
- Province: Gnagna Province
- Department: Coalla Department

Population (2019)
  - Total: 7,767

Soula is a town in the Coalla Department of Gnagna Province in eastern Burkina Faso.

== Geography ==
Soula – which brings together five residential centers or major neighborhoods – is located 10 km west of Coalla and 10 km east of national road 18.

Population
Year	Pop.	±%
1985	2,561	—
2006	3,626	+41.6%
2019	7,767	+114.2%

== Health and education ==
Soula hosts a health and social promotion center (HSPC).
