= Soula, Bazèga =

Soula
- Location in Burkina Faso
- Coordinates: 11°58′N 1°17′W
- Country: Burkina Faso
- Region: Centre-Sud Region
- Province: Bazèga Province
- Department: Kombissiri Department

Population (2019)
  - Total: 493

Soula, Burkina Faso is a village in the Kombissiri Department of Bazèga Province in central Burkina Faso.

Population
Year	Pop.	±%
1985	526	—
2006	534	+1.5%
2019	493	−7.7%
