= Boukargou =

- Interactive map of Boukargou
- Country: Burkina Faso
- Region: Est Region
- Province: Gnagna Province
- Department: Coalla Department

Population (2019 est.)
  - Total: 3,366

Boukargou is a town in the Coalla Department of Gnagna Province in eastern Burkina Faso.

== Geography ==
Boukargou – which is an agropastoral locality scattered across several residential centers – is located 22 km southeast of Coalla.

Population
Year	Pop.	±%
2006 (est.)	1,261	—
2019	3,366	+166.9%

== Health and education ==
Boukargou hosts a health and social promotion center (HSPC).
