= Premendra Mitra =

Indian writer and film director (1904–1988)

- প্রেমেন্দ্র মিত্র
- Pronunciation: [ˈpɾemend̪ɾo ˈmit̪ɾo]
- Born: 4 September 1904; Varanasi, United Provinces, British India (now in Uttar Pradesh, India)
- Died: 2 May 1988 (aged 83); Kolkata, West Bengal, India
- Education: South Suburban School (Main), Scottish Church College, Asutosh College
- Occupations: Poet, writer, director
- Spouse: Beena Mitra
- Writing career
- Genres: Science fiction, Ghost stories, Rhymes, Detective fiction, Fairytale, Coming-of-age story
- Notable awards: Rabindra Puraskar; Padma Shri
- Movements: Kallol, Little magazine movement

Premendra Mitra (Bengali: প্রেমেন্দ্র মিত্র, Bengali pronunciation: [ˈpɾemend̪ɾo ˈmit̪ɾo]; 4 September 1904 – 3 May 1988) was an Indian poet, writer and film director in the Bengali language. He was also a practitioner of Bengali science fiction. His critique of humanity led him to believe that for it to survive, human beings had to "forget their differences and be united".

== Birth and family ==
Premendra Mitra was born on 4 September 1904 at his father's workplace Varanasi. His ancestral house was at Rajpur in the district of South 24 Parganas of West Bengal. He belonged to the renowned Mitra family of Konnagar (in Hooghly district, West Bengal). His father's name was Gyanendranath Mitra and his mother was Suhasini Debi. His grandfather's name was Srinath Mitra. He lost his mother at an early age.

== Life ==
Premendra Mitra was born in Varanasi, India where his father Gyanendranath Mitra was an employee of the Indian Railways and because of that he had the opportunity to travel to many places in India. Having lost his mother, who died during his childhood, he was brought up by his grandparents in Uttar Pradesh and spent his later life in Calcutta (now Kolkata) and Dhaka. He was a student of South Suburban School (Main) and enrolled for a BA at the Scottish Church College in Calcutta which he left prematurely to study agriculture in Santiniketan with a friend of Rabindranath Tagore, Leonard Elmhirst. Because it did not hold his interest, he returned to education first on an undergraduate course in Dhaka and in 1925 at Asutosh College in Calcutta where he assisted the research of Dinesh Chandra Sen. In particular, his creation of the character of GhanaDa [ঘনাদা] (meaning: 'Elder brother Ghana' in Bengali) won him public recognition.

== Bibliography ==
=== Poems ===
- Prothoma (First Lady)
- Somrat (The Emperor)
- Feraari Fouj (The Lost Army) Poetries:Fhyan [ফ্যান]
- Sagor Theke Fera (Returning From The Sea)
- Horin Cheeta Chil (Deer, Cheetah, Kite) Poetries: Khunt [খুঁত] (Wrong)
- Kokhono Megh (An Occasional Cloud)
- Ananya (One-of-a-kind, Unique)
- Khuda wahid (Allah)

=== Short story collections ===
==== Bengali ====
- PonchoShor [পঞ্চশর] (The Five Arrows)
- Benami Bandar [বেনামি বন্দর] (Unknown Harbour)
- Putul O Protima [পুতুল ও প্রতিমা] (Doll And Clay Image of Goddess)
- Mrittika [মৃত্তিকা] (Earthen image)
- Ofuronto [অফুরন্ত] (Endless)
- Dhuli Dhusor [ধূলি ধূসর] (Fade As Dust)
- Mohanagar [মহানগর] (The Great City)
- Jol Payra (Water Pigeon)
- Sreshto Golpo [শ্রেষ্ঠ গল্প] (Best Stories)
- Nirbachita [নির্বাচিত] (Selected)

==== English ====
(Not actually written by him, later translated)

- Snake And Other Stories
- Mosquito and Other Stories
- Adventures of Ghanada

==== For children ====
- MayurPankhi [ময়ূরপঙ্খী]
- SagorDanri [সাগরদাঁড়ি]
- MakorMukhi [মকরমুখী]

=== Rhymes ===
- Hariye [হারিয়ে]
- Borong [বরং]
- Misti Megh [মিষ্টি মেঘ] (A Sweet Cloud)
- Onko [অঙ্ক] (Mathematics)
- Misti [মিষ্টি] (Sweet)
- Duti Banshi [দুটি বাঁশি] (The Two Flutes)
- Megher Ghurhi [মেঘের ঘুড়ি] (The Kite of Cloud)

=== Fairy tales, ghost stories and teenager stories ===
- Chorui Pakhira Kothay Jay [চড়ুই পাখিরা কোথায় যায়]
- Lighthouse-e [লাইটহাউসে] (At the Lighthouse)
- Satyabadi Suku [সত্যবাদী সুকু] (Suku the Truth Speaker)
- Hatir Danter Kaj [হাতির দাঁতের কাজ] (Work Done By the Tooth of an Elephant)
- Golper Swarge [গল্পের স্বর্গে] (At the Paradise of Stories)
- Putuler Lorai [পুতুলের লড়াই] (The Fight of the Dolls)
- Ramrajye Bidroha [রামরাজ্যে বিদ্রোহ]
- Kurukshetre Bhaja Orfe Brihaddhaja [কুরুক্ষেত্রে ভজা ওরফে বৄহদ্ধজ] (Bhaja Alias Brihaddhaja at the Kurukshetra)
- Ratan Panjali [রতন পাঞ্জালী]
- Ko-Aai [কো-আই]
- Porira Keno Ase Na [পরিরা কেন আসে না] (Why the Fairies Don't Come)
- KalRakkhos Kothay Thake? [কালরাক্ষস কোথায় থাকে?] (Where does KalRakkhos Live?)
- Sanu O DudhRajkumar [সানু ও দুধরাজকুমার] (Sanu And DudhRajkumar)
- KaluSardar (Kalu the Leader)
- Gopon Bahini [গোপন বাহিনী] (The Secret Force)
- Mahuri Kuthite Ek Rat [মাহুরি কুঠিতে এক রাত] (One Night Stand at Mahuri Kuthi)
- Nishutipur [নিশুতিপুর]
- Vuturhe Jahaj [ভূতুড়ে জাহাজ] (The Ghost Ship)

=== Ghost stories ===
- Golper Sheshe (At the End of the Story)
- Rajputanar Morute (At the Desert of the Rajputana)
- Bromhadoityer Math (The Ground of Bromhadoityo (Ghost)

=== Fun stories ===
- Clue [ক্লু] (The Clue)
- Chor [চোর] (The Thief)
- Bhupaler Kopal [ভূপালের কপাল] (The Fate of Bhupal)
- BishwomvorBabur Bibortonbad [বিশ্বম্ভরবাবুর বিবর্তনবাদ] (The Thesis of Evolution by BishwomvorBabu)
- Niruddesh [নিরুদ্দেশ] (Missing Person)

=== Science fictions ===
He was among the pioneers of Bengali science fiction. He started writing science fictions to make children and preteens familiar with science.

- Juddho Jakhan Thamlo [যুদ্ধ যখন থামল] (When the War Stopped)
- Pinpre Puran [পিঁপড়ে পুরাণ] (The Story of the Ants)
- Prithivir Shatru [পৄথিবীর শত্রু] (The Enemies of the Earth)
- Kalapanir Atole [কালাপানির অতলে]
- Mangalbairi [মঙ্গলবৈরী] (The Martian Enemies)
- Koral Korkot [করাল কর্কট] (Horrible Crab)
- Akasher Atonko [আকাশের আতঙ্ক] (The Danger from the Sky)
- Manusher Protidwondi [মানুষের প্রতিদ্বন্দ্বী] (The Rival of the Man)
- MoyDanober Dweep [ময়দানবের দ্বীপ] (The Island of MoyDanob)
- Shomaoner Ron(g) Sada [শমনের রং সাদা] (The White Coloured Death)
- Shukre Jara Giyechhilo [শুক্রে যারা গিয়েছিল] Those Who Went to Venus; previously named as Prithibee Chhariye [পৃথিবী ছাড়িয়ে] (Beyond the Earth)

=== Novels ===
- Paank (The Mud)
- Michhil (The Procession)
- Uponayon (The Ceremony)
- Protishod (The Revenge)
- Kuasha (The Fog)
- Protidhwoni Fere (Echo Returns)
- Haat Baralei Bondhu
- Ora Thake Odhare
- Path Bhuley
- Dabi

=== Characters ===
==== Ghanada ====
Ghanada (Original name: Ghanashyam Das) is a middle-aged resident of a mess at 72, Banamali Naskar Lane in Kolkata, West Bengal with the four young members Shibu, Shishir, Gour and Sudhir (the narrator of the stories). He claims himself to be full of thrilling experience all over the globe (and, even in Mars!) to tackle conspiracies. Also, some of the stories are about Ganado (Original name: Ghonoram Das [ঘনরাম দাস]) in South America, and Bachanram Das [বচনরাম দাস] in Agra at Medieval India, his ancestors. First Ghanada story was মশা (The Mosquito) published in 1945.

==== Mamababu ====
Mamababu (Maternal Uncle) lived in Burma on the account of his service. Original name of this middle-aged man is never stated. His expeditions are written in many novels and short-stories, such as:

- Kuhoker Deshe (In the Land of Illusion)
- Dryagoner Nishwas (The Breath of the Dragon)
- Mamababur Protidan (The Refund of Mamababu)
- Abar Sei Meyeti (That Girl Again)
- Paharer Nam Korali (The Hill Named Korali)

This character inspired Sunil Gangopadhyay to write his famous Kakababu series.

==== Parashor Barma ====
Parashor Barma is a detective but he tries to be a poet. First Parashor story is Goyenda Kobi Parashor [গোয়েন্দা কবি পরাশর] (Detective Poet Parashor) in 1932. Some other stories are:

- Hippie Songe Parashor Barma [হিপি সঙ্গে পরাশর বর্মা] (Parashor Barma in Hippie Company)
- Cluber naam kumati [ক্লাবের নাম কুমতি] (Club named Kumati)
- Nilem daklo parashor Barma [নিলেম ডাকলো পরাশর বর্মা] (Parashor called an auction)
- Premer Chokhe Parashor [প্রেমের চোখে পরাশর] (Parashor in the Eye of Love)
- Parashor Barma O Bhanga Radio [পরাশর বর্মা ও ভাঙ্গা রেডিও] (Parashor Barma and the Broken Radio)
- Parashor Barma O Ashlil Boi [পরাশর বর্মা ও অশ্লীল বই] (Parashor Barma and the Book of Vulger)
- Parashor Ebar Johuri [পরাশর এবার জহুরি]

Two Ghanada tales also include Parashar Barma : Parasharey Ghanaday and Ghanada Phirlen.

==== Mejokorta ====
Mejokorta is a ghost-hunter. Books featuring Mejokorta are collected in an anthology named Bhoot Shikari Mejokorta Ebong...

=== Publishers of Mitra's writings ===
Leela Majumdar translated several Ghanada tales in a volume called Adventures of Ghanada. The latest English translation of his Ghanada stories (Mosquito and Other Stories) was published by Penguin Books India in 2004.

== Filmography ==
Key
§	Indicates a Hindi film

Year	Title	Direction	Screenplay	Lyrics	Cast	Ref.
1937	Graher Pher		Yes			
1940	Tatinir Bichar			Yes		
1941	Ahuti			Yes		
1942	Abhayer Biye			Yes		
1943	Samadhan	Yes	Yes	Yes		
1944	Bideshini	Yes	Yes	Yes		
	Kato Dur		Yes	Yes		
1945	Path Bendhe Dilo	Yes	Yes	Yes		
1945	Rajlakshmi §	Yes				
1947	Abhijog			Yes	Devi Mukherjee, Sumitra Devi	
1947	Notun Khobor	Yes	Yes	Yes		
1948	Kalo Chhaya	Yes	Yes			
1949	Kuasha	Yes	Yes			
1959	Kankantala Light Railway	Yes	Yes	Yes		
1951	Setu	Yes	Yes			
1952	Hanabari	Yes	Yes		Gautam Mukherjee	
1953	Dui Biyai	Yes	Yes			
1954	Moyla Kagaj	Yes	Yes			
1954	Ora Thake Odhare		Yes	Yes	Uttam Kumar, Suchitra Sen	
1955	Dakinir Char	Yes	Yes			
1960	Chupi Chupi Aashey	Yes	Yes		Tarun Kumar	
