= Coalla =

Coalla Koalla
- Location in Burkina Faso
- Coordinates: 13°24′38″N 0°0′13″W
- Country: Burkina Faso
- Region: Est Region
- Province: Gnagna Province
- Department: Coalla Department

Population (2019)
  - Total: 1,998

Coalla is the capital of the Coalla Department of Gnagna Province in eastern Burkina Faso.

== Geography ==
Coalla is located 18 km northeast of Manni – and national road 18, 22 km southeast of Taparko, and 53 km northeast of Bogandé, the provincial capital.

The municipality is located on the right bank of the Faga river.

Population
Year	Pop.	±%
1985	1,634	—
2006	1,385	−15.2%
2019	1,998	+44.3%

== Health and education ==
Coalla hosts a health and social promotion center (HSPC).
