= COVID-19 pandemic in Burkina Faso =

- Disease: COVID-19
- Pathogen: SARS-CoV-2
- Location: Burkina Faso
- First outbreak: Wuhan, China
- Index case: Ouagadougou
- Arrival date: 9 March 2020 (6 years, 8 months, 1 week and 4 days)
- Confirmed cases: 22,231 (updated 5 November 2026)
- Deaths: 400 (updated 5 November 2026)

Government website
- https://www.sante.gov.bf/

The COVID-19 pandemic in Burkina Faso was a part of the worldwide pandemic of coronavirus disease 2019 (COVID-19) caused by severe acute respiratory syndrome coronavirus 2 (SARS-CoV-2). The virus was confirmed to have reached Burkina Faso on 9 March 2020. The death of Rose Marie Compaoré, a member of the National Assembly of Burkina Faso, on 18 March marked the first recorded fatality due to COVID-19 in Sub-Saharan Africa.

== Background ==
On 12 January 2020, the World Health Organization (WHO) confirmed that a novel coronavirus was the cause of a respiratory illness in a cluster of people in Wuhan, Hubei, China, which was reported to the WHO on 31 December 2019. The case fatality ratio for COVID-19 has been much lower than SARS of 2003, but the transmission has been significantly greater, with a significant total death toll. Model-based simulations for Burkina Faso indicate that the 95% confidence interval for the time-varying reproduction number R_{t} fluctuated around 1 in 2021 before rising to around 2 in 2022.

Water shortages are a particular challenge in Burkina Faso. Burkina Faso's coronavirus curfew stopped those in poor areas from accessing communal fountains that only flow at night in the dry season. A lack of water also makes washing hands and general hygiene difficult. In the past year, armed groups have devastated villages in the north and east of Burkina Faso, leaving more than 800,000 people displaced. They have fled to urban centers or sites designated for internally displaced people (IDPs), where overcrowding and lack of access to water are huge problems for families and host communities. Hygiene measures, such as frequent hand washing with soap and water, wearing a mask, and social distancing don't translate into reality for displaced people. In June 2020, slam poet Malika Ouattara focussed the work of her charity, the Slamazone Foundation to promote good hygiene in the face of the pandemic.

Approximately 350,000 people in Burkina Faso urgently need access to sufficient water and shelter facilities to aid them in coping desert-like conditions faced in the isolated parts of Burkina Faso. The UN Refugee Agency warned of more lives to possibly fall at risk in the Burkina Faso Centre Nord and Sahel regions. These places have been pointed out as they shelter hundreds of people displaced from their homes, including small children.

== Timeline ==
=== March 2020 ===
- On 9 March 2020, the first two cases in the country were reported in Burkina Faso.
- On 13 March, the third case was also confirmed: a person who had had direct contact with the first two cases.
- On 14 March, 7 cases confirmed in the country. Five of the new confirmed cases had had direct contact with the first two cases. One is a British national currently working in a gold mine in Burkina Faso and who went to holiday in Liverpool, returning on 10 March, with transits through Vancouver and Paris.
- On 15 March, 8 new cases were confirmed according to a statement from the Ministry of Health, bringing the total number of cases to 15.
- On 17 March, 20 total cases were confirmed.
- On 18 March, the first fatality was confirmed, Rose Marie Compaoré, a 61-year-old woman with pre-existing diabetes.
- On 18 March, 27 total cases were confirmed.
- On 19 March, 33 total cases were confirmed by the Burkina Faso Ministry of Health.
- On 20 March, 40 total cases were confirmed. President Roch Marc Christian Kabore closed airports, land borders and imposed a nationwide curfew to curb the spread of the virus. Burkina Faso's Education Minister Stanislas Ouaro said he had tested positive for the coronavirus.
- On 21 March, 64 total cases and 3 deaths were confirmed. Minister of Mines and Quarries, Oumarou Idani, tested positive for COVID-19 after returning from a conference in Toronto, Canada.
- On 22 March, 75 total confirmed cases. Four key government ministers are confirmed to be infected, these ministers are: Alpha Barry, Minister of Foreign Affairs; Oumarou Idani, Minister of Mines and Quarries; Stanislas Ouaro, Minister of Education; and Simeon Sawadogo, Minister of Interior. Five cases, including the original couple, have recovered. The U.S. Ambassador to Burkina Faso, Andrew Robert Young, tested positive. Five deaths have been confirmed.
- On 23 March, the Burkina Faso Ministry of Health confirmed 100 cases of COVID-19 in Burkina Faso. The U.S. Embassy has begun to repatriate citizens to the United States. Harouna Kaboré, the Minister of Trade, tested positive for coronavirus.
- On March 24, the Burkina Faso Ministry of Health confirmed 114 cases of COVID-19 in Burkina Faso, 89 in Ouagadougou, 4 in Bobo-Dioulasso, 2 in Dedougou, 2 in Boromo, and 1 in Houndé.
- On March 30, with 12 deaths, Burkina Faso has the most fatalities in sub-Saharan Africa. Burkina Faso has just one hospital currently configured to receive coronavirus patients, and it only has a handful of ventilators. At least six government ministers have since tested positive for the virus, as have two foreign ambassadors, from Italy and the United States. A single testing laboratory in Bobo-Dioulasso – a five-hour drive from the capital of Ouagdougou – means suspected cases all over the country have to wait at least 12 hours for results. The government said it wants to establish a second laboratory in Ouagadougou but has no one qualified to set up the equipment in the country. With borders sealed, the process of bringing in an outsider is being delayed.
- By the end March there had been 261 positive tests, 14 deaths and 32 recovered patients. There were 215 active cases at the end of the month.

=== Subsequent cases ===
- 2020 cases

There were 6,631 confirmed cases in 2020. 4,978 patients recovered while 84 persons died. At the end of 2020 there were 1,569 active cases.

- 2021 cases

There were 11,001 confirmed cases in 2021, bringing the total number of cases to 17,632. 11,641 patients recovered in 2021 while 234 persons died, bringing the total death toll to 318. At the end of 2021 there were 695 active cases.

Burkina Faso's first two cases of the omicron variant were confirmed on 17 December.

Modeling carried out by the WHO’s Regional Office for Africa suggests that due to under-reporting, the true cumulative number of infections by the end of 2021 was around 9.2 million while the true number of COVID-19 deaths was around 6,750.

- 2022 cases

There were 4,374 confirmed cases in 2022, bringing the total number of cases to 22,006. 4,977 patients recovered in 2022 while 77 persons died, bringing the total death toll to 395. At the end of 2022 there were 15 active cases.

- 2023 cases

There were 103 confirmed cases in 2023, bringing the total number of cases to 22,109. Five patients died in 2023, bringing the total death toll to 400. At the end of 2023 there were 113 active cases.

== Statistics ==
=== Confirmed new cases per day ===
View source data.

=== Confirmed deaths per day ===
View source data.

== See also ==
- COVID-19 vaccination in Burkina Faso
- COVID-19 pandemic in Africa
- COVID-19 pandemic by country and territory
- 2020 in West Africa
