= Koumbia =

Koumbia may refer to:

- Koumbia, Tuy Province, Burkina Faso
- Koumbia, Balé Province, Burkina Faso
- Koumbia, Mali
- Koumbia, Guinea

== See also ==
- Kumbia (disambiguation)
