= Dounkoun ambush =

2021 ambush in Burkina Faso

- Part of Islamist insurgency in Burkina Faso
| Date | August 8, 2021 |
| Location | Dounkoun, Toeni Department, Burkina Faso |
| Result | JNIM victory |

Belligerents
| Burkina Faso | Jama'at Nasr al-Islam wal Muslimin |

Casualties and losses
| 12 killed 8 injured | Unknown |

On August 8, 2021, jihadists from Jama'at Nasr al-Islam wal-Muslimin ambushed Burkinabe forces in Dounkoun, Toeni Department, Burkina Faso, killing twelve soldiers.

== Background ==
Since 2015, north and northeastern Burkina Faso has been embroiled in an insurgency by the Mali-based Jama'at Nasr al-Islam wal-Muslimin, the Niger-based Islamic State in the Greater Sahara, and the homegrown Burkinabe Ansarul Islam. The area of Toeni Department in northwest Burkina Faso, where Dounkoun is located, is an hotspot of JNIM activity, with a bus bombing in the area killing fourteen civilians. Four days before the Dounkoun ambush, jihadists from the Islamic State in the Greater Sahara launched several coordinated attacks against civilians and soldiers in Oudalan Province.

== Ambush ==
At around 3pm, a convoy escorting Burkinabe soldiers and troops from the elite Rapid Action Group for Surveillance and Intervention (GARSI) were ambushed by JNIM fighters near the village of Dounkoun. Several vehicles were destroyed and others were captured by JNIM. The ambush was in retaliation for the killing of JNIM commander Sidibe Ousmane and religious trainer Bande Amadou. Ousmane and Amadou had been killed the day prior by Burkinabe forces between Diamasso and Bouni in Kossi Province.

Twelve Burkinabe soldiers were killed in the ambush at Dounkoun and eight others were injured. Some soldiers were reported missing initially by the Burkinabe government, but they were found the next morning.
