= Koumbia, Balé, Burkina Faso =

Koumbia
- Location within Burkina Faso
- Coordinates: 11.385605°N 2.793012°W
- Country: Burkina Faso
- Region: Boucle du Mouhoun
- Province: Balé
- Department: Fara

Population (2019)
  - Total: 1,029
- Time zone: UTC+0 (GMT)

Koumbia is a village in southwestern Burkina Faso in the Fara Department of Balé Province (Boucle du Mouhoun Region). The nearest larger town is Fara.

This village should not be confused with the much larger town of Koumbia, the capital of Koumbia Department in the province of Tuy (Hauts-Bassins Region).

Population
Year	Pop.	±%
1985	518	—
2006	682	+31.7%
2019	1,029	+50.9%
