= Kumbia =

Kumbia may refer to:

- Kumbia, Queensland, a town in Australia
- a common alternative spelling of Koumbia, Guinea, a sub-prefecture

== See also ==
- Koumbia (disambiguation)
- Cumbia, a style of music and dance
- Cumbria, a county in England
