= Toeni bus bombing =

2020 school bus explosion in Toeni, Burkina Faso

- Part of Jihadist insurgency in Burkina Faso
- Location: Toeni Department, Sourou Province, Burkina Faso
- Date: January 4, 2020
- Attack type: Improvised explosive device
- Deaths: 14
- Injuries: 9
- Perpetrator: Unknown

The Toeni bus bombing occurred when a school bus drove over an improvised explosive device in Toeni, Burkina Faso, killing fourteen people and injuring nine others on January 4, 2020.

== Background ==
Burkina Faso has been grappling with a jihadist insurgency since 2015, with attacks from groups like Jama'at Nasr al-Islam wal Muslimin and the Islamic State in the Greater Sahara intensifying since 2017 and 2019 respectively. Throughout the war, landmines have plagued rural areas, and are often placed by jihadists along roads used by the military and civilians.

== Bombing ==
Three buses were carrying 160 passengers, 104 of them students. The bus was carrying students returning from the Christmas season along the Toeni-Tougan highway at the time of the bombing. Stanislas Ouaro stated afterwards that the road was closed, due to the risk of attacks in the region.

The bomb was a homemade IED, and no group claimed responsibility for the attack.

The majority of the dead were children, according to a statement from the Burkinabe government. Fourteen people were killed, including seven children, and nine were injured.
