= Houndé Mine =

Mining company in Burkina Faso

Coordinates: 11.418°N 3.533°W

- Location of the Houndé Mine within Burkina Faso
- Location: Houndé, Tuy Province, Burkina Faso
- Products: Gold
- Opened: 2017
- Company: Endeavour Mining (90%), Government of Burkina Faso (10%)
- Website: https://www.endeavourmining.com/our-business/hound%C3%A9-mine

Houndé Mine is a gold mine located in the city of Houndé, Burkina Faso. The mine is 90% owned by Endeavour Mining, and 10% owned by the Government of Burkina Faso. According to Endeavour Mining, the Houndé Mine employs approximately 1,860 people. It is the company's second-biggest gold mine, and accounted for nearly 30% of gold produced by Endeavour Mining in 2023.

== History ==
Endeavour Mining first purchased the land on the site of the mine in 2012, and published a feasibility study for gold mining the following year.

In 2015, the government awarded Endeavour Mining a permit to begin mining, and construction on the mine began the following April.

Commercial production of gold began in the fourth quarter of 2017.

In May 2022, the Houndé Mine was the site of a series of violent protests. Per a government spokesperson, the protests started on May 17 after the government ordered the expulsion of gold miners it said were there without permits. The spokesperson said this "was not to the liking of the miners", who protested by ransacking the mine, injuring seven people and causing significant property damage. The arrest of 12 of the protestors led to another violent episode on May 24, in which two protestors died, one of whom was fatally shot.

Following the September 2022 Burkina Faso coup d'état, Endeavour Mining stated that its work in Burkina Faso was "unaffected by recent political events".

On January 21, 2024, workers at the Houndé Mine went on strike. On January 30, a Burkinabé court ruled that the strike was illegal, and ordered the expulsion of the striking workers. On February 1, Endeavour Mining said that work at the mine had resumed.
