= Kaboré =

Kaboré is a surname. Notable people with the surname include:

- Abdoul Aziz Kaboré (born 1994), Burkinabé footballer
- Charles Kaboré (born 1988), Burkinabé footballer
- Elohim Kaboré (born 2006), Burkinabe footballer
- Gaston Kaboré (born 1951), Burkinabé film director
- Issa Kaboré (born 2001), Burkinabé footballer
- Julien Kaboré (born 1968), Burkinabé Catholic diplomat
- Mohamed Kaboré (born 1980), Burkinabé football goalkeeper
- Moussa Kaboré (born 1982), Burkinabé footballer
- Nayabtigungu Congo Kaboré (born 1948), Burkinabé politician, leader of the Movement for Tolerance and Progress (MTP) party
- Roch Marc Christian Kaboré (born 1957), former President of Burkina Faso
- Zinda Kaboré, politician of Voltaic origin

== See also ==
- Kaboré Tambi National Park, national park in Burkina Faso
- Kabarore
- Kabaré
- Kabourou
