= Houndé Department =

Coordinates: 11.4830°N 3.5170°W

Houndé
- Department
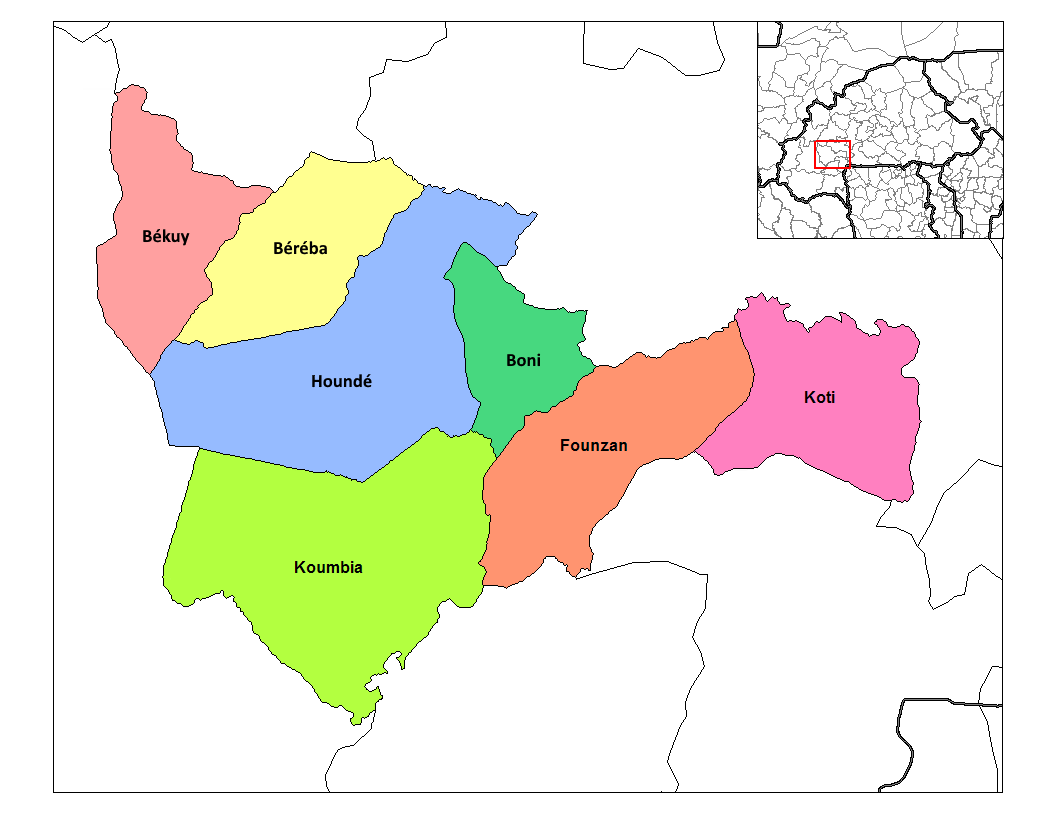
- Houndé Department location in the province
- Country: Burkina Faso
- Province: Tuy Province

Area
  - Department: 481 sq mi (1,245 km^{2})

Population (2019 census)
  - Department: 133,381
  - Density: 277.5/sq mi (107.1/km^{2})
  - Urban: 87,151
- Time zone: UTC+0 (GMT 0)

Houndé is a department or commune of Tuy Province in southern Burkina Faso. Its capital is the town of Houndé.
