= Karaba =

Karaba may refer to:

- Karaba, Burkina Faso
- Karaba, Mali
- Karaba, Kenya (Nyeri County)
