= Kapas =

Kapas may refer to:

- Kapas Island, east of Marang, Malaysia
- Kapas, Bojonegoro, district in East Java, Indonesia
- Kapas Hera, town in Delhi state, India

== People with the name ==
- Andriej Kapaś (born 1989), Polish tennis player
- Boglárka Kapás (born 1993), Hungarian swimmer

== See also ==
- Kapa (disambiguation)
