= Kappa (disambiguation) =

Kappa (Κ or κ) is the tenth letter of the Greek alphabet. Kappa may also refer to:

== Measurement ==
- Cohen's kappa, also known as Kappa statistic
- Fleiss' kappa, another measure of inter-annotator agreement
- Kappa number, a measure of lignin content in wood pulp

== Informatics ==
- Kappa architecture, a purely streaming architecture, as opposed to lambda which uses the same architecture for batch and streaming

== Companies ==
- Kappa (brand), an Italian sportswear brand
- Kappa Publishing Group, publishing company

== Automotive ==
- GM Kappa platform, subcompact rear-wheel drive automobile platform
- Lancia Kappa, an executive car
- Hyundai Kappa engine, automobile engine series

== Places ==
- Kappa, Illinois, a village
- Kappa Island, Antarctic island

== Other uses ==
- Kappa (folklore), a Japanese turtle-like humanoid
- Kappa (novella), by Ryūnosuke Akutagawa
- Kappa (Dungeons & Dragons), a game creature
- Death Kappa, a Japanese kaiju film
- Kappa (rocket), a family of Japanese sounding rockets
- Kappa TV, a TV channel based in Kerala
- Knowledge and Power Preparatory Academy IV or KAPPA IV, a middle school in the Bronx, New York City
- "Kappa", a 1999 song by Mogwai from the album Come On Die Young
- Kappa chain, a type of immunoglobulin light chain, part of the human immune system
- Kappa, one of the most popular emotes on live streaming platform Twitch
- Kappa effect, a sensory illusion relating to the human perception of time
- SARS-CoV-2 Kappa variant, one of the variants of SARS-CoV-2, the virus that causes COVID-19

== See also ==
- Honda Capa, a car sold in Japan
- Kalpa (aeon)
- Kapa (disambiguation)
- κ-opioid receptor
- Kappaphycus alvarezii, a type of seaweed
