= Nanano =

- Location within Burkina Faso
- Coordinates: 11°32′N 2°44′W
- Country: Burkina Faso
- Region: Boucle du Mouhoun Region
- Province: Balé Province
- Department: Fara Department

Population (2019)
  - Total: 2,201
- Time zone: UTC+0 (GMT)

Nanano is a town in the Fara Department of Balé Province in southern Burkina Faso.

Population
Year	Pop.	±%
1985	1,420	—
2006	2,162	+52.3%
2019	2,201	+1.8%
