= Nabou-nouni =

Nabou-nouni Nabou-nouna
- Interactive map of Nabou-nouni
- Country: Burkina Faso
- Region: Boucle du Mouhoun Region
- Province: Balé Province
- Department: Fara Department

Population (2019)
  - Total: 1,579
- Time zone: UTC+0 (GMT)

Nabou-nouni is a town in the Fara Department of Balé Province in southern Burkina Faso.

Population
Year	Pop.	±%
1985	1,646	—
2006	1,902	+15.6%
2019	1,579	−17.0%
