= Bouzourou =

Village in Balé Province, Burkina Faso

- Location within Burkina Faso
- Coordinates: 11°23′N 2°41′W
- Country: Burkina Faso
- Region: Boucle du Mouhoun Region
- Province: Balé Province
- Department: Fara Department

Population (2019)
  - Total: 1,619
- Time zone: UTC+0 (GMT)

Bouzourou is a village in the Fara Department of Balé Province in southern Burkina Faso.

Population
Year	Pop.	±%
1985	544	—
2006	2,636	+384.6%
2019	1,619	−38.6%
