= Nasma =

- Country: Burkina Faso
- Region: Boucle du Mouhoun Region
- Province: Balé Province
- Department: Fara Department

Population (2019)
  - Total: 1,056
- Time zone: UTC+0 (GMT)

Nasma is a village in the Fara Department of Balé Province in southern Burkina Faso.

Population
Year	Pop.	±%
1985	126	—
2006	409	+224.6%
2019	1,056	+158.2%
