= Pomain =

- Country: Burkina Faso
- Region: Boucle du Mouhoun Region
- Province: Balé Province
- Department: Fara Department

Population (2019)
  - Total: 1,800
- Time zone: UTC+0 (GMT)

Pomain is a town in the Fara Department of Balé Province in southern Burkina Faso.

Population
Year	Pop.	±%
1985	740	—
2006	1,742	+135.4%
2019	1,800	+3.3%
