= Koti Department =

Coordinates: 11°24′N 3°03′W

Koti
- Department
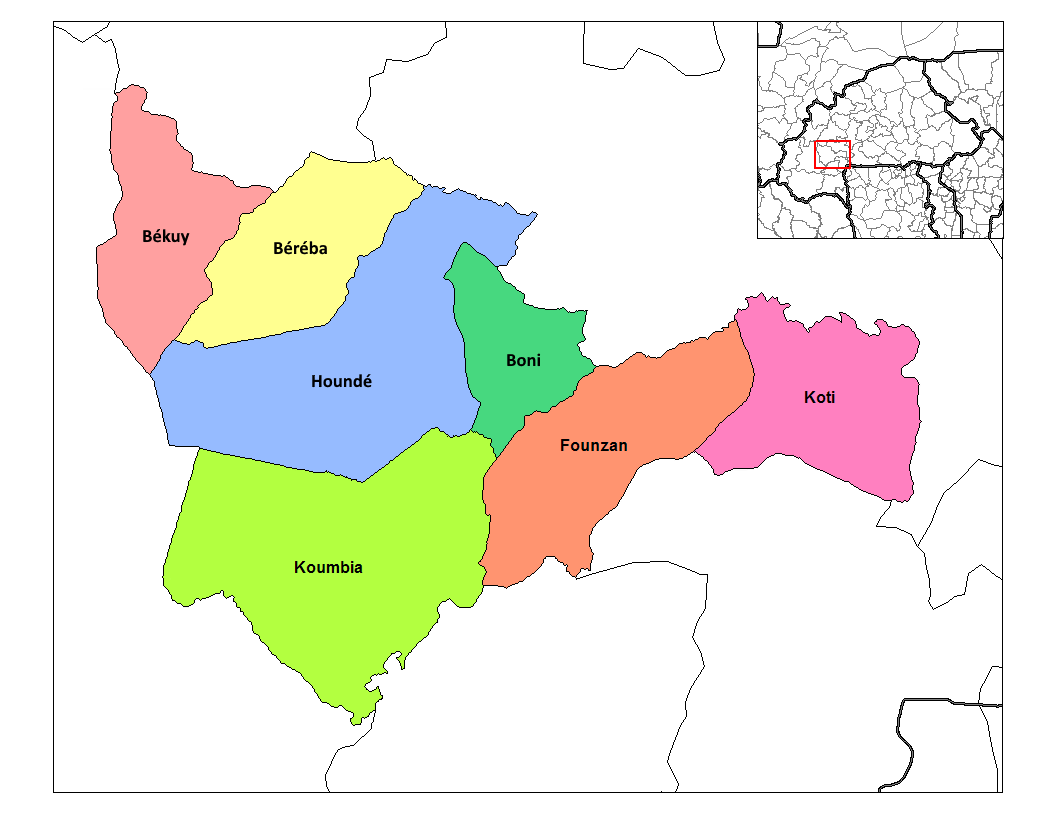
- Koti Department location in the province
- Country: Burkina Faso
- Province: Tuy Province

Area
  - Total: 260.4 sq mi (674.4 km^{2})

Population (2019 census)
  - Total: 31,179
  - Density: 119.7/sq mi (46.23/km^{2})
- Time zone: UTC+0 (GMT 0)

Koti is a department or commune of Tuy Province in southern Burkina Faso. Its capital lies at the town of Koti.
