= Tialla =

- Country: Burkina Faso
- Region: Boucle du Mouhoun Region
- Province: Balé Province
- Department: Fara Department

Population (2019)
  - Total: 1,005
- Time zone: UTC+0 (GMT)

Tialla is a village in the Fara Department of Balé Province in southern Burkina Faso.

Population
| Year | Pop. | ±% |
|---|---|---|
| 1985 | 644 | — |
| 2006 | 790 | +22.7% |
| 2019 | 1,005 | +27.2% |
