= Nabou-peulh =

- Country: Burkina Faso
- Region: Boucle du Mouhoun Region
- Province: Balé Province
- Department: Fara Department

Population (2019)
  - Total: 881
- Time zone: UTC+0 (GMT)

Nabou-peulh is a village in the Fara Department of Balé Province in southern Burkina Faso.

Population
Year	Pop.	±%
2006	418	—
2019	881	+110.8%
