= Toné =

- Location within Burkina Faso
- Coordinates: 11°23′N 2°47′W
- Country: Burkina Faso
- Region: Boucle du Mouhoun Region
- Province: Balé Province
- Department: Fara Department

Population (2019)
  - Total: 4,177
- Time zone: UTC+0 (GMT)

Toné is a town in the Fara Department of Balé Province in southern Burkina Faso.

Population
Year	Pop.	±%
1985	1,415	—
2006	2,698	+90.7%
2019	4,177	+54.8%
