= Laro, Burkina Faso =

Laro
- Location within Burkina Faso
- Coordinates: 11°17′N 2°50′W
- Country: Burkina Faso
- Region: Boucle du Mouhoun Region
- Province: Balé Province
- Department: Fara Department

Population (2019)
  - Total: 4,138
- Time zone: UTC+0 (GMT)

Laro is a town in the Fara Department of Balé Province in southern Burkina Faso.

Population
Year	Pop.	±%
1985	1,306	—
2006	3,047	+133.3%
2019	4,138	+35.8%
