= Koumbia, Tuy, Burkina Faso =

Koumbia, Tuy
- Town
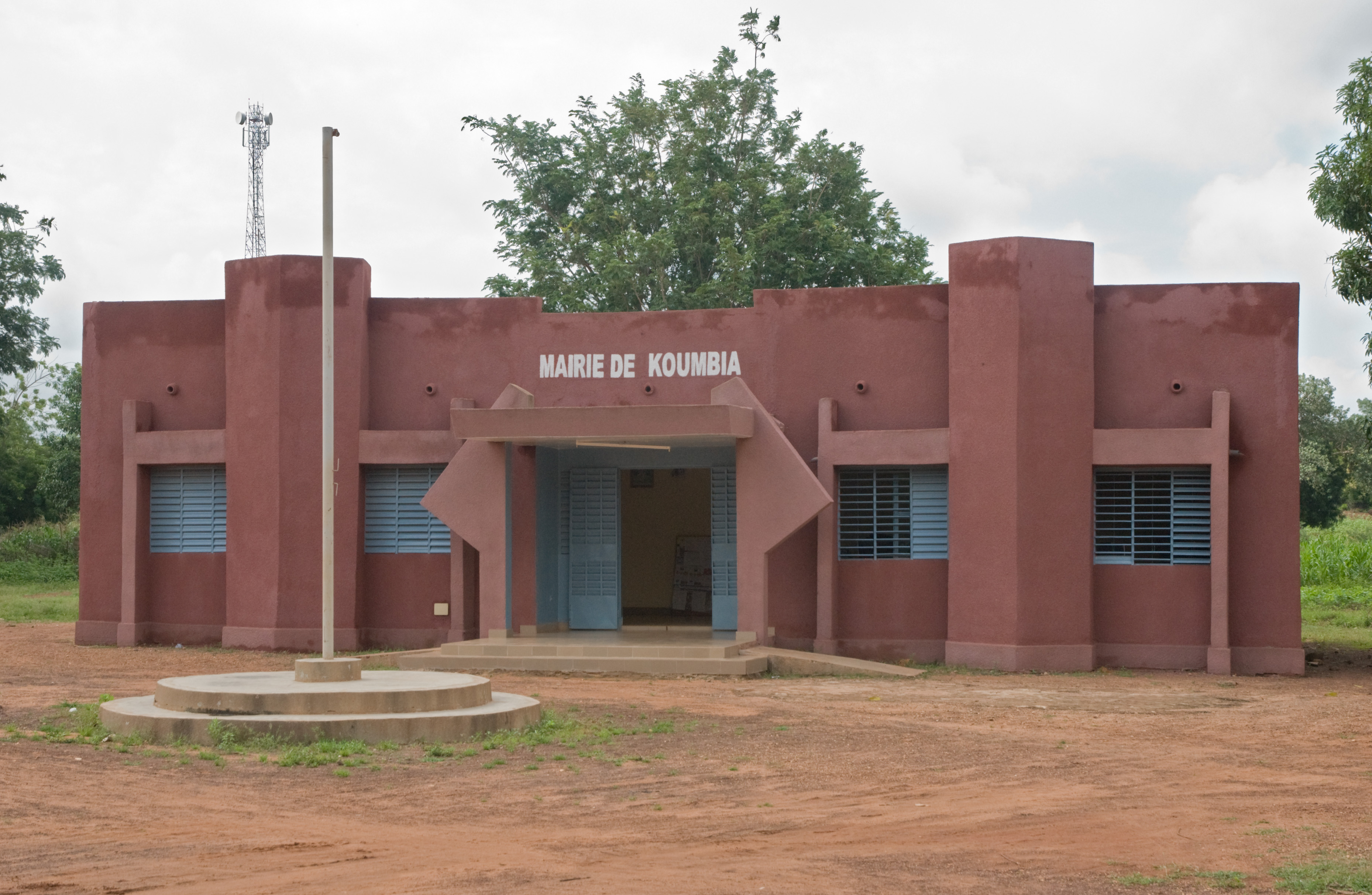
- Municipal administration building (August 2017)

- Location within Burkina Faso
- Coordinates: 11.226898°N 3.713379°W
- Country: Burkina Faso
- Region: Hauts-Bassins
- Province: Tuy
- Department: Koumbia
- Time zone: UTC+0 (GMT)

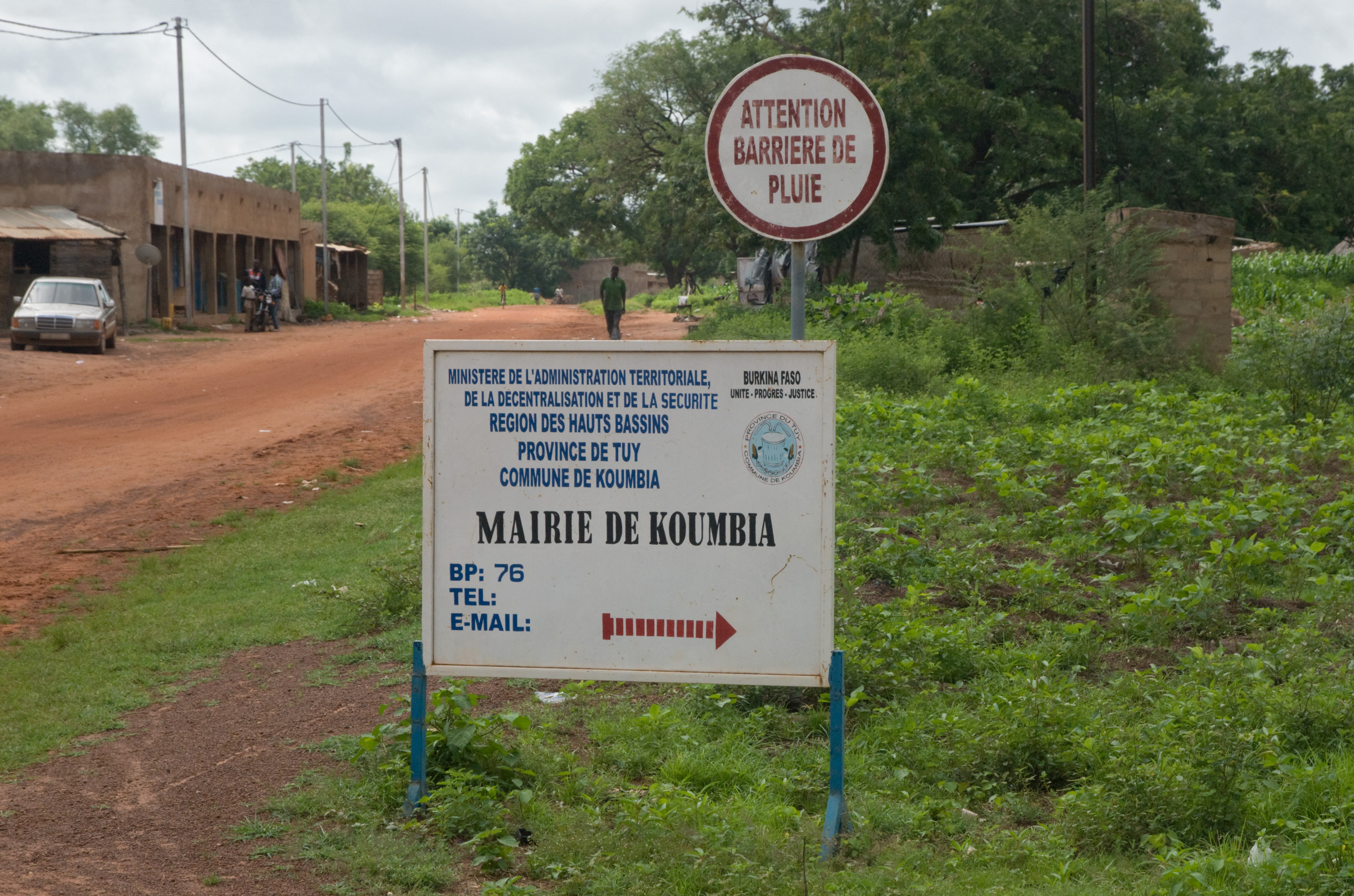
Street in Koumbia town with sign pointing to the municipal administration building (August 2017)

Koumbia is a town in southwestern Burkina Faso, capital of the rural municipality (commune rurale) and Department of Koumbia in Tuy Province (Hauts-Bassins Region). It is situated about 70 km east of Bobo-Dioulasso along the trunk road Route nationale N1 to Ouagadougou where the Route régionale R25 joins the N1.

This town should not be confused with the much smaller village of Koumbia in Fara Department of Balé Province (Boucle du Mouhoun Region)
