= Dakayes =

- Location within Burkina Faso
- Coordinates: 11°29′N 2°44′W
- Country: Burkina Faso
- Region: Boucle du Mouhoun Region
- Province: Balé Province
- Department: Fara Department

Population (2019)
  - Total: 1,170
- Time zone: UTC+0 (GMT)

Dakayes is a village in the Fara Department of Balé Province in southern Burkina Faso.

Population
Year	Pop.	±%
2006	1,630	—
2019	1,170	−28.2%
