= Konzena =

- Location within Burkina Faso
- Coordinates: 11°33′N 2°42′W
- Country: Burkina Faso
- Region: Boucle du Mouhoun Region
- Province: Balé Province
- Department: Fara Department

Population (2019)
  - Total: 468
- Time zone: UTC+0 (GMT)

Konzena is a village in the Fara Department of Balé Province in southern Burkina Faso.

Population
Year	Pop.	±%
1985	187	—
2006	360	+92.5%
2019	468	+30.0%
