= Honda Logo =

Honda Logo (GA3/5)
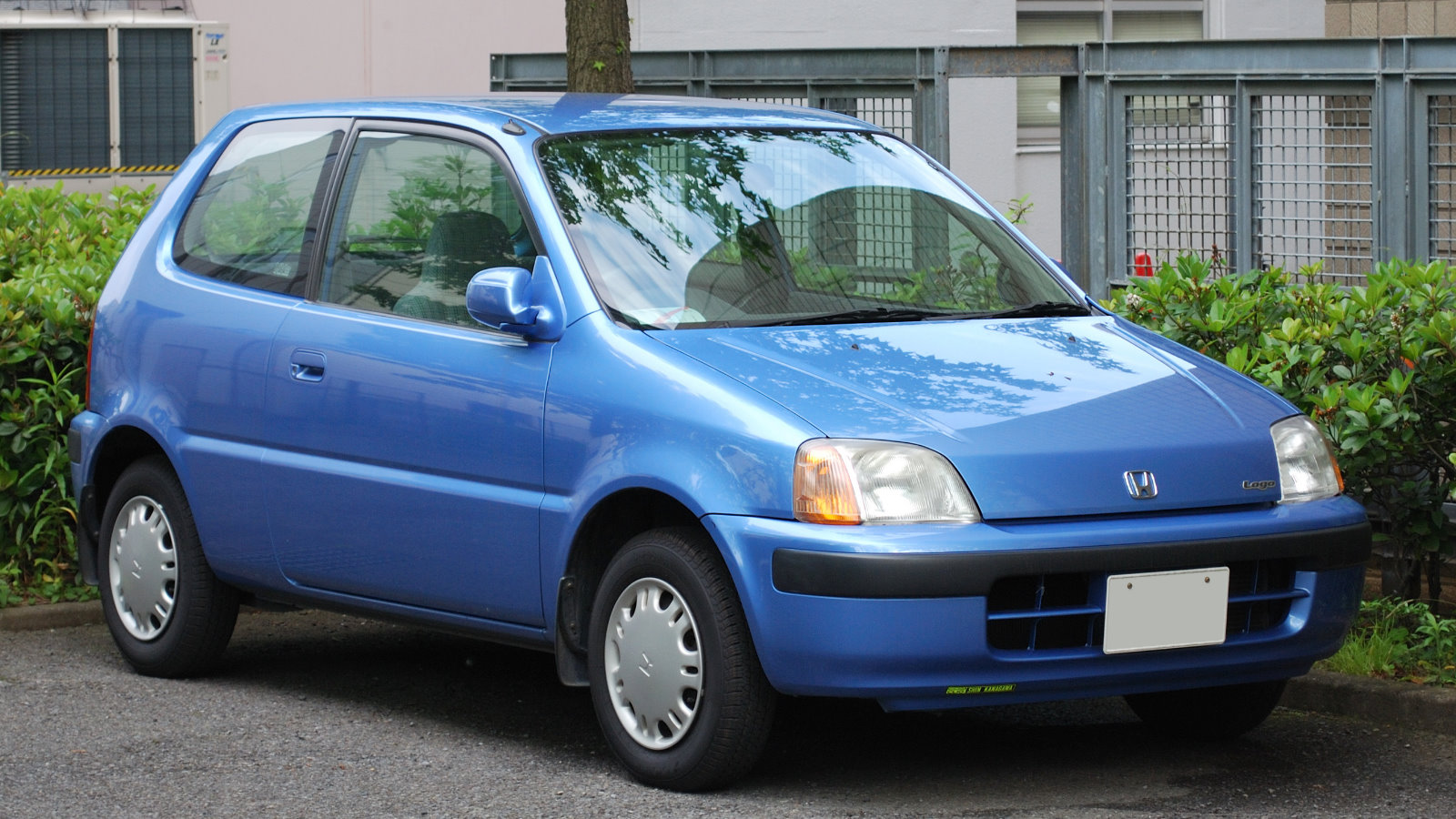
- Honda Logo (pre-facelift)

Overview
- Manufacturer: Honda
- Production: 1996–2001
- Assembly: Japan: Suzuka, Mie

Body and chassis
- Class: Supermini
- Body style: 3/5-door hatchback
- Layout: Front-engine, front-wheel-drive (GA3); Front engine, four-wheel-drive (GA5)
- Related: Honda HR-V; Honda Capa; Honda EV Plus

Powertrain
- Engine: 1343 cc D13B SOHC I4
- Transmission: 3-speed automatic 5-speed manual CVT

Dimensions
- Wheelbase: 2,360 mm (92.9 in)
- Length: 3,750 mm (147.6 in) (Japanese launch models); 3,784 mm (149.0 in) (Europe)
- Width: 1,645 mm (64.8 in)
- Height: 1,490–1,525 mm (58.7–60.0 in) (Japan); 1,529 mm (60.2 in) (Europe)
- Kerb weight: 790–890 kg (1,742–1,962 lb) (Japanese launch models); 913–990 kg (2,013–2,183 lb) (Europe); 1,040 kg (2,293 lb) (late 4WD)

Chronology
- Predecessor: Honda City (series GA1-GA2)
- Successor: Honda Fit

The Honda Logo is a supermini car (B-segment) which was made by Honda from 1996 to 2001. It is a three- or five-door hatchback that replaced the second-generation City and was then superseded by the Fit/Jazz. It slotted between the smaller kei-class Life and the larger Civic in Honda's range of the era. The Honda Capa and Honda HR-V were developed from the Logo's platform.

The Logo was manufactured in Japan and assembled at Honda's factory in Suzuka, Mie. It was marketed in Japan through dealerships of Honda Clio from 1996 to 2001, and briefly in Europe between 1999 and 2001.

== Mechanicals ==
The Logo uses the D13B, a single-cam inline-four engine. The Logo's fuel injected engine has two valves per cylinder, aside from the later, sporting TS version and its derivatives which have four valves per cylinder. A CVT transmission was offered. The 1.3-litre (1,343 cc) engine provided 66 PS (49 kW; 65 hp). Using lessons learned on the CRX HF economy models, the engine was designed to be fuel efficient and to provide maximum torque low in the range, with maximum torque coming in at 2,500 rpm. 90 percent of the torque was available at 1,300 rpm, just above idling speed. A higher-revving, sixteen-valve version of the SOHC D13B engine was later introduced for the sporting "TS" model. This version produces 91 PS (67 kW; 90 hp) at 6,300 rpm and 11.6 kg⋅m (114 N⋅m; 84 lb⋅ft) at 4,800 rpm. The TS also received various sporting additions such as a leather, three-spoke steering wheel, suspension lowered by 10 mm (0.39 in), and front and rear stabilizer bars.

Transmissions included a five-speed manual transmission, three-speed automatic transmission, and the CVT, marketed as Honda Multimatic. The CVT was reserved for better equipped versions and was also the only transmission offered on the 4WD model. In November 1998, the CVT system was renamed the Multimatic S to reflect the addition of Honda's Grade Logic Control system ("Prosmatec"), which senses when the car is travelling up or down a hill and keeps it in the according, correct ratio.

== Sales ==
In Japan, the Logo succeeded the second generation series of Honda City, the GA1/2. Two derivative models used the Logo's platform and components: the Honda Capa and the first-generation Honda HR-V, whose marketing had more emphasis on a youthful approach. The Logo was intended to be practical and economical; however, its conservative design and modest overall intent were reflected in the marketplace, with the car not selling as well as hoped and remaining a single generation model. In just under five years, cumulative sales in the Japanese domestic market totalled 202,601 examples.

In Europe, sales were not particularly strong, but the car did come top of a customer satisfaction survey in December 2001. Sales in left-hand drive continental European markets started after the facelift, in September 1999. The somewhat dated model was only available in a three-door variant with a 65 PS (48 kW; 64 hp) version of the 1.3-litre engine. In the United Kingdom, the Logo went on sale in the latter half of 2000 and was available for the very short period of nine months. In Europe, the Logo was treated as a placeholder model, to establish a toehold in the supermini category prior to the coming introduction of the Jazz.

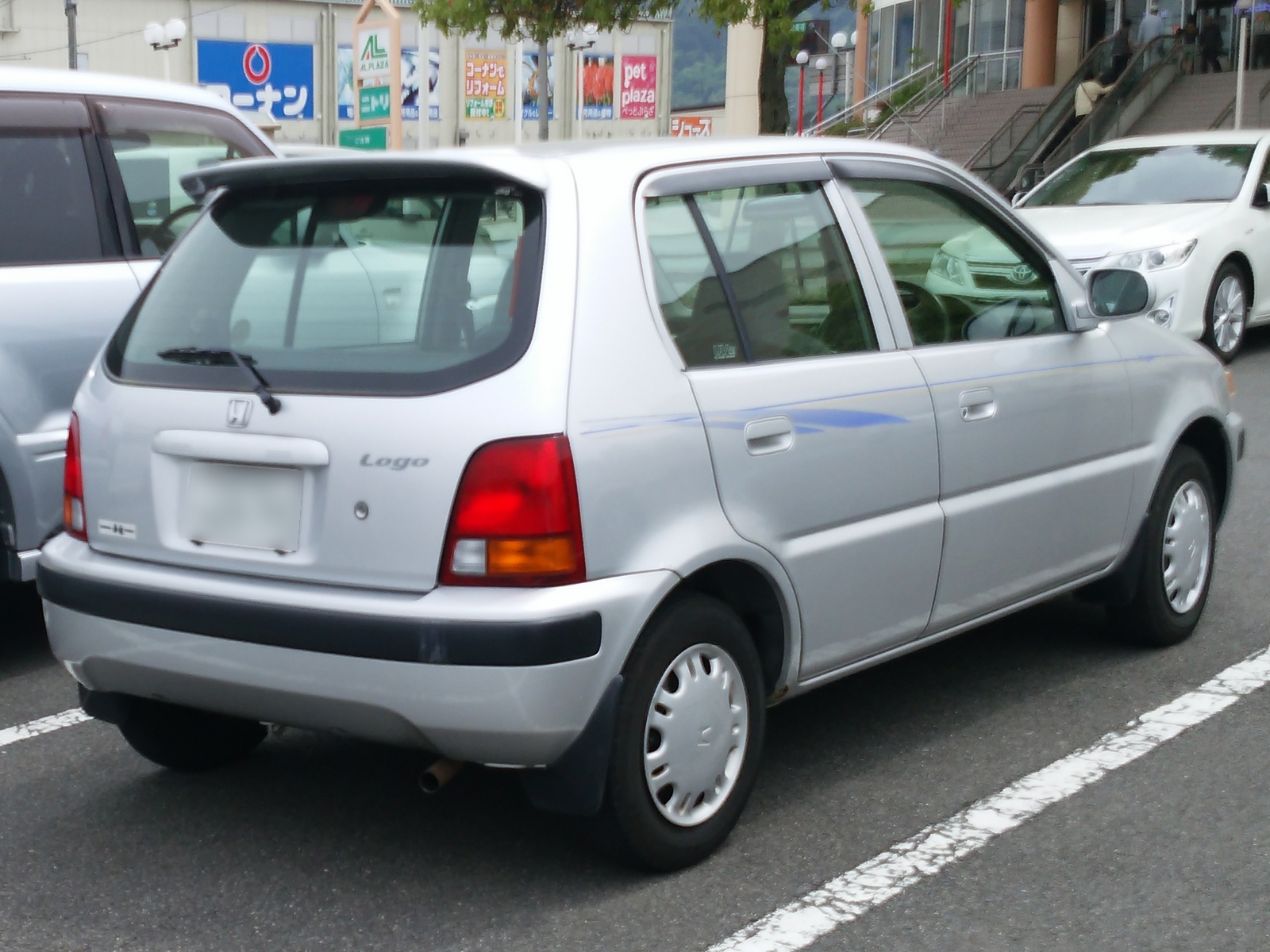
Rear (pre-facelift)

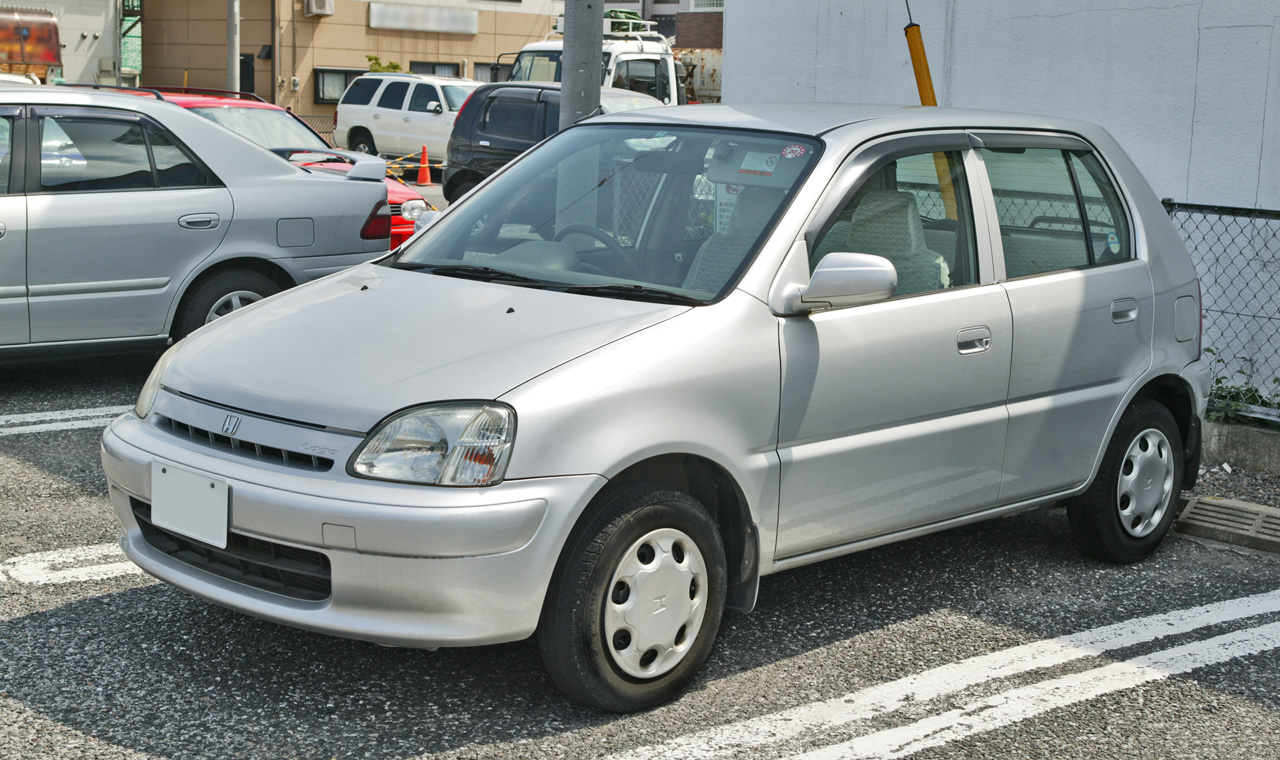
First facelift

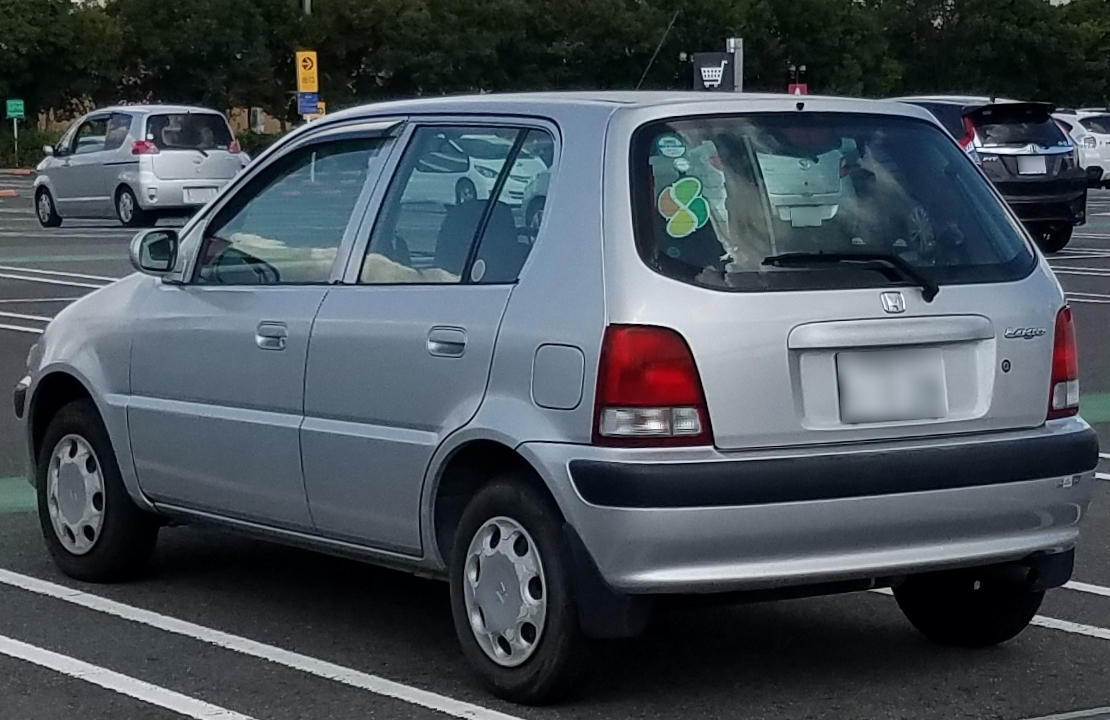
First facelift

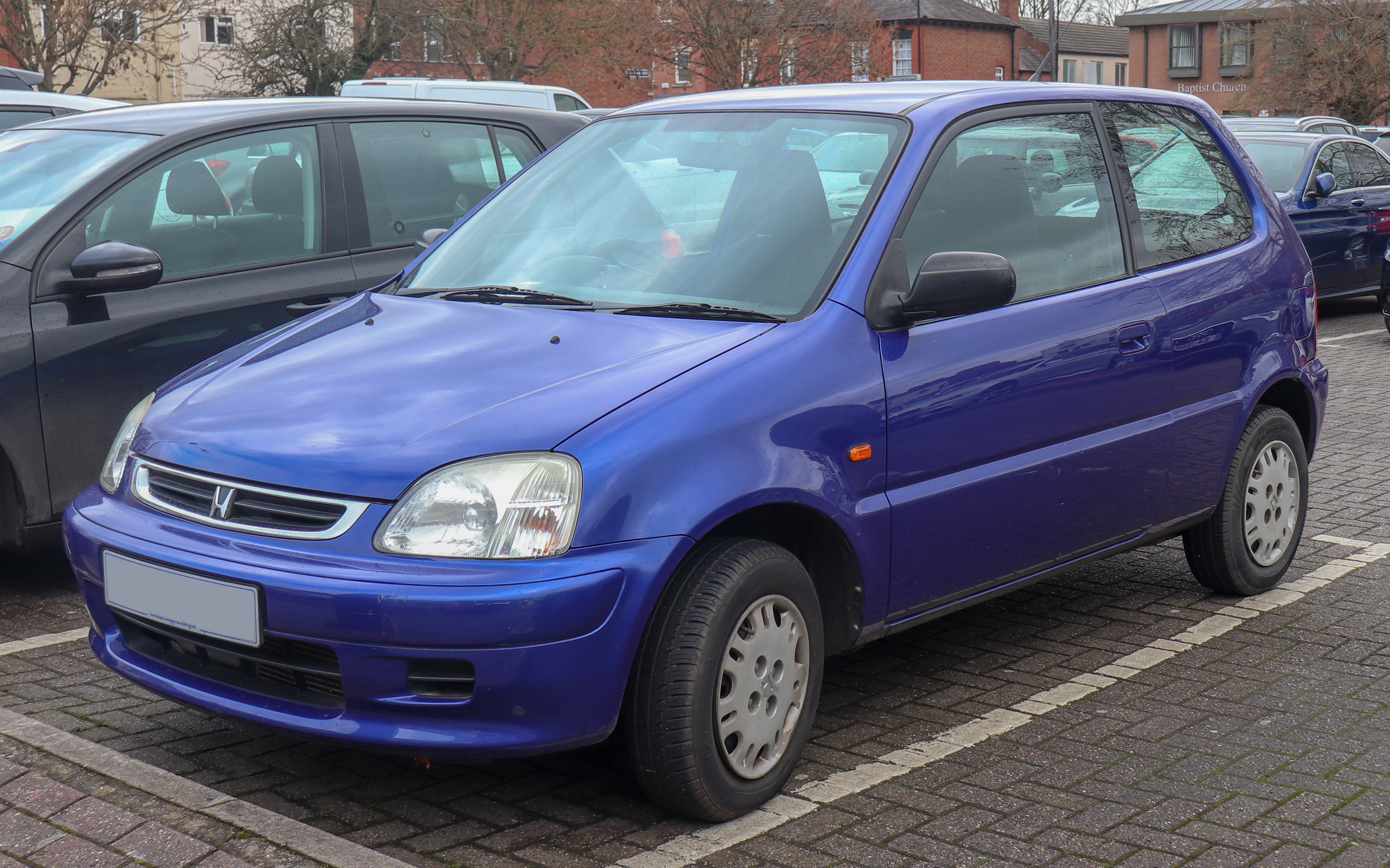
Second facelift

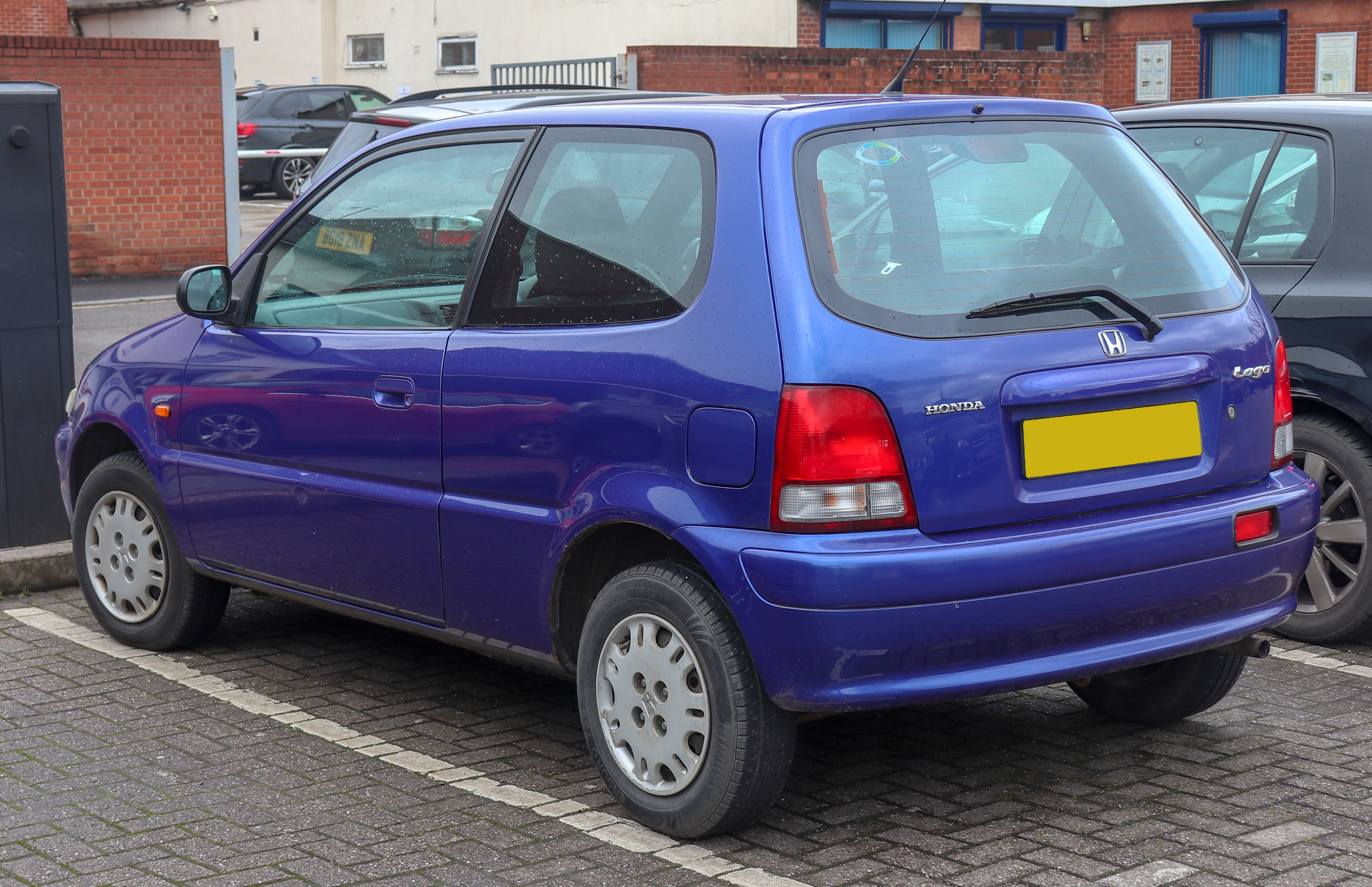
Second facelift

== Reception ==
The Logo received a negative review from What Car?, who criticised its ride, handling, and build quality. The RAC found the Logo to be well equipped, but noted that it was already out of date compared to other supermini-class cars by the time it went on sale in the UK. Parker's Car Guides found the interior to be "cheap and nasty" and criticised the noise, vibration, and harshness, but noted the "good forward visibility".

Japanese and German reviewers also criticized the car for being outdated and of an anodyne design.

== Safety ==
Euro NCAP crash tested a left-hand-drive three-door Logo in 2000, giving it three-out-of-five stars for adult occupant safety, with an overall score of 17 (six in the frontal impact test and 11 in the side impact test). It received two-out-of-four stars in Euro NCAP's pedestrian impact test, with a score of 14.

== Chronology ==
- 3 October 1996: The Logo was announced as the successor to the Honda City. It was marketed in Japan with the slogan "human sizing".
- 4 October 1996: The three-door Logo goes on sale.
- 1 November 1996: The five-door version goes on sale.
- 12 September 1997: Minor changes were made, with all trim levels receiving an antimicrobial steering wheel and the option to upgrade the "G" trim to the "G-allfa" special model; at a small premium, this offered standard anti-lock brakes (ABS) and a passenger-side airbag. A version with adapted controls for disabled people called the "Logo Almas" was also launched.
- 4 January 1998: The "Lachic", a special edition model with body-coloured bumpers, ABS, and a passenger-side airbag went on sale.
- 19 March 1998: Another adapted variant was released, with a swiveling passenger seat and a mount for carrying wheelchairs.
- 23 April 1998: The Honda Capa, developed from the Logo, was launched.
- 22 September 1998: The three-door Honda HR-V was launched, which was derived from the Logo.
- 12 November 1998: A minor change was made to the model to comply with new automobile exhaust gas regulations. The model code added a leading "GF" to reflect the changes. The monocoque was stiffened to improve crashworthiness, requiring considerable revisions under the skin. The sporty "TS" trim with a more powerful 16-valve engine was introduced, and Real Time four-wheel-drive became available (only offered with Honda's Multimatic S CVT transmission).
- September 1999: The Sportic special edition was introduced, a better-equipped version of the sporty TS variant; it was also available in an exclusive colour called Super Sonic Blue Pearl.
  - Sales started in Continental Europe; only a single, three-door version was available.
- 16 December 1999: The Coloris, a special-edition model based on the G-type model was introduced. This was fully body-coloured, including bumpers, grille, door handles, etcetera. All colors were available, with the addition of the special colour Crystal Silver Metallic.
- 14 April 2000: The Logo received a second, minor facelift and changes were made to the interior. An additional series of lower-cost Sportic models based on the G-type were added to the Japanese model line; the earlier Sportic became the Sportic TS as a result.
- 12 May 2000: The refreshed "Logo Almas" line of motability and nursing cars went on sale.
- mid-2000: Sales started in the United Kingdom, also only as a three-door model.
- 30 November 2000: A new special model, the "Topics" was added. Based on the G model, it added a keyless entry system, a height-adjustable driver's seat (separate front and rear adjustment), and electrically retractable, body-coloured power door mirrors.
- June 2001: The Logo is discontinued and its successor, the Honda Fit, is launched.

== See also ==
- Honda Capa
