= Sadon-bobo =

- Location within Burkina Faso
- Coordinates: 11°22′N 2°48′W
- Country: Burkina Faso
- Region: Boucle du Mouhoun Region
- Province: Balé Province
- Department: Fara Department

Population (2019)
  - Total: 1,848
- Time zone: UTC+0 (GMT)

Sadon-bobo is a town in the Fara Department of Balé Province in southern Burkina Faso.

Population
Year	Pop.	±%
1985	569	—
2006	1,322	+132.3%
2019	1,848	+39.8%
