= Béréba Department =

Coordinates: 11°38′N 4°41′W

Béréba
- Department
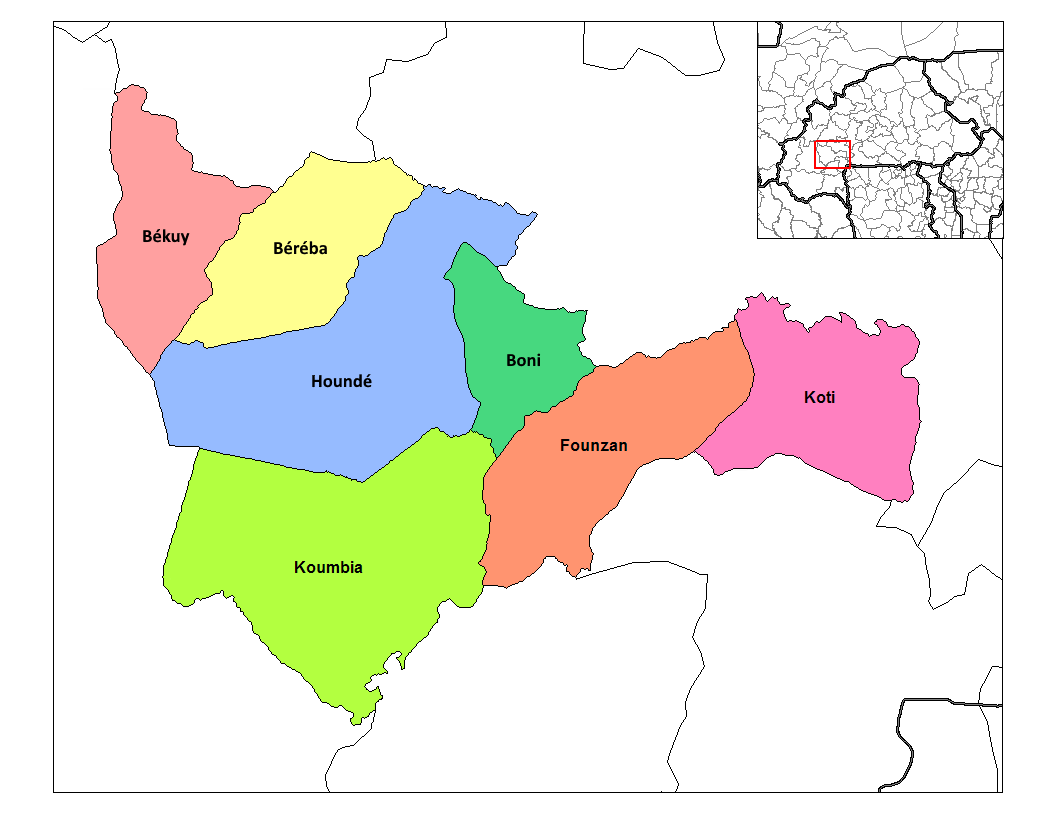
- Béréba Department location in the province
- Country: Burkina Faso
- Province: Tuy Province

Area
  - Total: 227.0 sq mi (588.0 km^{2})

Population (2019 census)
  - Total: 31,264
  - Density: 137.7/sq mi (53.17/km^{2})
- Time zone: UTC+0 (GMT 0)

Béréba is a department or commune of Tuy Province in southern Burkina Faso. Its capital lies at the town of Béréba.
