= Founzan Department =

Coordinates: 11°27′N 3°14′W

Founzan
- Department
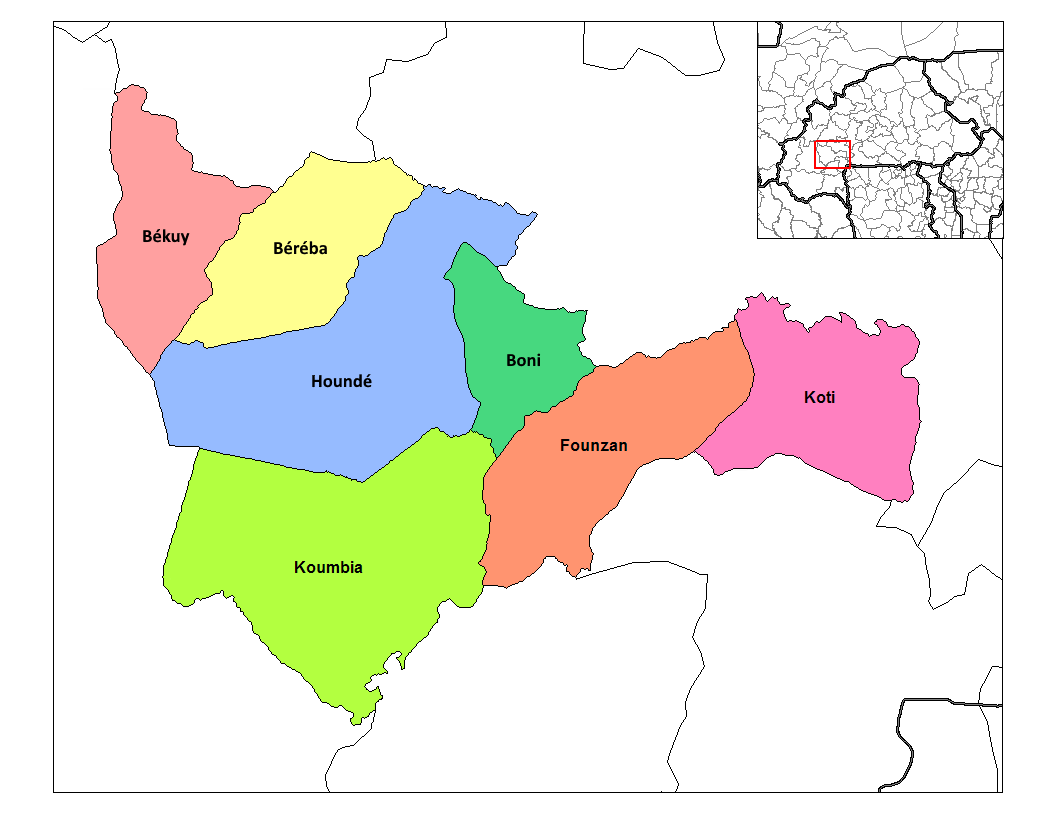
- Founzan Department location in the province
- Country: Burkina Faso
- Province: Tuy Province
- Time zone: UTC+0 (GMT 0)

Founzan is a department or commune of Tuy Province in southern Burkina Faso. Its capital lies at the town of Founzan.
