= Naouya =

- Country: Burkina Faso
- Region: Boucle du Mouhoun Region
- Province: Balé Province
- Department: Fara Department

Population (2019)
  - Total: 2,049
- Time zone: UTC+0 (GMT)

Naouya is a town in the Fara Department of Balé Province in southern Burkina Faso.

Population
Year	Pop.	±%
1985	502	—
2006	1,291	+157.2%
2019	2,049	+58.7%
