= Lionel Bilgo =

Burkinabe economist, political analyst, and writer

Minister of National Education, Literacy and Promotion of National Languages
- In office March 5, 2022 – October 21, 2022
- President: Paul-Henri Sandaogo Damiba
- Preceded by: Stanislas Ouaro
- Succeeded by: Joseph André Ouedraogo

Personal details
- Born: Lionel Joel I Wendkouni Bilgo; October 21, 1981 (age 44)

Lionel Joel I Wendkouni Bilgo is a Burkinabe economist, political analyst, and writer who served as the Minister of Education of Burkina Faso during the Patriotic Movement for Safeguard and Restoration government.

== Biography ==
Bilgo was born on October 21, 1981, in Ouagadougou, Burkina Faso. Bilgo graduated from the ESCP Business School in Paris, France. He gained prominence for his pro-government poetry and statements supporting the Burkina Faso Armed Forces and Volunteers for the Defense of the Homeland (VDP) during the Jihadist insurgency in Burkina Faso. Bilgo is also the head of the African Golden Association for African Renewal, where he hosts debates with Burkinabe and Malian politicians such as Abdoulaye Ly, Mélégué Traoré, and Aminata Traoré Bagayoko.

Bilgo was appointed as the Minister of National Education on March 5, 2022, following the January 2022 Burkina Faso coup d'état. During his time as the Minister of Education, he also served as a government spokesman. As Minister of Education, his main focus was promoting nationalism among Burkinabe youth and connecting them with historical Burkinabe figures. Bilgo was ousted from his position on October 21, 2022.
