= Nasséné =

- Country: Burkina Faso
- Region: Boucle du Mouhoun Region
- Province: Balé Province
- Department: Fara Department

Population (2019)
  - Total: 1,665
- Time zone: UTC+0 (GMT)

Nasséné is a village in the Fara Department of Balé Province in southern Burkina Faso.

Population
Year	Pop.	±%
1985	215	—
2006	797	+270.7%
2019	1,665	+108.9%
