= Diansi =

- Country: Burkina Faso
- Region: Boucle du Mouhoun Region
- Province: Balé Province
- Department: Fara Department

Population (2019)
  - Total: 357
- Time zone: UTC+0 (GMT)

Diansi is a village in the Fara Department of Balé Province in southern Burkina Faso.

Population
Year	Pop.	±%
1985	111	—
2006	1,524	+1273.0%
2019	357	−76.6%
