= Fitien =

- Location within Burkina Faso
- Coordinates: 11°28′N 2°40′W
- Country: Burkina Faso
- Region: Boucle du Mouhoun Region
- Province: Balé Province
- Department: Fara Department

Population (2019)
  - Total: 930
- Time zone: UTC+0 (GMT)

Fitien is a village in the Fara Department of Balé Province in southern Burkina Faso.

Population
Year	Pop.	±%
1985	291	—
2006	640	+119.9%
2019	930	+45.3%
