= Oumarou Idani =

Burkinabé politician

Minister of Mines and Quarries
- Incumbent
- Assumed office 20 February 2017
- Preceded by: Alpha Oumar Dissa (Minister of Energy, Mines and Quarries)

Personal details
- Party: People's Movement for Progress

Oumarou Idani is a Burkinabé politician. He is the Minister of Mines and Quarries since 20 February 2017.

== Biography ==
Oumarou Idani graduated from the Interstates School for Rural Equipment Engineers in 1981. In 1991, he received postgraduate diploma from Financial, Economics and Banking Studies Centre of Paris.

On 20 February 2017, Idani was appointed Minister of Mines and Quarries by the Prime Minister Thieba. He remained in the position in Dabiré cabinet.

== Health ==
During the 2020 coronavirus outbreak, on 21 March, Idani contracted the coronavirus.
