= Békuy Department =

Coordinates: 11°38′N 3°53′W

Békuy
- Department
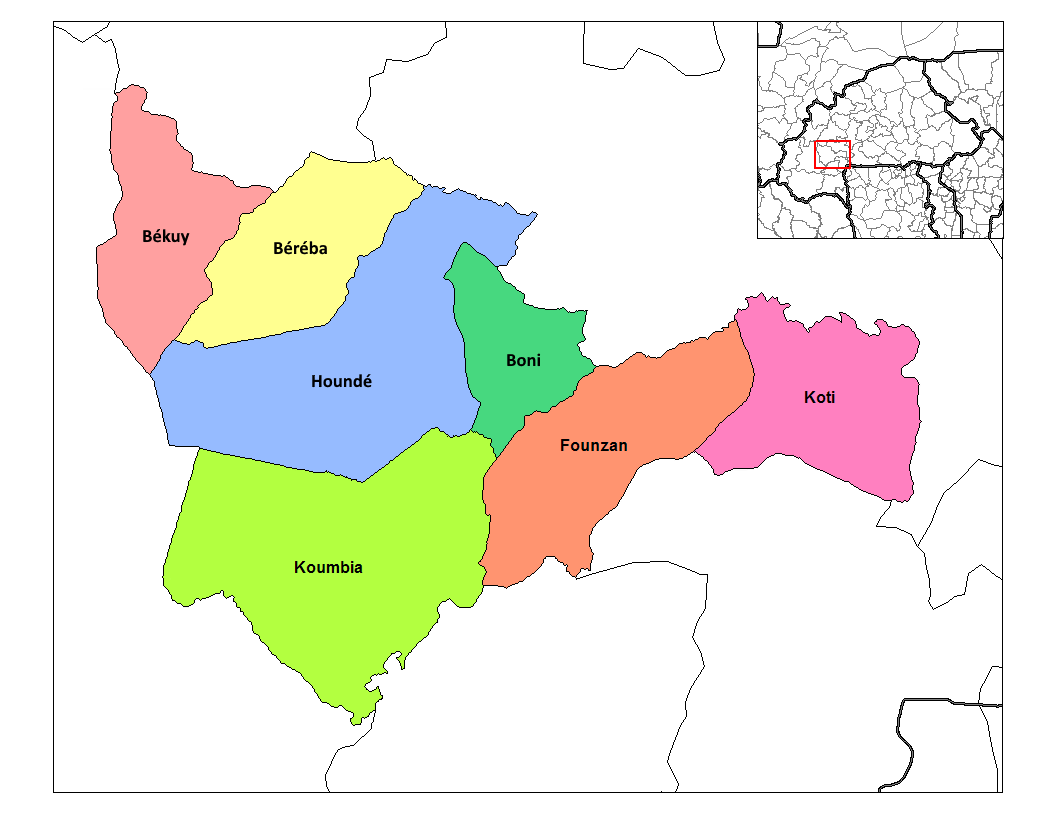
- Békuy Department location in the province
- Country: Burkina Faso
- Province: Tuy Province

Area
  - Total: 224.6 sq mi (581.8 km^{2})

Population (2019 census)
  - Total: 19,216
  - Density: 85.54/sq mi (33.03/km^{2})
- Time zone: UTC+0 (GMT 0)

Békuy is a department or commune of Tuy Province in southern Burkina Faso. Its capital lies at the town of Békuy.
