= Kapa (disambiguation) =

Kapa is a fabric that was made by Native Hawaiians.

KAPA is a radio station in Hilo, Hawaii, United States.

Kapa or KAPA may also refer to:

- Kapa, Burkina Faso, a village in the Fara Department of Balé Province in southern Burkina Faso
- Centennial Airport, public use airport in Arapahoe County, Colorado, United States
- Käpylän Pallo, a football (soccer) club from the Käpylä district of Helsinki
- the Crnogorska kapa, worn in Montenegro
- Kapa haka, a traditional Maori arts festival, centred around the performance of haka and related dance

== People ==
- Eparaima Te Mutu Kapa (1842–1925), Māori member of the New Zealand parliament
- Mutu Kapa (1870–1968), New Zealand tribal leader, sportsman, Anglican priest

== Other ==
- Kapa investment scam, an alleged scam that occurred in the Philippines in June 2019

== See also ==
- Kaja (name)
- Kappa (disambiguation)
