= Bilatio =

- Location within Burkina Faso
- Coordinates: 11°23′N 02°39′W
- Country: Burkina Faso
- Region: Boucle du Mouhoun Region
- Province: Balé Province
- Department: Fara Department

Population (2019)
  - Total: 570
- Time zone: UTC+0 (GMT)

Bilatio is a village in the Fara Department of Balé Province in southern Burkina Faso.

Population
Year	Pop.	±%
1985	137	—
2006	1,012	+638.7%
2019	570	−43.7%
