= Stanislas Ouaro =

Burkinabé politician and mathematician

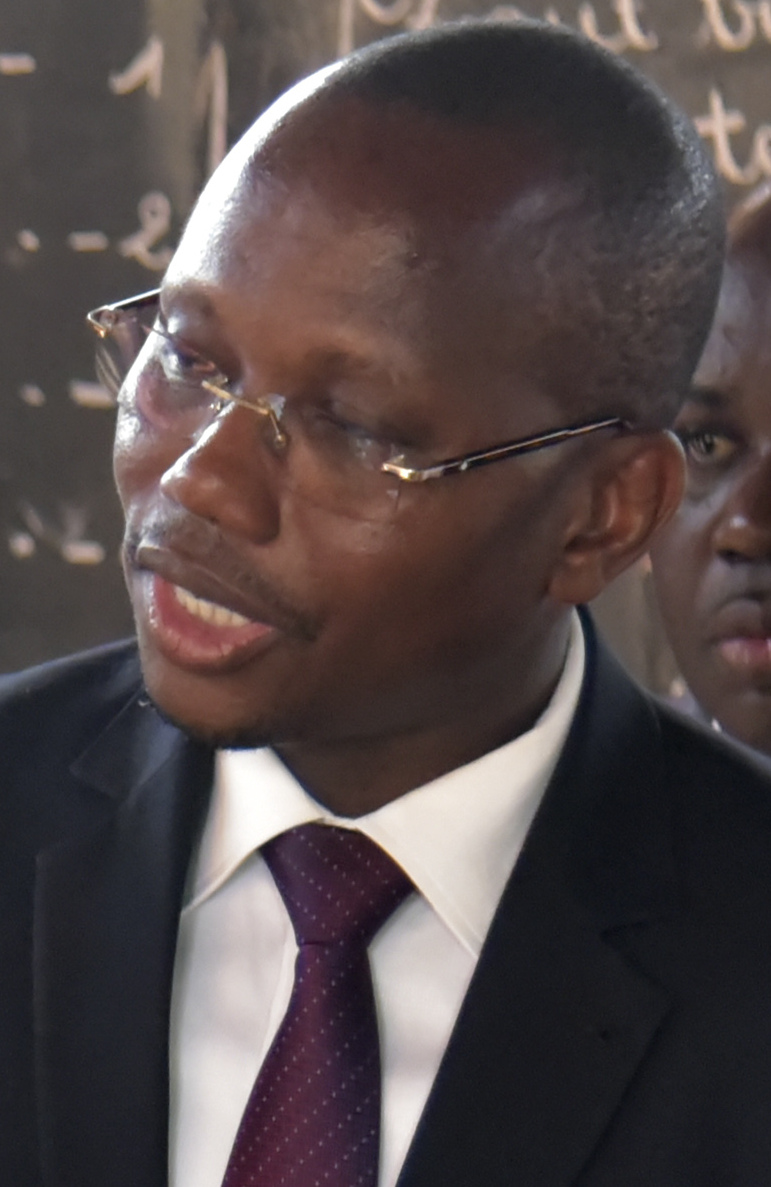

Minister of National Education and Literacy
- In office 31 January 2018 – 19 January 2019
- Preceded by: Jean-Martin Coulibaly
- Succeeded by: Position abolished

Minister of National Education, Literacy and Promotion of National Languages
- In office 24 January 2019 – March 5, 2022
- Preceded by: Position established
- Succeeded by: Lionel Bilgo

Personal details
- Born: 19 January 1975 (age 51) Bobo-Dioulasso, Burkina Faso
- Education: University of Ouagadougou

Stanislas Ouaro (born 19 January 1975) is a Burkinabé politician and mathematician.

== Biography ==
Stanislas Ouaro was born on 19 January 1975. He graduated with a doctor's degree from University of Ouagadougou in 2001 with his thesis titled Etude de problèmes elliptiques-paraboliques nonlinéaires en une dimension d'espace. Before he joined government, he was the president of University of Ouaga II since 2012.

On 31 January 2018, he was appointed the Minister of National Education and Literacy, replacing Jean-Martin Coulibaly. On 19 January 2019, he resigned together with other members of Thieba cabinet. On 24 January, he was appointed the Minister of National Education, Literacy and Promotion of National Languages.

== Health ==
During the 2020 coronavirus outbreak, on 21 March, Ouaro contracted the coronavirus.
