= Fara, Burkina Faso =

Fara
- Location in Burkina Faso
- Coordinates: 11°32′N 2°46′W
- Country: Burkina Faso
- Region: Boucle du Mouhoun Region
- Province: Balé
- Department: Fara Department

Population (2019 census)
  - Total: 20,434

Fara is a town in the Fara Department of Balé Province in southern Burkina Faso.

Population
Year	Pop.	±%
1985	5,398	—
2006	2,572	−52.4%
2019	20,434	+694.5%
