= Kabourou =

- Location within Burkina Faso
- Coordinates: 11°25′N 2°45′W
- Country: Burkina Faso
- Region: Boucle du Mouhoun Region
- Province: Balé Province
- Department: Fara Department

Population (2019)
  - Total: 4,909
- Time zone: UTC+0 (GMT)

Kabourou is a town in the Fara Department of Balé Province in southern Burkina Faso.

Population
| Year | Pop. | ±% |
|---|---|---|
| 1985 | 2,245 | — |
| 2006 | 3,958 | +76.3% |
| 2019 | 4,909 | +24.0% |
