= COVID-19 vaccination in Burkina Faso =

Plan to immunize against COVID-19

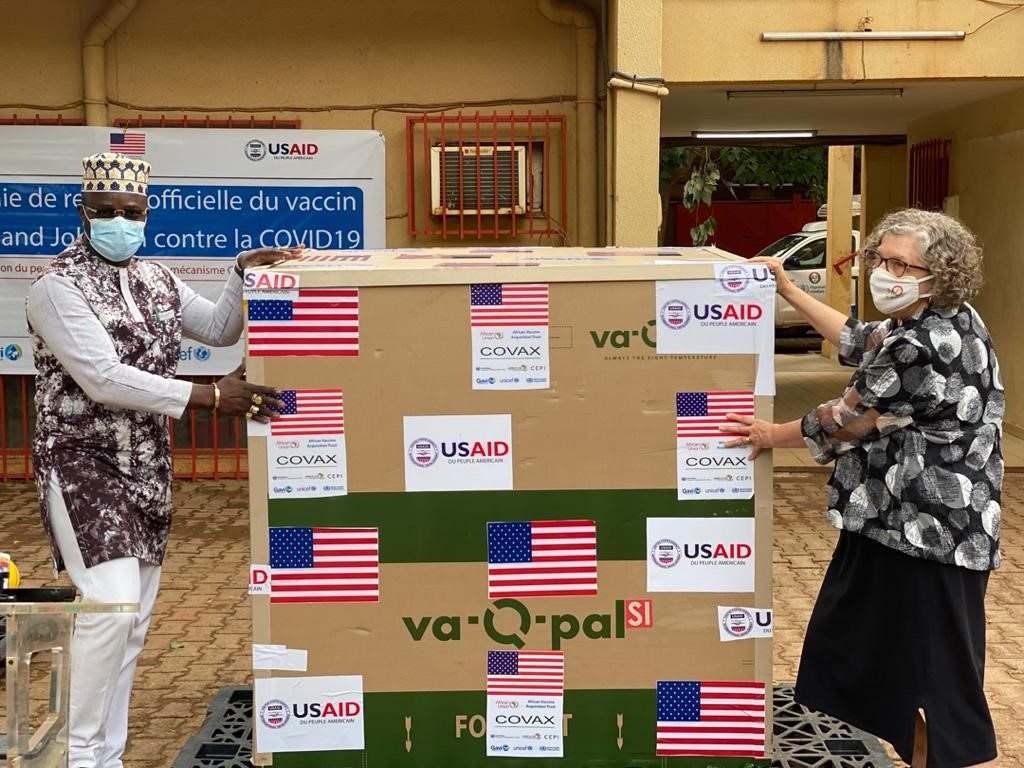
- The US delivers Janssen COVID-19 vaccines as part of the COVAX program in 2021
- Date: June 2, 2021
- Cause: COVID-19 pandemic

Burkina Faso started vaccinating against COVID-19 on 2 June 2021.

== Background ==
=== Vaccines On Order ===
Burkina Faso is in the works of securing additional vaccines.

== History ==
=== Timeline ===
==== March 2021 ====
So far, the health system in Burkina Faso's health system has been under strain with dealing with the pandemic, leaving them unable to focus on vaccinations in the country.

==== May 2021 ====
Burkina Faso received 115,200 doses of the Oxford–AstraZeneca COVID-19 vaccine on 30 May, courtesy of COVAX.

==== June 2021 ====
Vaccinations started on 2 June. By the end of the month 25,833 vaccine doses had been administered.

==== July 2021 ====
In late July and early August, Burkina Faso received 302,400 doses of the Janssen COVID-19 vaccine donated by the United States through COVAX. By the end of the month 35,402 vaccine doses had been administered.

==== August 2021 ====
By the end of the month 98,670 vaccine doses had been administered.

==== September 2021 ====
By the end of the month 254,545 vaccine doses had been administered.

==== October 2021 ====
By the end of the month 393,427 vaccine doses had been administered while 3% of the targeted population had been fully vaccinated.

==== November 2021 ====
By the end of the month 490,477 vaccine doses had been administered while 4% of the targeted population had been fully vaccinated.

==== December 2021 ====
By the end of the month 1.05 million vaccine doses had been administered while 8% of the targeted population had been fully vaccinated.

==== January 2022 ====
By the end of the month 1.3 million vaccine doses had been administered while 9% of the targeted population had been fully vaccinated.

==== February 2022 ====
By the end of the month 2.3 million vaccine doses had been administered while 1.1 million persons had been fully vaccinated.

==== March 2022 ====
By the end of the month 2.4 million vaccine doses had been administered while 1.2 million persons had been fully vaccinated.

==== April 2022 ====
By the end of the month 2.9 million vaccine doses had been administered while 1.5 million persons had been fully vaccinated.

== Progress ==
Cumulative vaccinations

View source data.
