= Kapa, Burkina Faso =

- Location within Burkina Faso
- Coordinates: 11°28′N 2°38′W
- Country: Burkina Faso
- Region: Boucle du Mouhoun Region
- Province: Balé Province
- Department: Fara Department

Population (2019)
  - Total: 535
- Time zone: UTC+0 (GMT)

Kapa is a village in the Fara Department of Balé Province in southern Burkina Faso.

Population
Year	Pop.	±%
1985	134	—
2006	283	+111.2%
2019	535	+89.0%
