= Koumbia Department =

Coordinates: 11°14′N 3°42′W

Koumbia
- Department
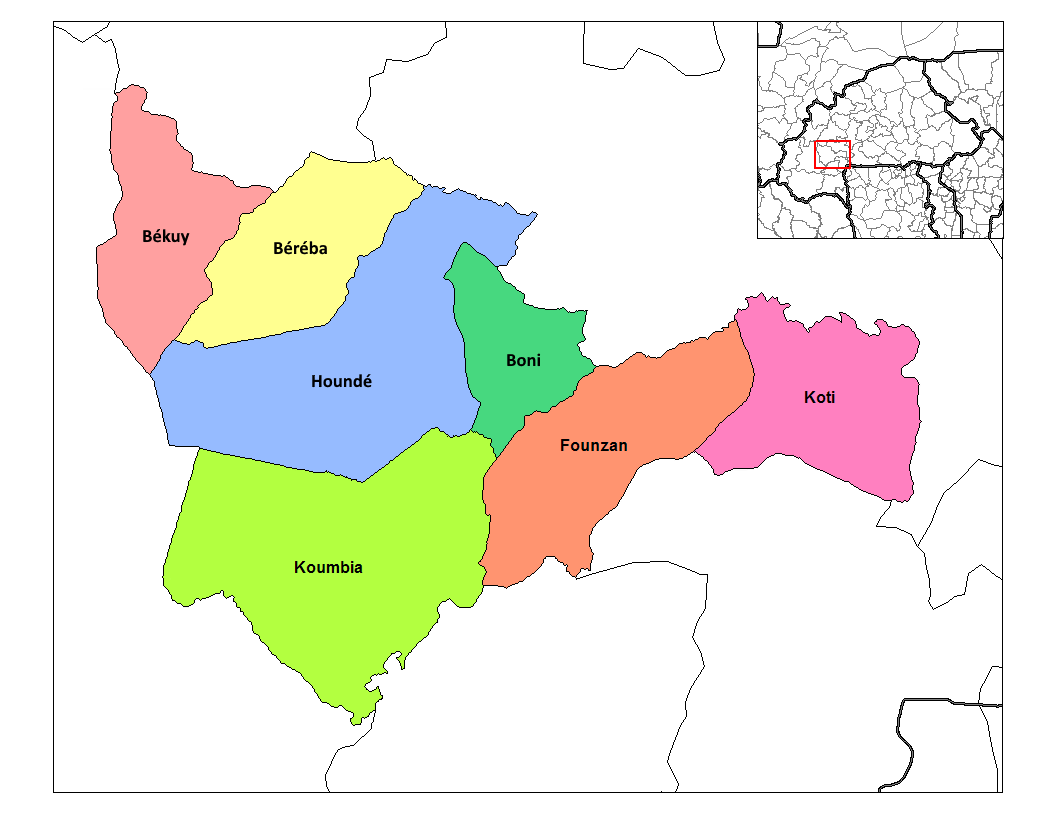
- Koumbia Department location in the province
- Country: Burkina Faso
- Province: Tuy Province

Area
  - Total: 525 sq mi (1,359 km^{2})

Population (2019 census)
  - Total: 46,019
  - Density: 87.70/sq mi (33.86/km^{2})
- Time zone: UTC+0 (GMT 0)

Koumbia is a department or commune of Tuy Province (Hauts-Bassins Region) in southwestern Burkina Faso. Its capital lies at the town of Koumbia.
