= Karaba, Burkina Faso =

- Location within Burkina Faso
- Coordinates: 11°23′N 2°48′W
- Country: Burkina Faso
- Region: Boucle du Mouhoun Region
- Province: Balé Province
- Department: Fara Department
- Elevation: 235 m (771 ft)

Population (2019)
  - Total: 2,095
- Time zone: UTC+0 (GMT)

Karaba is a town in the Fara Department of Balé Province in southern Burkina Faso.

Population
Year	Pop.	±%
1985	766	—
2006	1,281	+67.2%
2019	2,095	+63.5%
