= Honda Capa =

Honda Capa (GA4/6)
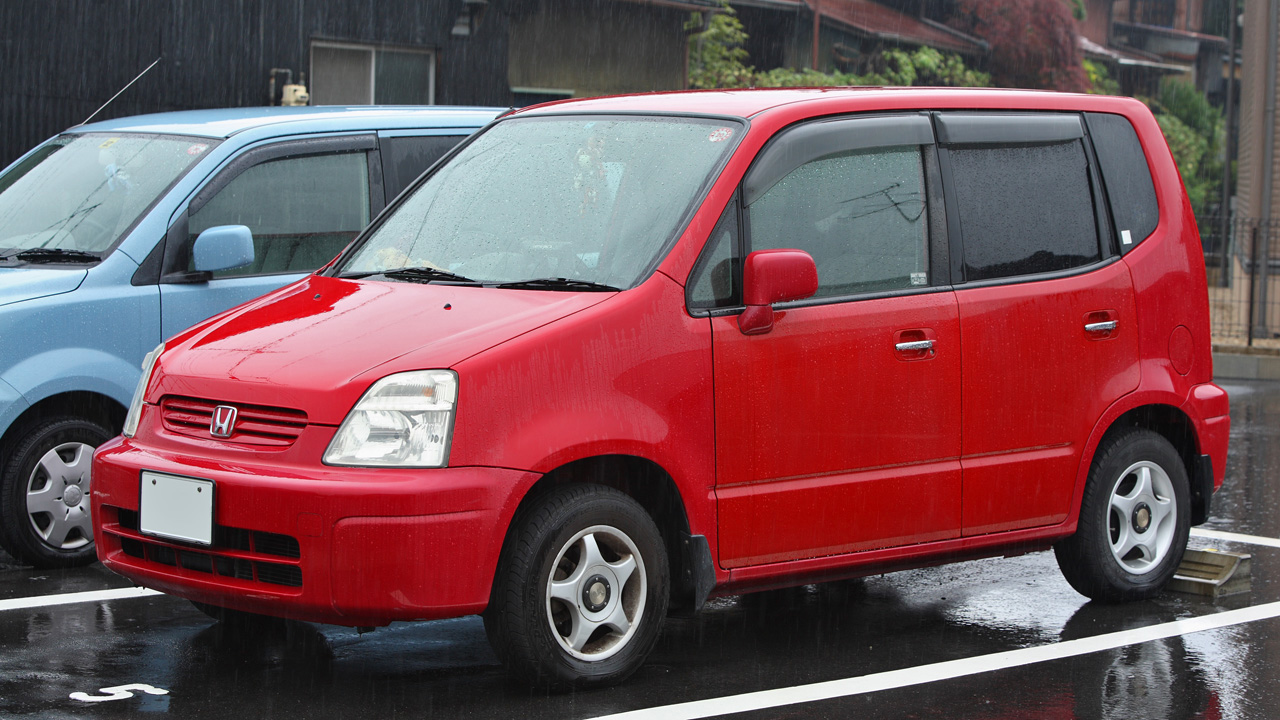

Overview
- Manufacturer: Honda
- Production: 1998–2002
- Assembly: Japan

Body and chassis
- Class: Mini MPV
- Body style: 5-door hatchback
- Layout: Front-engine, front-wheel-drive Front engine, four-wheel-drive
- Related: Honda Logo

Powertrain
- Engine: 1493 cc D15B SOHC I4
- Transmission: CVT; 4-speed automatic

Dimensions
- Wheelbase: 2,360 mm (92.9 in)
- Length: 3,775 mm (148.6 in)
- Width: 1,640 mm (64.6 in)
- Height: 1,650 mm (65.0 in)
- Curb weight: 1,110 kg (2,447 lb)

Chronology
- Predecessor: Honda City (series GA1-GA2)
- Successor: Honda Mobilio/Mobilio Spike

The Honda Capa (short for "capacity") is a small car which was produced by Honda between 1998 and 2002 for the Japanese market. It is a tall five-door wagon with a front-mounted engine and either front-wheel drive or four-wheel drive. It was introduced at the 1997 Tokyo Motor Show as the concept car "J-MW." It went on sale on April 24, 1998, with Honda series code GA4. On September 16, 1999 a four-wheel drive version of the Capa was released, using Honda's Full-Time 4WD system and with the GA6 model code. Brake Assist was offered as standard equipment. Sales were disappointing and the Capa nameplate was discontinued in 2002. It was available in Japan through the Honda Primo and Honda Verno dealerships.

== General information ==
The Honda Capa was developed on the Honda Logo platform and is the first generation of the J Mover series. Its concept was based on a 'Small is Smart' way of thinking. Ease of use in everyday life, compactness, lightness and friendliness to the environment were some of the criteria built into the design. The proposal was that the Capa was to be 'joyful' however this translates better as 'fun'. It was one class larger than the kei-sized Honda Life, but smaller than the compact sized, Honda CR-V which based on the Honda Civic platform, and reflected the growing popularity of MPV/SUV/minivan vehicles.

While a well-thought out design, it arrived after the Nissan Cube, which was typically priced about 10 percent below the Capa, and this made for low sales. In production for just shy of four years, the total number of Capas produced came to 110,312 (the competing Cube reached this number in the first eleven months of sales). This was far short of the original target sales of 72,000 car per year.

The Honda Capa was designed to offer ample headroom and legroom, thanks to a 'dual deck package' chassis design. The interior height of the passenger compartment is 1,240 mm (48.8 in) as a result of this construction, and 1,750 mm (68.9 in) in length. This uses a double floor, with all mechanical items occupying the space beneath a flat floor for the passenger area, which also made for higher safety in a collision. The Honda Capa was equipped with a 1.5-litre, single-overhead-cam, four-valve inline four-cylinder D15B engine. It was initially offered only with Honda's Multimatic continuously variable transmission (CVT), but following an update, a regular four-speed automatic transmission option was introduced as a lower cost option on front-wheel-drive versions.

== Interior ==
The interior design incorporated a grey colour scheme, with seat and door armrest upholstery available in blue or beige tones. The C grade featured jersey fabric, while the D grade used double russell fabric. Climate control was standard, offering an automatic air conditioner for the D grade and a manual one for the C grade. Honda also offered a Utility Kit; this included an under-seat storage drawer and a front passenger seat which folded fully forward to help transport long objects.

== Engine ==
- Water-cooled, inline four-cylinder Honda D15B engine
- Single Overhead Cam 16-valve
- Power output of 98 PS (72 kW) at 6300 rpm
- Torque output of 133 N⋅m (13.6 kg⋅m) at 3500 rpm
- Bore x Stroke: 75 mm x 84.5 mm
- Compression Ration: 9.4:1
- Honda's PGM-FI Fuel Injection System
- Fuel: Regular Unleaded
- Fuel Tank size: 40 litres (8.8 imp gal; 11 US gal)

== GA4/6 model updates ==
- 1997 - Displayed at the Tokyo Motor Show as the J-MW
- 1998 - Announced that sales would begin April 24, 1998
- 1999 - Minor update, including minor remodelling of the bumpers, adding an AWD model to the line-up, 4-speed automatic transmission added to the line-up for the 2WD model only, Honda's Brake Assist system and Tachometer added as standard equipment.
- 2000 - Minor update. Front grille, bumper and seats were changed. Special Edition added to the line-up.
- 2001 - Honda Mobilio announced as the successor to the Honda Capa. Honda Capa production and sales continue.
- 2002 - February: Honda announces the end of production of the Capa due to slumping sales.

== Origin of the name ==
Honda named the Capa based on the English word 'Capacity', referring to ability as well as spaciousness.

== Gallery ==
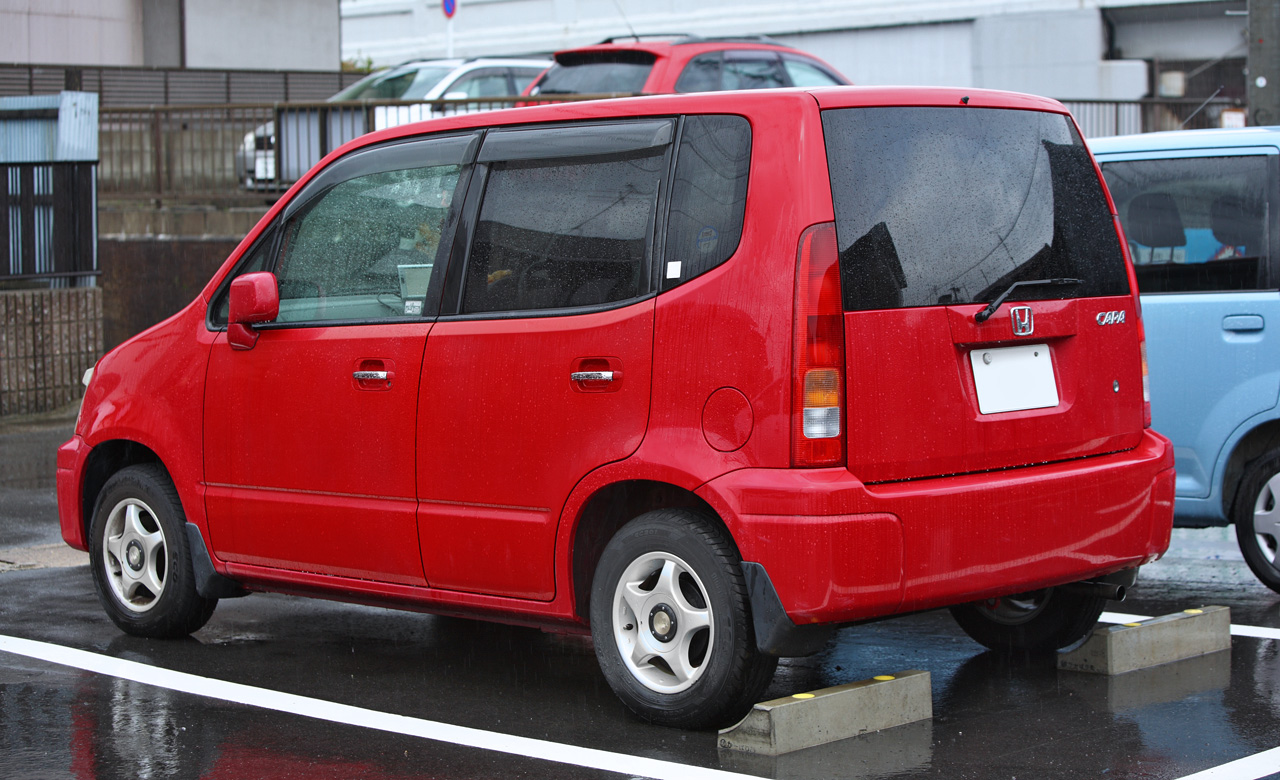
Rear view of Honda Capa

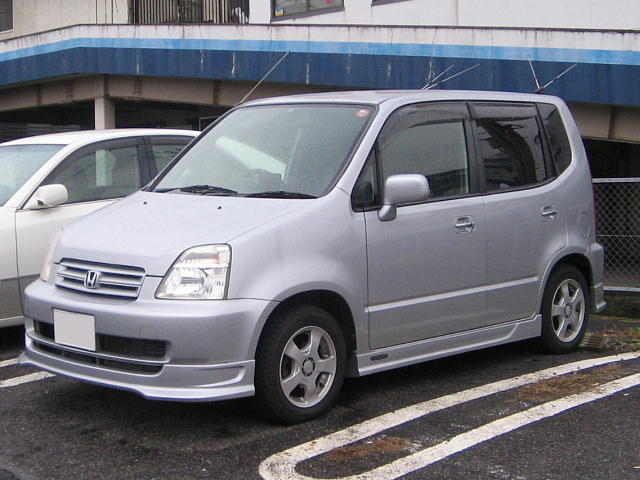
2000 facelift

== See also ==
- Honda Logo
