= Harouna Kaboré =

Burkinabé politician (born 1977)

Dr Harouna Kaboré
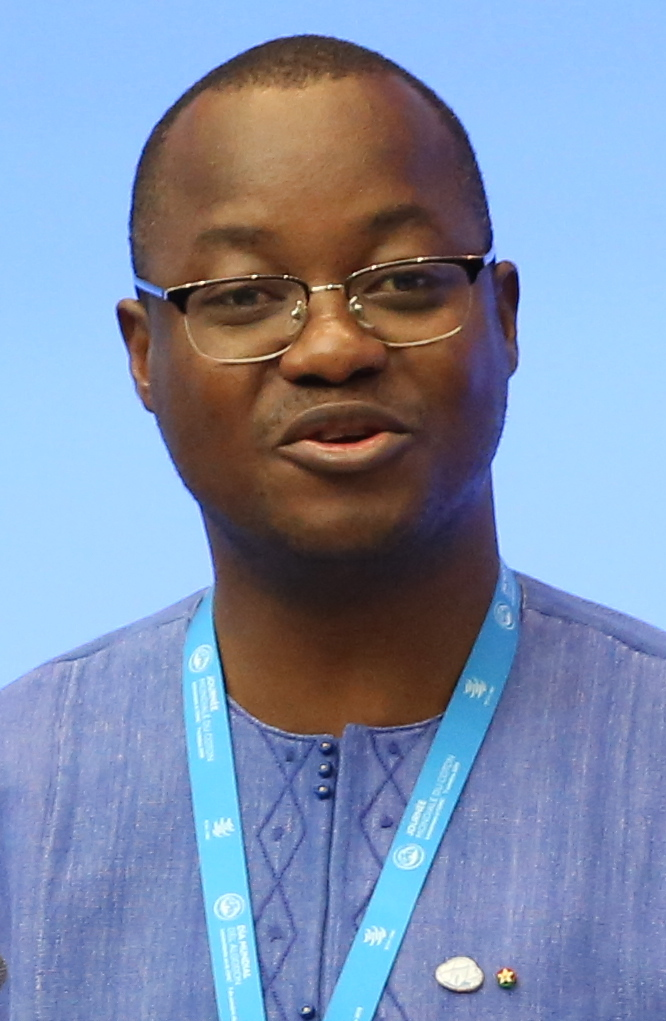
- Harouna Kaboré in 2023

Consultant, Ex-Minister of Commerce, Industry and Handicrafts
- Incumbent
- Assumed office 5 February 2018
- Preceded by: Stéphane Sanou

Personal details
- Born: 24 July 1977 (age 49) Assuéfry, Ivory Coast
- Education: Polytechnic University of Bobo Dioulasso; Paris XII University; University of Paris-Est Marne-la-Vallée

Harouna Kaboré was born on July 24, 1977 in Assuefry (eastern Côte d'Ivoire, in the Tanda prefecture).

He's a politician and consultant

He was Minister of Commerce, Industry and Handicrafts of Burkina faso from January 2018 to December 2021.

== Biography ==
=== Birth and origins ===
Dr Harouna Kaboré was born on July 24, 1977 in Assuefry (eastern Côte d'Ivoire, in the Tanda prefecture).

His father (who died in 2005) was a Burkinabè national who emigrated to Côte d'Ivoire before independence, where he developed cocoa and coffee plantations.

He had three wives and sixteen (16) children. Dr Harouna Kaboré is the second youngest of nine (9) children born to his mother, his father's first wife.

Dr Harouna Kaboré and his brothers and sisters had a happy childhood, divided between school and work in the fields. During their school vacations and free time, the boys helped their father in the fields and played soccer in inter-village tournaments.

Dr Harouna Kaboré remains nostalgic for his childhood in his native village. As the son of a farmer, he remains very attached to agriculture. In addition to his other entrepreneurial activities, this has led him to invest in cotton farming in Burkina, and to travel regularly to the fields in Côte d'Ivoire that he and his siblings inherited from his father.

Dr Harouna KABORE, very attached to his culture, regularly visits his extended family in Godo, his native village in Burkina Faso. Godo is in the province of Boulkiemdé (Central West Region), in the canton of Konkistenga, where the illustrious Philipe Zinda KABORE (Voltaic politician and former deputy for the Ivory Coast colony in the French Assembly in 1946) also hails from.

=== Childhood ===
Dr Harouna Kaboré completed his primary and part of his secondary education in Côte d'Ivoire. In 1994-1995, he returned to his native Burkina Faso to continue his studies in Barsalogho, in the Sanmatenga province (north-central region), where his older brother was an English teacher. In 1995, he obtained his "brevet d'études du premier cycle" (Middle School diploma). His performance in the middle school exam earned him a scholarship from the government of Burkina Faso. He was then sent to the Lycée Technique de Ouagadougou (LTO), now the Lycée National El Hadj Général Sangoulé Lamizana, in the industrial technology class.

== Academic Training ==
=== Studies at the University of Bobo Dioulasso ===
In 1999, Dr Harouna Kaboré graduated High School with a specialization in Electronics. He was admitted to the Polytechnic University of Bobo Dioulasso (now Nazi Boni University) on a state scholarship. He obtained a Bachelor’s degree in Industrial Engineering and Maintenance in 2001.

=== Studies at IUT of SENART Paris 12 ===
Thanks to his jobs in private companies in Burkina Faso, he was able to fund his studies in France for the 2005-2006 academic year. In 2006, he obtained a professional degree in multi-technical maintenance engineering from the IUT of SENART of Université Paris 12 (now Université Paris-Est Créteil Val-de-Marne).

=== Studies at Université Paris Est-Marne-la-vallée ===
Dr Harouna Kaboré continued his studies in France at the Université Paris Est- Marne-la-vallée, where he obtained a Master’s degree in Facility, Enterprises and Services Management in 2008. During his studies at the university, he worked at TF1 television.

=== Doctorate at the Paris Academy of Management Sciences (ASMP) ===
Dr Harouna Kaboré went on to study business administration at the Académie des Sciences de Management in Paris, starting in 2017, and obtained his doctorate by defending his thesis on artificial intelligence in June, 2022 in Paris. The Thesis was "Influence de l'intelligence économique sur la prospective : Cas de l'étude nationale prospective du Burkina à l'horizon 2060".

== Personal life ==
=== Private and family life ===
Married since 2009 to an entrepreneur in the publishing and printing sector, Dr Harouna Kaboré has two sons. His wife is by his side, providing him with advice and support in his professional and civic life. Coming from a close-knit family, Dr Harouna Kaboré can also count on the support of his brothers, sisters, uncles and his mother, with whom he shares a special bond.

=== Art and Culture lover and patron ===
Since high school, Dr Harouna Kaboré has had a passion for Art and Culture. Involved in his high school (LTO ) dance and theater troupe, he was coached by traditional dance icon Esther Marty KOUYATE. He was an actor in the play adapted from the novel "De la chaire au trône" by Hamadou Kourouma, directed by Alain HEMA and Charles OUATTARA. This passion for culture, which he considers to be one of Africa's most important assets, accompanied him throughout his youth and made him a seasoned sponsor and advocate of Burkinabe cultural projects. In 2017, he initiated and supported the production of a theatrical adaptation of journalist Norbert Zongo's novel Rougbêinga. His Think tank Burkina International has produced the documentary "Devoir de mémoire sur la reconstruction de la Haute Volta". The film is regularly screened in various locations, as an opportunity for Burkinabé to learn more about their country's history. The Think Tank is also producing a documentary film on "100 years (1919-2019) of Upper Volta, now Burkina Faso". The film "Witba" by director Apolline Traoré is another initiative to highlight the role played by Burkinabè women in the socio-economic and political construction of Burkina Faso over the last hundred years.

Dr Harouna KABORE also supports writers' projects. The civil organization, Endogène movement which he chairs, organized a high-level citizen's laboratory held on December 9, 2019, which produced a report and proposals for dynamizing the cultural sector in Burkina.

== Professional career ==
=== First professional experiences in the private sector 2002 and 2005 ===
After obtaining his bachelor’s degree in 2001, Dr Harouna Kaboré became a freelance maintenance and electrical technician on construction sites in Ouagadougou. Between 2002 and 2003, he was hired as head of after-sales service at Megamonde, in charge of air conditioning, electricity and generators. In 2003, the young industrial maintenance technician was hired by the Fadoul Group, which distributes electromechanical equipment, building and civil engineering, industry, audiovisuals and household appliances, among other things

=== Company start-ups ===
After his studies in France, Dr Harouna Kaboré and a partner set up their first company "Facility's Associates Sarl" in Burkina Faso in 2019. In 2012, he set up a design office called "Coefficient Sarl". In 2014, Dr Harouna KABORE launched "Facility's Sarl" in Abidjan, Côte d'Ivoire. Dr Harouna Kaboré created the company "Service Distribution Logistique Sarl (SDL)" in 2015. SDL evolved into Africa Energy Corporation SA (AEC) in 2016. At the end of 2017, AEC SA, in partnership with the French company Green Yellow, created the Société de production d'énergie solaire de Ouagadougou (SPES Ouaga) to build a 30 MW solar power plant in Burkina Faso, precisely in Nagréongo, some twenty kilometers from Ouagadougou. The solar power plant was inaugurated and commissioned in July 2022.

=== Minister for Industry, Trade and Crafts ===
Dr Harouna Kaboré was Burkina Faso's Minister for Industry, Trade and Crafts from January 2018 to December 2021.

The actions and achievements of the ministerial department under the leadership of Dr Harouna Kaboré have contributed to achieving the objectives of the National Economic and Social Development Plan (PNDES), by taking up the challenge of optimizing the contribution of the private sector to the establishment of inclusive growth capable of meeting the strong aspirations of the population.

At the head of this ministerial department in charge of the private sector, Dr Harouna KABORE led major economic reforms and set up various initiatives that contributed to the economic recovery and structural transformation of the Burkina economy.

Dr Harouna KABORÉ's tenure at the Ministry in charge of the private sector will be particularly marked by a number of innovations, such as the labelling and certification of local Burkina products and those manufactured by the country's semi-industrial and industrial processing units. Labels such as "Made in Burkina", "Faso Dafani" (Burkinabè cotton fabric woven from cotton thread), "Chapeau de Saponé" (traditional hat handmade in Saponé, some 50 km from Ouaga), "Koko Dunda" (hand-dyed loincloth, particularly in the town of Bobo Dioulasso) and "Beurre du Karité du Burkina" (Burkina shea butter) are just some of Harouna KABORE’s work during his four years tenure.

The policy of "consumons local" (let's consume locally) dear to the father of the Burkinabè revolution, the late Thomas SANKARA, and pursued during the mandate of President Roch KABORÉ, through axis 3 of the PNDES, has been materialized by Harouna KABORÉ and his team.

The "Made in Burkina" promotional website, the development of several strategies (national industrialization strategy, revised national export promotion strategy, national strategy for the promotion of local consumption, national Zlecaf strategy, new economic models for the cotton value chain) have all contributed to providing the local economy with structural steering tools. The creation of new structures such as the Conseil Burkinabè d'Anacarde (CBA), the Agence Burkinabè d'Investissement (ABI), etc. has helped to promote promising sectors and encourage investment. Measures to revive industries (Sn Citec, Sn Sossuco, Sap Olympique etc...), financing for SMI-SMEs, the regulation of abusive imports, the fight against fraud and counterfeiting through the creation of a Mobile Brigade for Economic Control and Fraud Repression (BMCRF) will remain major highlights of Dr Harouna KABORE's record as Minister.

A champion of Burkinabè industrial rearmament through on-site processing of local raw materials, Dr Harouna KABORE is nicknamed "Mr Labeling", "Mr Let's consume locally" or "Mr Made in Burkina", as he is committed to endogenous development and inspired by Burkinabè politicians Joseph Ki Zerbo and Thomas Sankara.

== Civic involvement ==
=== Collectif des Organisations Démocratiques de Masse et de Partis Politiques (CODMPP) activist ===
Dr Harouna Kaboré was one of the first leaders of school and student protest structures in the wake of Norbert Zongo's assassination. On December 16, 1998, human rights organizations, public and private workers' unions and opposition political parties formed the Collectif des organisations démocratiques de masse et de partis politiques (CODMPP) to demand justice and truth for Norbert Zongo and his companions. Also known as the collective against impunity or the "trop c’est trop" movement, with leaders such as Me Halidou Ouédraogo of the MBDHP, Tôlé Sagnon of the CGTB and Pr Joseph Ki Zerbo, the Collectif also calls for truth and justice for all outstanding economic and blood crimes.

=== Active member of the Association des élevés et scolaires de Ouagadougou (AESO) and the Association Nationale des Étudiants du Burkina Faso (ANEB), a section of the Union General des Étudiants Burkinabè (UGEB). ===
At the Lycée Technique in Ouagadougou, Dr Harouna KABORÉ was a leader of the AESO, the students' union, and along with his fellow students, championed student's demands for improved study conditions. Involved in the student movement from the time he entered the Polytechnic University of Bobo Dioulasso (UPB), now the Nazi Boni University, he was elected vice-president of ANEB-Bobo in 1999, and the following year became its president for the academic year (2000-2001). The actions undertaken led to a major improvement in students' living conditions in terms of accommodation, transport and catering. Dr Harouna KABORE was also the elected general delegate of the UPB IUT, and during his term of office set up the IUT student association (AMITECH) alongside those of the Ecole Superieur de l'Informatique (ESI), and the Institut du Développement Rural (IDR), the three entities that made up the UPB.

Arriving in Paris in 2005, Dr Harouna Kaboré continued his activism in Burkinabè student associations in France. In 2005, he was elected General Secretary of the Association des Étudiants Burkinabè en France (a section of the Union Générale des Étudiants Burkinabè (UGEB)). The following year, he became President of the UGEB, a position he held concurrently until 2009. Dr Harouna Kaboré is also a member of the board of the Collectif de France Affaire Norbert Zongo (COFANZO) and an activist with the Mouvement Burkinabè des Droits de l'Homme et des Peuples (MBDHP) section France.

=== Burkina International think tank ===
-With two partners, Dr Harouna Kaboré founded in 2015, Think tank Burkina International of which he chaired the board of directors until 2018. Think tank Burkina International is an association equidistant from political parties, a laboratory of ideas and a force for proposals whose slogan is "Penser pour Peser" ("Think to Weigh"). Burkina International carries out forward-looking studies and leads reflection on topics that can lead to implementation of public development policies.

=== Mobilization during the political and social crises of 2014 and 2015 ===
Dr Harouna Kaboré is the author of the slogan-concept "Le Faso d'abord" meaning the republic and its values come first. The slogan launched in October 2014 on his Facebook page and gradually become a slogan and the trigger for the mobilization of many patriots during the popular uprising of October 30 and 31, 2014 and the resistance to the putsch of September 2015. He was one of the spokesmen for the coordination of civil society organizations under the transition government in 2015. His image as a business leader, intellectual and citizen committed to the defense of democracy, the republic and its values gives him a national aura.

=== ENDOGÈNE association ===
In 2019, Dr Harouna Kaboré and a number of fellow members created the ENDOGÈNE association (originally called "Citoyen du Renouveau"). ENDOGÈNE is an association for civic education and social entrepreneurship. It is an organization that emphasizes the capacity of the Burkinabe people to reinvent their future in a collective surge of lasting patriotic awareness. Its slogan is the triptych "Converser - Converger - Convertir": Converser to establish a genuine dialogue between citizens, Converger to bring ideas together towards a common goal, and Convertir to transform a shared vision into action for the people.

== Political career and intellectual pursuits ==
=== Political affiliation ===
Dr Harouna Kaboré has never been a member of any political party. He has taken part in all the democratic struggles in Burkina as a member of civil society since high school and university. Dr Harouna KABORE took part in the re-election campaign of the former President of Faso (2016-2022), SEM Roch Marc Christian KABORE in 2020 within a campaign movement called "The Roch Label", an organization that was dissolved the day after the elections.

=== Intellectual occupations ===
Dr Harouna KABORE conducts strategic studies and regularly participates in conferences and panel discussions on topics related to economic intelligence, foresight, public policy, public and private investment, industrialization, development of agricultural value chains, public-private partnerships, culture, citizenship, etc...

== Publications ==
Dr Harouna KABORE is author of the book "Influence de l'intelligence économique sur la prospective (préconisations pour l'Étude Nationale Prospectives Burkina 2050)" published in May 2023.

== Others / Awards ==
- Elected consular member of the Burkina Faso Chamber of Commerce and Industry in 2012.
- Chevalier of the order of merit of Commerce and Industry in 2012
- Chevalier of the National Order in 2015
- Officer of the Order of Merit of Commerce and Industry in 2017
- Officer of the Order of the Stallion 2018
- Burkina Faso winner of the WHO "World No Tobacco Day 2022" award
