= Fara Department =

Coordinates: 11°32′N 2°46′W

Fara
- Department
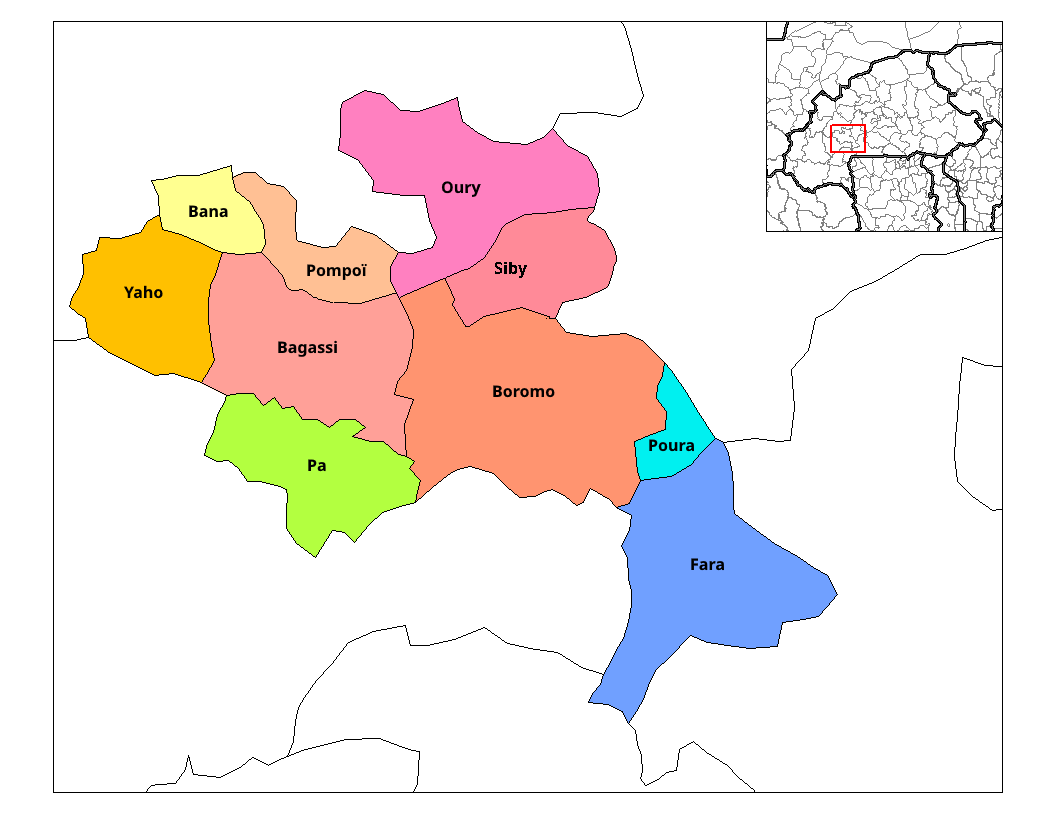
- Fara Department location in the province
- Country: Burkina Faso
- Province: Balé

Area
  - Total: 281 sq mi (728 km^{2})

Population (2019)
  - Total: 60,972
  - Density: 217/sq mi (83.8/km^{2})
- Time zone: UTC+0 (GMT 0)

Fara is a department or commune of Balé Province in southern Burkina Faso. Its capital is the town of Fara. According to the 2019 census the department has a population of 60,972.

== Towns and villages ==
Towns and villages and populations in the department are as follows:

- Fara (9 259 inhabitants) (capital)
- Bilatio (224 inhabitants)
- Bouzourou (964 inhabitants)
- Daho (647 inhabitants)
- Dakayes (718 inhabitants)
- Diansi (182 inhabitants)
- Fitien (511 inhabitants)
- Kabourou (2 674 inhabitants)
- Kapa (246 inhabitants)
- Karaba (1 126 inhabitants)
- Konzena (320 inhabitants)
- Koumbia (823 inhabitants)
- Laro (2 819 inhabitants)
- Nabou-nouni (1 897 inhabitants)
- Nabou-peulh (712 inhabitants)
- Nanano (1 870 inhabitants)
- Naouya (1 343 inhabitants)
- Nasma (152 inhabitants)
- Nasséné (791 inhabitants)
- Pomain (1 469 inhabitants)
- Sadon-bobo (1 075 inhabitants)
- Tialla (667 inhabitants)
- Ton (2 095 inhabitants)
- Toné (2 536 inhabitants)
