= Toeni Department =

Coordinates: 13.4367°N 3.1814°W

Toeni
- Department
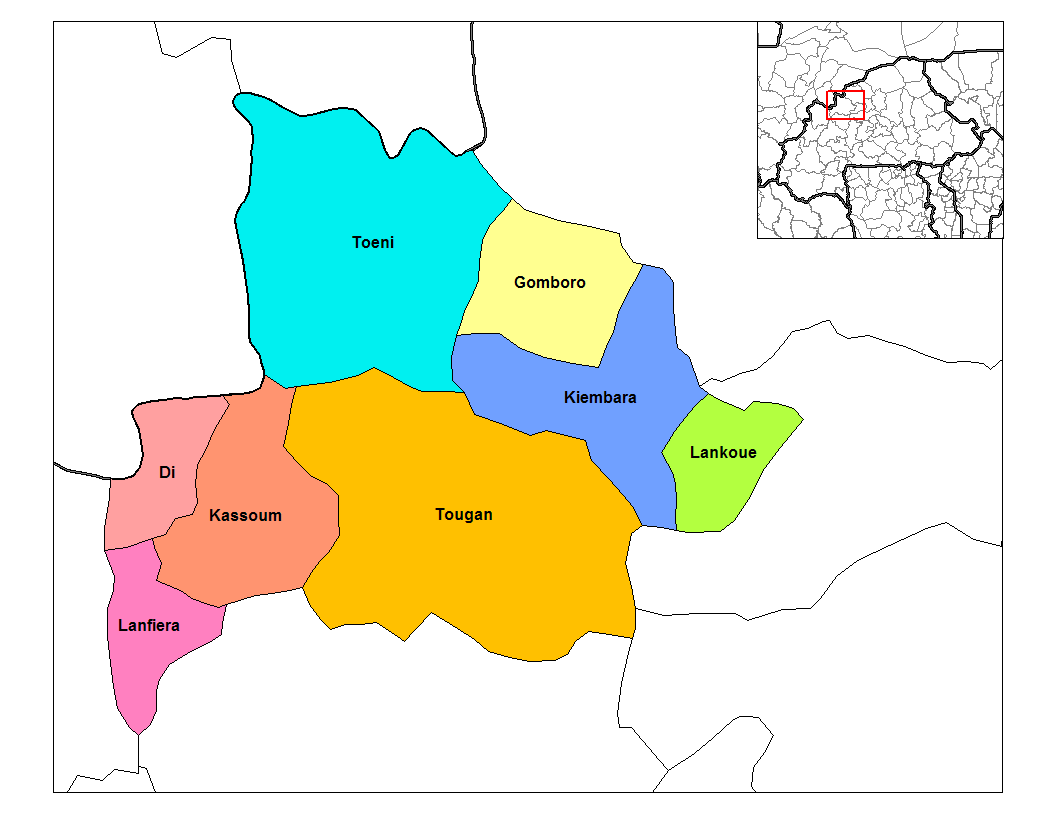
- Toeni Department location in the province
- Country: Burkina Faso
- Province: Sourou Province

Area
  - Total: 552 sq mi (1,429 km^{2})

Population (2019 census)
  - Total: 32,708
  - Density: 59.28/sq mi (22.89/km^{2})
- Time zone: UTC+0 (GMT 0)

Toeni is a department or commune of Sourou Province in north-western Burkina Faso. Its capital lies at the town of Toeni.
