= Houndé =

- City
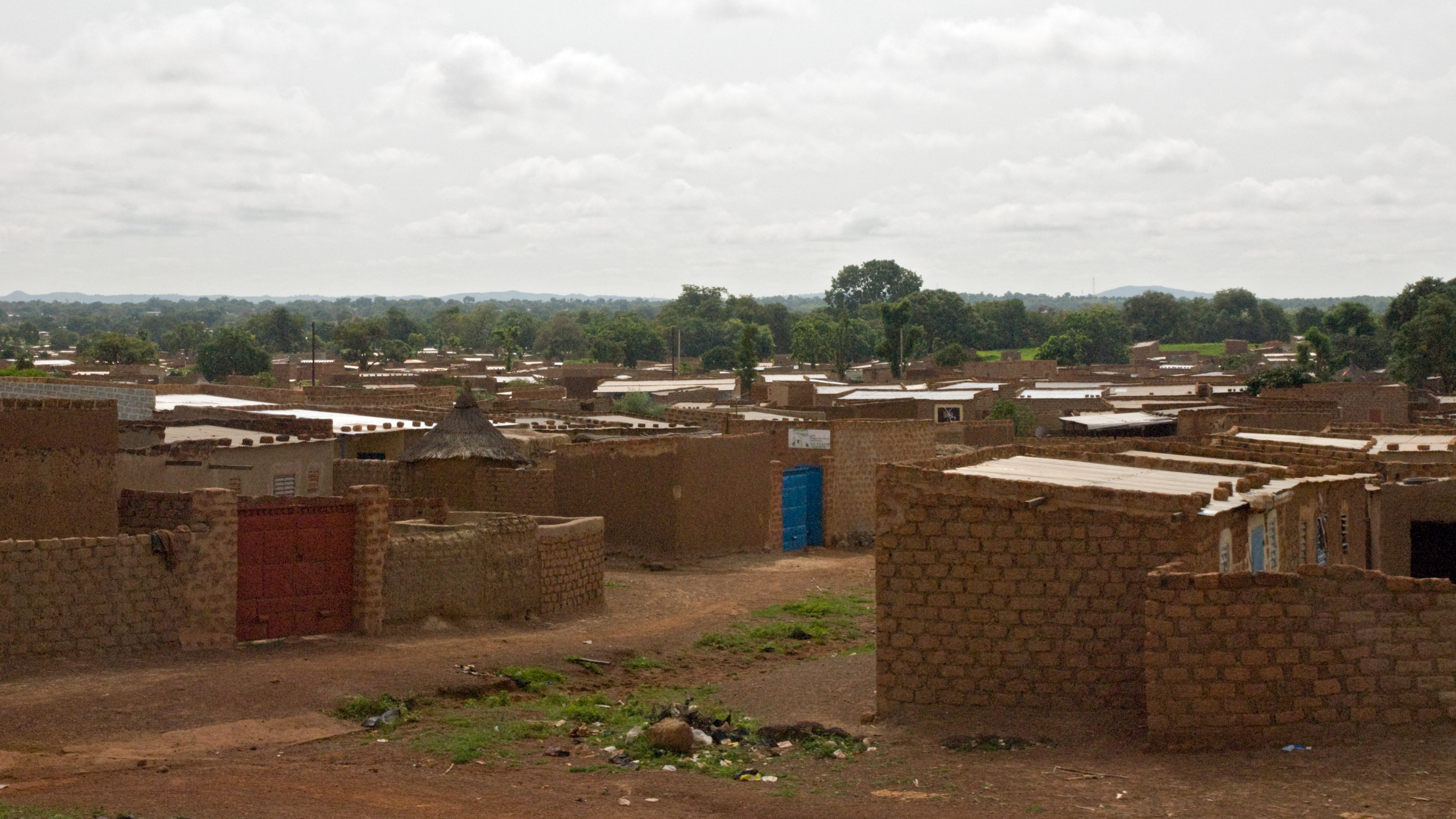
- View on one of the neighborhoods (August 2017)

- Location within Burkina Faso
- Coordinates: 11°30′N 3°31′W
- Country: Burkina Faso
- Region: Hauts-Bassins Region
- Province: Tuy Province
- Elevation: 357 m (1,171 ft)

Population (2019 census)
  - Total: 87,151
- Time zone: UTC+0 (GMT)

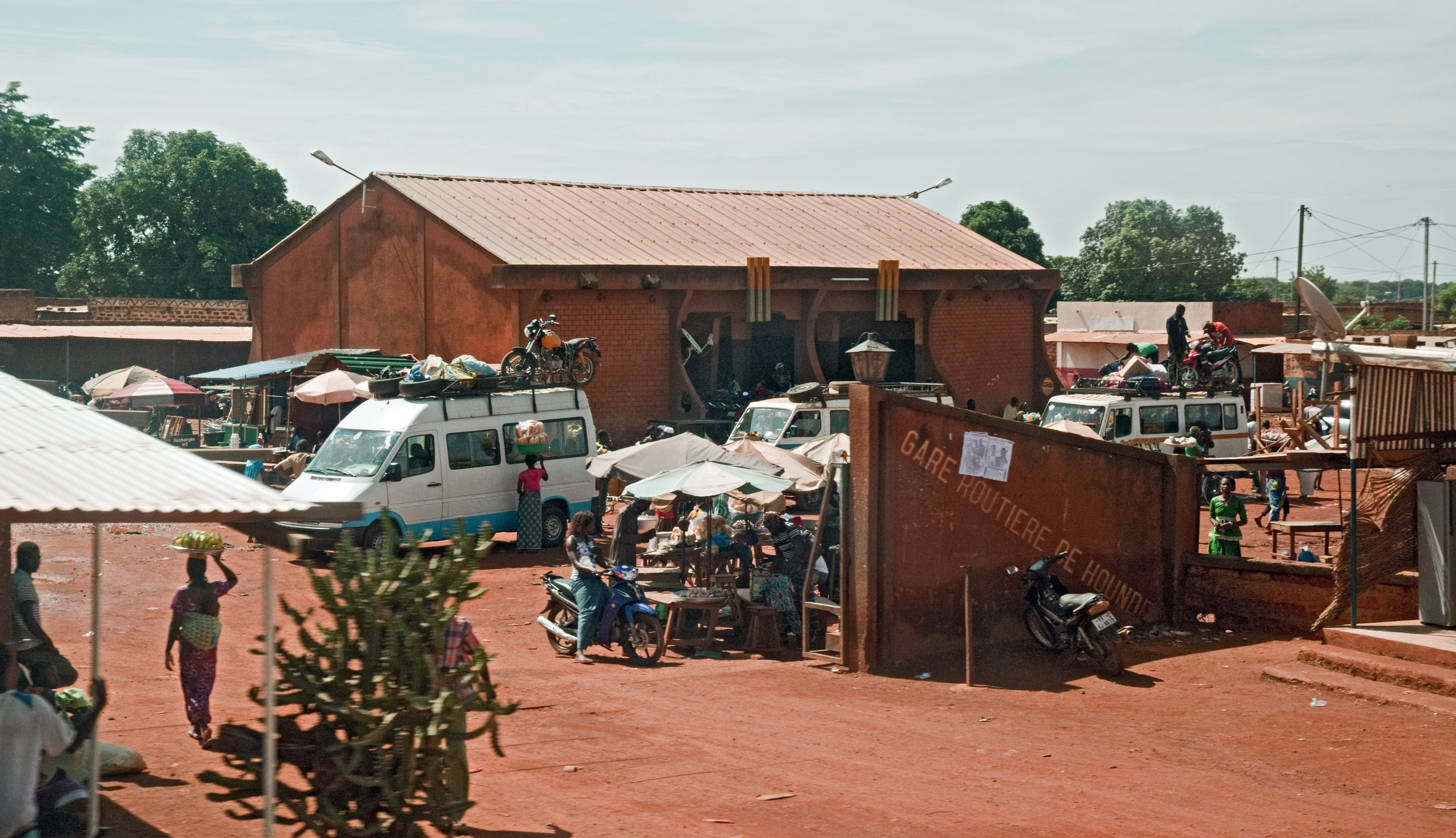
The Houndé bus station (September 2018)

Houndé is a city located in the province of Tuy (of which it is the capital) in the Hauts-Bassins Region of Burkina Faso. It is situated about 100 kilometres (62 mi) east by northeast of Bobo-Dioulasso along the trunk road Route Nationale N1 to Ouagadougou.

Houndé is the site of Houndé Mine, a major gold mine that is mostly owned by Endeavour Mining.
