= Tuy Province =

Coordinates: 11°25′N 3°25′W

Tuy
- Province
- Location in Burkina Faso

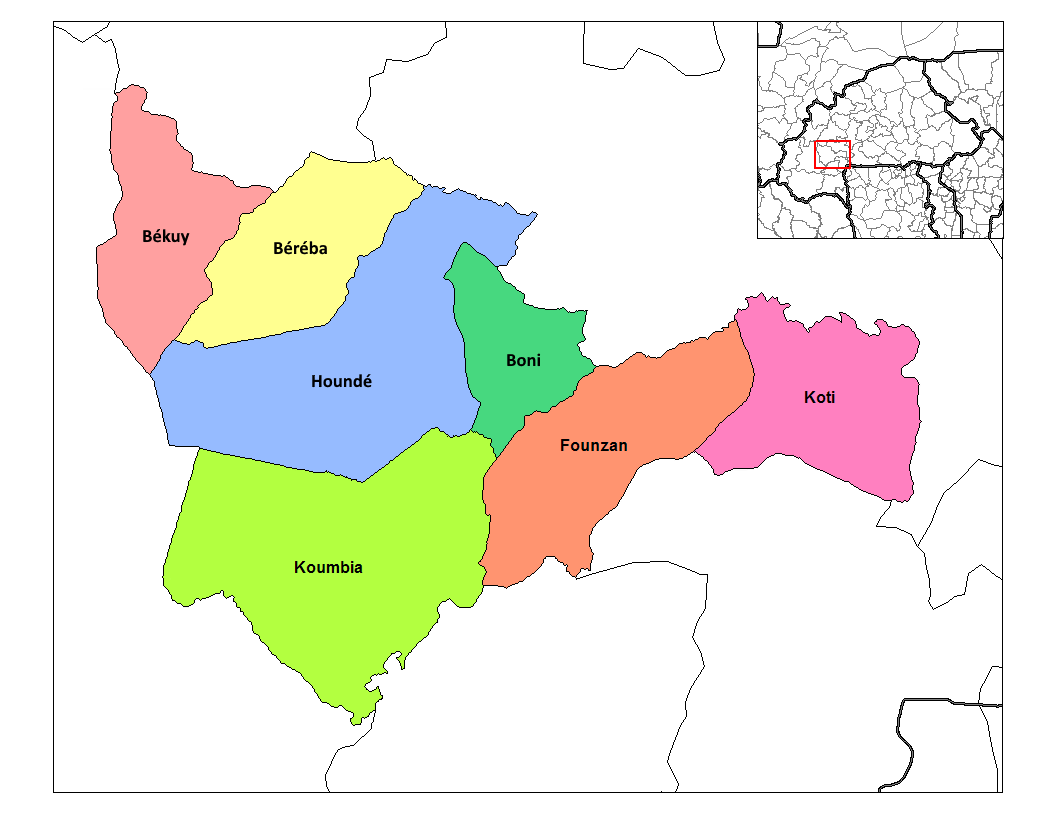
- Provincial map of its departments
- Country: Burkina Faso
- Region: Hauts-Bassins Region
- Capital: Houndé

Area
  - Province: 5,633 km^{2} (2,175 sq mi)

Population (2019 census)
  - Province: 329,162
  - Density: 58.43/km^{2} (151.3/sq mi)
  - Urban: 87,151
- Time zone: UTC+0 (GMT 0)

Tuy (or Tui) is one of the 45 provinces of Burkina Faso, located in its Hauts-Bassins Region. Its capital is Houndé.

== Economy ==
Burkina Manganèse SARL currently holds a ten-year renewable mining permit to extract manganese from the Kiéré mine where it expects to commence production during October.

== Departments ==
Tuy is divided into 6 departments:

The Departments of Tuy
Commune	Capital	Population (Census 2006)
Békuy Department	Békuy	
Béréba Department	Béréba	
Founzan Department	Founzan	
Houndé Department	Houndé	
Koti Department	Koti	
Koumbia Department	Koumbia	

== See also ==
- Regions of Burkina Faso
- Provinces of Burkina Faso
- Departments of Burkina Faso
