= Glossary of spirituality terms =

This is a glossary of spirituality-related terms. Spirituality is closely linked to religion.

== A ==
- Afterlife: (or life after death) A generic term referring to a purported continuation of existence, typically spiritual and experiential, beyond this world, or a personal reputation that is so strong as to be capable of persistent social influence long after death. (see also soul)
- Agnosticism: the view that the existence of God or the supernatural is unknown or unknowable.
- Ahimsa: A religious principle of non-violence and respect for all life. Ahimsa (अहिंसा ahiṁsā) is Sanskrit for avoidance of himsa, or injury. It is interpreted most often as meaning peace and reverence toward all sentient beings. Ahimsa is the core of Hinduism, Jainism, and Buddhism. Its first mention in Indian philosophy is found in the Hindu scriptures called the Upanishads, the oldest dating about 800 BC. Those who practice Ahimsa are often vegetarians or vegans.
- Aikido: (合気道 Aikidō, also 合氣道 using an older style of kanji) Literally meaning "harmony energy way", or with some poetic license, "way of the harmonious spirit", aikido is a gendai budo – a modern Japanese martial art. Practitioners of aikido are known as aikidoka. Aikido is also considered to contain a significant spiritual component.
- Akashic Records: (Akasha is a Sanskrit word meaning "sky", "space" or "aether") In the religion of theosophy and the philosophical school called anthroposophy, the Akashic records are a compendium of all universal events, thoughts, words, emotions and intent ever to have occurred in the past, present, or future in terms of all entities and life forms, not just human. They are believed by theosophists to be encoded in a non-physical plane of existence known as the mental plane.
- Ancestor worship: (拜祖), also ancestor veneration (敬祖) A religious practice based on the belief that one's ancestors possess supernatural powers.
- Animism: The religious belief that all objects, places, and creatures possess a distinct spiritual essence.
- Asceticism: Denotes a life which is characterised by refraining from worldly pleasures (austerity). Those who practice ascetic lifestyles often perceive their practices as virtuous and pursue them to achieve greater spirituality.
- Atheism: In the broadest sense, is the absence of belief in the existence of deities. Less broadly, atheism is the rejection of belief that any deities exist. In an even narrower sense, atheism is specifically the position that there are no deities. Atheism is contrasted with theism, which, in its most general form, is the belief in at least one deity.

== B ==
- Bagua (concept): (Chinese: 八卦; pinyin: bāguà; Wade–Giles: pa¹-kua⁴; lit. 'eight trigrams'; Korean: 팔괘; MR: p'algwae) An ancient Chinese philosophical concept, the bagua is an octagonal diagram with eight trigrams on each side. The concept of bagua is applied not only to Chinese Taoist thought and the I Ching, but is also used in other domains of Chinese culture, such as fengshui, martial arts, navigation, etc.
- Baháʼí Faith: A global religion founded by Bahá'u'lláh, a nineteenth-century Iranian exile.
- Blessing: (from to bless, Old English bleodsian or bletsian) Originally meant "sprinkling with blood" during the pagan sacrifices, the Blóts (reference: AHD). A blessing, (also used to refer to bestowing of such) is the infusion of something with holiness, divine will, or one's hopes. Within Roman Catholicism, Eastern Orthodoxy, and similar traditions, formal blessings of the church are performed by bishops, priests, and sometimes deacons, but as in many other religions, anyone may formally bless another.
- body (of person) provides the physical force or actuation of a person historically represented as a slave to the mind.

== C ==
- Chakra: In Hinduism and its spiritual systems of yoga and in some related eastern cultures, as well as in some segments of the New Age movement—and to some degree the distinctly different New Thought movement—a chakra is thought to be an energy node in the human body.
- Chant: The rhythmic speaking or singing of words or sounds, either on a single pitch or with a simple melody involving a limited set of notes and often including a great deal of repetition or statis. Chant may be considered speech, music, or a heightened form of speech which is more effective in conveying emotion or expressing ones spiritual side.
- Channelling: The act of attaining information (from a state of being in the present moment) from higher power or spirits and bringing it forth through writing, speaking, teaching or music.
- Creation: The term creation refers to the beginnings of humanity, earth, life, and the universe (cosmogony). Some accounts of creation describe the beginnings of the universe as a deliberate act of "Creation" by a supreme being.
- Consciousness: A quality of the mind generally regarded to comprise qualities such as subjectivity, self-awareness, sentience, sapience, and the ability to perceive the relationship between oneself and one's environment. Many philosophers divide consciousness into phenomenal consciousness which is experience itself and access consciousness which is the processing of the things in experience.

Many cultures and religious traditions place the seat of consciousness in a soul separate from the body. Conversely, many scientists and philosophers consider consciousness to be intimately linked to the neural functioning of the brain dictating the way in which the world is experienced. This aspect of consciousness is the subject of much debate and research in philosophy of mind, psychology, brain biology, neurology, and cognitive science.

- Contemplation: A type of prayer or meditation in the Christian, especially Catholic, tradition. It is an attempt to experience God directly. It is connected to Christian mysticism, and authors such as Teresa of Avila, Margery Kempe, Augustine Baker and Thomas Merton have written about it extensively. It is briefly described in the Catechism of the Catholic Church, paragraphs 2709 onwards, where the Song of Songs is quoted.
- Cosmogony: [Gr. Kosmogonia from Kosmos the world and root of gignesthai to be born] A description (or model) of the coming into existence, the creation and origination of the universe. It is also the study of these aspects. So a cosmogony describes how the Universe came to be; hence, the account of the creation of the world in the Book of Genesis is one such cosmogony, and there are many others, both scientific and mythological. This contrasts with cosmology, which studies the Universe at large, throughout its existence.

== D ==
- Deism: Historical and modern deism is defined by the view that reason, rather than revelation or tradition, should be the basis of belief in God. Deists reject organized religion and promote reason as the essential element in making moral decisions. This "rational" basis was usually founded upon the cosmological argument (first cause argument), the teleological argument (argument from design), and other aspects of what was called natural religion. Deism has become identified with the classical belief that God created but does not intervene in the world, though this is not a necessary component of deism.
- Deity: (or a god) A postulated preternatural being, usually, but not always, of significant power, worshipped, thought holy, divine, or sacred, held in high regard, or respected by human beings. They assume a variety of forms, but are frequently depicted as having human or animal form. Sometimes it is considered blasphemous to imagine the deity as having any concrete form. They are usually immortal. They are commonly assumed to have personalities and to possess consciousness, intellects, desires, and emotions much like humans. Such natural phenomena as lightning, floods, storms, other "acts of God”, and miracles are attributed to them, and they may be thought to be the authorities or controllers of every aspect of human life (such as birth or the afterlife). Some deities are asserted to be the directors of time and fate itself, to be the givers of human law and morality, to be the ultimate judges of human worth and behavior, and to be the designers and creators of the Earth or the universe. Some of these "gods" have no power at all-they are simply worshipped.
- Dhammapada: (Pali, translates as Path of the Dharma. Also Prakrit Dhamapada, Sanskrit Dharmapada) A Buddhist religious scripture, containing 423 verses in 26 categories. According to tradition, these are answers to questions put to the Buddha on various occasions, most of which deal with ethics.
- Dharma: (sanskrit, roughly law or way) The way of the higher Truths. Beings that live in harmony with Dharma proceed quicker towards enlightenment, nirvana, or personal liberation, a concept first taught in Indian religions (Hinduism, Buddhism, Jainism and Sikhism).
- Dhikr: Arabic. ("pronouncement", "invocation" or "remembrance") also spelled zikr based on its pronunciation in Turkish and Persian.

Dhikr is the remembrance of God commanded in the Qur'an for all Muslims. To engage in dhikr is to have awareness of God according to Islam. Dhikr as a devotional act includes the repetition of divine names, supplications and aphorisms from hadith literature, and sections of the Qur'an. More generally, any activity in which the Muslim maintains awareness of God is considered dhikr.

- Deus alternatively Deo/Dios in Romance languages is the name of God. It comes from the Latin which in turn comes from the Greek "Zeus", who in Greek mythology he was the god of the gods. The word "Zeus"which has the same Indo-European root *dyeu- or "day", and means sun or bright. The Romans incorporated the Greek pantheon by giving them their own names. Zeus, the father god, became Zues Pater, (god the father) which became Jupiter. The Jews never used that term in their writings, rather they used the four letter tetragram from which the name Jehovah is formed.

== E ==
- Emanationism: Technically is a henotheism component in the cosmology of certain religious or philosophical systems that argue a Supreme Being did not directly create the physical universe, but instead emanated lower spiritual beings who created the world.
- Enlightenment: A concept related to the Buddhist bodhi.
- Entheogen: A modern term derived from two Ancient Greek words, ἔνθεος (entheos) and γενέσθαι (genesthai). Entheos means literally "in God", more freely translated "inspired". The Greeks used it as a term of praise for poets and other artists. Genesthai means "to cause to be". So an entheogen is "that which causes (a person) to be in God". The translation "creating the divine within" that is sometimes given is not quite correct -- entheogen implies neither that something is created (as opposed to just perceiving something that is already there) nor that that which is experienced is within the user (as opposed to having independent existence).
- Epigenesis: The philosophical/theological/esoteric idea that since the mind was given to the human being, it is this original creative impulse, epigenesis, which has been the cause of all of mankind's development.
- Epiphany: (Greek: επιφάνεια, "the appearance; miraculous phenomenon") A Christian feast intended to celebrate the 'shining forth' or revelation of God to mankind in human form, in the person of Jesus. The observance had its origins in the eastern Christian churches, and included the birth of Jesus; the visit of the three Magi (Caspar, Melchior and Balthasar) who arrived in Bethlehem; and all of Jesus' childhood events, up to his baptism in the Jordan by John the Baptist. The feast was initially based on, and viewed as a fulfillment of, the Jewish Feast of Lights. This was fixed on January 6.
- Eschatology: (from the Greek eschatos meaning "last" + -logy) A part of theology concerned with the final events in human history or the ultimate fate of human kind, commonly phrased as the end of the world. In many religions, the end of the world is a future event prophesied in sacred texts or folklore. More broadly, eschatology may encompass related concepts such as the messiah or messianic era, the afterlife, and the soul.
- Esotericism: Refers to knowledge suitable only for the advanced, privileged, or initiated, as opposed to exoteric knowledge, which is public. It is used especially for mystical, occult and spiritual viewpoints.
- Eternal return: (or sometimes eternal recurrence) A concept originating from ancient Egypt and developed in the teachings of Pythagoras.
- Eternity: While in the popular mind, eternity often simply means existing for an infinite, i.e., limitless, amount of time, many have used it to refer to a timeless existence altogether outside of time. There are a number of arguments for eternity, by which proponents of the concept, principally, Aristotle, purported to prove that matter, motion, and time must have existed eternally.
- Eutheism, dystheism, and maltheism: Eutheism and dystheism are dialectic opposites within the spectrum of theistic religious beliefs.

- Eutheism is the belief that God exists and is good.
- Dystheism is the belief that God exists but is not good.

- Existence: There is no universally accepted theory of what the word existence means. The dominant (though by no means universal) view in twentieth-century and contemporary Anglo-American philosophy is that existence is what is asserted by statements of first-order logic of the form "for some x Fx". This agrees with the simple and commonsensical view that, in uttering "There is a bridge across the Thames at Hammersmith", or "A bridge crosses the Thames at Hammersmith", we are asserting the existence of a bridge across the Thames at Hammersmith. The word "existence", on this view, is simply a way of describing the logical form of ordinary subject-predicate sentence.
- Exorcism: The practice of evicting demons or other evil spiritual entities which are supposed to have possessed (taken control of) a person or object. The practice, though ancient in roots, is still part of the belief system of many religions. The word "exorcism" means "I cause [someone] to swear," referring to the exorcist forcing the spirit to obey a higher power.

== F ==
- Faith healing: The use of solely spiritual means in treating disease, sometimes accompanied with the refusal of modern medical techniques. Another term for this is spiritual healing. Faith healing is a form of alternative medicine.
- Fasting: The act of willingly abstaining from all food and in some cases drink, for a period of time. Depending on the tradition, fasting practices may forbid sexual intercourse, (or any sexual desire), masturbation, as well as refraining from eating certain types or groups of food (e.g. meat).

Fasting for religious and spiritual reasons has been a part of human custom since pre-history. It is mentioned in the Qur'an, in the Mahabharata, in the Upanishads, and in the Bible, in both the Old and New Testament.

== G ==
- Gender generally relates aspects of masculine (assertive) and feminine (nurturing) behavior. Although in languages with only two genders (notably Romance and Arabic) use of the masculine pronoun before God/Allah is usual and often grammatically necessary that does not imply divine gender. Ascribing natural gender or male sexuality to The Almighty may considered heretical, especially in Islam. ( Quran:Surah Ash-Shuraa – 42:11). In Christianity, Jesus may be considered the archetypal gentleman because he bravely challenged deviant authority figures (Matthew 12:1 & 21:12-13) yet gently treated the sick and oppressed (Matthew 4:23-5:20)..
- Ghost is the ephemeral reappearance or phenomenon in the present of past events, probably resulting from a present trigger to some past traumatic experience or collective memory. The Holy Ghost of Christianity is manifest "...wherever two or three gather together…" (Matthew 18:20. This is distinct from the Holy Spirit, which is a force similar to the Islamic concept of Allah, which denies the Anthropomorphism of the Christian Trinity
- Glossolalia: (from the Greek, "γλώσσα" (glossa), tongue and "λαλώ" (lalô), to speak) comprises the utterance of what appears (to the casual listener) either as an unknown foreign language (xenoglossia), meaningless syllables, or utterance of an unknown mystical language; the utterances sometimes occur as part of religious worship (religious glossolalia) and are commonly referred to in such circles as "speaking in tongues".
- Gnosticism: A blanket term for various mystical initiatory religions, sects and knowledge schools, which were most prominent in the first few centuries AD. It is also applied to modern revivals of these groups and, sometimes, by analogy to all religious movements based on secret knowledge gnosis, thus can lead to confusion.
- God: The term God is capitalized in the English language as if it were a proper noun but without an object because it is in linguistics a boundless enigma as is the mathematical concept of infinity. God is used to refer to a specific monotheistic concept of a supernatural Supreme Being in accordance with the tradition of Abrahamic religions. God is not a name and to preserve the enigma of God as concept beyond human conception it is sometimes written "G-d" to avoid objectification (God as an idea not an object).
- Gods and Goddess: are male and female deities in polytheistic religions. They are anthropomorphic conceptual super-beings with powers, responsibilities and privileges that are limited, but beings that are worthy of worship or sacrifice in exchange for benefits, in contrast to the omnipotent concept of monotheism described above,
- Great Awakenings: Commonly said to be periods of religious revival in Anglo-American religious history. They have also been described as periodic revolutions in American religious thought. The Great Awakenings appear to form a cycle, with a period of roughly 80 years. There are three generally accepted Great Awakenings in American history: The First Great Awakening (1730s - 1740s); The Second Great Awakening (1820s - 1830s); The Third Great Awakening (1880s - 1900s).
- Sri Guru Granth Sahib Ji (Punjabi: ਸ੍ਰੀ ਗੁਰੂ ਗ੍ਰੰਥ ਸਾਹਿਬ ਜੀ): Granth is Punjabi for book; Sahib is Hindi meaning master, from Arabic, meaning companion, friend, owner, or master – is more than a holy book of the Sikhs. The Sikhs treat this Granth (holy book) as a living Guru. The holy text spans 1430 pages and contains the actual words spoken by the founders of the Sikh religion and various other Saints from other religions including Hinduism and Islam.
- Guru: (Sanskrit: गुरू, Punjabi: ਗੁਰੂ) A teacher in Hinduism, Buddhism or Sikhism. Based on a long line of philosophical understanding as to the importance of knowledge, the guru is seen in these religions as a sacred conduit, or a way to self-realization. In India and among people of Hindu, Buddhist, or Sikh belief, the title retains a hallowed meaning.

Guru also refers in Sanskrit to Brihaspati, a Hindu figure analogous to the Roman planet/god Jupiter. In Vedic astrology, Jupiter/Guru/Brihaspati is believed to exert teaching influences. Indeed, in many Indian languages, such as Hindi, the occidental Thursday is called either Brihaspativaar or Guruvaar (vaar meaning period or day).
In contemporary India and Indonesia, guru is widely used within the general meaning of "teacher". In Western usage, the original meaning of guru has been extended to cover anyone who acquires followers, and not necessarily in an established school of philosophy or religion. In a further metaphorical extension, guru is used of a person who has authority because of his or her perceived knowledge or skills in a domain of expertise.
The importance of discerning between a true guru and a false one is explored in scriptures and teachings of religions in which a guru plays a role. The assessment and criticism of gurus and the Guru-shishya tradition are espoused in the discourse about cults and new religious movements by Western secular scholars, theologians, anti-cultists, and by skeptics both in the West and in India.

== H ==
- Hymn: A song specifically written as a song of praise, adoration or prayer, typically addressed to a god.

A writer of hymns is known as a hymnist or hymnodist, and the process of singing a hymn is called hymnody; the same word is used for the collectivity of hymns belonging to a particular denomination or period (e.g. "nineteenth century Methodist hymnody" would mean the body of hymns written and/or used by Methodists in the nineteenth century). Books called hymnals are collections of hymns, which may or may not include music.
Ancient hymns include the Great Hymn to the Aten, composed by the pharaoh Akhenaten, and the Vedas, a collection of hymns in the tradition of Hinduism. The Western tradition of hymnody begins with the Homeric Hymns, a collection of ancient Greek hymns, the oldest of which were written in the 7th century BCE in praise of the gods of Greek mythology.

== I ==
- I Ching: The oldest of the Chinese classic texts. It describes an ancient system of cosmology and philosophy which is at the heart of Chinese cultural beliefs. The philosophy centers on the ideas of the dynamic balance of opposites, the evolution of events as a process, and acceptance of the inevitability of change (see Philosophy, below). In Western cultures, the I Ching is regarded by some as simply a system of divination; others believe it expresses the wisdom and philosophy of ancient China.
- Iconolatry: (from the two Greek terms eikon denoting simply a picture or image, and latreia to adore or worship) Icon in Greek simply denotes a picture but has now come to be closely associated with religious art used by the Eastern Orthodox and the Catholic Churches. Icons are used by Eastern Orthodox Churches to assist in prayer and worship of God. Icon (image) is the same word used in the Bible in Genesis 1:27, Colossians 1:15.
- Inner peace: (or peace of mind) A colloquialism that refers to a state of being mentally or spiritually at peace, with enough knowledge and understanding to keep oneself strong in the face of discord or stress. Being "at peace" is considered by many to be healthy (homeostasis) and the opposite of being stressed or anxious. Peace of mind is generally associated with bliss and happiness. Most religious people believe that it is only truly possible to achieve inner peace with divine intervention of some form or another.

Peace of mind, serenity, and calmness are descriptions of a disposition free from the effects of stress. In some cultures, inner peace is considered a state of consciousness that may be cultivated by various forms of training, such as prayer, meditation, tai chi or yoga, for example. Many spiritual practices refer to this peace as an experience of knowing oneself.

- Integrity: Comprises the personal inner sense of "wholeness" deriving from honesty and consistent uprightness of character. The etymology of the word relates it to the Latin adjective integer (whole, complete). Evaluators, of course, usually assess integrity from some point of view, such as that of a given ethical tradition or in the context of an ethical relationship.
- Involution: the process by which the Divine manifests the cosmos is called involution. The process by which the creation rises to higher states and states of consciousness is the evolution. Involution prepares the universe for the Big Bang; evolution continues from that point forward. The term involution comes from the idea that the divine involves itself in creation.

After the creation, the Divine (i.e. the Absolute, Brahman, God; all these essentially mean the same thing) is both the One (the Creator) and the Many (that which was created).

== J ==
- Japa: (or Japam) A spiritual discipline in which a devotee repeats a mantra or the name of the God. The repetition can be aloud or just the movement of lips or in the mind. This spiritual practice is present in the major religions of world. This is considered as one of the most effective spiritual practices.
- Jihad: (Arabic: جهاد jihād) An Islamic term, from the Arabic root jhd ("to exert utmost effort, to strive, struggle"), which connotes a wide range of meanings: anything from an inward spiritual struggle to attain perfect faith to a political or military struggle to further the Islamic cause. The meaning of "Islamic cause" is of course open to interpretation. The term is frequently mistranslated into English as "holy war", although jihad can apply to warfare. Mainstream Muslims consider jihad to be the most misunderstood aspect of their religion by non-Muslims. The Islamic religious legitimacy of the goals or methods of various Islamist movements who adopt the terminology of jihad is often brought into question, usually by moderate and liberal Muslims.

== K ==
- Karma: (Sanskrit: कर्म from the root kri, "to do", meaning deed) or Kamma (Pali: meaning action, effect, destiny) A term in several Indian religions that comprises the entire cycle of cause and effect. Karma is a sum of all that an individual has done and is currently doing. The effects of those deeds actively create present and future experiences, thus making one responsible for one's own life. In religions that incorporate reincarnation, karma extends through one's present life and all past and future lives as well.
- Koan: A story, dialog, question, or statement in the history and lore of Chan (Zen) Buddhism, generally containing aspects that are inaccessible to rational understanding, yet that may be accessible to Intuition. Koans are often used by Zen practitioners as objects of meditation to induce an experience of enlightenment or realization, and by Zen teachers as testing questions when a student wishes to validate their experience of enlightenment.

== L ==
- Love: Has many different meanings in English, from something that gives a little pleasure ("I loved that meal") to something one would die for (patriotism, pairbonding). It can describe an intense feeling of affection, an emotion or an emotional state. In ordinary use, it usually refers to interpersonal love. Probably due to its psychological relevance, love is one of the most common themes in art.

Just as there are many types of lovers, there are many kinds of love. Love is inherent in all human cultures. It is precisely these cultural differences that make any universal definition of love difficult to establish. See the Sapir–Whorf hypothesis.
Expressions of love may include the love for a "soul" or mind, the love of laws and organizations, love for a body, love for nature, love of food, love of money, love for learning, love of power, love of fame, love for the respect of others, et cetera. Different people place varying degrees of importance on the kinds of love they receive. Love is essentially an abstract concept, easier to experience than to explain.

== M ==
- Mantra: A religious syllable or poem, typically from the Sanskrit language. Their use varies according to the school and philosophy associated with the mantra. They are primarily used as spiritual conduits, words and vibrations that instill one-pointed concentration in the devotee. Other purposes have included religious ceremonies to accumulate wealth, avoid danger, or eliminate enemies. Mantras originated in India with Vedic Hinduism and were later adopted by Buddhists and Jains, now popular in various modern forms of spiritual practice which are loosely based on practices of these Eastern religions.
- Meaning of life: The question “What is the meaning of life?” means different things to different people. The ambiguity of the query is inherent in the word “meaning”, which opens the question to many interpretations, such as: “What is the origin of life?”, “What is the nature of life (and of the universe in which we live)?”, “What is the significance of life?”, “What is valuable in life?”, and “What is the purpose of, or in, (one's) life?”. These questions have resulted in a wide range of competing answers and arguments, from practical scientific theories, to philosophical, theological and spiritual explanations. Similar questions people ask themselves about the origin and purpose of life are “Why am I here?” and “Why are we here?”.
- Meditation: Refers to any of a wide variety of spiritual practices (and their close secular analogues) which emphasize mental activity or quiescence. The English word comes from the Latin meditatio, which could perhaps be better translated as "contemplation." This usage is found in Christian spirituality, for example, when one "meditates" on the sufferings of Christ; as well as Western philosophy, as in René Descartes's Meditations on First Philosophy, a set of six mental exercises which systematically analyze the nature of reality.

In the late nineteenth century, Theosophists adopted "meditation" to refer to various spiritual practices drawn from Hinduism, Buddhism, and other Eastern religions. Thus the English word "meditation" does not exclusively translate any single term or concept from the sacred languages of Asia, such as the Sanskrit dhyana, samādhi, or pranayama. (Note that whereas in Eastern religions meditation is often a central part of religious/spiritual practice, in Christianity it is rather a fringe activity if practised at all.)

- Metaphysics: (Greek words meta = after/beyond and physics = nature) A branch of philosophy concerned with the study of "first principles" and "being" (ontology). Problems that were not originally considered metaphysical have been added to metaphysics. Other problems that were considered metaphysical problems for centuries are now typically relegated to their own separate subheadings in philosophy, such as philosophy of religion, philosophy of mind, philosophy of perception, philosophy of language, and philosophy of science. In rare cases subjects of metaphysical research have been found to be entirely physical and natural, thus making them part of physics.
- Mind's eye: (or third eye) A phrase used to refer to one's ability to "see" things (such as visions) with the mind. This is, essentially, a reference to imagination and memory, although it can have religious or occult connotations. Also, the term "third eye" has been associated with the Pineal gland.
- Miracle: According to many religions, a miracle, derived from the Latin word miraculum meaning 'something wonderful', is a striking interposition of divine intervention by God in the universe by which the operations of the ordinary course of Nature are overruled, suspended, or modified. One must keep in mind that in Judaism, Christianity, Islam and in other faiths people have substantially different definitions of the word miracle. Even within a specific religion there is often more than one usage of the term.

Sometimes the term miracle may refer to the action of a supernatural being that is not a god. Then the term divine intervention refers specifically to the direct involvement of a deity.

- Moksha: (Sanskrit: मोक्ष, liberation) or Mukti (Sanskrit: विमुक्ति, release) Refers, in general, to liberation from the cycle of death and rebirth. In higher Hindu philosophy, it is seen as a transcendence of phenomenal being, of any sense of consciousness of time, space, and causation (karma). It is not seen as a soteriological goal in the same sense as in, say, a Christian context, but signifies dissolution of the sense of self, or ego, and the overall breakdown of nama-roopa (name-form). It is, in Hinduism, viewed as analogous to Nirvana, though Buddhist thought tends to differ with even the Advaita Vedantist reading of liberation. Jainism and Surat Shabda Yoga traditions also believe in Moksha.
- Muraqaba: The Sufi word for meditation. Literally it means "to watch over", "to take care of" or "to keep an eye". Metaphorically, it implies that with meditation, a person watches over or takes care of his spiritual heart (or soul), and acquires knowledge about it, its surroundings and its creator.
- Mysticism: From the Greek μυω (mueo, "to conceal"), is the pursuit of achieving communion with or conscious awareness of ultimate reality, the divine, spiritual truth, or God through direct, personal experience (intuition or insight) rather than rational thought; the belief in the existence of realities beyond perceptual or intellectual apprehension that are central to being and directly accessible through personal experience; or the belief that such experience is a genuine and important source of knowledge. In the Hellenistic world, "mystical" referred to secret religious rituals.

== N ==
- Nasma: A body made of the purest form of light (called Noor) which is more pure than any visible color. Shah Wali Ullah was the first who give hints about this body. Qalandar Baba Auliya give its more details while Khwaja Shamsuddin Azeemi thoroughly described that body. This body is actually that is controlling the human physical body. The lights coming from Nasma to material body are visible only through Kirlian photography.
- Neopaganism: (sometimes Neo-Paganism) Describes a heterogeneous group of new religious movements which attempt to revive ancient, mainly pre-Christian and often pre-Judaic Indo-European religions. As the name implies, these religions are Pagan in nature, though their exact relationship to older forms of Paganism is the source of much contention.
- New Age: Describes a broad movement of late twentieth century and contemporary Western culture characterised by an individual eclectic approach to spiritual exploration. It has some attributes of a new, emerging religion but is currently a loose network of spiritual seekers, teachers, healers and other participants. The name "New Age" also refers to the market segment in which goods and services are sold to people in the movement.
- Nirvana: In the Indian religions Buddhism, Jainism and Hinduism, nirvāna (from the Sanskrit निर्वाण, Pali: Nibbāna -- Chinese: 涅槃; Pinyin: niè pán), literally "extinction" and/or "extinguishing", is the culmination of the yogi's pursuit of liberation. Siddhartha Gautama, the Buddha, described the Dharma as a raft which, after floating across a river, will enable the passenger to reach nirvana. Hinduism and Jainism also use the word nirvana to describe the state of moksha, and it is spoken of in several Hindu tantric texts as well as the Bhagavad Gita.
- Nondualism: The belief that dualism or dichotomy are illusory phenomenae. Examples of dualisms include self/other, mind/body, male/female, good/evil, active/passive, and many others. A nondual philosophical or religious perspective or theory maintains that there is no fundamental distinction between mind and matter, or that the entire phenomenological world is an illusion (with the reality being described variously as the Void, the Is, Emptiness, or the Mind of God).

== P ==
- Pandeism: (Greek pan=all, en=in and Latin Deus=God; "all-in-God") is a term generally used to describe philosophical systems, often mixing elements of pantheism and deism. This use has been inconsistent over time.
- Panentheism (Greek words: pan=all, en=in and Theos=God; "all-in-God") is the view that God is both immanent within all creation, and also maintains a transcendent character.
- Pantheism: (Greek: pan = all and Theos = God) Literally means "God is All" and "All is God". It is the view that everything is of an all-encompassing immanent God; or that the universe, or nature, and God are equivalent. More detailed definitions tend to emphasize the idea that natural law, existence and/or the universe (the sum total of all that it was and shall be) is represented or personified in the theological principle of 'God'.
- Parapsychology: The study of the evidence involving phenomena where a person seems to affect or to gain information about something through a means not currently explainable within the framework of mainstream, conventional science. Proponents of the existence of these phenomena usually consider them to be a product of unexplained mental abilities.
- Physical universe: The part of the universe composed of matter, as opposed to a spiritual or supernatural essence.
- Pilgrimage: A term primarily used in religion and spirituality of a long journey or search of great moral significance. Sometimes, it is a journey to a sacred place or shrine of importance to a person's beliefs and faith. Members of every religion participate in pilgrimages. A person who makes such a journey is called a pilgrim.

- Plane: In metaphysics and esoteric cosmology, a plane of existence (sometimes called simply a plane, dimension, vibrating plane, or an inner, invisible, spiritual, supraphysical world or egg) is a theoretical region of space and/or consciousness beyond the known physical universe, or the region containing the universe itself. Many esoteric teachings (e.g., theosophy and rosicrucianism) propound the idea of a whole series of subtle planes or worlds or dimensions which, from a center, interpenetrate themselves and the physical planet in which we live, the solar systems, and all the physical structures of the universe. This interpenetration of planes culminates in the universe itself as a physical structured, dynamic and evolutive expression emanated – through a series of stages, becoming progressively more material and embodied – from The Supreme Being: which allows from Itself the irruption of auto-Singularities, as the Big Bang, originated from Its unintelligible Chaos.
- Prayer: An effort to communicate with God, or to some deity or deities, or another form of spiritual entity, or otherwise, either to offer praise, to make a request, or simply to express one's thoughts and emotions.
- Prophecy: In a broad sense, is the prediction of future events. The etymology of the word is ultimately Greek, from pro- "before" plus the root of phanai "speak", i. e. "speaking before" or "foretelling", but prophecy often implies the involvement of supernatural phenomena, whether it is communication with a deity, the reading of magical signs, or astrology. It is also used as a general term for the revelation of divine will.

Throughout history, people have sought knowledge of future events from special individuals or groups who were thought to have the gift of prophecy, such as Oracles at Delphi in ancient Greece. Cultures in which prophecy played an important role include the North American Indians, Mayans, Celts, Druids, Chinese, Chaldeans, Assyrians, Egyptians, Hindus, Hebrews, Tibetans, Greeks, and many in the Christian tradition, among others.

== Q ==
- Qi: Also commonly spelled ch'i, chi or ki, is a fundamental concept of everyday Chinese culture, most often defined as "air" or "breath" (for example, the colloquial Mandarin Chinese term for "weather" is tiān qi, or the "breath of heaven") and, by extension, "life force" or "spiritual energy" that is part of everything that exists. References to qi or similar philosophical concepts as a type of metaphysical energy that sustains living beings are used in many belief systems, especially in Asia.
- Qigong: (simplified Chinese: 气功; traditional Chinese: 氣功; pinyin: qìgōng; Wade–Giles: ch'i^{4} kung^{1}) An increasingly popular aspect of Chinese medicine involving the coordination of different breathing patterns with various physical postures and motions of the body. Qigong is mostly taught for health maintenance purposes, but there are also some who teach it, especially in China, for therapeutic interventions. Various forms of traditional qigong are also widely taught in conjunction with Chinese martial arts, and are especially prevalent in the advanced training of what are known as the neijia (internal martial arts).

== R ==
- Reality: In everyday usage means "everything that exists." The term "Reality," in its most liberal sense, includes everything that is, whether or not it is observable, accessible or understandable by science, philosophy, theology or any other system of analysis. Reality in this sense may include both being and nothingness, whereas "existence" is often restricted to being.
- Reincarnation: As a doctrine or mystical belief, holds the notion that one's 'Spirit' ('Soul' depending on interpretation), 'Higher or True Self', 'Divine Spark', 'I' or 'Ego' (not to be confused with the ego as defined by psychology) or critical parts of these returns to the material world after physical death to be reborn in a new body. The natural process is considered integrative of all experiences from each lifetime. A new personality feature, with the associated character, is developed during each life in the physical world, based upon past integrated experience and new acquired experiences. Some Reincarnation theories express that usually rebirth is made each time in alternated female and male type of bodies. Also that there is interaction between pre-determinism of certain experiences or lessons intended to happen during the physical life, and the free will action of the individual as they live that life.
- Religion: Sometimes used interchangeably with faith or belief system—is commonly defined as belief concerning the supernatural, sacred, or divine; and the moral codes, practices, values, institutions and rituals associated with such belief. In its broadest sense some have defined it as the sum total of answers given to explain humankind's relationship with the universe. In the course of the development of religion, it has taken many forms in various cultures and individuals. Occasionally, the word "religion" is used to designate what should be more properly described as "organized religion" – that is, an organization of people supporting the exercise of some religion, often taking the form of a legal entity (see religion-supporting organization). There are many different religions in the world today.
- Religious ecstasy: A trance-like state characterized by expanded mental and spiritual awareness and is frequently accompanied by visions, hallucinations, and physical euphoria. Such an experience usually lasts about a half-hour. However, there are many records of such experiences lasting several days, and some people claim to have experienced ecstasy over a period of over three decades, or to have recurring experiences of ecstasy during their lifetime.
- Repentance: The feeling and act in which one recognizes and tries to right a wrong, or gain forgiveness from someone that they wronged. In religious contexts it usually refers to repenting for a sin against God. It always includes an admission of guilt, and also includes at least one of: a solemn promise or resolve not to repeat the offense; an attempt to make restitution for the wrong, or in some way to reverse the harmful effects of the wrong where possible.
- Revelation: Refers to an uncovering or disclosure of that which had been previously wholly or partly hidden via communication from the divine. In monotheistic religions, revelation is the process in which God makes himself, his will, and/or other information known to mankind. The recipient of revelation is commonly referred to as a prophet, and sometimes is termed a messenger.

There are a number of ways that religious thinkers have traditionally approached this topic; many widely differing views have been proposed. Generally speaking, one can find all of the following viewpoints in varying segments of Judaism and in varying groups within Christianity.

- Revivalism: A revival is the apparent restoration of a living creature from a dead state to a living state. In a New Testament story, Lazarus was revived by divine intervention. In religious terms, Revival is the substitution of religious fervor in life and worship, for an intellectualized, pragmatic approach to everyday conduct (often stigmatized by revivalists as 'pride').
- Ritual: A formalised, predetermined set of symbolic actions generally performed in a particular environment at a regular, recurring interval. The set of actions that comprise a ritual often include, but are not limited to, such things as recitation, singing, group processions, repetitive dance, manipulation of sacred objects, etc. The general purpose of rituals is to express some fundamental truth or meaning, evoke spiritual, numinous emotional responses from participants, and/or engage a group of people in unified action to strengthen their communal bonds. The word ritual, when used as an adjective, relates to the noun 'rite', as in rite of passage.

== S ==
- Sacrifice: (from a Middle English verb meaning 'to make sacred', from Old French, from Latin sacrificium : sacer, sacred; sacred + facere, to make) Commonly known as the practice of offering food, or the lives of animals or people to the gods, as an act of propitiation or worship. The term is also used metaphorically to describe selfless good deeds for others.
- Sadhana: Spiritual exercise by a Sadhu or a Sadhaka to attain a desired goal. The goal of sadhana is to attain some stage, which can be either moksha, liberation from the cycle of birth and death (Samsara), or a particular goal such as the blessing by a deity through his or her appearance before the Sadhaka at the end of the limited Sadhana. Sadhana can involve meditation, puja to a deity, namasmarana (sometimes with the help of a japa mala), mortification of the flesh or unorthodox practices such as in a smashana sadhana on a cremation ground. Each type of Yoga entails its own type of sadhana. To embark on a sadhana, a guru is required to give one the necessary know-how and the seed for the future result, in the form of some diksha, initiation, which he or she has received from his or her guru.
- Saint: Generally refers to someone who is exceptionally virtuous and holy. It can be applied to both the living and the dead and is an acceptable term in most of the world's popular religions. The Saint is held up by the community as an example of how we all should act, and his or her life story is usually recorded for the edification of future generations.

The process of officially recognizing a person as a Saint, practiced by some churches, is called canonization, though many Protestant groups use the less formal, broader usage seen in Scripture to include all who are faithful as saints.

- Salvation: Refers to deliverance from undesirable state or condition. In theology, the study of salvation is called soteriology and is a vitally important concept in several religions. Christianity regards salvation as deliverance from the bondage of sin and from condemnation, resulting in eternal life with God.
- Satguru: (or Sadguru) Means true guru (Sanskrit सदगुरू sat=true), literally: true teacher. The title means that his students have faith that the guru can be trusted and will lead them to liberation or inner peace. It is based on a long line of Hindu philosophical understandings of the importance of knowledge and that the teacher, guru, is the sacred conduit to self-realization.
- SBNR: Acronym used by individuals who define themselves as Spiritual But Not Religious.
- Seven Virtues: Derived from the Psychomachia, an epic poem written by Prudentius (c. 410). Practicing these virtues is alleged to protect one against temptation toward the Seven Deadly Sins. The Seven Virtues considered by the Roman Catholic church are those of humility, meekness, charity, chastity, moderation, zeal and generosity. These are considered to be the polar opposite of the seven deadly sins, namely pride, wrath, envy, lust, gluttony, sloth and greed.
- Shabd: (or Shabda) Literally means “sound” or “word” in Sanskrit. Esoterically, Shabd is the “Sound Current vibrating in all creation. It can be heard by the inner ears.” Variously referred to as the Audible Life Stream, Inner Sound, Sound Current or Word in English, the Shabd is the esoteric essence of God which is available to all human beings, according to the Shabd path teachings of Eckankar, the Quan Yin Method, Sant Mat and Surat Shabd Yoga.

Adherents believe that a Satguru, or ECK Master, who is a human being, has merged with the Shabd in such a manner that he or she is a living manifestation of it at its highest level (the “Word made flesh”). However, not only can the Satguru can attain this, but all human beings are inherently privileged in this way. Indeed, in Sant Mat the raison d’être for the human form is to meditate on the Sound Current, and in so doing merge with it until one’s own divinity is ultimately realized.

- Shamanism: Refers to the traditional healing and religious practices of Northern Asia (Siberia) and Mongolia. By extension, the concept of shamanism has been extended in common language to a range of traditional beliefs and practices that involve the ability to diagnose, cure, and sometimes cause human suffering by traversing the axis mundi and forming a special relationship with, or gaining control over, spirits. Shamans have been credited with the ability to control the weather, divination, the interpretation of dreams, astral projection, and traveling to upper and lower worlds. Shamanistic traditions have existed throughout the world since prehistoric times.
- Shinto: (神道 Shintō) (sometimes called Shintoism) A native religion of Japan and was once its state religion. It involves the worship of kami, which can be translated to mean gods, spirits of nature, or just spiritual presences. Some kami are local and can be regarded as the spirit or genius of a particular place, but others represent major natural objects and processes, for example, Amaterasu, the Sun goddess. The word Shinto was created by combining two kanji: "神" shin meaning god (the character can also be read as "kami" in Japanese) and "道" tō meaning Tao ("way" or "path" in a philosophical sense). Thus, Shinto means "the way of the gods."

After World War II, Shinto lost its status of state religion; some Shinto practices and teachings, once given a great deal of prominence during the war, are no longer taught nor practiced today, and some remain largely as everyday activities without religious connotations like omikuji (a form of sortition).

- Shunyata: (Śūnyatā, शून्यता (Sanskrit, Pali: suññatā), or "Emptiness") In Buddhist metaphysical critique and Buddhist epistemology and phenomenology, shunyata signifies that everything one encounters in life is empty of soul, permanence, and self-nature. Everything is inter-related, never self-sufficient or independent; nothing has independent reality. Yet shunyata never connotes nihilism, which Buddhist doctrine considers to be a delusion, just as it considers materialism to be a delusion.
- Simran: 'Simran', derived from the word 'Smarana,' (from Sanskrit), means: remembering or contemplating on the highest – that which should be valued in memory, in general. It teaches that: everything changes while inner and outer purity naturally happen. Smarana does not project about restriction through God or religion. It shows that remembering the highest aspect of life that one has seen will eventually open up what's important to an individual.
- Soul: The soul, according to many religious and philosophical traditions, is the ethereal substance – arising from Spirit of a human being that is capable of surviving immortally. In (Hebrew:rooah or nefesh) – indicates a signpost to particular, unique, formerly living being. Such traditions often consider the soul to be not merely immortal, but innately aware of its true purpose of its former sentience in eternity within some heavenly plan. (But see also Ghost)

The concept of the soul has strong links with notions of an afterlife, but opinions may vary wildly, even within a given religion, as to what happens to the soul after death. Many within these religions and philosophies see the soul as immaterial, while others consider it possibly material.

- Spirit may have its roots in the Proto-Indo-European word for breath represents the tangible essence of humanity represented by personal willpower, morality and volition as well social imperatives such ethical duty . The spirit is sometimes characterized as charisma or which makes a person truly human. A similar significance has been attributed to human blood. Spirit has thus evolved to denote that which separates a living body from a corpse (see soul for afterlife spirit). Spirit can be used metaphorically (as in team spirit or "She performed the piece with spirit" alternatively "She put up a spirited defence") spirit can also be synonym for such words as vivacity.
- Spiritism: A religious and philosophic doctrine established in France in the mid-19th century by Allan Kardec. The term was coined by him as the specific name of the doctrine he was about to publish but, given the fact that the word was created from roots taken from the common language, it was soon incorporated into the normal use and has been used to name other doctrines as well, though the authentic Spiritists protest against this usage.

During the late 19th century, many well educated people from Europe and the United States embraced Spiritism as a logical explanation of themes related to the Christian Revelation. Most of the initial enthusiasm receded, while in some places the work of a few dedicated preachers managed to achieve a solid foundation.
Spiritism is not to be confused with spiritualism. Its use with that meaning is regarded as pejorative by both Spiritualists and Spiritists. Uncapitalised, the word, in English, is an obsolete term for animism and other religious practices involving the invocation of spiritual beings, including shamanism.

- Spiritual evolution: The philosophical/theological/esoteric idea that nature and human beings and/or human culture evolve along a predetermined cosmological pattern or ascent, or in accordance with certain pre-determined potentials. Predeterminism of evolution concept is also complemented with the idea of a creative impulse of human beings, known as epigenesis.

Within this broad definition, theories of spiritual evolution are very diverse. They may be cosmological (describing existence at large), personal (describing the development of the individual), or both. They can be holistic (holding that higher realities emerge from and are not reducible to the lower), idealist (holding that reality is primarily mental or spiritual) or nondual (holding that there is no ultimate distinction between mental and physical reality). All of them can be considered to be teleological to a greater or lesser degree.

- Spiritualism: May refer to a variety of modern religious ideologies, primarily active in the United States and Europe. Central tenets of Spiritualist liturgy and dogma are the beliefs and practices of mediumship which purports to be evidence of the continued existence of an individual's spirit or soul after death. The origin of Spiritualism is commonly considered to be the Modern Spiritualist movement of the 19th century United States.
- Spirituality: In a narrow sense, is a concern with matters of the spirit, however that may be defined; but it is also a wide term with many available readings. It may include belief in supernatural powers, as in religion, but the emphasis is on personal experience. It may be an expression for life perceived as higher, more complex or more integrated with one's worldview, as contrasted with the merely sensual.
- Sufi whirling: The practice of Sufi whirling (or Sufi spinning), is a twirling meditation that originated among the ancient Indian mystics and Turkish Sufis, which is still practiced by the Dervishes of the Mevlevi order. Following a recommended fast of several hours, Sufi whirlers begin with hands crossed onto shoulders and may return their hands to this position if they feel dizzy. They rotate on their left feet in short twists, using the right foot to drive their bodies around the left foot. The left foot is like an anchor to the ground, so that if the whirler loses his or her balance, he or she can think of their left foot, direct attention towards it and regain balance back.
- Sufism: (Arabic تصوف taṣawwuf) A mystic tradition of Islam, which is based on the pursuit of spiritual truth as a definite goal to attain. In modern language it might also be referred to as Islamic spirituality or Islamic mysticism. While fiqh focuses on the legal aspects of Islam, Sufism focuses on the internal aspects of Islam, such as perfecting the aspect of sincerity of faith and fighting one's ego. Sufi practitioners are organized into a diverse range of brotherhoods and sisterhoods, with a wide diversity of thought. Sufi orders ("tariqas") can be Shi'a, Sunni, both or neither.
- Supplication: (also known as petitioning) The most common form of prayer, wherein a person asks a supernatural deity to provide something, either for that person who is praying or for someone else on whose behalf a prayer of supplication is being made. One example of supplication is the Catholic ritual of novena (from novem, the Latin word for "nine") wherein one repeatedly asks for the same favor over a period of nine days. This ritual began in France and Spain during the Middle Ages when a nine-day period of hymns and prayers led up to a Christmas feast, a period which ended with gift giving. In Islam, the Arabic word du'a is often used for supplication. Du'a may be made in any language, although there are many traditional Islamic supplications in Arabic, Persian and Turkish.

== T ==
- Tao Te Ching: (Chinese: 道德經, Dào dé jīng) Roughly translated as The Book of the Way and its Virtue (see article on translating the title) is an ancient Chinese scripture. Tradition has it that the book was written around 600 BCE by a sage called Laozi (WG: Lao Tzu, "Old Master"), a record-keeper in the Emperor's Court of the Zhou dynasty. A careful reading of the text, however, suggests that it is a compilation of maxims sharing similar themes. The authenticity of the date of composition/compilation and the authorship are still debated.
- Tenrikyo: (天理教; Tenrikyō, lit. Teaching of Divine Reason, also known as Tenriism) A religion of Japanese Shinto origin with some Buddhist influence. It was founded by a female peasant, Nakayama Miki, who underwent a revelatory experience from 1838 onwards. After this date she is referred to as Oyasama (lit. Honoured Parent) by followers. Tenrikyo is estimated to have about 2 million followers worldwide with 1.5 million of those in Japan.
- Theism: The belief in one or more gods or goddesses. More specifically, it may also mean the belief in God, a god, or gods, who is/are actively involved in maintaining the Universe. This secondary meaning is shown in context to other beliefs concerning the divine. The term is attested in English from 1678, and was probably coined to contrast with atheism attested from ca. 1587.
- Theosis: In Eastern Orthodox and Eastern Catholic theology, theosis, meaning divinization (or woodenly, deification or, to become god), is the call to man to become holy and seek union with God, beginning in this life and later consummated in the resurrection. Theosis comprehends salvation from sin, is premised upon apostolic and early Christian understanding of the life of faith, and is conceptually foundational in both the East and the West.
- Tithe: (from Old English teogotha "tenth") A one-tenth part of something, paid as a voluntary contribution or as a tax or levy, usually to support a Jewish or Christian religious organization. Today, tithes (or tithing) are normally voluntary and paid in cash or checks, whereas historically tithes could be paid in kind, such as agricultural products. There are still European countries today that allow some churches to assess a mandatory tithe which is enforced by law.
- Torah: (תורה) A Hebrew word meaning "teaching," "instruction," or "law." It is the central and most important document of Judaism revered by Jews through the ages. It primarily refers to the first section of the Tanakh—the first five books of the Hebrew Bible, but the term is sometimes also used in the general sense to also include both of Judaism's written law and oral law, encompassing the entire spectrum of authoritative Jewish religious teachings throughout history, including the Mishnah, the Talmud, the midrash, and more.
- Transcendentalism: The name of a group of new ideas in literature, religion, culture, and philosophy that advocates that there is an ideal spiritual state that 'transcends' the physical and empirical and is only realized through a knowledgeable intuitive awareness that is conditional upon the individual. The concept emerged in New England in the early-to mid-nineteenth century. It is sometimes called "American Transcendentalism" to distinguish it from other uses of the word transcendental. It began as a protest against the general state of culture and society at the time, and in particular, the state of intellectualism at Harvard and the doctrine of the Unitarian church which was taught at Harvard Divinity School.

== U ==
- Unitarian Universalism: (UU or UUism) A theologically liberal, inclusive religion formed by the merger of Unitarian and Universalist organizations in the mid-20th century. UUs generally: cherish creativity, freedom, and compassion; embrace diversity and interconnectedness; and promote personal spiritual growth and justice-making through worship, fellowship, personal experience, social action, deeds, and education. While one UU may differ from another in personal creed, the term UU is a distinct theological signifier and Unitarianism or Universalism should not be confused or interchanged with Unitarian Universalism.

== V ==
- Veneration: In traditional Christian churches (for example, Catholicism and Eastern Orthodoxy), veneration (Latin veneratio, Greek δουλια dulia), or veneration of saints, is a special act of honoring a dead person who has been identified as singular in the traditions of the religion, and through them honoring God who made them and in whose image they are made. Veneration is often shown outwardly by respectfully bowing or making the sign of the cross before a saint's icon, relics, or cult image. These items are often also kissed.
- Vipassana: (Sanskrit: vipasyanā) The practice of Insight Meditation. While it is often referred to as Buddhist meditation, the practice taught by the Buddha was non-sectarian, and has a universal application. It does not require conversion to Buddhism. While the meditation practices themselves vary from school to school, the underlying principle is the investigation of phenomena (Sanskrit: dharmas) as they manifest in the five aggregates (Skandha) namely, matter or form (Rupa), sensation or feelings (Vedana), perception (Samjna), mental formations (Sankara) & consciousness (Vijnana). This process leads to direct experiential perception, Vipassanā.

== W ==
- Wabi-sabi: (in Kanji: 侘寂) Represents a comprehensive Japanese world view or aesthetic. It is difficult to explain wabi-sabi in Western terms, but the aesthetic is sometimes described as one of beauty that is imperfect, impermanent, or incomplete. A concept derived from the Buddhist assertion of the first noble truth—Dukkha.
- Worship: Usually refers to specific acts of religious praise, honour, or devotion, typically directed to a supernatural being such as a god or goddess. It is the informal term in English for what sociologists of religion call cultus, the body of practices and traditions that correspond to theology. Religious worship may be performed individually, in informally organized groups, or as part of an organized service with a designated leader (as in a church, synagogue, temple, or mosque). In its older sense in the English language of worthiness or respect, worship may sometimes refer to actions directed at members of higher social classes (such as lords or monarchs) or to particularly esteemed persons (such as a lover). Typical acts of worship include: prayer; sacrifice (korban in Hebrew); rituals; meditation; holidays, festivals; pilgrimages; hymns or psalms; the construction of temples or shrines; the creation of idols of the deity.

== Y ==
- Yana (Buddhism): A Sanskrit word with a range of meanings including nouns such as vehicle, journey, and path; and verbs such as going, moving, riding, and marching. In the Indian religions Buddhism and Hinduism, both yana and marga (road or path) express the metaphor of spiritual practice as a path or journey. Ancient texts in both religions discuss doctrines and practices associated with various yanas. In Buddhism, yana often augments the metaphor of the spiritual path with the idea of various vehicles that convey a person along that path. The yana/marga metaphor is similar to the Chinese image of the Tao (path or way) but Indian and Chinese cultures appear to have evolved such similar metaphors independently.
- Yin and yang: The concept of yin and yang (Korean: 음양; MR: ŭmyang; simplified Chinese: 阴阳; traditional Chinese: 陰陽; pinyin: yīnyáng; Vietnamese: Âm-Dương) originates in ancient Chinese philosophy and metaphysics, which describes two primal opposing but complementary forces found in all things in the universe. Yin, the darker element, is passive, dark, feminine, downward-seeking, and corresponds to the night; yang, the brighter element, is active, light, masculine, upward-seeking and corresponds to the day.
- Yoga: (Sanskrit योग, "union") A family of spiritual practices that originated in India, where it is seen primarily as a means to liberation (or moksha). Traditionally, Karma yoga, Bhakti yoga, Jnana yoga, and Rāja yoga are considered the four main yogas. In the West, yoga has become associated with the asanas (postures) of Hatha yoga, which are popular as fitness exercises. Yoga is central to Hinduism, Buddhism, and Jainism.

== Z ==
- Zazen: In Zen Buddhism, sitting meditation or zazen (Japanese: 座禅; literally "seated concentration") is a meditative discipline practitioners perform to calm the body and the mind and experience insight into the nature of existence. While the term originally referred to a sitting practice, it is now commonly used to refer to practices in any posture, such as walking.

== See also ==
- Glossary of Buddhism
- Glossary of the Catholic Church
- Glossary of ancient Roman religion
- Glossary of Christianity
- Glossary of Hinduism terms
- Glossary of Islam
- Glossary of Shinto
