= Gatha (Sikhism) =

Sikh prayer

- by Guru Arjan
- Original title: Gatha
- Written: 17th century
- Language: Gatha
- Subject: Spirituality
- Genre: Religion
- Meter: Salok
- Lines: 24
- Preceded by: ਸਲੋਕ ਸਹਸਕ੍ਰਿਤੀ (Salok Sahaskriti)
- Followed by: ਫੁਨਹੇ (Funhe)

Gatha (Punjabi: ਗਾਥਾ) is a bani by the fifth Sikh Guru, Guru Arjan Dev. It appears on ang 1360-1361 of Guru Granth Sahib - the holy scripture and living Guru of Sikhs. Gatha is made of 24 saloks. The main theme of Gatha is the praise of Waheguru and the importance of devotion to Waheguru. Gatha is a Sanskrit word translating to song or verse and refers to any composition out of the Veda. It also means katha (commentary). It is also the name of the language the composition is written in.

== Language ==
Gatha is written in a language baring the same name. Gatha, the language, uses words from Sanskrit, Pali, Prakrit, and other local languages. Gatha, the language, was rejected by Brahmins and considered inferior to Sanskrit. Guru Arjan describe the language as hard and states that only those with rare caliber can understand it. Another name for this language is Sahaskriti. The language is now considered dead.

== Contents ==
Gatha's first 8 saloks assert that a human life is only fruitful when a human does simran and sits in Saadh Sangat (holy congression). It also asserts that a human is safe from all viruses and pain through simran. The 9-24 saloks state that simran can be achieved only through Saadh Sangat and by staying in the Saadh Sangat faith is created in Waheguru and no virus can effect them. It also asserts that through the Saadh Sangat a human reaches such a level that those around them follow them and merge with Waheguru. The main theme of the composition is that a humans life is only worthwhile when they do simran of Waheguru and this is achieved in the Saadh Sangat.
