= Self-realization (disambiguation) =

Self-realization is a self-awakening.

Self-realization may also refer to:

- Self-Realization Fellowship, worldwide spiritual organization founded by Paramahansa Yogananda
- Atman jnana, the Hindu concept of self-knowledge as the self realizing it is identical with Brahman
- God-realization (Meher Baba), a state of self-realization described by Meher Baba
- Moksha, liberation from samsara in Hinduism
- Psychosynthesis, an original approach to psychology that was developed by Roberto Assagioli

== See also ==
- Self-actualization
- Enlightenment in Buddhism
- Mysticism
- Nondualism
- Simran
