= Spirituality =

Philosophical and theological term

The meaning of spirituality has developed and expanded over time, and various meanings can be found alongside each other. (Note: See: * Koenig et al.: "There is no widely agreed on definition of spirituality today". * Cobb et al.: "The spiritual dimension is deeply subjective and there is no authoritative definition of spirituality".) Traditionally, spirituality referred to a religious process of re-formation which "aims to recover the original shape of man", (Note: Waaijman uses the word "omvorming", "to change the form". Different translations are possible: transformation, re-formation, trans-mutation.) oriented at "the image of God" as exemplified by the founders and sacred texts of the religions of the world. The term was used within early Christianity to refer to a life oriented toward the Holy Spirit and broadened during the Late Middle Ages to include mental aspects of life.

In modern times, the term has spread to other religious traditions. It broadened to refer to a wider range of experiences, including a range of esoteric and religious traditions. Modern usages tend to denote a subjective experience of a sacred dimension, and the "deepest values and meanings by which people live", often in a context separate from organized religious institutions. This may involve belief in a supernatural realm beyond the ordinarily observable world, personal growth, a quest for an ultimate or sacred meaning, religious experience, or an encounter with one's own "inner dimension" or spirit.

== Etymology ==
The term spirit means "animating or vital principle in man and animals". It is derived from the Old French espirit, which comes from the Latin word spiritus (soul, ghost, courage, vigor, breath) and is related to spirare (to breathe). In the Vulgate, the Latin word spiritus is used to translate the Greek pneuma and Hebrew ruach.

The term "spiritual", meaning "concerning the spirit", is derived from Old French spirituel (12c.), which is derived from Latin spiritualis, which comes by spiritus or "spirit".

The term "spirituality" is derived from Middle French spiritualité, from Late Latin spiritualitatem (nominative spiritualitas), which is also derived from Latin spiritualis.

== Definition ==
There is no single, widely agreed-upon definition of spirituality. Surveys of the definition of the term, as used in scholarly research, show a broad range of definitions with limited overlap. A survey of reviews by McCarroll, each dealing with the topic of spirituality, gave twenty-seven explicit definitions among which "there was little agreement". This causes some difficulty in trying to study spirituality systematically; i.e., it impedes both understanding and the capacity to communicate findings in a meaningful fashion.

According to Kees Waaijman, the traditional meaning of spirituality is a process of re-formation that "aims to recover the original shape of man, the image of God. To accomplish this, the re-formation is oriented at a mold, which represents the original shape: in Judaism the Torah, in Christianity there is Christ, for Buddhism, Buddha, and in Islam, Prophet Muhammad." Houtman and Aupers suggest that modern spirituality is a blend of humanistic psychology, mystical and esoteric traditions, and Eastern religions.

In modern times the emphasis is on subjective experience and the "deepest values and meanings by which people live", incorporating personal growth or soul transformation, usually in a context separate from organized religious institutions. Spirituality can be defined generally as an individual's search for ultimate or sacred meaning, and purpose in life. Additionally it can mean to seek out or search for personal growth, religious experience, belief in a supernatural realm or afterlife, or to make sense of one's own "inner dimension".

== Development of the meaning of spirituality ==
=== Classical, medieval, and early modern periods ===
Bergomi detects "an enlightened form of non-religious spirituality" in late antiquity.

In ancient Rome, the concept of spirituality consisted mainly of the pax deorum (the peace of the gods); this was achieved through rituals and festivals that ensured divine favour and cosmic order. While Roman spirituality was communal, it also involved personal engagement with the divine through the study of mythology and philosophy. Myths served as allegories for moral lessons and models for personal conduct, guiding individuals in their relationship with the gods. The influence of Pythagorean philosophy, especially the Golden Verses, encouraged introspection, self-discipline, and ethical living. This blend of myth, philosophy, and ritual shaped a spirituality focused on both societal harmony and personal connection with the divine.

Words translatable as "spirituality" first began to arise in the 5th century and only entered common use toward the end of the Middle Ages. In a Biblical context the term means being animated by God. The New Testament offers the concept of being driven by the Holy Spirit, as opposed to living a life in which one rejects this influence.

In the 11th century, this meaning of "Spirituality" changed. Instead, the word began to denote the mental aspect of life, as opposed to the material and sensual aspects of life, "the ecclesiastical sphere of light against the dark world of matter". (Note: In Dutch: "de hemelse lichtsfeer tegenover de duistere wereld van de materie".) In the 13th century "spirituality" acquired a social and psychological meaning. Socially it denoted the territory of the clergy: "the ecclesiastical against the temporary possessions, the ecclesiastical against the secular authority, the clerical class against the secular class". (Note: In Dutch: "de kerkelijke tegenover de tijdelijke goederen, het kerkelijk tegenover het wereldlijk gezag, de geestelijke stand tegenover de lekenstand".) Psychologically, it denoted the realm of the inner life: "the purity of motives, affections, intentions, inner dispositions, the psychology of the spiritual life, the analysis of the feelings". (Note: In Dutch: "Zuiverheid van motieven, affecties, wilsintenties, innerlijke disposities, de psychologie van het geestelijk leven, de analyse van de gevoelens".)

In the 17th and 18th centuries, a distinction was made between higher and lower forms of spirituality: "A spiritual man is one who is Christian 'more abundantly and deeper than others'." (Note: In Dutch: "Een spiritueel mens is iemand die 'overvloediger en dieper dan de anderen' christen is".) The word was also associated with mysticism and quietism, and acquired a negative meaning.

=== Modern spirituality ===
Modern notions of spirituality developed throughout the 19th and 20th centuries, mixing Christian ideas with Western esoteric traditions and elements of Asian, especially Indian, religions. Spirituality became increasingly disconnected from traditional religious organizations and institutions. It is sometimes associated today with philosophical, social, or political movements such as liberalism, feminist theology, and green politics.

==== Modern Roman religion ====
In modern Roman neopagan spirituality, initiation is a central element that facilitates deeper spiritual development and access to sacred knowledge. It is viewed as a transformative process, guiding the initiate through stages of spiritual growth. Initiation introduces the individual to the esoteric meanings of Roman myths, deities, and the concept of pax deorum (peace of the gods), aligning the individual with cosmic order. This process not only prepares the initiate for participation in rituals but also emphasizes personal alignment with the divine will. As such, initiation is both a rite of passage and a means to engage meaningfully with divine forces, ensuring the individual's spiritual preparedness to uphold the traditions of Roman religious practice.

==== Transcendentalism and Unitarian Universalism ====
Ralph Waldo Emerson (1803–1882) was a pioneer of the idea of spirituality as a distinct field. He was one of the major figures in Transcendentalism, an early 19th-century liberal Protestant movement, which was rooted in English and German Romanticism, the Biblical criticism of Johann Gottfried Herder and Friedrich Schleiermacher, the skepticism of Hume, and Neoplatonism. The Transcendentalists emphasized an intuitive, experiential approach to religion. Following Schleiermacher, an individual's intuition of truth was taken as the criterion for truth. In the late 18th and early 19th century, the first translations of Hindu texts appeared, which were also read by the Transcendentalists, and influenced their thinking. They also endorsed universalist and Unitarianist ideas, leading to Unitarian Universalism, the idea that there must be truth in other religions as well since a loving God would redeem all living beings, not just Christians.

==== Theosophy, anthroposophy, and the perennial philosophy ====
A major influence on modern spirituality was the Theosophical Society, which searched for 'secret teachings' in Asian religions. It has been influential on modernist streams in several Asian religions, notably Neo-Vedanta, the revival of Theravada Buddhism, and Buddhist modernism, which have taken over modern western notions of personal experience and universalism and integrated them in their religious concepts. A second, related influence was Anthroposophy, whose founder, Rudolf Steiner, was particularly interested in developing a genuine Western spirituality, and in the ways that such a spirituality could transform practical institutions such as education, agriculture, and medicine. More independently, the spiritual science of Martinus was an influence, especially in Scandinavia.

The influence of Asian traditions on Western modern spirituality was also furthered by the perennial philosophy, whose main proponent Aldous Huxley was deeply influenced by Swami Vivekananda's Neo-Vedanta and universalism, and the spread of social welfare, education and mass travel after World War II.

==== Neo-Vedanta ====
An important influence on western spirituality was Neo-Vedanta, also called neo-Hinduism and Hindu Universalism, a modern interpretation of Hinduism which developed in response to western colonialism and orientalism. It aims to present Hinduism as a "homogenized ideal of Hinduism" with Advaita Vedanta as its central doctrine. Since the 19th century, the colonisation of Asia by the western world facilitated an exchange of ideas between Asia and the West, influencing western religiosity. Unitarianism, and the idea of Universalism, were brought to India by missionaries, and had a major influence on neo-Hinduism via Ram Mohan Roy's Brahmo Samaj and Brahmoism. Roy attempted to modernise and reform Hinduism from the idea of Universalism. This universalism was further popularised, and brought back to the West as Neo-Vedanta by Swami Vivekananda.

==== Carl Jung ====
Carl Jung placed a strong emphasis on the occult and spirituality. In his 1928 work "The Spiritual Problem of Modern Man", Jung wrote, "[T]he various forms of religion no longer appear to come from within, from the psyche; they seem more like items from the inventory of the outside world." Jung believed that something was missing in modern man, a sense of the mystical or the spiritual.

For Jung, the path to addressing this problem was the process of individuation, a lifelong journey of integrating the conscious and unconscious parts of the psyche to become a whole, unique self.

==== "Spiritual but not religious" ====
After the Second World War, spirituality and theistic religion became increasingly disconnected, and spirituality became more oriented on subjective experience, instead of "attempts to place the self within a broader ontological context". A new discourse developed, in which (humanistic) psychology, mystical and esoteric traditions and eastern religions are being blended, to reach the true self by self-disclosure, free expression, and meditation.

The distinction between the spiritual and the religious became more common in the popular mind during the late 20th century with the rise of secularism and the advent of the New Age movement. Authors such as Chris Griscom and Shirley MacLaine explored it in numerous ways in their books. Paul Heelas noted the development within New Age circles of what he called "seminar spirituality": structured offerings complementing consumer choice with spiritual options.

Among other factors, declining membership of organized religions and the growth of secularism in the western world have given rise to this broader view of spirituality. The term "spiritual" is now frequently used in contexts in which the term "religious" was formerly employed. Both theists and atheists have criticized this development.

== Traditional spirituality ==
=== Abrahamic faiths ===
==== Judaism ====
Spirituality in Judaism (Hebrew: רוחניות, romanized: ruhniyut) may involve practices of Jewish ethics, Jewish prayer, Jewish meditation, Shabbat and holiday observance, Torah study, dietary laws, teshuvah, and other practices. It may involve practices ordained by halakhah or other practices. Common to all of these experiences is that they are done communally.

Kabbalah (literally "receiving") is an esoteric method, discipline and school of thought of Judaism. Kabbalah is a set of esoteric teachings meant to explain the relationship between an unchanging, eternal and mysterious Ein Sof (no end) and the mortal and finite universe (his creation). Interpretations of Kabbalistic spirituality are found within Hasidic Judaism, a branch of Orthodox Judaism founded in 18th-century Eastern Europe by Rabbi Israel Baal Shem Tov. Hasidism often emphasizes the Immanent Divine presence and focuses on emotion, fervour, and the figure of the Tzadik. This movement included an elite ideal of nullification to paradoxical Divine Panentheism.

The Musar movement is a Jewish spiritual movement that has focused on developing character traits such as faith, humility, and love. The Musar movement, first founded in the 19th century by Israel Salanter and developed in the 21st century by Alan Morinis and Ira F. Stone, has encouraged spiritual practices of Jewish meditation, Jewish prayer, Jewish ethics, tzedakah, teshuvah, and the study of musar (ethical) literature.

Reform Judaism and Conservative Judaism have often emphasized the spirituality of Jewish ethics and tikkun olam, feminist spirituality, Jewish prayer, Torah study, ritual, and musar.

==== Christianity ====
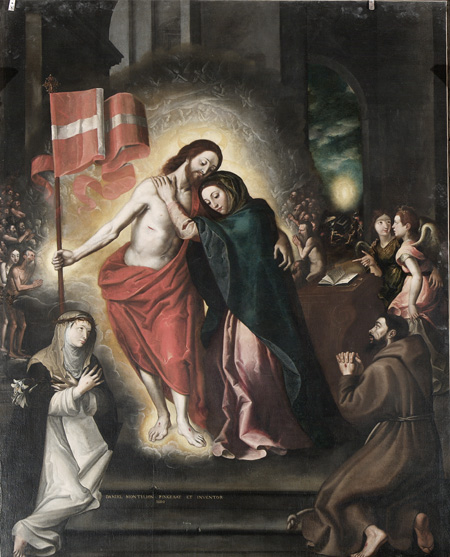
Union with Christ is the purpose of Christian mysticism.

Christian spirituality is the spiritual practice of living out a personal faith. Pope Francis offered several ways in which the calling of Christian spirituality can be considered:

- "Christian spirituality proposes an alternative understanding of the quality of life, and encourages a prophetic and contemplative lifestyle, one capable of deep enjoyment free of the obsession with consumption";
- "Christian spirituality proposes a growth marked by moderation and the capacity to be happy with little."
- Work, with an understanding of its meaning, and relaxation are both important dimensions of Christian spirituality.

The terminology of the Catholic Church refers to an act of faith (fides qua creditur) following the acceptance of faith (fides quae creditur). Although all Catholics are expected to pray together at Mass, there are many different forms of spirituality and private prayer that have developed over the centuries. Each of the major religious orders of the Catholic Church and other lay groupings have their own unique spirituality – its own way of approaching God in prayer and in living out the Gospel.

Christian mysticism refers to the development of mystical practices and theory within Christianity. It has often been connected to mystical theology, especially in the Catholic and Eastern Orthodox traditions. The attributes and means by which Christian mysticism is studied and practiced are varied and range from ecstatic visions of the soul's mystical union with God to simple prayerful contemplation of Holy Scripture (i.e., Lectio Divina).

Progressive Christianity is a contemporary movement which seeks to remove the supernatural claims of the faith and replace them with a post-critical understanding of biblical spirituality based on historical and scientific research. It focuses on the lived experience of spirituality over historical dogmatic claims, and accepts that the faith is both true and a human construction, and that spiritual experiences are psychologically and neurally real and useful.

==== Islam ====
An inner spiritual struggle and an outer physical struggle are two commonly accepted meanings of the Arabic word jihad. The "greater jihad" is the inner struggle by a believer to fulfill their religious duties and fight against one's ego. This non-violent meaning is stressed by both Muslim and non-Muslim authors.

Al-Khatib al-Baghdadi, an 11th-century Islamic scholar, referenced a statement by the companion of Muhammad, Jabir ibn Abd-Allah:

The Prophet ... returned from one of his battles, and thereupon told us, 'You have arrived with an excellent arrival, you have come from the Lesser Jihad to the Greater Jihad – the striving of a servant (of Allah) against his desires (holy war)." (Note: This reference gave rise to the distinguishing of two forms of jihad: "greater" and "lesser". Some Islamic scholars dispute the authenticity of this reference and consider the meaning of jihad as a holy war to be more important.)

===== Sufism =====
The best known form of Islamic mystic spirituality is the Sufi tradition (famous through Rumi and Hafiz) in which a Sheikh or pir transmits spiritual discipline to students.

Sufism or taṣawwuf (Arabic: تصوّف) is defined by its adherents as the inner, mystical dimension of Islam. A practitioner of this tradition is generally known as a ṣūfī (صُوفِيّ). Sufis believe they are practicing ihsan (perfection of worship) as revealed by Gabriel to Muhammad,

Worship and serve Allah as you are seeing Him and while you see Him not yet truly He sees you.

Sufis consider themselves as the original true proponents of this pure original form of Islam. They are strong adherents to the principal of tolerance, peace and against any form of violence. The Sufi have suffered severe persecution by more rigid and fundamentalist groups such as the Wahhabi and Salafi movement. In 1843 the Senussi Sufi were forced to flee Mecca and Medina and head to Sudan and Libya.

Classical Sufi scholars have defined Sufism as "a science whose objective is the reparation of the heart and turning it away from all else but God". Alternatively, in the words of the Darqawi Sufi teacher Ahmad ibn Ajiba, "a science through which one can know how to travel into the presence of the Divine, purify one's inner self from filth, and beautify it with a variety of praiseworthy traits".

=== Indian religions ===
==== Jainism ====
Jainism, traditionally known as Jain Dharma, is an ancient Indian religion. The three main pillars of Jainism are ahiṃsā (non-violence), anekāntavāda (non-absolutism), and aparigraha (non-attachment). Jains take five main vows: ahiṃsā (non-violence), satya (truth), asteya (not stealing), brahmacharya (sexual continence), and aparigraha (non-possessiveness). These principles have affected Jain culture in many ways, such as leading to a predominantly vegetarian lifestyle. Parasparopagraho jīvānām (the function of souls is to help one another) is the faith's motto and the Ṇamōkāra mantra is its most common and basic prayer.

Jainism traces its spiritual ideas and history through a succession of twenty-four leaders or Tirthankaras, with the first in the current time cycle being Rishabhadeva, whom the tradition holds to have lived millions of years ago; the twenty-third tirthankara Parshvanatha, whom historians date to 9th century BCE; and the twenty-fourth tirthankara, Mahavira around 600 BCE. Jainism is considered to be an eternal dharma with the tirthankaras guiding every time cycle of the cosmology.

==== Buddhism ====
Buddhist practices are known as Bhavana, which literally means "development" or "cultivating" or "producing" in the sense of "calling into existence". It is an important concept in Buddhist praxis (Patipatti). The word bhavana normally appears in conjunction with another word forming a compound phrase such as citta-bhavana (the development or cultivation of the heart/mind) or metta-bhavana (the development/cultivation of loving kindness). When used on its own bhavana signifies 'spiritual cultivation' generally.

Various Buddhist paths to liberation developed throughout the ages. Best-known is the Noble Eightfold Path, but others include the Bodhisattva Path and Lamrim.

==== Hinduism ====
Hinduism has no traditional ecclesiastical order, no centralized religious authorities, no governing body, no prophets nor any binding holy book; Hindus can choose to be polytheistic, henotheistic, pantheistic, monotheistic, or atheistic. Within this diffuse and open structure, spirituality in Hindu philosophy is an individual experience, and referred to as ksaitrajña (Sanskrit: क्षैत्रज्ञ) seeking peace, spiritual growth, self-discovery, and soul transformation through knowledge, prayer, meditation, and mantra chanting for deep mindfulness. It defines spiritual practice as one's journey towards moksha, awareness of self, the discovery of higher truths, Ultimate reality, and a consciousness that is liberated and content.

===== Four paths =====
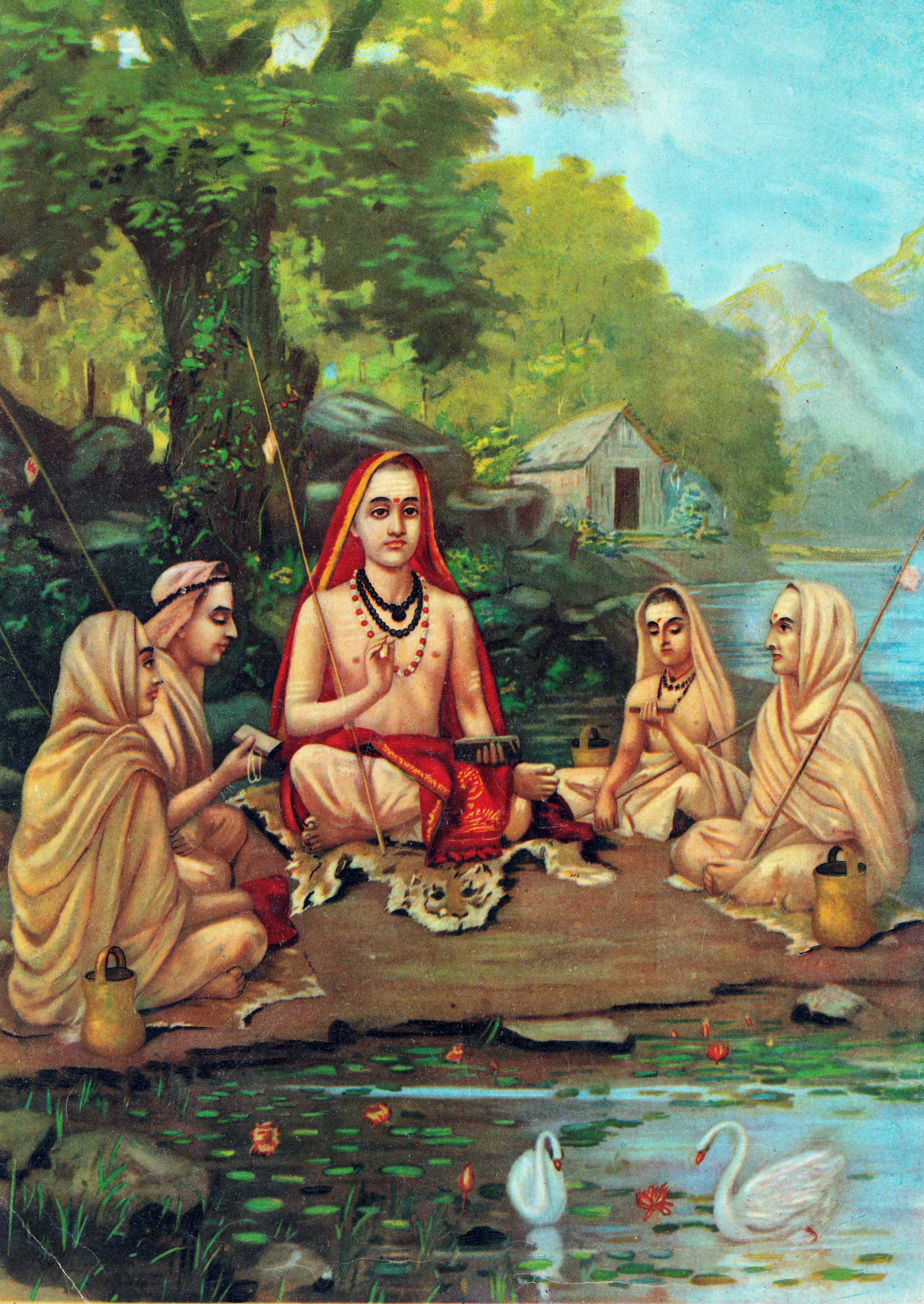
Jñāna marga

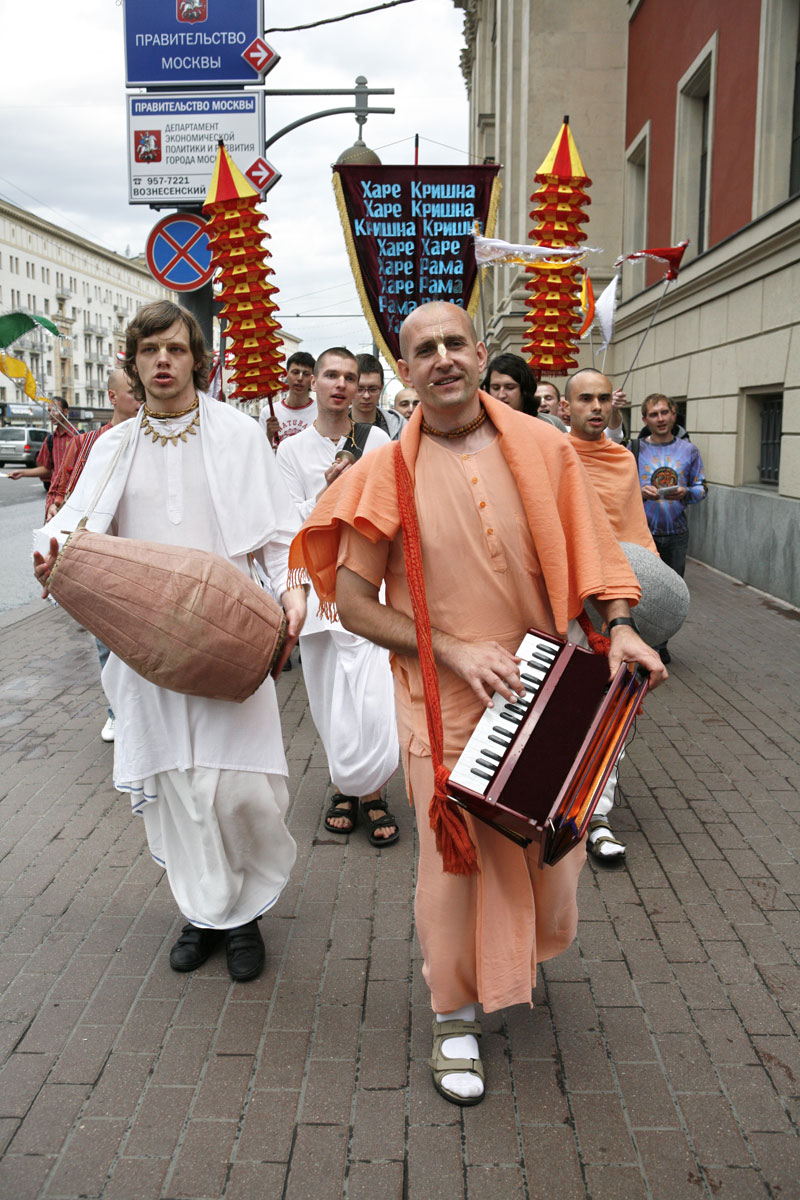
Bhakti marga

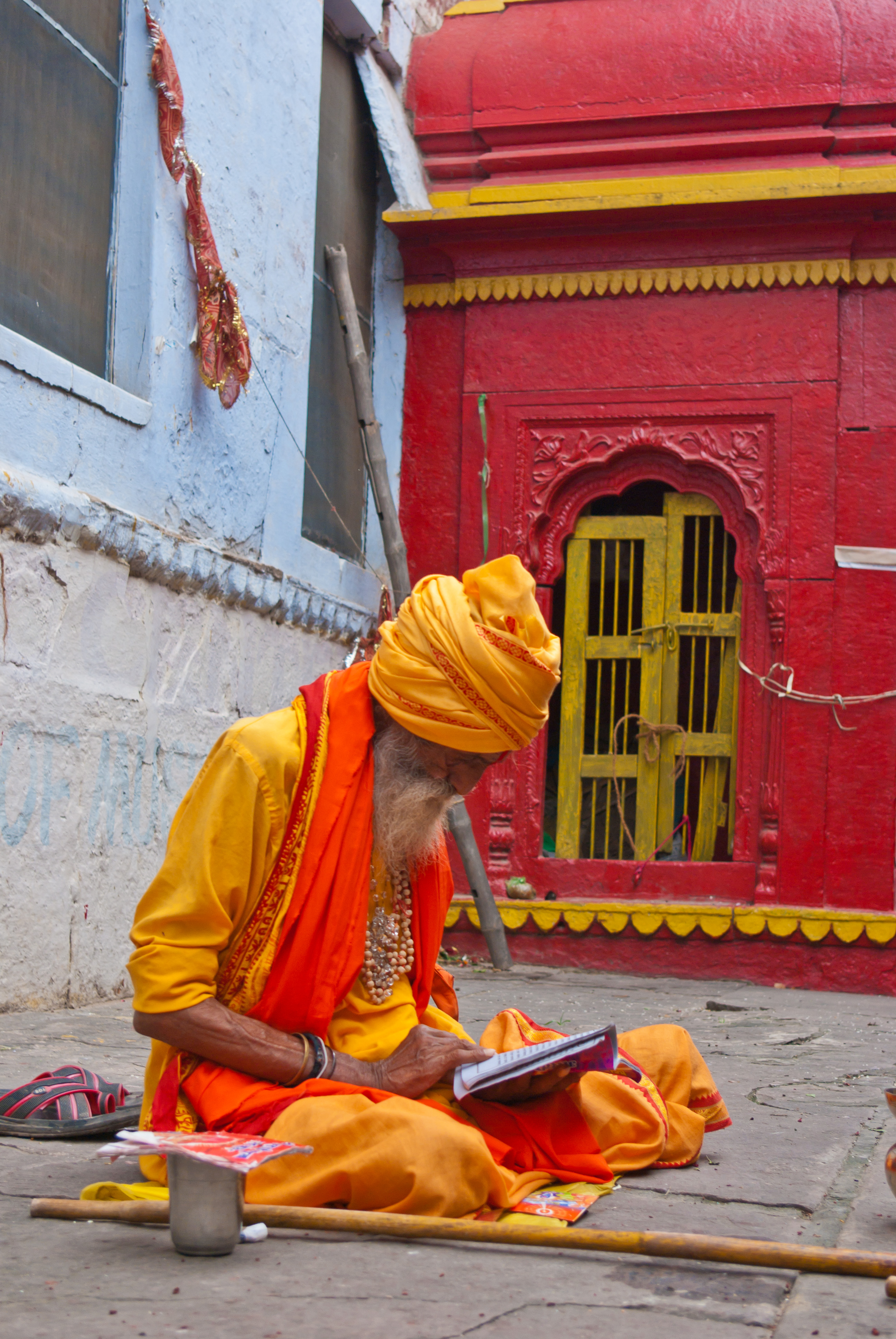
Rāja marga

Three of four paths of spirituality in Hinduism

Traditionally, Hinduism identifies three mārga (ways) (Note: See also Bhagavad Gita (The Celestial Song), Chapters 2:56–57, 12, 13:1–28) of spiritual practice, namely Jñāna (ज्ञान), the way of knowledge; Bhakti, the way of devotion; and Karma yoga, the way of selfless action. In the 19th century Vivekananda, in his neo-Vedanta synthesis of Hinduism, added Rāja yoga, the way of contemplation and meditation, as a fourth way, calling all of them "yoga". (Note: Georg Feuerstein: "Yoga is not easy to define. In most general terms, the Sanskrit word yoga stands for spiritual discipline in Hinduism, Jainism, and certain schools of Buddhism. (...). Yoga is the equivalent of Christian mysticism, Moslem Sufism, or the Jewish Kabbalah. A spiritual practitioner is known as a yogin (if male) or a yogini (if female).")

Jñāna marga is a path often assisted by a guru (teacher) in one's spiritual practice. Bhakti marga is a path of faith and devotion to deity or deities; the spiritual practice often includes chanting, singing and music – such as in kirtans – in front of idols, or images of one or more deity, or a devotional symbol of the holy. Karma marga is the path of one's work, where diligent practical work or vartta (Sanskrit: वार्त्ता, profession) becomes in itself a spiritual practice, and work in daily life is perfected as a form of spiritual liberation and not for its material rewards. (Note: Klaus Klostermaier discusses examples from Bhagavata Purana, another ancient Hindu scripture, where a forest worker discovers observing mother nature is a spiritual practice, to wisdom and liberating knowledge. The Purana suggests that "true knowledge of nature" leads to "true knowledge of Self and God." It illustrates 24 gurus that nature provides. For example, earth teaches steadfastness and the wisdom that all things while pursuing their own activities, do nothing but follow the divine laws that are universally established; another wisdom from earth is her example of accepting the good and bad from everyone. Another guru, the honeybee teaches that one must make effort to gain knowledge, a willingness and flexibility to examine, pick and collect essence from different scriptures and sources. And so on. Nature is a mirror image of spirit, perceptive awareness of nature can be spirituality.) Rāja marga is the path of cultivating necessary virtues, self-discipline, tapas (meditation), contemplation and self-reflection sometimes with isolation and renunciation of the world, to a pinnacle state called samādhi. This state of samādhi has been compared to peak experience.

There is a rigorous debate in Indian literature on relative merits of these theoretical spiritual practices. For example, Chandogyopanishad suggests that those who engage in ritualistic offerings to gods and priests will fail in their spiritual practice, while those who engage in tapas will succeed; Shvetashvatara Upanishad suggests that a successful spiritual practice requires a longing for truth, but warns of becoming 'false ascetic' who go through the mechanics of spiritual practice without meditating on the nature of Self and universal Truths. In the practice of Hinduism, suggest modern era scholars such as Vivekananda, the choice between the paths is up to the individual and a person's proclivities. Other scholars suggest that these Hindu spiritual practices are not mutually exclusive, but overlapping. These four paths of spirituality are also known in Hinduism outside India, such as in Balinese Hinduism, where it is called Chatur Marga (literally: four paths).

===== Schools and spirituality =====
Different schools of Hinduism encourage different spiritual practices. In Tantric school for example, the spiritual practice has been referred to as sādhanā. It involves initiation into the school, undergoing rituals, and achieving moksha liberation by experiencing union of cosmic polarities. The Hare Krishna school emphasizes bhakti yoga as spiritual practice. In Advaita Vedanta school, the spiritual practice emphasizes jñāna yoga in stages: samnyasa (cultivate virtues), sravana (hear, study), manana (reflect) and dhyana (nididhyasana, contemplate).

==== Sikhism ====
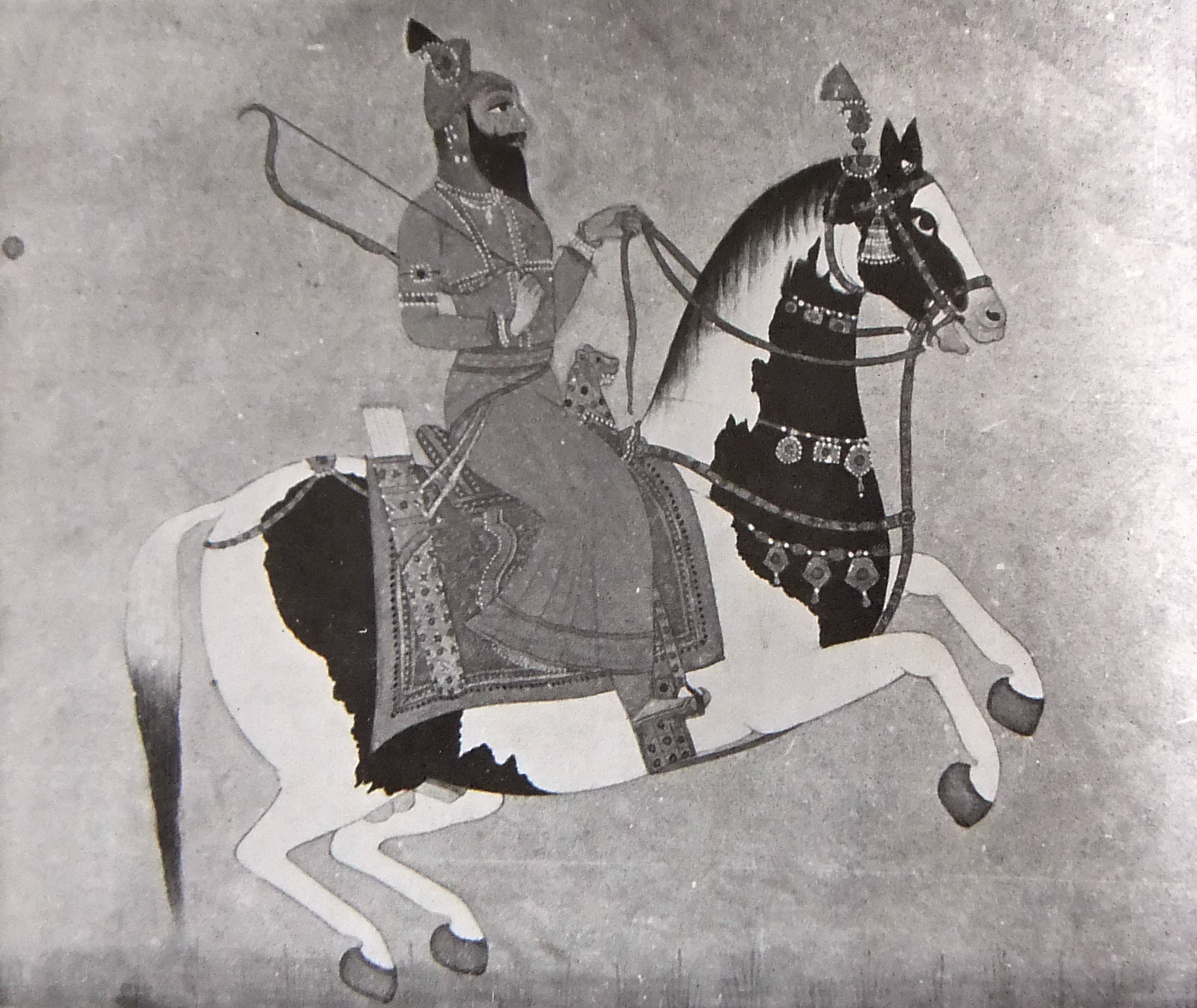
An 18th century Sikh Raja

Sikhism considers spiritual life and secular life to be intertwined: "In the Sikh Weltanschauung ... the temporal world is part of the Infinite Reality and partakes of its characteristics." Guru Nanak described living an "active, creative, and practical life" of "truthfulness, fidelity, self-control and purity" as being higher than a purely contemplative life.

The 6th Sikh Guru Guru Hargobind re-affirmed that the political/temporal (Miri) and spiritual (Piri) realms are mutually coexistent. According to the 9th Sikh Guru, Tegh Bahadhur, the ideal Sikh should have both Shakti (power that resides in the temporal), and Bhakti (spiritual meditative qualities). This was developed into the concept of the Saint Soldier by the 10th Sikh Guru, Gobind Singh.

According to Guru Nanak, the goal is to attain the "attendant balance of separation-fusion, self-other, action-inaction, attachment-detachment, in the course of daily life", the polar opposite to a self-centered existence. Nanak talks further about the one God or akal (timelessness) that permeates all life). and which must be seen with 'the inward eye', or the 'heart', of a human being.

In Sikhism there is no dogma, priests, monastics or yogis.

=== African spirituality ===
In some African contexts, spirituality is considered a belief system that guides the welfare of society and the people therein, and eradicates sources of unhappiness occasioned by evil. In traditional society prior to colonization and extensive introduction to Christianity or Islam, religion was the strongest element in society influencing the thinking and actions of the people. Hence spirituality was a sub-domain of religion. Despite the rapid social, economic and political changes of the last century, traditional religion remains the essential background for many African people. And that religion is a communal given, not an individual choice. Religion gives all of life its meaning and provides ground for action. Each person is "a living creed of his religion". There is no concern for spiritual matters apart from ones physical and communal life. Life continues after death but remains focused on pragmatic family and community matters.

== Contemporary spirituality ==
The term spiritual has frequently become used in contexts in which the term religious was formerly employed. Contemporary spirituality is also called "post-traditional spirituality" and "New Age spirituality". Hanegraaf makes a distinction between two "New Age" movements: New Age in a restricted sense, which originated primarily in mid-twentieth century England and had its roots in Theosophy and Anthroposophy, and "New Age" in a general sense, which emerged in the later 1970s:

when increasing numbers of people ... began to perceive a broad similarity between a wide variety of "alternative ideas" and pursuits, and started to think of them as part of one "movement".

Those who speak of spirituality outside of religion often define themselves as spiritual but not religious, and generally believe in the existence of different "spiritual paths", emphasizing the importance of finding one's own individual path to spirituality. According to one 2005 poll, about 24% of the United States population identifies itself as "spiritual but not religious".

Lockwood draws attention to the variety of spiritual experience in the contemporary West:

The new Western spiritual landscape, characterised by consumerism and choice abundance, is scattered with novel religious manifestations based in psychology and the Human Potential Movement, each offering participants a pathway to the Self.

Those who speak of spirituality within religion also recognise the need for spirituality to take on a contemporary form: thus, for example, Pope Francis referred to and reflected on "contemporary devotion" in his encyclical letter Dilexit nos issued in 2024.

=== Characteristics ===
Modern spirituality centers on the "deepest values and meanings by which people live". It often embraces the idea of an ultimate or an alleged immaterial reality. It envisions an inner path enabling a person to discover the essence of his or her being.

Not all modern notions of spirituality embrace transcendental ideas. Secular spirituality emphasizes humanistic ideas on moral character (qualities such as love, compassion, patience, tolerance, forgiveness, contentment, responsibility, harmony, and a concern for others). These are aspects of life and human experience which go beyond a purely materialist view of the world without necessarily accepting belief in a supernatural reality or any divine being. Nevertheless, many humanists (e.g. Bertrand Russell, Jean-Paul Sartre) who clearly value the non-material, communal, and virtuous aspects of life reject this usage of the term "spirituality" as being overly-broad (i.e. it effectively amounts to saying "everything and anything that is good and virtuous is necessarily spiritual"). In 1930 Russell, a self-described agnostic renowned as an atheist, wrote "... one's ego is no very large part of the world. The man who can centre his thoughts and hopes upon something transcending self can find a certain peace in the ordinary troubles of life which is impossible to the pure egoist." Similarly, Aristotle – one of the first known Western thinkers to demonstrate that morality, virtue and goodness can be derived without appealing to supernatural forces – argued that "men create Gods in their own image" (not the other way around). Moreover, theistic and atheistic critics alike dismiss the need for the "secular spirituality" label on the basis that it appears to be nothing more than obscurantism in that:

- the term "spirit" is commonly taken as denoting the existence of unseen / otherworldly / life-giving forces; and
- words such as "morality", "philanthropy" and "humanism" already efficiently and succinctly describe the prosocial-orientation and civility that the phrase "secular spirituality" is meant to convey but without risking confusion that one is referring to something supernatural.

Jewish-French philosopher Emmanuel Levinas criticized forms of spirituality centered on ecstatic union with the divine, arguing that they could subordinate moral responsibility toward other people to an experience of religious transcendence. Levinas instead emphasized an "atheistic" stance in which the self maintains a distinction from the divine while encountering God through responsibility toward the other.

Contemporary proponents of spirituality may suggest that spirituality develops inner peace and forms a foundation for happiness. For example, meditation and similar practices are suggested to help the practitioner cultivate a personal inner life and character. Ellison and Fan (2008) assert that spirituality causes a wide array of positive health outcomes, including "morale, happiness, and life satisfaction". However, Schuurmans-Stekhoven (2013) actively attempted to replicate this research and found more "mixed" results. Nevertheless, spirituality has played a central role in some self-help movements such as Alcoholics Anonymous:

if an alcoholic failed to perfect and enlarge his spiritual life through work and self-sacrifice for others, he could not survive the certain trials and low spots ahead

Such spiritually-informed treatment approaches have been challenged as pseudoscience.

=== Spiritual experience ===
Spiritual experiences play a central role in modern spirituality. Both western and Asian authors have popularised this notion. Important early-20th century Western writers who studied the phenomenon of spirituality, and their works, include William James, The Varieties of Religious Experience (1902) and Rudolph Otto, especially The Idea of the Holy (1917)

James' notions of "spiritual experience" had a further influence on the modernist streams in Asian traditions, making them even further recognisable for a western audience.

William James popularized the use of the term "religious experience" in his The Varieties of Religious Experience. He has also influenced the understanding of mysticism as a distinctive experience which allegedly grants knowledge.

Wayne Proudfoot traces the roots of the notion of "religious experience" further back to the German theologian Friedrich Schleiermacher (1768–1834), who argued that religion is based on a feeling of the infinite. Schleiermacher used the idea of "religious experience" to defend religion against the growing scientific and secular critique. Many scholars of religion, of whom William James was the most influential, adopted the concept.

Major Asian influences on contemporary spirituality have included Swami Vivekananda (1863–1902) and D. T. Suzuki (1870–1966). Vivekananda popularised a modern syncretic Hinduism in which an emphasis on personal experience replaced the authority of scriptures. Suzuki had a major influence on the popularisation of Zen in the west and popularized the idea of enlightenment as insight into a timeless, transcendent reality. Other influences came through Paul Brunton's A Search in Secret India (1934), which introduced Ramana Maharshi (1879–1950) and Meher Baba (1894–1969) to a western audience.

Spiritual experiences can include being connected to a larger reality, yielding a more comprehensive self; joining with other individuals or the human community; with nature or the cosmos; or with the divine realm.

=== Spiritual practices ===
Kees Waaijman discerns four forms of spiritual practices:

1. Somatic practices, especially deprivation and diminishment. Deprivation aims to purify the body. Diminishment concerns the repulsement of ego-oriented impulses. Examples include fasting and poverty.
2. Psychological practices, for example meditation.
3. Social practices. Examples include the practice of obedience and communal ownership, reforming ego-orientedness into other-orientedness.
4. Spiritual. All practices aim at purifying ego-centeredness, and direct the abilities at the divine reality.

Spiritual practices may include meditation, mindfulness, prayer, the contemplation of sacred texts, ethical development, and spiritual retreats in a convent. Love and/or compassion are often described as the mainstay of spiritual development.

Within spirituality is also found "a common emphasis on the value of thoughtfulness, tolerance for breadth and practices and beliefs, and appreciation for the insights of other religious communities, as well as other sources of authority within the social sciences".

=== Spiritual care in health care professions ===
In the health-care professions there is growing interest in "spiritual care", to complement the medical-technical approaches and to improve the outcomes of medical treatments. Puchalski et al. argue for "compassionate systems of care" in a spiritual context.

== Scientific research ==
=== Health and well-being ===
Various studies (most originating from North America) have reported a positive correlation between measures of "spirituality" and mental well-being in both healthy people and those encountering a range of physical illnesses or psychological disorders. (Note: Nelson et al. (2002) define spirituality as "the need for finding satisfactory answers to ... ultimate questions about the meaning of life, illness and death'.") Although spiritual individuals tend to be optimistic, report greater social support, and experience higher intrinsic meaning in life, strength, and inner peace, whether the correlation represents a causal link remains contentious. Both supporters and opponents of this claim agree that past statistical findings are difficult to interpret, in large part because of the ongoing disagreement over how spirituality should be defined and measured. There is also evidence that an agreeable/positive temperament and/or a tendency toward sociability (which all correlate with spirituality) might actually be the key psychological features that predispose people to subsequently adopt a spiritual orientation and that these characteristics, not spiritually per se, add to well-being. There is also some suggestion that the benefits associated with spirituality and religiosity might arise from being a member of a close-knit community. Social bonds available via secular sources (i.e., not unique to spirituality or faith-based groups) might just as effectively raise well-being. In sum, spirituality may not be the "active ingredient" (i.e., past association with psychological well-being measures might reflect a reverse causation or effects from other variables that correlate with spirituality), and that the effects of agreeableness, conscientiousness, or virtue – personality traits common in many non-spiritual people yet known to be slightly more common among the spiritual – may better account for spirituality's apparent correlation with mental health and social support.

=== Intercessionary prayer ===
Masters and Spielmans conducted a meta-analysis of all the available and reputable research examining the effects of distant intercessory prayer. They found no discernible health effects from being prayed for by others. In fact, one large and scientifically rigorous study by Herbert Benson and colleagues revealed that intercessory prayer had no effect on recovery from cardiac arrest, but patients told people were praying for them actually had an increased risk of medical complications.

=== Spiritual experiences ===
Neuroscientists have examined brain functioning during reported spiritual experiences finding that certain neurotransmitters and specific areas of the brain are involved. Moreover, experimenters have also successfully induced spiritual experiences in individuals by administering psychoactive agents known to elicit euphoria and perceptual distortions. Conversely, religiosity and spirituality can also be dampened by electromagnetic stimulation of the brain. These results have motivated some leading theorists to speculate that spirituality may be a benign subtype of psychosis – benign in the sense that the same aberrant sensory perceptions that those suffering clinical psychoses evaluate as distressingly incongruent and inexplicable are instead interpreted by spiritual individuals as positive (personal and meaningful transcendent experiences).

=== Measurement ===
Considerable debate persists about – among other factors – spirituality's relation to religion, the number and content of its dimensions, its relation to concepts of well-being, and its universality. A number of research groups have developed instruments which attempt to measure spirituality quantitatively, including unidimensional (e.g. the Character Strength Inventory—Spirituality and the Daily Spiritual Experiences Scale) and multi-dimensional (e.g. Spiritual Transcendence Scale (STS) and the Brief Multidimensional Measure of Religiousness/Spirituality (BMMRS)) scales. MacDonald et al. gave an "Expressions of Spirituality Inventory" (ESI-R) measuring five dimensions of spirituality to over 4000 persons across eight countries. The study results and interpretation highlighted the complexity and challenges of measurement of spirituality cross-culturally.

== See also ==
- Western esotericism
- Glossary of spirituality terms
- Ietsism
- Interspirituality
- Multiple religious belonging
- Outline of spirituality
- Reason
- Relationship between religion and science
- Sacred–profane dichotomy
- Self-actualization
- Spiritual activism
- Spiritual intelligence
- Sublime (philosophy)

== Sources ==
=== Published sources ===
- Cobb, Mark R.; Puchalski, Christina M.; Rumbold, Bruce (2012). Oxford Textbook of Spirituality in Healthcare.
- Comans, Michael (January 1993). "The Question of the Importance of Samadhi in Modern and Classical Advaita Vedanta". Philosophy East and West. 43 (1): 19–38. doi:10.2307/1399467. JSTOR 1399467. Archived from the original on 2017-06-03.
- Dorff, Elliot N. (2018). Modern Conservative Judaism: Evolving Thought and Practice. University of Nebraska Press.
- Feuerstein, Georg (2003). The deeper dimension of yoga: Theory and practice. London: Shambhala. ISBN 1-57062-935-8.
- Gorsuch, R.L.; Miller, W.R. (1999). "Assessing spirituality". In W.R. Miller (ed.). Integrating spirituality into treatment. Washington, DC: American Psychological Association. pp. 47–64.
- Griffin, David Ray (1988). Spirituality and Society. SUNY.
- Hanegraaff, Wouter J. (1996). New Age Religion and Western Culture. Esotericism in the mirror of Secular Thought. Leiden/New York/Koln: Brill.
- Hori, Victor Sogen (1999). "Translating the Zen Phrase Book" (PDF). Nanzan Bulletin. 23. Archived (PDF) from the original on 2020-01-16.
- Houtman, Dick; Aupers, Stef (2007). "The Spiritual Turn and the Decline of Tradition: The Spread of Post-Christian Spirituality in 14 Western Countries, 1981–2000". Journal for the Scientific Study of Religion. 46 (3): 305–320. doi:10.1111/j.1468-5906.2007.00360.x.
- Kaplan, Dana Evan (2013). Contemporary Debates in American Reform Judaism: Conflicting Visions.
- Kaplan, Dana Evan (2018). A Life of Meaning: Embracing Reform Judaism's Sacred Path.
- King, Richard (2002). Orientalism and Religion: Post-Colonial Theory, India and "The Mystic East". Routledge.
- Koenig, H.G. (2008). "Research on religion, spirituality, and mental health: A review". Canadian Journal of Psychiatry.
- Koenig, Harold; King, Dana; Carson, Verna B. (2012). Handbook of Religion and Health. Oxford University Press.
- McCarroll, Pam; O'Connor, Thomas St. James; Meakes, Elizabeth (2005). "Assessing plurality in Spirituality Definitions". In Meier; et al. (eds.). Spirituality and Health: Multidisciplinary Explorations. Wilfrid Laurier Univ. Press. pp. 44–59.
- McMahan, David L. (2008). The Making of Buddhist Modernism. Oxford University Press. ISBN 978-0-19-518327-6.
- Morgan, Diane (2010). Essential Islam: a comprehensive guide to belief and practice. ABC-CLIO. ISBN 978-0-313-36025-1.
- Nyanatiloka, Mahathera (1980). Buddhist Dictionary: Manual of Terms And Doctrines (4th ed.). Kandy, Sri Lanka: Buddhist Publication Society.
- Otterloo, Anneke; Aupers, Stef; Houtman, Dick (2012). "Trajectories to the New Age. The spiritual turn of the first generation of Dutch New Age teachers" (PDF). Social Compass. 59 (2): 239–56. doi:10.1177/0037768612440965. hdl:1765/21876. S2CID 145189097. Archived (PDF) from the original on 2017-08-09.
- Puchalski, Christina; Vitillo, Robert; Hull, Sharon; Relle, Nancy (2014). "Spiritual Dimensions of Whole Person Care: Reaching National and International Consensus". Journal of Palliative Medicine. 17 (6): 642–656. doi:10.1089/jpm.2014.9427. PMC 4038982. PMID 24842136.
- Rambachan, Anatanand (1994). The Limits of Scripture: Vivekananda's Reinterpretation of the Vedas. University of Hawaii Press.
- Remes, Pauliina (2014). Neoplatonism. Routledge.
- Renard, Philip (2010). Non-Dualisme. De directe bevrijdingsweg. Cothen: Uitgeverij Juwelenschip.
- Roy, Sumita (2003). Aldous Huxley And Indian Thought. Sterling Publishers Pvt. Ltd.
- Saucier, Gerard; Skrzypinska, Katarzyna (1 October 2006). "Spiritual But Not Religious? Evidence for Two Independent Dispositions" (PDF). Journal of Personality. 74 (5): 1257–92. doi:10.1111/j.1467-6494.2006.00409.x. JSTOR 27734699. PMID 16958702. Archived (PDF) from the original on 2017-08-08.
- Schuurmans-Stekhoven, J.B. (2010). "'Moved by the spirit': does spirituality moderate the inter-relationships between subjective well-being subscales?". Journal of Clinical Psychology. 66 (7): 709–725. doi:10.1002/jclp.20694. PMID 20527052.
- Schuurmans-Stekhoven, J.B. (2011). "Is it God or just the data that moves in mysterious ways? How well-being research might be mistaking faith for virtue?". Social Indicators Research. 100 (2): 313–330. doi:10.1007/s11205-010-9630-7. S2CID 144755003.
- Schuurmans-Stekhoven, J.B. (2013). "As a shepherd divideth his sheep from the goats": Does the Daily Spiritual Experiences Scale encapsulate separable theistic and civility components?". Social Indicators Research. 110 (1): 131–146. doi:10.1007/s11205-011-9920-8. S2CID 144658300.
- Schuurmans-Stekhoven, J.B. (2013a). "Is God's call more than audible? A preliminary exploration of a two-dimensional model of theistic/spiritual beliefs and experiences". Australian Journal of Psychology. 65 (3): 146–155. doi:10.1111/ajpy.12015. S2CID 143149239.
- Schuurmans-Stekhoven, J.B. (2014). "Measuring Spirituality as Personal Belief in Supernatural Forces: Is the Character Strength Inventory-Spirituality subscale a brief, reliable and valid measure?". Implicit Religion. 17 (2): 211–222. doi:10.1558/imre.v17i2.211.
- Schuurmans-Stekhoven, J.B. (2017). "Spirit or Fleeting Apparition? Why Spirituality's Link with Social Support Might be Incrementally Invalid". Journal of Religion and Health. 56 (4): 1248–1262. doi:10.1007/s10943-013-9801-3. PMID 24297674. S2CID 4913532.
- Schuurmans-Stekhoven, J.B. (2019). "Conviction, character and coping: religiosity and personality are both uniquely associated with optimism and positive reappraising". Mental Health, Religion & Culture: 1–17.
- Sharf, Robert H. (1995). "Buddhist Modernism and the Rhetoric of Meditative Experience" (PDF). NUMEN. 42 (3): 228–283. doi:10.1163/1568527952598549. hdl:2027.42/43810. Archived from the original (PDF) on 2019-04-12.
- Sharf, Robert H. (2000). "The Rhetoric of Experience and the Study of Religion" (PDF). Journal of Consciousness Studies. 7 (11–12): 267–287. Archived from the original (PDF) on 2013-05-13.
- Sheldrake, Philip (2007). A Brief History of Spirituality. Wiley-Blackwell.
- Sinari, Ramakant (2000). "Advaita and Contemporary Indian Philosophy". In Chattopadhyana (ed.). History of Science, Philosophy and Culture in Indian Civilization. Vol. II. Delhi: Centre for Studies in Civilizations.
- Snyder, C.R.; Lopez, Shane J. (2007). Positive Psychology. Sage Publications, Inc. ISBN 978-0-7619-2633-7.
- Sonsino, Rifat (2002). Six Jewish Spiritual Paths: A Rationalist Looks at Spirituality.
- Versluis, Arthur (2014). American Gurus: From Transcendentalism to New Age Religion. Oxford University Press.
- Waaijman, Kees (2000). Spiritualiteit. Vormen, grondslagen, methoden. Kampen/Gent: Kok/Carmelitana.
- Waaijman, Kees (2002). Spirituality: Forms, Foundations, Methods. Peeters Publishers.
- Wong, Yuk-Lin Renita; Vinsky, Jana (2009). "Speaking from the Margins: A Critical Reflection on the 'Spiritual-but-not-Religious' Discourse in Social Work". British Journal of Social Work. 39 (7): 1343–1359. doi:10.1093/bjsw/bcn032.
- Yelle, Robert A. (December 2012). "Comparative Religion as Cultural Combat: Occidentalism and Relativism in Rajiv Malhotra's Being Different". International Journal of Hindu Studies. 16 (3): 335–348. doi:10.1007/s11407-012-9133-z. S2CID 144950049.
