= Simran =

Meditation on the words of Sikh guru Granth Sahib

Simran (Gurmukhi: ਸਿਮਰਨ, pronunciation: [sɪmɾǝn]; Hindi: सिमरण, सिमरन; from Sanskrit: स्मरण, smaraṇa, 'to remember, reminisce, recollect'), in spirituality, is a Hindi and Punjabi word referring to the continuous remembrance of the finest aspect of the self, and/or the continuous remembrance (or feeling) of God. This state is maintained continuously while carrying out the worldly works outside.

== Sant Mat ==
In Sant Mat, the word simran is used for the spiritual practice of repeating the mantra given by the Satguru during initiation. The mantra itself is also called Simran. Simran repetition is done during meditation and also outside it.

== Sikhism ==
Simran—commonly used as a verb in Gurmukhi—refers to 'meditating' on the name (nām) of God. Sikhism is a distinct faith, whereby God can be realized purely through individual devotion, without subjection to rites and rituals by priests or other intermediaries.

According to the Guru Granth Sahib, through simran, one is purified and attains salvation (mukti). This is because si-mar means 'to die over', thus indicating the death of ego, allowing the realization of ultimate truth (sach) to appear.

On page 202 of the Guru Granth Sahib:

Simar simar sukh paa-i-aa

Translation:

Meditating, meditating in remembrance, I have found peace

This hymn teaches that a person who wishes to gain from this human life must attain a higher spiritual state by becoming free of attachment by realizing emptiness of worldly phenomena. Thereby, merit is acquired by devoutly repeating, comprehending, and living by the sacred word every day so as to progressively reveal the divine and ultimate truth to the person who earnestly seeks it:

Guru Ram Das says in Sarang ki var (Guru Granth Sahib, 1242):

Nām, the incorruptible is beyond our comprehending. At the same time, it is our constant companion and preserves all creation. Therefore, truth will disclose itself unto us and let us perceive it in our hearts. It is through earnestness that we can meet with such a truth.

=== Kabir ===
Simran is a theme common to the verses attributed to the fifteenth-century Indian poet and saint Kabir. In the compositions attributed to him in the ''Guru Granth Sahib'', remembrance of the divine name (Naam or Nāma) is described as an important expression of devotion (bhakti) and a technique for keeping God in sight. In his study of Kabir’s compositions in the ''Guru Granth Sahib'', scholar Jaroslav Strnad finds devotion to God and remembrance of the divine name as two of the principal themes. He also highlights Kabir’s focus on religious devotion within instead of performing religious rituals without actual remembrance of God.

In one of the verses attributed to Kabir in the ''Guru Granth Sahib'' (page 970), the practice is explicitly described as simran:

:''ਇਹੁ ਸਿਮਰਨੁ ਸਤਿਗੁਰ ਤੇ ਪਾਈਐ ॥''

:''ਸਦਾ ਸਦਾ ਸਿਮਰਿ ਦਿਨੁ ਰਾਤਿ ॥''

The verses tells us that this remembrance is received through the True Guru and that God should be remembered continually, day and night.

Kabir's compositions also criticise religious observances when they take precedence over remembrance of God. Strnad discusses a verse on page 970 of the ''Guru Granth Sahib'' in which Kabir questions a Brahmin who performs scriptural recitations but neglects the remembrance of Rama (Supreme God). This emphasis reflects the distinction in Kabir's poetry between outward religious practice and inward devotion to the divine.

== See also ==
- Vipassanā
- Dhyana
- Dhyana in Hinduism
- Sikhism
- Kabir
